= Dirty Harry (film series) =

American action film series

- Official film series logo
- Created by: Harry Julian Fink; R. M. Fink
- Original work: Dirty Harry (1971)
- Owners: Warner Bros. (Skydance)
- Years: 1971–1988

Print publications
- Novels: List of novels

Films and television
- Films: Dirty Harry (1971); Magnum Force (1973); The Enforcer (1976); Sudden Impact (1983); The Dead Pool (1988)

Games
- Video games: Dirty Harry; Dirty Harry (cancelled)

Miscellaneous
- Pinball: Dirty Harry

Dirty Harry
- Directed by: Don Siegel (1); Ted Post (2); James Fargo (3); Clint Eastwood (4); Buddy Van Horn (5)
- Written by: Harry Julian Fink (1); R. M. Fink (1); Dean Riesner (1, 3); John Milius (2); Michael Cimino (2); Stirling Silliphant (3); Joseph Stinson (4); Steve Sharon (5)
- Produced by: Don Siegel (1); Robert Daley (1–3); Clint Eastwood (4); David Valdes (5)
- Starring: Clint Eastwood
- Cinematography: Bruce Surtees (1, 4); Frank Stanley (2); Charles W. Short (3); Jack N. Green (5)
- Edited by: Carl Pingitore (1); Ferris Webster (2–3); Joel Cox (3–4); Ron Spang (5)
- Music by: Lalo Schifrin (1–2, 4–5); Jerry Fielding (3)
- Production company: Malpaso Productions
- Distributed by: Warner Bros.
- Running time: 530 minutes
- Country: United States
- Language: English
- Budget: $66 million (four films, except 2)
- Box office: $309.9 million (worldwide)

Dirty Harry is an American action thriller film series featuring San Francisco Police Department Homicide Division Inspector Harold "Dirty Harry" Callahan. The five films are: Dirty Harry (1971), Magnum Force (1973), The Enforcer (1976), Sudden Impact (1983), and The Dead Pool (1988). Clint Eastwood portrayed Callahan in all five films and directed Sudden Impact.

Callahan is notorious for his unorthodox, violent, and ruthless methods against the criminals and killers he is assigned to apprehend. At the same time, he is assigned a partner who is usually either killed or seriously injured during the film. Clint Eastwood was the only actor to have appeared in all five films.

== Films ==
Film	U.S. release date	Director(s)	Screenwriter(s)	Story by	Producer(s)
Dirty Harry	December 23, 1971	Don Siegel	Harry Julian Fink, R.M. Fink & Dean Riesner	Harry Julian Fink & R.M. Fink	Don Siegel
Magnum Force	December 25, 1973	Ted Post	John Milius & Michael Cimino	John Milius	Robert Daley
The Enforcer	December 22, 1976	James Fargo	Stirling Silliphant & Dean Riesner	Gail Morgan Hickman & S. W. Schurr	Robert Daley
Sudden Impact	December 9, 1983	Clint Eastwood	Joseph Stinson	Earl E. Smith & Charles B. Pierce	Clint Eastwood
The Dead Pool	July 13, 1988	Buddy Van Horn	Steve Sharon	Steve Sharon, Durk Pearson & Sandy Shaw	David Valdes

=== Dirty Harry (1971) ===
Dirty Harry (1971) was directed by Don Siegel, and starred Clint Eastwood as Harry Callahan. Harry tracks serial killer Scorpio (loosely based on the Zodiac killer). Eastwood's iconic portrayal of the blunt-speaking, unorthodox detective set the style for a number of his subsequent roles, and its box-office success led to the production of four sequels. The "alienated cop" motif was subsequently imitated by a number of other films. Early on in the movie, Callahan corners a bank robber and says, "You've got to ask yourself one question: 'Do I feel lucky?'. Well, do ya, punk?". The line became famous, although often misquoted as "Do you feel lucky, punk?"; the second movie, Magnum Force, opens with Harry asking, "Do you feel lucky?"

It was the fourth-highest-grossing film of 1971 after Fiddler on the Roof, The French Connection, and Diamonds Are Forever.

=== Magnum Force (1973) ===
Magnum Force (1973) was directed by Ted Post. The main theme of this film is vigilante justice, and the plot revolves around a group of renegade traffic cops who are executing criminals who have avoided conviction in court. Despite Harry's penchant for strong-arm methods, he does not tolerate coldblooded murder of the accused and resolves to stop the killers. In this film, Harry's catch-phrase is "A man's got to know his limitations."

=== The Enforcer (1976) ===
The Enforcer (1976) was directed by James Fargo. In this film, Harry is teamed with a female partner with no field experience (in 1976, American women had only recently been allowed to fill patrol and investigative assignments in most police bureaus), Inspector Kate Moore (Tyne Daly), as they take on a terrorist ring calling themselves the People's Revolutionary Strike Force. Harry opposes introducing inexperienced officers to the dangers of police work, whether male or female, and sees the homicide division as too dangerous for his new partner, who worked until recently in the personnel department. Though Moore starts out overenthusiastic, she soon proves herself valuable to Harry and matures quickly, earning his respect in the process.

=== Sudden Impact (1983) ===
Sudden Impact (1983) was directed by Clint Eastwood. Aging, but still bitter, Callahan is sent to a small town to follow up a lead in a murder case, which leads him directly to a rape victim who is out to avenge herself and her catatonic sister by killing the people who sexually assaulted them. The film is notable for Callahan's catchphrase, "Go ahead, make my day".

=== The Dead Pool (1988) ===
The Dead Pool (1988) was directed by Buddy Van Horn. Harry finds that he is among the subjects of a dead pool, a game betting on deaths of celebrities. Someone tries to rig the game by killing the celebrities on one player's list. Harry's catch phrase in this movie was "You're shit out of luck".

After this film, Eastwood retired from playing the Dirty Harry character, as he felt his age (58 in 1988) would make Harry a parody.

== Cast ==
Character	Films				
Character	Dirty Harry	Magnum Force	The Enforcer	Sudden Impact	The Dead Pool
Character	1971	1973	1976	1983	1988
Inspector Harold "Dirty Harry" Callahan	Clint Eastwood	Clint Eastwood	Clint Eastwood	Clint Eastwood	Clint Eastwood
Inspector Frank DiGiorgio	John Mitchum	John Mitchum	John Mitchum		
Chief of Police Paul Dacanelli	John Larch				
The Mayor	John Vernon		John Crawford		
Lt. Al Bressler	Harry Guardino		Harry Guardino		
Scorpio	Andy Robinson				
Inspector Chico Gonzalez	Reni Santoni				
Bank Robber	Albert Popwell				
Lt. Neil Briggs		Hal Holbrook			
Officer Charlie McCoy		Mitchell Ryan			
Officer John Davis		David Soul			
Officer Alan "Red" Astrachan		Kip Niven			
Officer Mike Grimes		Robert Urich			
Officer Phil Sweet		Tim Matheson			
Inspector Earlington "Early" Smith		Felton Perry			
J.J. Wilson		Albert Popwell			
Inspector Kate Moore			Tyne Daly		
Capt. Jerome McKay			Bradford Dillman		
Bobby Maxwell			DeVeren Bookwalter		
Lalo			Michael Cavanaugh		
Karl			Dick Durock		
Abdul			Kenneth Boyd		
Miki			Jocelyn Jones		
Father John			M. G. Kelly		
Big Ed Mustapha			Albert Popwell		
Jennifer Spencer				Sondra Locke	
Mick				Paul Drake	
Ray Perkins				Audrie J. Neenan	
Chief Lester Jannings				Pat Hingle	
Horace King				Albert Popwell	
Capt. Briggs				Bradford Dillman	
Lt. Donnelly				Michael Currie	Michael Currie
Samantha Walker					Patricia Clarkson
Peter Swan					Liam Neeson
Al Quan					Evan C. Kim
Harlan Rook					David Hunt
Johnny Squares					Jim Carrey

== Reception ==
Year	Film	Rotten Tomatoes	Metacritic	Box office	Inflation adjusted (as of 2019)
1971	Dirty Harry	89% (53 reviews)	87 (10 reviews)	$35,976,000	$196,886,800
1973	Magnum Force	70% (27 reviews)	58 (7 reviews)	$39,768,000	$202,884,200
1976	The Enforcer	69% (35 reviews)	58 (7 reviews)	$46,236,000	$196,014,600
1983	Sudden Impact	53% (40 reviews)	52 (13 reviews)	$67,642,693	$187,900,400
1988	The Dead Pool	53% (34 reviews)	46 (15 reviews)	$37,903,295	$83,276,600

== Influence on other productions ==
=== Sin City: That Yellow Bastard ===
Frank Miller, creator of the Sin City graphic novels, revealed in an interview that he created the Sin City story-arc That Yellow Bastard out of his dislike of The Dead Pool. Miller said: "When I went to see the last Dirty Harry movie, The Dead Pool, I was disgusted. I went out and said, this is not a Dirty Harry movie, this is nothing, this is a pale sequel." and I also said, "that's not the last Dirty Harry story, I will show you the last Dirty Harry story." A character in the That Yellow Bastard story is Nancy Callahan, named after Harry Callahan.

Bruce Willis played Hartigan, the "Dirty Harry of the story", in the Sin City (2005) film.

=== The Protector ===
This 1985 film featuring Jackie Chan was Chan's second American feature film. The movie was noted for being similar to the Dirty Harry series, with inspiration taken from there by director James Glickenhaus.

=== The Rookie ===
Directed by and co-starring Clint Eastwood, the film features an aging, tough cop who partners with a rookie cop, played by Charlie Sheen. Upon the film's release, critics and audiences noted the similarities between Eastwood's two characters.

=== Gran Torino ===
Eastwood returned to acting after a four-year, self-imposed hiatus in this 2008 film, which he also directed and produced, and partly scored with his son Kyle and Jamie Cullum, Eastwood plays Walt Kowalski, a recently widowed Korean War veteran alienated from his family and angry at the world. Walt's young neighbor, Thao Vang Lor, is pressured into stealing Walt's prized 1972 Ford Gran Torino by his cousin for his initiation into a gang. Walt thwarts the theft and subsequently develops a relationship with the boy and his family.

Biographer Marc Eliot called Eastwood's role "an amalgam of the Man with No Name, Dirty Harry, and William Munny, here, aged and cynical, but willing and able to fight on whenever the need arose". Manohla Dargis compared Eastwood's presence on film to Dirty Harry and the Man with No Name, stating: "Dirty Harry is back, in a way, in Gran Torino, not as a character but as a ghostly presence. He hovers in the film, in its themes and high-caliber imagery, and of course, most obviously in Mr. Eastwood's face. It is a monumental face now, so puckered and pleated that it no longer looks merely weathered, as it has for decades, but seems closer to petrified wood."

Tania Modleski, author of Clint Eastwood and Male Weepies, said, "[f]or many reviewers, Gran Torino represents the final step in Eastwood's repudiation of the Dirty Harry persona. If Unforgiven ends up being equivocal in its attitude toward violence and vigilantism, Gran Torino appears to accept the impotence of the lone, avenging hero" and that the impotence "is perhaps underlined by Walt's repeated gesture of pointing his finger at villains as if it were a gun." Amy Biancolli of the Houston Chronicle said that though Walt, an "old fart", does not have the same name as Dirty Harry, "there's no mistaking the rasp in his voice or the uncompromising crankiness of his Weltanschauung." Tom Charity of CNN said of Walt: "Like other Eastwood heroes before him, Walt sacrifices his independence by accepting that others depend on him." John Serba of The Grand Rapids Press said that Walt, who is "bitter, hopelessly cranky," "shares a sense of moral certainty" with Callahan, but that Walt "is infused with the wisdom and weariness" that Callahan does not have.

== Home media ==
Warner Home Video owns rights to the Dirty Harry series. The five films have been remastered for DVD three times — in 1998, 2001, and 2008. They have been packaged in several DVD box sets. The Dirty Harry films made their high-definition debuts with the 2008 Blu-ray discs. Warner's marketing plan called for only The Dead Pool to be available as a separate Blu-ray, requiring fans who want the other four movies in high definition to buy the box set. In 2010, all five movies were released as a Blu-ray box set, Clint Eastwood Dirty Harry Collection.

== Other media ==
=== Novels ===
In the early 1980s, Warner Books published 12 books, authored under the pseudonym Dane Hartman, that further the adventures of Dirty Harry. The novels were later translated into French in the 1990s, as the Collection Supercops.

=== Video games ===
In 1995, Williams Electronic Games created a Dirty Harry pinball machine, inspired by the 1971 film. 4,248 units were manufactured. Notable features include a gun-handle shooter, a moving cannon used to shoot playfield targets, and custom audio callouts recorded by Clint Eastwood. Game modes, sounds, and dot-matrix animations reflect events in the film, such as a car chase, barroom brawl, defusing bombs, and "Feel Lucky" mode.

Dirty Harry is a 1990 video game based on Dirty Harry film series. It incorporates several references to the film series.

Dirty Harry, originally scheduled for a 2007 release, is a canceled video game by The Collective based on the 1971 film of the same name.
