= Dirty Harry (disambiguation) =

Dirty Harry is a 1971 film starring Clint Eastwood.

Dirty Harry may also refer to:

== Dirty Harry franchise ==
- Dirty Harry (character), Inspector Harold Francis Callahan, title character of the film and its sequels
- Dirty Harry (film series), a film franchise begun with the 1971 film
- Dirty Harry (1990 video game), an NES video game based on the franchise
- Dirty Harry (canceled video game), a canceled video game scheduled for a 2007 release by The Collective, Inc., based on the 1971 film of the same name
- Dirty Harry (pinball), a 1995 pinball game based on the franchise
- Dirty Harry novels, a series of tie-in novels attributed to the pen name Dane Hartman

== People ==
- Dirty Harry (musician) (born 1982), British singer, stage name of Victoria Harrison
- Alfredo Lim, nicknamed "Dirty Harry" (born 1929), Filipino politician
- Derty Harry, (1973-2006) pseudonym of DeShaun Dupree Holton, better known as Proof, American rapper from the rap group D12

== Other uses ==
- Dirty Harry's Peak, mountain
- "Dirty Harry" (song), a 2005 song by Gorillaz
- Upshot-Knothole Harry, or Dirty Harry, a 1953 nuclear weapons test during Operation Upshot-Knothole
- Dirty Harry (Dexter), a season 4 episode of Dexter
- Dirty Harry, character from the musical Never Forget
- Dirty Harry round, a variant of the 5.56 standard NATO ammunition

== See also ==
- Dirty Hari, 2020 Indian Telugu-language film by M. S. Raju
