= Dirty Harry novels =

Series of tie-in and original novels

Dirty Harry novels include film novelizations and original tie-ins based on the Dirty Harry film franchise. Like the films, the novels portray Inspector "Dirty Harry" Callahan as he ruthlessly fights criminals.

Novelizations of the first four films, Dirty Harry, Magnum Force, The Enforcer, and Sudden Impact, were published between 1971 and 1983. Additionally, after star Clint Eastwood announced he would make no further Dirty Harry films after The Enforcer, Warner Books published twelve new novels attributed to Dane Hartman, a collective pen name used by at least three authors, between 1981 and 1983.

== Novelizations ==
Warner Bros. licensed novelizations of the four first Dirty Harry films as tie-ins. Author and screenwriter Phillip Rock wrote the novelization of Dirty Harry in 1971, based on an early draft of the script. Mel Valley wrote the sequel, Magnum Force, in 1973. Wesley Morgan novelized The Enforcer in 1976. The Sudden Impact novelization was written by Joseph Stinson, one of the screenwriters. Stinson, who had rewritten the originally independent script as a Dirty Harry vehicle for Eastwood, adapted the novel in 1983.

== Original novels ==
Following The Enforcer, Eastwood announced that he would not make any further Dirty Harry films (he eventually returned to the role in Sudden Impact in 1983 and The Dead Pool in 1988). To continue making money from the franchise, Warner Bros. decided to publish new novels under Warner Books' "Men of Action" series, starting in 1981. The books were attributed to Dane Hartman, a pen name created for the series and used collectively by several different writers employed by Warner. Authors writing as Hartman included martial arts authority Ric Meyers and Leslie Alan Horvitz, who primarily specialized in science fiction and nonfiction.

Warner published twelve novels on a roughly bimonthly basis: Duel for Cannons, Death on the Docks, The Long Death, The Mexico Kill, Family Skeletons, City of Blood, Massacre at Russian River, Hatchet Men, The Killing Connection, The Blood of Strangers, Death in the Air, The Dealer of Death. The series ended in 1983, the same year Sudden Impact was released.

During the 1990s, Jean-Paul Schweighaeuser translated the Dirty Harry novels into French, for publication by Éditions Fleuve Noir as the Collection Supercops.

== Bibliography ==
Duel for Cannons cover.

=== Dirty Harry novels by Dane Hartman ===
1. Duel For Cannons (August 1981)
2. Death on the Docks (August 1981)
3. The Long Death (November 1981)
4. The Mexico Kill (September 1982)
5. Family Skeletons (April 1982)
6. City of Blood (June 1982)
7. Massacre at Russian River (June 1982)
8. Hatchet Men (September 1982)
9. The Killing Connection (September 1982)
10. The Blood of Strangers (1982)
11. Death in the Air (January 1983)
12. The Dealer of Death (March 1983)

=== Collection Supercops translations by Jean-Paul Schweighaeuser ===
1. Duel a mort (1994)
2. Meurtres sur les quais (1994)
3. Mort lente (1994)
4. Massacre au Mexique (1994)
5. La mort est au rendez-vous (1994)
6. Panique sur la ville (1994)
7. Marijuana (1995)
8. Du sang sur Chinatown (1995)
9. Tueur de femmes (1995)
