= Ric Meyers =

American author (born 1953)

Richard "Ric" Meyers
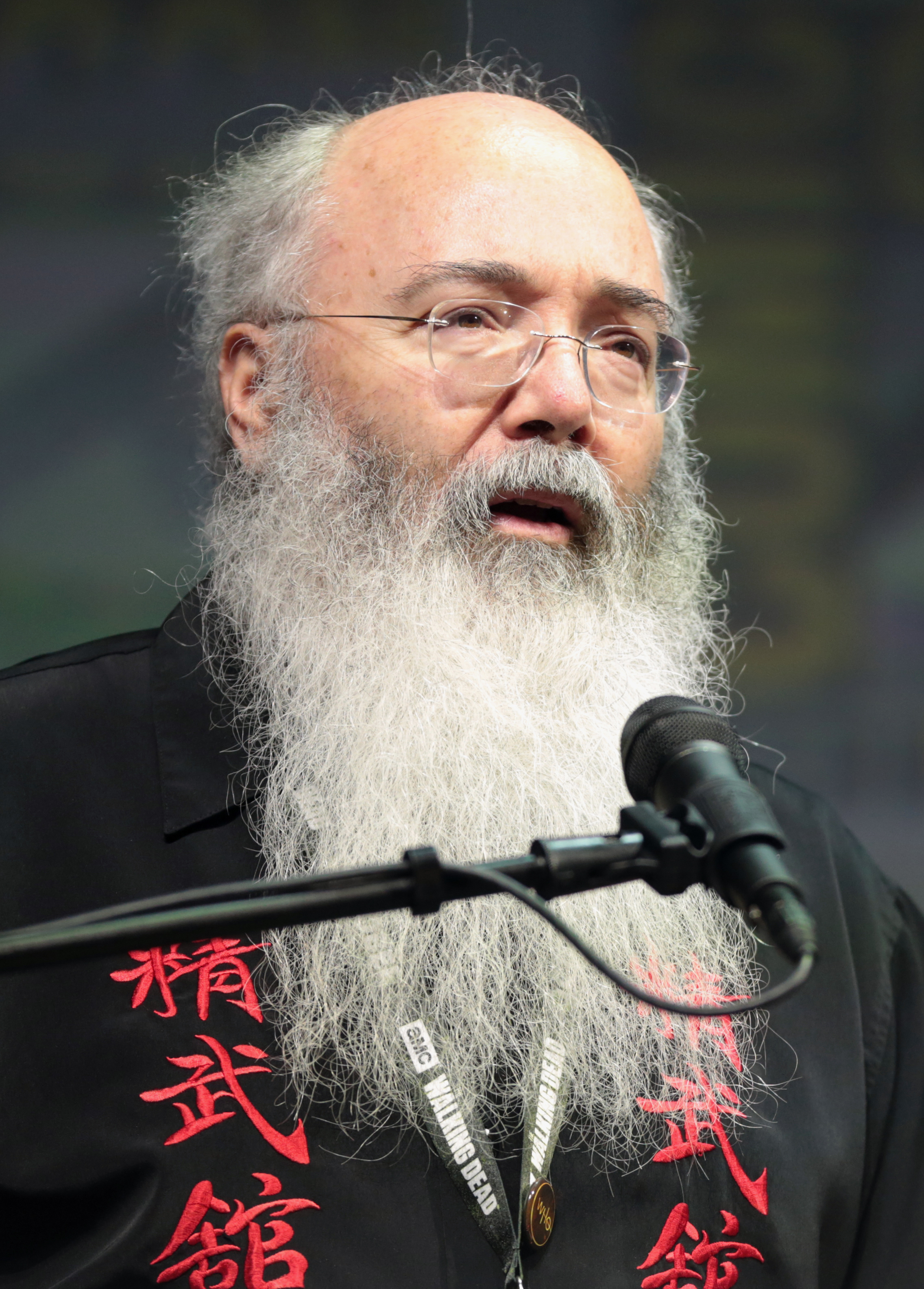
- Meyers at the 2018 San Diego Comic-Con
- Born: August 3, 1953 (age 73)
- Occupations: Writer, editor, consultant, actor, teacher
- Spouse(s): Melissa Nichols, 1980 - 1984
- Writing career
- Genres: Mystery, science-fiction, fantasy, action-adventure, horror, TV, film, children's, comic books
- Notable works: Martial Arts Movies: From Bruce Lee to the Ninjas, TV Detectives, Murder in Halruua, Year of the Ninja Master, The Incredible Hulk: Cry of the Beast, Dirty Harry: Duel for Cannons, Films of Fury: The Kung Fu Movie Movie, the San Diego Comic-Con Superhero Kung Fu Extravaganza.
- Website: ricmeyers.com

Richard Meyers (born 1953), is an American author, ghostwriter, screenwriter, consultant, actor, editor, and teacher, best known for his contributions to the martial arts film industry. Rim Films called him "one of the men most responsible for the acceptance of Asian action movies and stars in America".

Meyers has been writing, editing, and performing professionally since 1974. He is the author of more than seventy novels and non-fiction books under variations of his own name, as well as several pseudonyms, such as Dane Hartman and Wade Barker. His works include Doomstar, Fear Itself, Murder in Halruua, TV Detectives, For One Week Only: The World of Exploitation Films, and Martial Arts Movies: From Bruce Lee to the Ninjas. In addition, he has made contributions to such diverse paperback book series as The Destroyer, Dirty Harry, Ninja Master, and The Incredible Hulk.

He wrote a history of kung fu films, Films of Fury: The Kung Fu Movie Book, and scripted the documentary based on the book, Films of Fury: The Kung Fu Movie Movie (2010).

He is the film columnist for Inside Kung Fu and Asian Cult Cinema magazine, and long-term presenter of the San Diego Comic Con Kung Fu Extravaganza.

Meyers has also entertained in film, television, arenas, major pop culture conventions, DVDs, radio, podcasts, and children's hospitals. He teaches writing, film, and kung-fu.

== Early life ==
Meyers was born in Connecticut. He is the son of Stanley Meyers, who was the Northeast Regional Advisor for the National Association of Retarded Citizens as well as Pennsylvania's first state secretary for what is now known as Intellectual and Developmental Disability Services. Ric was raised by actress Vera Johnson, best known for playing the older version of Rosie O’Donnell's character in the 1992 film, A League of Their Own.

== Early career ==
Meyers studied theater and cinema studies at Emerson College, Boston University, and the University of Bridgeport. In 1974 he was hired as assistant editor at Seaboard Periodicals and Atlas Comics. After the company folded in 1975, Meyers did not return to college, instead pursuing a writing career.

With the help of his Seaboard Peridicals/Atlas Comics superior, Jeff Rovin, Meyers authored non-fiction books including TV Super Stars, The Illustrated Soap Opera Companion, Movies on Movies, The Great Science Fiction Films, and The World of Fantasy Films. He moved on to writing about film and television, creating award-winning works on TV detectives and exploitation films. He was hired as the first ghostwriter for the best-selling paperback series The Destroyer. He went on to write more than two dozen paperbacks in the police, martial arts, and war action genres. He also wrote under variations of his own name, including two science fiction novels, three horror novels, and a fantasy mystery for the Forgotten Realms series of Dungeons and Dragons.

He continued to work as an editor on publications including Starlog, Famous Monsters of Filmland, The Armchair Detective, and Millimeter magazine. He was head writer for the first issue of Fangoria, as well as the official tie-in magazines for the movies Moonraker and Alien.

== Enter the Film Dragon ==
Ex-Atlas Comics artist/writer Larry Hama introduced Meyers to samurai and kung-fu cinema in 1978. Meyers secured his first contract to write a book on the subject, and travelled to Hong Kong to meet Jackie Chan. This led to his inspiring Jonathan Ross to make a documentary on the kung fu star as part of his Son of the Incredibly Strange Film Show series.

Meyers became a contributing editor for Inside Kung Fu magazine, continuing in that role until it ceased publication in 2011. An updated edition of his book Martial Arts Movies From Bruce Lee to Jackie Chan & More was released in 2001. He appeared on Bruce Lee and Jackie Chan specials for A&E's Biography and Bravo Profiles, and contributed audio commentaries, liner notes, and cover copy for hundreds of DVDs in Asia and America.

Meyers hosted his first San Diego Comic-Con Superhero Kung Fu Extravaganza in 1997. He prepared its 20th Anniversary Celebration in 2017. He presented kung fu seminars to the staff of the first Kung Fu Panda film, as well as its subsequent Nickelodeon TV series.

== Stage Appearances ==
Meyers played the king at the Medieval Times Dinner and Tournament in Lyndhurst, New Jersey, for almost two years. He appeared as a jolly old elf in malls, stores, churches, homes, and, via video, in children's hospitals.

== Awards and honors ==
Meyers has been inducted into The World Martial Arts Hall of Fame, the World Wide Martial Arts Hall of Fame, the Budo Magazine Hall of Fame, and the Action Martial Arts Magazine Hall of Fame. He received an Edgar Allan Poe Special Award from the Mystery Writers of America.
