= The Dead Pool =

1988 film by Buddy Van Horn

- Theatrical release poster by Bill Gold
- Directed by: Buddy Van Horn
- Screenplay by: Steve Sharon
- Story by: Steve Sharon; Durk Pearson; Sandy Shaw
- Based on: Characters by: Harry Julian Fink; R.M. Fink
- Produced by: David Valdes
- Starring: Clint Eastwood; Patricia Clarkson; Liam Neeson; Evan Kim
- Cinematography: Jack N. Green
- Edited by: Ron Spang; Joel Cox
- Music by: Lalo Schifrin
- Production company: Malpaso Productions
- Distributed by: Warner Bros.
- Release date: July 13, 1988
- Running time: 91 minutes
- Country: United States
- Language: English
- Budget: $30 million
- Box office: $39 million (US Collection)

The Dead Pool is a 1988 American action-thriller film directed by Buddy Van Horn, written by Steve Sharon, and starring Clint Eastwood as Inspector "Dirty" Harry Callahan. It is the fifth and final film in the Dirty Harry film series.

The story concerns the manipulation of a dead pool game by a serial killer, whose efforts are confronted by the hardened San Francisco detective Callahan (Eastwood). The film co-stars Liam Neeson, Evan Kim, Patricia Clarkson and Michael Currie (reprising his role from Sudden Impact), and also features an early brief appearance by Jim Carrey.

It is also the only film in the series not to feature Albert Popwell, an actor who had played a different character in each of the previous four films, as well as the only one to be recorded in Dolby Stereo. Composer and series regular Lalo Schifrin returned to score the film’s soundtrack.

== Plot ==
Inspector Harry Callahan's testimony incarcerates criminal kingpin Lou Janero. Now famous, Callahan becomes the target of Janero's men as well as the news media, both of which he dislikes. After Callahan kills four hitmen during an ambush, the SFPD assigns Al Quan as his partner; Callahan advises him to get a bulletproof vest, as his partners often get killed. The pair investigate the fatal heroin overdose of rock singer Johnny Squares, found in his trailer during filming of a music video directed by Peter Swan at the Port of San Francisco. Callahan discovers that Squares' death was not a typical overdose, but actually murder.

Dean Madison, Swan's producer, is killed during a robbery in Chinatown. Callahan kills three of the robbers, and Quan captures the fourth. They discover a list in Madison's pocket with Callahan and Squares' names. It is revealed that Madison and Swan are participants in a "dead pool" game, in which participants predict celebrity deaths in the San Francisco Bay Area: whether by accident, violence, or natural causes. Movie critic Molly Fisher, also on Swan's list, is later killed in her condominium by an intruder claiming to be Swan, causing panic among the surviving celebrities and making Swan a prime suspect.

After Callahan destroys a television station's camera, he must cooperate with reporter Samantha Walker to avoid a lawsuit; if he agrees to a profile of his controversial career, the suit will be dropped. Callahan sees this as a ploy to exploit the danger he is in for its ratings value. After they survive an attack by Janero's assassins all of which are killed by Callahan, the incident and her own unwillingness to be the subject of news coverage cause Walker to reconsider the dangers police officers face in juxtaposition with the public's right to realize.

Meanwhile, at San Quentin State Prison, Callahan uses convicted killer Butcher Hicks to threaten Janero if any harm happens to him. Janero ends the attacks and assigns two men to Callahan as his personal bodyguards, although Callahan initially thinks they are after him.

An attention-seeker named Gus Wheeler, falsely claiming responsibility for the murders, douses himself in gasoline and threatens to light himself on fire in front of a large crowd. Walker foils his ploy by refusing to film him; Wheeler accidentally sets himself on fire, but Callahan saves him. Impressed by Walker's refusal to exploit Wheeler, Callahan becomes close with her. Meanwhile, Swan tells Callahan and Quan about Harlan Rook, a deranged fan suffering from "process schizophrenia" who thinks the director stole his ideas and work; Swan has a restraining order against him.

Rook then kills local television personality Nolan Kennard, another person on the "dead pool" list, using a radio-controlled car filled with C4 explosive under the victim's vehicle. Callahan finds a toy car wheel at the crime scene, and later sees another toy car following him and Quan. Recognizing the threat, they flee through the city pursued by the toy car, controlled by Rook while driving his own car at the same time. Trapped in an alleyway, Rook sets the car in armed mode. Callahan is able to back the car up enough so the engine takes most of the blast. Both survive, but Quan has broken ribs; Harry later finds out Quan was wearing a bulletproof vest, on the recommendation of his father to take Harry's advice.

Rook, claiming to be Swan, calls Walker at the television station and invites her to Swan's film studio for an interview. Rook kills the cameraman and kidnaps Samantha. While at Rook's apartment, the police discover torn posters of Swan's films, large quantities of explosives, and Walker's name replacing Callahan's on the "dead pool" list. At the studio, Callahan confronts Rook holding Walker hostage and surrenders his .44 Magnum revolver after Rook threatens to slit her throat. Callahan lures Rook to a pier after a chase during which Rook shoots at him with his own gun. Rook runs out of bullets, and Callahan shoots him with a Svend Foyn harpoon cannon, impaling him through his chest and killing him. Callahan retrieves his gun and leaves with Walker just as the police and news media arrive.

== Cast ==
- Clint Eastwood as Inspector Harry Callahan
- Patricia Clarkson as Samantha Walker
- Liam Neeson as Peter Swan
- Evan C. Kim as Inspector Al Quan
- David Hunt as Harlan Rook
- Michael Currie as Captain Donnelly
- Michael Goodwin as Lieutenant Ackerman
- Jim Carrey as Johnny Squares
- Anthony Charnota as Lou Janero
- Ronnie Claire Edwards as Molly Fisher
- Louis Giambalvo as Gus Wheeler
- Diego Chairs as "Butcher" Hicks
- Charles Martinet as Police Station Reporter
- Patrick Van Horn as Freeway Reporter
- Shawn Elliott as Chester Docksteder
- Bill Wattenburg as Nolan Kennard
- Harry Demopoulos as Doctor in Hospital
- Marc Alaimo as Bodyguard
- Justin Whalin as Jason
- Darwin Gillett as Patrick

Members of the hard rock band Guns N' Roses make uncredited cameo appearances at the funeral of Johnny Squares. They also appear during filming of a "nightmare scene" at the docks, where guitarist Slash fires a harpoon gun through a window and is berated by Swan.

== Production ==
Eastwood reacted to starring in another Dirty Harry film, "It's fun, once in a while, to have a character you can go back to. It's like revisiting an old friend you haven't seen for a long time. You figure 'I'll go back and see how he feels about things now." The Dead Pool was filmed in February and March 1988 in San Francisco.

=== Car chase ===
Callahan is pursued through San Francisco's hilly streets in his unmarked Oldsmobile 98 squad car by a miniature R/C car (assembled and controlled by Rook) containing an R/C bomb for Rook to detonate. The R/C car used for the film was a highly modified Team Associated RC10 electric race buggy powered by a Reedy motor that had to be geared up high to an 8.4v NiCd battery, topped with an off-the-shelf 1963 Chevrolet Corvette R/C car body by Parma International. The RC10 had its suspension lowered from the original to a lower ground clearance for better high-speed stability. Needing the best R/C car driver to control the RC10 action, Van Horn hired the 1985 IFMAR 1:10 Electric Off-Road World Champion Jay Halsey. At first, Van Horn was unsure if the RC10 could keep up with the Oldsmobile, so for the scene where both vehicles start from the top of the hill, the director allowed both cars to start off together. As a result, the RC10 outran the Oldsmobile, so the scene had to be re-filmed with the Oldsmobile reaching the bottom first. At one point in a scene where the cars interact, the RC10 jumps over the Oldsmobile, lands, and then proceeds to the end of the street to wait for the Oldsmobile. One scene, in which Halsey was only required to drive the RC10 at full speed to where the bomb was to be detonated, required over a week to film. A motorized tricycle with a camera mounted at ground level was used for close-up filming of the RC10 in action. Engine sound effects for the electric-motor RC10 were added in post-production.

The chase scenes have many similarities with the famous car-chase in the Steve McQueen film Bullitt, which Eastwood has said was his favorite part of the McQueen film. The necessity of closing down various continuously busy city streets meant that the sequences tend to jump from district to district, much as the similar scenes did in the McQueen film, making for a number of continuity errors that are easily overlooked during the fast-paced scenes, just as the motorcycle chase-scenes in the second Dirty Harry film (Magnum Force) jumped around but are seldom mentioned.

== Reception ==
The Dead Pool holds a 53% approval rating on the review aggregation website Rotten Tomatoes based on 34 reviews with a mean of 5.3 of a possible 10. Its critics' consensus reads: "While it offers its fair share of violent thrills and tough wit, The Dead Pool ends the Dirty Harry series on an uninspired note." On Metacritic, the film has a score of 46 out of 100 based on 15 reviews, indicating "mixed or average reviews".

Roger Ebert of the Chicago Sun-Times gave the film three-and-a-half stars out of four and wrote that it was "as good as the original Dirty Harry," praising it as "smart, quick, and made with real wit". Gene Siskel of the Chicago Tribune also awarded three-and-a-half stars out of four and called it "the second best of the series, beaten only by the 1971 original", explaining that "where the previous sequels have been mostly dour gun blasts, The Dead Pool is a thriller with wit and humor and tension." Vincent Canby of The New York Times wrote that the film "possesses a couple of good jokes, but nothing can disguise the fact that it's a mini-movie in the company of a mythic figure". Variety wrote, "From the original on, Harry has always been a fantasy character but his stories have been involving. Here, he remains absurdly separated from reality in an exceedingly lame yarn that lurches from one shootout to the next." Michael Wilmington of the Los Angeles Times wrote, "Along with the 1976 The Enforcer, The Dead Pool is among the weakest of the entire 'Dirty Harry' series. With its stylized story-line and almost style-less direction, it sometimes resembles a juggling act with sledgehammers." Desson Howe of The Washington Post wrote, "Unless you're a Clint fan (and — own up — who isn't?) there's little other reason to sit through this one. Eastwood, who's had far bigger concerns recently, such as directing a movie about jazz great Charlie Parker, seems content to mark time. And pick up another cheque."

=== Box office ===
The Dead Pool was released in United States theatres July 1988. In its opening weekend, the film took $9,071,330 in 1988 cinemas in the US, at an average of $4,563. In total in the US, the film made $39,903,294, making it the least profitable of the five films in the Dirty Harry series.

=== End of film series ===
Eastwood has publicly announced that he has no interest in acting in another Dirty Harry film. In 2000, he jokingly spoke about potential sequels: "Dirty Harry VI! Harry is retired. He's standing in a stream, fly-fishing. He gets tired of using the pole— and BA-BOOM! Or Harry is retired, and he catches bad guys with his walker?"

== See also ==
- Dirty Harry (1971)
- Magnum Force (1973)
- The Enforcer (1976)
- Sudden Impact (1983)

== Bibliography ==
- Eliot, Marc (2009). American Rebel: The Life of Clint Eastwood. Harmony Books. ISBN 978-0-307-33688-0.
- Hughes, Howard (2009). Aim for the Heart. London: I.B. Tauris. ISBN 978-1-84511-902-7.
- Munn, Michael (1992). Clint Eastwood: Hollywood's Loner. London: Robson Books. ISBN 0-86051-790-X.
- Street, Joe (2016). Dirty Harry's America: Clint Eastwood, Harry Callahan, and the Conservative Backlash. University Press of Florida. ISBN 978-0-8130-6167-2.
