= The Enforcer (1976 film) =

1976 film by James Fargo

- Theatrical release poster by Bill Gold
- Directed by: James Fargo
- Screenplay by: Stirling Silliphant; Dean Riesner
- Story by: Gail Morgan Hickman; S. W. Schurr
- Based on: Characters by: Harry Julian Fink; R. M. Fink
- Produced by: Robert Daley
- Starring: Clint Eastwood; Harry Guardino; Bradford Dillman; Tyne Daly
- Cinematography: Charles W. Short
- Edited by: Joel Cox; Ferris Webster
- Music by: Jerry Fielding
- Production company: The Malpaso Company
- Distributed by: Warner Bros.
- Release date: December 22, 1976
- Running time: 96 minutes
- Country: United States
- Language: English
- Budget: $9 million
- Box office: $46.2 million

The Enforcer is a 1976 American neo-noir action-thriller film and the third in the Dirty Harry film series. Directed by James Fargo in his feature directorial debut, it stars Clint Eastwood who reprises his lead role as Inspector "Dirty" Harry Callahan. The film co-stars Tyne Daly, DeVeren Bookwalter and Bradford Dillman, with John Mitchum and Harry Guardino each reprising their roles from previous entries for their final appearances in the series.

The film follows the further adventures of Inspector Callahan (Eastwood) as he and his new partner, rookie Inspector Kate Moore (Daly) team up to foil a terrorist organization made up of disgruntled Vietnam War veterans led by Bobby Maxwell (Bookwalter). It was written by Stirling Silliphant and Dean Riesner, from a story by Gail Morgan Hickman and S. W. Schurr and is the only Dirty Harry film not scored by Lalo Schifrin; instead, the film’s soundtrack was composed by Jerry Fielding.

== Plot ==
In Marin County, two gas-company workers are lured by a scantily clad woman named Miki to a remote spot in Mill Valley and killed by Bobby Maxwell. A group calling itself the People's Revolutionary Strike Force (PRSF), led by Maxwell, poses as a terrorist organization to conceal their true purpose.

San Francisco Police Department Inspector Harry Callahan and his partner Frank DiGiorgio deal with a con artist at a restaurant and then respond to a holdup at a liquor store. The robbers take hostages and demand a police car to escape in. Callahan drives his car into the store and guns the robbers down in the resulting chaos. Callahan's superior, Captain Jerome McKay, reprimands him for using "excessive force" and transfers him to the personnel department to work on promotion boards. Callahan learns the mayor's new affirmative-action rules require promotions go to several women, including Kate Moore, a senior desk officer with no field experience.

Maxwell leads the PRSF to a warehouse and after fatally stabbing a security guard, steals M72 LAW rockets, M16 rifles, a taser, and other weapons from the warehouse. DiGiorgio and another officer catch them in the act and DiGiorgio holds them up at gunpoint, but is stabbed by Maxwell, accidentally shooting Miki in a reflex action. Maxwell then kills Miki because her injuries made her a deadweight, then runs over DiGiorgio's partner while escaping. Following DiGiorgio's death, Callahan is transferred back to homicide but is dismayed to find that Moore is his new partner. At a United States Army demonstration, Callahan pulls Moore out of the dangerous backblast area of a LAW rocket and tells her that he doubts her ability to perform in dangerous situations.

When Callahan and Moore leave an autopsy at the Hall of Justice, a bomb explodes in the restroom. They capture the bomber in a church after a foot chase and meet "Big" Ed Mustapha, the leader of a black militant group called Uhuru, which the bomber formerly belonged to recently. Callahan makes a deal with Mustapha for information, but McKay arrests the group for the PRSF's crimes. With his credibility damaged, Callahan refuses to participate in a televised press conference that the publicity-seeking mayor intends to use to commend the partners for Mustapha's arrest. McKay suspends Callahan and takes his badge but Moore pledges to continue to help him and they share drinks in a sign of mutual respect.

The PRSF ambushes the mayor's motorcade outside a Giants game at Candlestick Park, killing his bodyguard and aide and taking him hostage. Callahan bails out Mustapha, who leads him to a priest who mentors Maxwell. At the church where Callahan tackled the bomber, Wanda, one of Maxwell's teammates dressed as a nun, attempts to shoot Callahan as he forcefully interrogates the priest, but she is killed by Moore. The priest reveals that the PRSF members are hiding on Alcatraz Island. The duo arrive on the island and split up to free the mayor. After killing the remaining members of the PRSF, Moore warns an exposed Callahan of Maxwell, who then shoots her instead. Callahan avenges Moore by cornering Maxwell in an old guard tower and blowing it up with a LAW rocket, obliterating Maxwell. Ignoring the mayor's profuse gratitude, Callahan abandons him and walks over to his partner's corpse as McKay arrives in a helicopter and announces to the now dead Maxwell and his men that the SFPD will give in to all of his demands.

== Cast ==
- Clint Eastwood as Inspector Harry Callahan
- Tyne Daly as Inspector Kate Moore
- Harry Guardino as Lieutenant Al Bressler
- Bradford Dillman as Captain Jerome McKay
- John Mitchum as Inspector Frank DiGiorgio
- Bill Ackridge as Andy
- DeVeren Bookwalter as Bobby Maxwell
- Albert Popwell as Ed "Big Ed" Mustapha
- John Crawford as The Mayor of San Francisco
- Robert Hoy as Buchinski
- Michael Cavanaugh as Lalo
- Jocelyn Jones as Miki Waleska
- Dick Durock as Karl
- Samantha Doane as Wanda
- M. G. Kelly as Father John
- Terry McGovern as Disc Jockey
- John Roselius as Mayor's Driver
- Rudy Ramos as Mendez, Store Robber
- Nick Pellegrino as Martin
- Bill Jelliffe as Johnny
- Joe Bellan as Freddie the Fainter
- Tim O'Neill as Police Sergeant
- Jan Stratton as Mrs Grey
- Will McMillan as Lieutenant Dobbs
- Jerry Walter as Krause
- Steve Eoff as Bustanoby
- Tim Burrus as Henry Lee
- Ronald Manning as "Tex"
- Adele Proom as Irene DiGeorgio
- Glenn Leigh Marshall as Army Sergeant
- Robert Behling as Autopsy Surgeon
- Stan Richie as Bridge Operator
- Brian Fong as Scoutmaster
- Art Rimdzius as Porno Director
- Arthur Malet as Bystander (uncredited)
- Chuck Hicks as Huey
- Ann Macy as Madam
- Gloria Prince as Massage Girl
- Kenneth Boyd as Abdul
- Bernard Glin as Koblo
- Fritz Manes as Detective #1

== Production ==
=== Script ===
The first script was written in 1974 by two young San Francisco-area film students, Gail Morgan Hickman and S.W. Schurr, with the title Moving Target. After seeing Dirty Harry and Magnum Force, the two fledgling writers decided to pen a screenplay of their own featuring the character of Inspector Harry Callahan. Inspired by the Patty Hearst kidnapping in 1974, the storyline had Inspector Harry Callahan going up against a violent militant group reminiscent of the Symbionese Liberation Army. In the script, the militants kidnap and ransom the mayor of San Francisco.

After the screenplay was finished, Hickman visited Eastwood's Carmel restaurant, the Hog's Breath Inn, and approached Eastwood's business partner, Paul Lippman, asking if he would give their effort to Eastwood. Lippman was initially hesitant, but finally agreed. Although Eastwood thought the script needed work, he liked the concept, particularly the priest with militant leanings and the portrayal of black militants, which was based on the Black Panther Party.

Warner Bros., meanwhile, eager to capitalize on the success of the two Dirty Harry films, had hired seasoned screenwriter Stirling Silliphant to write a new Harry Callahan story. Silliphant wrote a script called Dirty Harry and More, in which the Callahan character was teamed up with a female, Asian-American partner named More. Eastwood liked the female partner angle, but felt the script spent too much time on character and did not have enough action. Eastwood then showed the Hickman/Schurr script to Silliphant, and Silliphant agreed to rewrite it.

Silliphant wrote the script throughout late 1975 and early 1976, and delivered his draft to Eastwood in February 1976. While Eastwood approved, he believed the emphasis was still too much on the character relationships rather than the action, and was concerned the fans might not approve. He then brought in screenwriter Dean Riesner, who had worked on the scripts of Dirty Harry and Coogan's Bluff, to do revisions.

=== Casting ===
Recurring characters Lieutenant Bressler (Harry Guardino) and Frank DiGiorgio (Mitchum) reprise their roles for the last time in a Dirty Harry film. Bressler was Callahan's boss in the first film of the series; DiGiorgio appeared in the previous two, but dies in this film. A new character, Captain Jerome McKay (Dillman), was introduced as Callahan's superior officer. Dillman played a similar role, Captain Briggs, in Sudden Impact.

Albert Popwell also returns as a character in this film, having played the Bank Robber in the first film of the series and Sidney the pimp in Magnum Force.

The character of Kate Moore, Harry's female partner, went to Tyne Daly. Daly's casting was initially uncertain, given that she turned down the role three times. She objected to the way her character was treated in parts of the film and showed concern that two members of the police force falling in love on the job was problematic, given that they would be putting their lives in jeopardy by not reaching peak efficiency. Daly was permitted to read the drafts of the script developed by Riesner and had significant leeway in the development of her character, although after seeing the film at the premiere, was horrified by the extent of the violence. Regarding Callahan's relationship with Moore, Eastwood stated:

I didn't see Dirty Harry going for a Hollywood-type glamour girl. He's the kind of guy that when he dated somebody, it was probably a secretary or receptionist somewhere, somebody he would meet along the way...Tyne Daly was perfect for the part. It starts out like great love should, it starts out...by earning respect and she earns his respect and then you think, "Could be, could go another step."

=== Filming ===
When production began, the working title of the film was Dirty Harry III, in keeping with other sequels of the time. Eastwood felt that the film needed a title of its own, and in the middle of production came up with The Enforcer.

After his disputes with Ted Post on the set of the previous Dirty Harry installment, Eastwood fully intended to direct The Enforcer himself. Eastwood's replacement of Philip Kaufman on The Outlaw Josey Wales (and the consequent need to handle post-production on that film) left him without enough time to prepare himself to direct The Enforcer. As a result, Eastwood gave the director's chair to James Fargo, his longtime assistant director, who made his debut as a full director on this film. Eastwood had the final say on all the critical decisions, but since the two men were far more familiar with each other's working styles than Eastwood had been with Ted Post, they rarely butted heads during production.

Filming commenced in the San Francisco Bay area in the summer of 1976. Eastwood was initially still dubious about the quantity of his lines and preferred a less talkative approach, something perhaps embedded in him by Sergio Leone. The film ended up considerably shorter than the previous Dirty Harry films, and was cut to 95 minutes for its final running time.

The music score for The Enforcer was written by Jerry Fielding, making The Enforcer the only Dirty Harry film without a score by Lalo Schifrin. The film was originally intended to be the last Dirty Harry film of a trilogy. A poll conducted by Warner Bros. in 1983 led to the development of a fourth film, Sudden Impact, and the resurrection of the film series. Eastwood never intended to make more Dirty Harry films, but private agreements with the studio allowed him to do more "personal" films in exchange for doing the subsequent sequels.

== Reception ==
=== Critical response ===
Richard Eder of The New York Times was negative, stating: "Money, the big name of Clint Eastwood, a lot of gore and howling sirens and the urge to rail at various liberal notions are not enough to make even a passable movie out of The Enforcer". Roger Ebert of the Chicago Sun-Times was positive and called it "the best of the Dirty Harry movies at striking a balance between the action and the humor. Sometimes in the previous films, we felt uneasy laughing in between the bloodshed, but this time, the movie's more thoughtfully constructed and paced." Gene Siskel of the Chicago Tribune gave the film two stars out of four and wrote, "the major disappointment in The Enforcer is its disjointed script with its relative absence of thrills." Another criticism he had was that Harry's opponents were now "cartoon idiots" in contrast with the memorable Scorpio from the first Dirty Harry film. Arthur D. Murphy of Variety indicated that the Dirty Harry "format seems to be falling apart at the seams," concluding, "The next project from this particular mold had better shape up or give up." Kevin Thomas of the Los Angeles Times called it "Clint Eastwood's third and arguably best Dirty Harry movie," with "a good cast" and "unprecedented humor" that "results from the film's tonic, highly developed sense of the absurd that runs through its fast-paced mayhem." Gary Arnold of The Washington Post wrote that the film "lacks both the effective gimmicks and the slambang kinetic force of its predecessors. Elements that once generated some melodramatic heat have cooled into inside jokes and aged into venerable wheezes." Janet Maslin stated in Newsweek that "The Enforcer shows very little understanding of the charismatic single-mindedness that made Clint Eastwood's Inspector Harry Callahan such a crowd pleaser in the first place ... each of the two sequels – the first was Magnum Force – has paid less attention to Harry's righteous indignation than to the mayhem he generates. The gore has now become so gratuitous that Harry has begun to look like a trigger-happy fool."

Eastwood was named "Worst Actor of the Year" by The Harvard Lampoon, and the film was criticized for its level of violence.

Eastwood's performance in the third installment was overshadowed by positive reviews given to Daly as the strong-minded female cop, with which she would follow up a similar role as Det. Mary Beth Lacey in the television series Cagney & Lacey. Daly received rave reviews, with Marjorie Rosen remarking that Malpaso "had invented a heroine of steel" and Jean Hoelscher of The Hollywood Reporter praising Eastwood for abandoning his ego in casting such a strong female actress in his film. Rotten Tomatoes retrospectively gave the film a score of 68% with a mean of 6.2 of a possible 10 based on reviews from 40 critics. Its critics consensus reads: "Though the slightest hints of series fatigue begin to emerge, The Enforcer delivers riveting action and better humor than its predecessors."

=== Box office ===
Upon release in December 1976, The Enforcer was a major commercial success, grossing $8,851,288 in its first week from over 650 theatres, a record opening for a Clint Eastwood film at the time.

It grossed a total of $46,236,000 in the United States and Canada, making it the ninth-highest-grossing film of 1976. Overall, this figure made it the most profitable of the Dirty Harry series for seven years until the release of Sudden Impact (1983).

== Bibliography ==
- Hughes, Howard (2009). Aim for the Heart. London: I.B. Tauris. ISBN 978-1-84511-902-7.
- McGilligan, Patrick (1999). Clint: The Life and Legend. London: HarperCollins. ISBN 978-0-312-29032-0.
- Street, Joe (2016). Dirty Harry's America: Clint Eastwood, Harry Callahan, and the Conservative Backlash. University Press of Florida. ISBN 978-0-8130-6167-2.
