= Dirty Harry round =

- Place of origin: United Kingdom

Production history
- Designer: BAE Systems

Specifications
- Parent case: 5.56×45mm
- Bullet diameter: 5.56 mm (0.219 in)
- Overall length: 45 mm (1.8 in)

Dirty Harry is the name given to the special round chambered 5.56×45mm. The rounds are designed by BAE Systems and were safety and performance tested by QinetiQ to supplement the existing 5.56 standard NATO ammunition issued to British Forces.

== Background ==
The necessity to use a more powerful round in place of regular 5.56mm NATO round was felt due to its unsatisfactory performance in medium-range engagements.

This resulted in the Ministry of Defence (MoD) requesting the development of a special round to be used from the existing SA80 rifles resulting in Dirty Harry.

The reference inaccurately refers to the bullet fired by Clint Eastwood's fictional character Dirty Harry in the eponymous movie series. Eastwood's character actually fired a .44 magnum load from his iconic Smith & Wesson Model 29 revolver, neither the same charge nor the same bullet as any .45 caliber round, including the 5.56×45mm. Still, the Ministry of Defence (MoD)'s intent was likely more about shock and awe than it was about the actual ordinance characteristics itself.

== Status ==
The ammunition was tested in 2010 in the Future Dismounted Close Combat research program.
