= The Gauntlet (film) =

1977 American action thriller film by Clint Eastwood

- Theatrical release poster by Frank Frazetta
- Directed by: Clint Eastwood
- Written by: Michael Butler Dennis Shryack; Clint Eastwood (uncredited)
- Produced by: Robert Daley
- Starring: Clint Eastwood Sondra Locke
- Cinematography: Rexford L. Metz
- Edited by: Joel Cox Ferris Webster
- Music by: Jerry Fielding
- Production company: The Malpaso Company
- Distributed by: Warner Bros.
- Release date: December 21, 1977
- Running time: 109 minutes
- Country: United States
- Language: English
- Budget: $5.5 million
- Box office: $35.4 million

The Gauntlet is a 1977 American action thriller film directed by Clint Eastwood, who stars alongside Sondra Locke. The film's supporting cast includes Pat Hingle, William Prince, Bill McKinney, and Mara Corday. Eastwood plays a down-and-out cop who falls in love with a prostitute (Locke), whom he is assigned to escort from Las Vegas to Phoenix for her to testify against the mob.

== Plot ==
Ben Shockley, an alcoholic Phoenix police detective, is assigned to extradite witness Augustina "Gus" Mally from Las Vegas. His superior, Commissioner Edgar Blakelock, remarks that she is a "nothing witness" for a "nothing trial". Upon meeting Mally, he finds that she is a belligerent prostitute with mob ties who is convinced that she and Shockley are being set up. Shockley dismisses her concerns, but changes his mind when he learns that local bookmakers are taking bets on whether Mally will live to testify.

The car he arranges to pick them up is bombed and Mally's house is subsequently fired on by the police after Shockley is framed for kidnapping and attempted murder. Shockley and Mally hijack a county constable at gunpoint and force him to drive them across the border to Arizona. When the constable attempts to alert local authorities, he is killed by a brigade of mob hitmen. Forced to camp for the night, Shockley stumbles across a biker rally and bluffs them into leaving, while also obtaining a motorcycle.

Blakelock is revealed to be responsible for the setup; he is secretly in the pocket of the mob and had engaged in sadomasochistic sexual abuse with Mally, who had memorized his face. ADA John Feyderspiel is also shown to be involved as part of a conspiracy to thwart Arizona's prosecution of Vegas mobster Angelo Deluca.

While stopping in a small town for a meal, the two are ambushed by a police helicopter sent by Blakelock; Shockley lures it into an area filled with high-altitude power lines and the chopper eventually explodes after striking a pylon. The motorcycle is disabled by a stray bullet, so they hop on a train, on which, coincidentally, the same two bikers whose wheels they had "borrowed" are riding. The bikers beat Shockley and attempt to rape Mally. Shockley is only barely able to retrieve his gun and force them off. Shockley and Mally both realize that going back to Phoenix will be suicide, but it is the only way to prove their innocence.

Following a night together where they choose to marry, Shockley has Mally hold up a bus while he throws out the luggage. After reinforcing the driver's seat with armored plating, they drive into Phoenix using a route Shockley had purposefully mailed to Blakelock. Maynard Josephson, Shockley's former partner, warns the two of a gauntlet of armed police officers whom Blakelock has set up to "welcome" them. Josephson convinces Shockley to turn himself in to Feyderspiel, whom he mistakenly thinks will help them. As the pair follows Josephson to a patrol car, Josephson is shot dead by snipers from a nearby building, and Shockley is hit in the leg.

With no other option, the two return to the bus and enter the town. The bus is shot at as it runs the titular "gauntlet" of hundreds of armed officers lining both sides of the road, until it reaches the steps of City Hall, finally immobilized. Shockley emerges and begins to walk inside with Mally when Blakelock and Feyderspiel confront them. A panicking Blakelock grabs the nearest officer's gun and murders Feyderspiel, but runs out of ammunition before he can finish Shockley. Mally grabs Shockley's revolver and shoots the commissioner dead. Realizing Blakelock's crimes, the rest of the assembled officers watch as Shockley and Mally walk away safely from the gauntlet.

== Cast ==
- Clint Eastwood as Detective Ben Shockley
- Sondra Locke as Augustina "Gus" Mally
- Pat Hingle as Detective Maynard Josephson
- William Prince as Commissioner Edgar A. Blakelock
- Bill McKinney as the Constable
- Michael Cavanaugh as Assistant District Attorney John Feyderspiel
- Carole Cook as The Waitress
- Mara Corday as Jail Matron
- Jeff Morris as Desk Sergeant
- Doug McGrath as Bookie
- Roy Jenson as Biker
- Dan Vadis as Biker

== Production ==
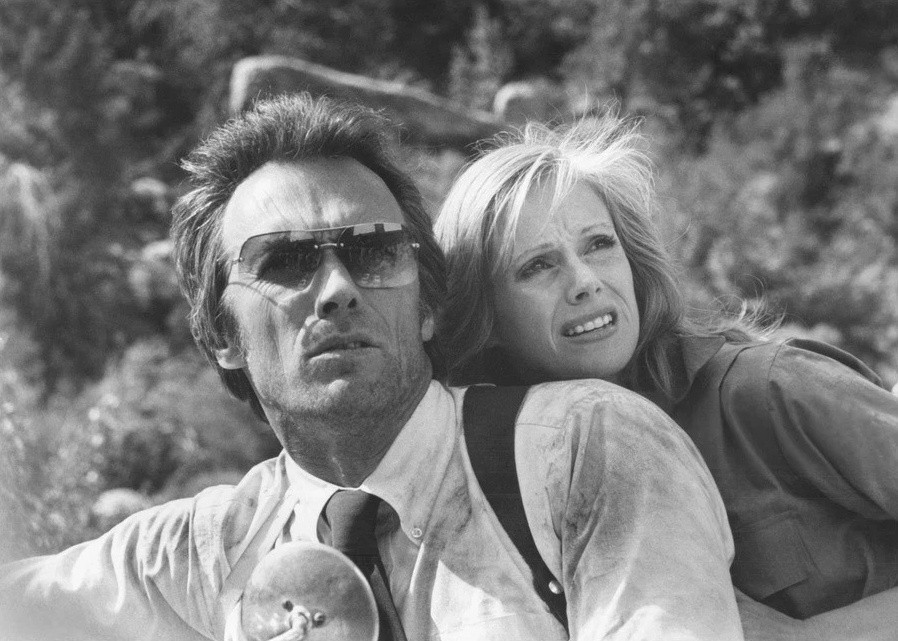
Clint Eastwood as Ben Shockley and Sondra Locke as Augustina Mally

Written by Dennis Shryack and Michael Butler, the film was originally set to star Marlon Brando and Barbra Streisand; Brando subsequently withdrew and was replaced by Steve McQueen. However, differences between McQueen and Streisand ultimately led to their joint departure in favor of Eastwood and Locke. (Note: Eastwood would eventually date Streisand for a brief period in 1989 immediately after breaking up with Locke.) Some preproduction discussion occurred regarding transforming the Ben Shockley role into a fourth Dirty Harry portrayal. The Gauntlet was filmed in Phoenix, Arizona, and Las Vegas, Nevada, as well as in nearby deserts in both states. Several scenes were made under the Tempe bridge between Phoenix and Tempe. The set for the house scene was built at a cost of $250,000 and included 7,000 drilled holes that would include explosive squibs for its demolition. The helicopter chase scene included a helicopter that was built without an engine for the crash sequence. To simulate the gunshots from the gauntlet of officers at the end of the film, the bus was blasted with 8,000 squibs. From the total budget of $5.5 million, one million dollars were spent on the various action sequences. Locke wore a hairpiece under her own hair to increase its apparent thickness and length.

== Promotion ==
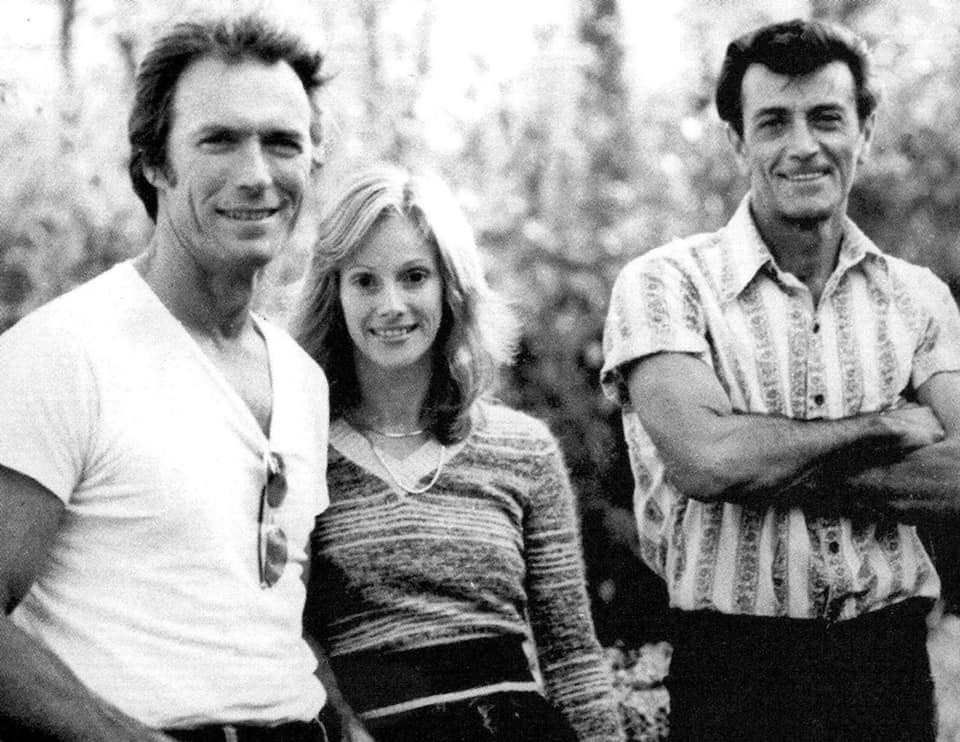
Eastwood and Locke visited the home of painter Frank Frazetta to retrieve his artwork for the film's ad.

Frank Frazetta painted the super-stylized promotional billboard poster for the film. The poster features a "muscled colossus Eastwood, brandishing a pistol, and scantily clad Locke, her clothes teasingly shredded, clinging onto her hero".

== Reception ==
=== Box office ===
The Gauntlet grossed $35.4 million at the box office, making it the 14th-highest-grossing film of 1977.

=== Critical response ===
Although a hit with the public, the critics were mixed about the film.

Roger Ebert gave the film three stars out of four and called it "classic Clint Eastwood: fast, furious, and funny. It tells a cheerfully preposterous story with great energy and a lot of style, and nobody seems more at home in this sort of action movie than Eastwood." Vincent Canby of The New York Times called it "a movie without a single thought in its head, but its action sequences are so ferociously staged that it's impossible not to pay attention most of the time." Arthur D. Murphy of Variety wrote, "At the very least, Eastwood periodically tries something different, and if the price of that is a run of formula programmers, let it be." Gene Siskel of the Chicago Tribune gave the film one-and-a-half stars out of four and stated, "This is a very stupid movie. Supposedly, it's all meant to be in good fun. And true, the script does have the dialog of a comic book. But there is not one bit of wit in the film." Kevin Thomas of the Los Angeles Times declared, "Until it overreaches in its final minutes, Clint Eastwood's 'The Gauntlet' succeeds in making the fantastic credible. Indeed, the getting there is so outrageous and witty that those who admire Eastwood's laconic style behind the camera as well as in front of it are likely to overlook that flawed finale. At any rate, there's plenty going on at all times to please action fans." Gary Arnold of The Washington Post wrote, "If 'The Gauntlet' improves on Eastwood's customary box-office success, I hope it will be ascribed to the glimmers of old-fashioned romantic devotion and the expressions of support for middle-class stability and respectability that have been allowed to mitigate the usual nihilistic mayhem." Judith Crist of the New York Post thought that the film was "a mindless compendium of stale plot and stereotyped characters varnished with foul language and garnished with violence." David Ansen of Newsweek wrote, "You don't believe a minute of it, but at the end of the quest, it's hard not to chuckle and cheer."

On the review aggregator website Rotten Tomatoes, 75% of 28 critics' reviews are positive, with an average rating of 6/10. The website's consensus reads: "Eastwood has a good time playing a dolt in the surprisingly funny The Gauntlet, which otherwise has the typical Clint trappings." Metacritic, which uses a weighted average, assigned the film a score of 59 out of 100, based on 10 critics, indicating "mixed or average" reviews.

== Soundtrack ==
The Gauntlet

Soundtrack album by Jerry Fielding
- Released: 1978
- Recorded: September 13 & 15, 1977; The Burbank Studios Hollywood, California
- Genre: Film score
- Length: 31:07
- Labels: Warner Bros. BSK 3144

The film score was composed and conducted by Jerry Fielding featuring soloists Art Pepper and Jon Faddis; the soundtrack album was released on the Warner Bros. label in 1978.

=== Reception ===
Professional ratings
Review scores
Source	Rating
Allmusic	4.5/5 stars

The AllMusic review by Donald A. Guarisco states: "All in all, The Gauntlet is a strong, consistently engaging album that is well worth a listen for any soundtrack buff whose tastes lean toward the 'crime jazz' sound".

=== Musicians ===
- Art Pepper - alto saxophone
- Jon Faddis - trumpet
- Unidentified orchestra conducted by Jerry Fielding

== See also ==
- List of American films of 1977
- 16 Blocks
- The Hitman's Bodyguard

== Bibliography ==
- Eliot, Marc (2011). Steve McQueen: A Biography. New York: Three Rivers Press. ISBN 978-0-307-45322-8.
- Hughes, Howard (2009). Aim for the Heart. London: I.B. Tauris. ISBN 978-1-84511-902-7.
- McGilligan, Patrick (1999). Clint: The Life and Legend. London: HarperCollins. ISBN 0-00-638354-8.
- Munn, Michael (1992). Clint Eastwood: Hollywood's Loner. London: Robson Books. ISBN 0-86051-790-X.
