= Dirty Harry (canceled video game) =

- Developers: The Collective (PS3/X360); Sensory Sweep (DS/PSP/PS2/Xbox/Wii/PC)
- Publisher: Warner Bros. Interactive
- Platforms: Windows; PlayStation 2; Xbox; Wii; Nintendo DS; PlayStation Portable; Xbox 360; PlayStation 3
- Release: Canceled
- Genre: Action

Dirty Harry is a canceled video game that was in development by The Collective for the PlayStation 3 and Xbox 360, and Sensory Sweep Studios for its other versions, intended to be published by Warner Bros. Interactive. The game was to continue the story of the 1971 film of the same name starring Clint Eastwood as Dirty Harry, the protagonist. Eastwood was intended to reprise his role, lending his voice and likeness as well as consulting and creative input. The game was to follow the same storyline of the film, with the San Francisco detective tracking down a serial killer named Scorpio. Gene Hackman, Lucy Liu, and Laurence Fishburne were also set to provide their likenesses and voices for roles in the game's cast. Versions were planned for the PlayStation 2, Xbox, Wii, PlayStation 3 and Xbox 360 consoles, the Nintendo DS and PlayStation Portable (PSP) handhelds, and Windows, with a planned release date of 2007.

== Story ==
The game was to take place between Dirty Harry (1971) and Magnum Force (1973), with the aim being to give more depth to the character.

== Development ==
Loose Cannon Studios, a game development company based in Seattle, proposed the concept of a video game based on the Dirty Harry IP to Warner Brothers Interactive as early as April 2006. The game's development was handed over to The Collective, who took over the game's development.

A trailer for the game has been the only example given of the game's gameplay or engine capabilities. It is neither a computer generated cutscene nor actual gameplay. Instead, Warner Bros. gave its models and engine schematics to an animation house to produce a simulation of the gameplay.

The trailer ends with the classic scene from Dirty Harry. The "Do I feel lucky?" line was pulled straight from the film as Clint Eastwood never recorded a voice over for the video game.

Warner Bros. was reluctant to release details on the gameplay, but offered a few hints. An early concept for the game featured a free-roaming San Francisco. However, after the game was put into full development in February 2006, this idea was dropped in favor of a "mission-based" structure.

One key aspect of gameplay was discussed in slight detail. As in the films, Dirty Harry walks the line between bad cop and psychopath. Players were also to walk that line. The game was to feature reactive AI, both for crooks and cops. While there was no further explanation, it appeared that if the player was soft on crooks, they may not take Harry Callahan seriously. On the other end, excessive force will put you in trouble with the police chief.

Before its cancellation, Eastwood was set to reprise his role in the game saying he accepted because: "I get to be me as a young guy again […] Revisit my youth."

== Promotion ==
According to official press releases by Warner Bros., "Dirty Harry helped define a genre and introduced the world to a character who has since become a cultural icon, so bringing Clint Eastwood's authentic Dirty Harry character to this next generation of consoles provides exciting promise for game playing audiences everywhere", said Jace Hall, senior vice president of Warner Bros. Interactive Entertainment. "Our work with The Collective is aimed at culminating in a game with an all-new story that allows players to experience the action and suspense of the legendary franchise firsthand."

"Working with Warner Bros. Interactive Entertainment and Clint Eastwood to create a compelling, state-of-the-art game that brings Dirty Harry Callahan to life on next generation consoles is very exciting", said Doug Hare, co-founder and Vice President of Production for The Collective. "We are focused on creating genre defining story-telling gameplay, along with next generation graphics depicting action-packed sequences that are consistent with the renowned films."

== Cancelation ==
The game was canceled in 2007 due to reported "trouble" at The Collective, which was later revealed to be budgetary issues and a rushed schedule—along with their then-recent merger with Shiny Entertainment to form Double Helix Games.
