= Joel Cox =

American film editor

- Born: April 2, 1942 (age 84); Los Angeles, California, United States
- Occupation: Film editor
- Years active: 1969–present

Joel Cox (born April 2, 1942) is an American film editor. He is best known for collaborating with Clint Eastwood in 33 films.

== Life and career ==
Cox has been working in film since appearing as a baby in Random Harvest (1942). He started in the mailroom at Warner Bros. in 1961. Rudi Fehr, a well-known editor and executive at Warner Bros., made Cox an apprentice editor about 3 years later. As was common in the era, Cox worked as an uncredited assistant for several years. His first credit as an assistant editor was for The Rain People, which was directed by Francis Ford Coppola and edited by Barry Malkin. His first credit as the editor was for Farewell, My Lovely (1975), which was directed by Dick Richards and co-edited by the veteran editor Walter A. Thompson. Cox had just finished working as Thompson's assistant on Rafferty and the Gold Dust Twins (1975), which was also directed by Richards. Cox worked on two more of Richards' films, March or Die (1977 - as assistant editor) and Death Valley (1982).

Cox has had a notable collaboration with Clint Eastwood that commenced with the 1976 film The Outlaw Josey Wales, for which Cox was Ferris Webster's assistant. Cox and Webster were co-editors on The Gauntlet (1977) and on several more of Eastwood's subsequent films. Starting with Sudden Impact (1983), Cox became Eastwood's principal editor. Cox has been quoted as saying that, over their 30-year partnership, Eastwood has re-cut only a single scene that Cox put together. Gary D. Roach, who worked as Cox's assistant from the mid-1990s, became Cox's co-editor on Eastwood's films with Letters from Iwo Jima (2006). Cox's long streak editing each of Eastwood's films ended with Sully, which was edited by another of his former assistants, Blu Murray.

In addition to his career in the film industry, since 2000 Cox and his family have owned and managed Mystic Hills Vineyard and winery near Paso Robles, California.

Cox won the 1992 Academy Award for Best Film Editing for Unforgiven. He has been elected as a member of the American Cinema Editors. On November 25, 2008, Clint Eastwood presented Cox the first Ignacy Paderewski Lifetime Achievement Award, which is named in honor of the piano virtuoso who called Paso Robles home, at the first Paso Robles Digital Film Festival. He received a nomination for the 2009 BAFTA Award for Best Editing for Changeling and for the 2015 Academy Award for Best Film Editing for American Sniper.

== Filmography ==
The 2008 Paso Robles Digital Film Festival provides a full filmography of Joel Cox as part of his Lifetime Achievement Award.

=== Editor ===
Year	Film	Director	Notes
2024	Juror No. 2	Clint Eastwood	with David S. Cox
2021	Cry Macho	Clint Eastwood	with David S. Cox
2019	Richard Jewell	Clint Eastwood	
2018	The Mule	Clint Eastwood	
2018	Den of Thieves	Christian Gudegast	with David S. Cox, Nathan Godley
2017	All Eyez on Me	Benny Boom	
2014	American Sniper	Clint Eastwood	with Gary D. Roach
2014	Jersey Boys	Clint Eastwood	with Gary D. Roach
2013	Prisoners	Denis Villeneuve	with Gary D. Roach
2012	Trouble with the Curve	Robert Lorenz	with Gary D. Roach
2011	J. Edgar	Clint Eastwood	with Gary D. Roach
2010	Hereafter	Clint Eastwood	with Gary D. Roach
2009	Invictus	Clint Eastwood	with Gary D. Roach
2008	Gran Torino	Clint Eastwood	with Gary D. Roach
2008	Changeling	Clint Eastwood	with Gary D. Roach
2007	American Masters Tony Bennett: The Music Never Ends	Bruce Ricker	(TV); Clint Eastwood Producer
2006	Letters from Iwo Jima	Clint Eastwood	with Gary D. Roach
2006	Flags of Our Fathers	Clint Eastwood	with Gary D. Roach.
2005	Budd Boetticher: A Man Can Do That	Bruce Ricker	(TV)
2004	Million Dollar Baby	Clint Eastwood	Clint Eastwood as Frankie Dunn
2003	The Blues: Piano Blues	Clint Eastwood	
2003	Mystic River	Clint Eastwood	Original Music by Clint Eastwood
2002	Blood Work	Clint Eastwood	Clint Eastwood as Terry McCaleb
2000	Space Cowboys	Clint Eastwood	Clint Eastwood as Frank Corvin
1999	True Crime	Clint Eastwood	Clint Eastwood as Steve Everett
1997	Midnight in the Garden of Good and Evil	Clint Eastwood	
1997	Absolute Power	Clint Eastwood	Clint Eastwood as Luther Whitney
1997	Eastwood After Hours: Live at Carnegie Hall	Bruce Ricker	(TV)
1995	The Stars Fell on Henrietta	James Keach	
1995	The Bridges of Madison County	Clint Eastwood	Clint Eastwood as Robert Kincaid
1993	A Perfect World	Clint Eastwood	Clint Eastwood as Chief Red Garnett
1992	Unforgiven	Clint Eastwood	Clint Eastwood as William 'Bill' Munny; Won the 1992 Academy Award for Best Film Editing
1990	The Rookie	Clint Eastwood	Clint Eastwood as Nick Pulovski
1990	White Hunter Black Heart	Clint Eastwood	Clint Eastwood as John Wilson
1989	Pink Cadillac	Buddy Van Horn	Clint Eastwood as Tommy Nowak
1988	Bird	Clint Eastwood	
1988	The Dead Pool	Buddy Van Horn	Supervising editor; Eastwood as Insp. 'Dirty' Harry Callahan
1986	Heartbreak Ridge	Clint Eastwood	Clint Eastwood as Gunnery Sgt. Tom 'Gunny' Highway
1986	Ratboy	Sondra Locke	
1985	Pale Rider	Clint Eastwood	Clint Eastwood as Preacher
1984	Tightrope	Richard Tuggle	Clint Eastwood as Capt. Wes Block
1983	Sudden Impact	Clint Eastwood	Clint Eastwood as Harry Callahan
1982	Honkytonk Man	Clint Eastwood	Clint Eastwood as Red Stovall; with Ferris Webster and Michael Kelly.
1982	Death Valley	Dick Richards	
1980	Bronco Billy	Clint Eastwood	Clint Eastwood as Bronco Billy McCoy; with Ferris Webster.
1978	Every Which Way but Loose	James Fargo	Clint Eastwood as Philo Beddoe; with Ferris Webster.
1977	The Gauntlet	Clint Eastwood	Clint Eastwood as Ben Shockley; with Ferris Webster.
1976	The Enforcer	James Fargo	Clint Eastwood as Insp. 'Dirty' Harry Callahan; with Ferris Webster.
1975	Farewell, My Lovely	Dick Richards	co-edited with Walter Thompson

=== Assistant editor ===
Year	Film	Director	Job	Notes
1979	Escape from Alcatraz	Don Siegel	assistant editor	Eastwood as Frank Morris; edited by Ferris Webster.
1977	March or Die	Dick Richards	assistant editor	
1976	The Outlaw Josey Wales	Clint Eastwood	assistant editor	Eastwood as Josey Wales; edited by Ferris Webster
1975	Rafferty and the Gold Dust Twins	Dick Richards	assistant editor	Edited by Walter Thompson
1974	The Terminal Man	Mike Hodges	assistant editor	Edited by Robert L. Wolfe
1973	The All-American Boy	Charles Eastman	assistant editor	Eastman's only film as director.
1973	Cleopatra Jones	Jack Starrett	assistant editor	
1969	The Rain People	Francis Ford Coppola	assistant editor	Edited by Barry Malkin
1969	The Wild Bunch	Sam Peckinpah	assistant editor	uncredited

=== Sound department ===
Year	Film	Director	Job	Notes
1969	The Learning Tree	Gordon Parks	sound assistant	

=== Self ===
Year	Show	Episode	Notes
2006	HBO First Look	A Moment in Time... Flags of Our Fathers	
2005	Ben-Hur: The Epic That Changed Cinema		Video
2002	All on Accounta Pullin' a Trigger		Video
2000	American Masters	Clint Eastwood: Out of the Shadows	
1999	Hell Hath No Fury: The Making of 'The Outlaw Josey Wales'		Video
1993	The 65th Annual Academy Awards		Winner: Best Film Editing
1993	Clint Eastwood: The Man from Malpaso		
1992	Eastwood & Co.: Making 'Unforgiven'		

== Awards ==
Year	Result	Award	Category	Recipient(s)	Notes
2015	Nominated	Oscar	Best Film Editing	American Sniper	Shared with Gary D. Roach
2005	Nominated	Oscar	Best Film Editing	Million Dollar Baby	
1993	Won	Oscar	Best Film Editing	Unforgiven	
2005	Nominated	Eddie	Edited Feature Film - Dramatic	Million Dollar Baby	
2004	Nominated	Eddie	Best Edited Feature Film - Dramatic	Mystic River	
1993	Won	Eddie	Best Edited Feature Film	Unforgiven	
2006	Won	Hollywood Film Award	Editor of the Year		
2006	Nominated	Satellite Award	Best Film Editing	Flags of Our Fathers	
2004	Nominated	Golden Satellite Award	Best Film Editing	Mystic River	
2009	Nominated	British Academy of Film and Television Arts	BAFTA Award for Best Editing	Changeling	Shared with Gary D. Roach

== See also ==
- List of film director and editor collaborations. Clint Eastwood and Cox have had one of the longest and most prolific collaborations in film history.
