= Dirty Harry (1990 video game) =

1990 video game

- Cover art, Harry Callahan's face re-used from the poster of Sudden Impact
- Developer: Gray Matter
- Publisher: Mindscape
- Designer: Chris Gray
- Programmers: Chris Gray; Ed Zolnieryk
- Artists: Rob Anderson; Dennis Turner; Chris Arsenault
- Composers: Steven Samler; Elliot Delman
- Platform: Nintendo Entertainment System
- Release: NA: December 1990
- Genre: Action
- Mode: Single player

Dirty Harry is a 1990 video game based on the Dirty Harry film franchise starring Clint Eastwood. It was developed by Canadian studio Gray Matter and released exclusively for the Nintendo Entertainment System (NES).

== Story ==
Inspector "Dirty" Harry Callahan is a San Francisco homicide detective known for his determination to crack cases, even if it means violating police protocol and civil liberties. A powerful drug lord known as "The Anaconda" has created a burgeoning drug-smuggling operation by uniting all of San Francisco's drug gangs under his leadership. With the police unable to stop either the flow of drugs or the ensuing carnage caused by drug dealers and users, Callahan sets out to deal with all of the Anaconda's men himself, before facing down the drug lord at his secret hideout on Alcatraz.

== Gameplay ==
The game is a side-scroller in which players must guide Dirty Harry throughout San Francisco. He wears a blue suit, although it can be exchanged for a white suit. He wields his signature Smith & Wesson Model 29, and players have the ability to draw the weapon without actually firing it. The Smith & Wesson Model 29 also exhibits a recoil effect when fired. Other weapons consist of LAWs rockets, harpoon guns, and explosive remote-controlled cars. When injured, Harry's health can be restored by eating hot dogs.

The game has a room where if Harry enters it, he will be unable to leave it, as the exit is replaced with the words, "Ha, ha, ha". The only way to escape the room is to reset.

== Music ==
The music in Dirty Harry was composed by Steven Samler and Elliot Delman. The music was composed using Digital Performer for the Macintosh. Not only were the composers given credit in the game and the instruction manual, but also the back of the game's box, the only NES game to do so.

== Film references ==
The game incorporates several references to the film series. The game uses digitized speech to deliver both of Harry's famous lines: "Go ahead, make my day" and "Do I feel lucky? Well, do ya, punk?". The password for infinite lives (CLYDE) is a reference to Clyde the Orangutan from Every Which Way but Loose, the password for level two is MISTY (a reference to Play Misty for Me), both non-Dirty Harry films starring Clint Eastwood, and the password for level three is BIRD (a reference to Bird, the 1988 Charlie Parker biopic Eastwood directed without any relation to Dirty Harry). A password coded into the game that does not trigger any change in gameplay, "GUNNY", refers to Eastwood's character in Heartbreak Ridge – again, a non-Dirty Harry film.

== See also ==
- Dirty Harry (canceled video game)
