= Robert Daley (producer) =

American film producer

Robert Daley was an American film producer and assistant director.

== Biography ==
He was Clint Eastwood's producing partner from 1971 to 1980. Daley is sometimes confused with the same-named novelist who wrote Prince of the City and Year of the Dragon, among others.

He died on July 2, 2016, at his home in California.

== Filmography ==
He was a producer in all films unless otherwise noted.

=== Film ===
Year	Film	Credit	Notes	Ref.
1971	Play Misty for Me			
1971	Dirty Harry	Executive producer		
1972	Joe Kidd	Executive producer		
1973	High Plains Drifter			
1973	Breezy			
1973	Magnum Force			
1974	Thunderbolt and Lightfoot			
1975	The Eiger Sanction			
1976	The Outlaw Josey Wales			
1976	The Enforcer			
1977	The Gauntlet			
1978	Every Which Way but Loose			
1979	Escape from Alcatraz	Executive producer		
1980	Bronco Billy	Executive producer		
1980	Any Which Way You Can	Executive producer		
1985	Stick	Executive producer		
1985	Real Genius	Executive producer	Final film as a producer	

Second unit director or assistant director

Year	Film	Role	Notes
1965	Fluffy	Assistant director	Uncredited

=== Television ===
Second unit director or assistant director

Year	Title	Role
1964−65	My Living Doll	Assistant director
1965−66	I Spy	Assistant director
1966−67	12 O'Clock High	Assistant director
1967	The F.B.I.	Assistant director
1967−68	The Invaders	Assistant director
1968−70	The Doris Day Show	Assistant director
