= DeVeren Bookwalter =

American actor and film director (1939–1987)

- DeVeren Bookwalter as Bobby Maxwell in The Enforcer
- Born: September 8, 1939; Brookville, Pennsylvania, U.S.
- Died: July 23, 1987 (aged 47); New York City, U.S.
- Occupations: Actor; director
- Years active: 1963–1984
- Spouse(s): Ruth Kidder; 1 child

DeVeren Bookwalter (September 8, 1939 – July 23, 1987) was an American actor and director. He primarily appeared in theater, though he did have several film roles. DeVeren was the first person to win three Los Angeles Drama Critics Circle Awards for his production, direction, and performance in Cyrano de Bergerac at the Globe Playhouse in 1975.

Bookwalter served as a member of the board of trustees of the Society of Stage Directors and Choreographers, a member of the Actors' Equity Association, the Screen Actors Guild, and the American Federation of Television and Radio Artists.

== Biography ==
=== Career ===
Bookwalter appeared in many roles at the Globe in Los Angeles, notably as Feste in Twelfth Night, Cyrano in Cyrano de Bergerac, Hamlet, and Richard III in 1976, as well as video productions of Shakespeare's Richard II and Othello. He performed at the Old Globe Theatre in San Diego in the 1978 National Shakespeare Festival, in the title role in Henry V and in A Midsummer Night's Dream and The Winter's Tale. His film appearances include Andy Warhol's Blow Job (1963), The Omega Man (1971), The Enforcer (1976) as Bobby Maxwell, and the TV movie Evita Perón (1981) co-starring Faye Dunaway, as well as numerous appearances on the soap operas Ryan's Hope and Another World.

=== Death ===
A resident of Manhattan during the late 1980s, Bookwalter died on July 23, 1987, of stomach cancer, aged 47, at St. Vincent's Hospital in New York City.

== Filmography ==
Year	Title	Role	Notes
1964	Blow Job	Recipient	Uncredited
1971	The Omega Man	Family Member	
1973	Magnum Force	Naked man on bed snorting cocaine with prostitute	Uncredited
1976	The Enforcer	Bobby Maxwell	
1977	Cover Girls	Karl	Television film
1978	Manhole		Credited as: Eric Swenson
1981	Evita Peron	Peron's Aide	Television film
