= Joe Kidd =

1972 film by John Sturges

- Film poster by Bill Gold
- Directed by: John Sturges
- Written by: Elmore Leonard
- Produced by: Sidney Beckerman; Robert Daley
- Starring: Clint Eastwood; Robert Duvall; John Saxon
- Cinematography: Bruce Surtees
- Edited by: Ferris Webster
- Music by: Lalo Schifrin
- Color process: Technicolor
- Production company: The Malpaso Company
- Distributed by: Universal Pictures
- Release date: July 19, 1972
- Running time: 88 minutes
- Country: United States
- Language: English
- Box office: $6.3 million (North American rentals)

Joe Kidd is a 1972 American Revisionist Western film starring Clint Eastwood and Robert Duvall, written by Elmore Leonard and directed by John Sturges. The film is about an ex-bounty hunter hired by a wealthy landowner named Frank Harlan to track down Mexican revolutionary leader Luis Chama, who is fighting for land reform. It forms part of the Revisionist Western genre.

== Plot ==
In the town of Sinola in New Mexico in the early 1900s, Joe Kidd, a disaffected former bounty hunter, is in jail for hunting on Indian land and disturbing the peace. Mexican bandito/revolutionary Luis Chama has organized a peasant revolt against the local landowners who are throwing the poor off their ancestral lands and raids the courthouse. A posse is formed by wealthy landowner Frank Harlan to capture Chama. Kidd is invited to join but declines. Harlan persists and Kidd relents when he learns that Chama's band has raided his ranch and attacked one of the workers there. The posse is made up of numerous ruthless men, some of them armed with new-style rifles that have a much greater range than previous types.

The posse rides into a village near Chama's hideout and forces the villagers into the church at gunpoint. They threaten to kill five Mexican hostages unless Chama surrenders. Harlan no longer trusts Kidd and throws him into the church too, to prevent him from helping Helen, a female captive who unbeknownst to Harlan is also Chama's lady love, and the other Mexican hostages. Kidd manages a daring escape. He saves the hostages by finding Chama and his associates and forcing them to comply with his wishes. He lets Harlan and the posse know he will deliver Chama to Sheriff Mitchell in town. The posse moves ahead to intercept a train back to Sinola, while a lone shooter engages Kidd and his party; these are pinned down as Mingo, the best shot of Harlan's group, has a high-powered rifle and is firing from the rocks above. However, Kidd, who managed to also obtain one of the posse's long-range rifles during his escape, now assembles the gun and manages to kill Mingo.

When Kidd and the captured Chama arrive in town they discover Harlan is already there with the rest of the posse survivors and planning to kill them all. Kidd intends to go through with his plan. To get to the jail, Kidd drives a steam train through the town saloon. A gunfight ensues between Kidd and Harlan's men. Kidd triumphs over the other men and manages to kill Harlan in the courthouse by hiding in the judge's chair. Chama then surrenders to Mitchell. Because the sheriff had punched him during the poaching arrest, Kidd punches the sheriff, then collects his things and leaves town with Helen.

== Cast ==
- Clint Eastwood as Joe Kidd
- Robert Duvall as Frank Harlan
- John Saxon as Luis Chama
- Don Stroud as Lamarr Simms
- Stella Garcia as Helen Sanchez
- James Wainwright as Olin Mingo
- Paul Koslo as Roy Gannon
- Gregory Walcott as Sinola County Sheriff Bob Mitchell
- Dick Van Patten as Hotel Manager
- Lynne Marta as Elma
- John Carter as Judge
- Pepe Hern as Priest
- Joaquín Martínez as Manolo
- Ron Soble as Ramon
- Clint Ritchie as Calvin
- Pepe Callahan as "Naco"

== Production ==
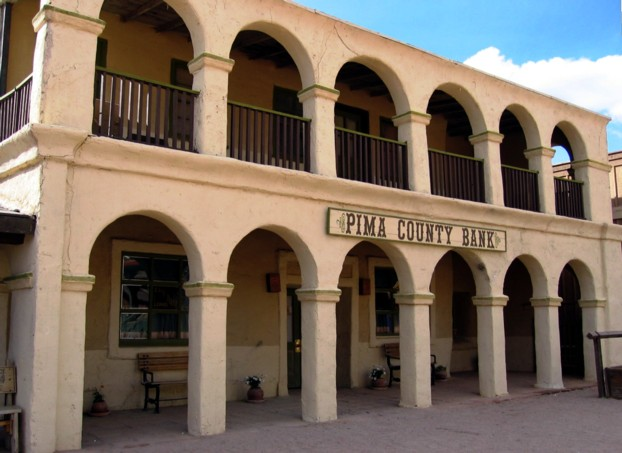
Sets on the Old Tucson Studios outside Tucson, Arizona.

Eastwood was given the script by Jennings Lang, written by novelist Elmore Leonard. Originally called The Sinola Courthouse Raid, it was about a character inspired by Reies Tijerina, an ardent supporter of Robert F. Kennedy, known for storming a courthouse in Tierra Amarilla, New Mexico in an incident in June 1967, taking hostages and demanding that the Hispanic people have their ancestral lands returned to them. Leonard depicted Tijerina in his story, a man he named Luis Chama, as an egomaniac, a role that went to John Saxon. Robert Duvall was cast as Frank Harlan, a ruthless landowner who hires Eastwood's character, a former frontier guide named Joe Kidd, to track down the culprits and scare them away. Don Stroud, who had appeared alongside Eastwood in Coogan's Bluff, was cast as another sour villain who antagonizes Joe Kidd.

Directed by John Sturges, who had previously helmed such westerns as Gunfight at the O.K. Corral (1957), The Magnificent Seven (1960) and Hour of the Gun (1967), filming began in Old Tucson in November 1971, overlapping with another film production, John Huston's The Life and Times of Judge Roy Bean, which was just wrapping up shooting. Outdoor sequences to the film were shot near Bishop, California, southeast of Yosemite National Park. The actors were initially uncertain about the strength of the three main characters in the film and how the hero Joe Kidd would come across. According to writer Leonard, the initial slow development between the three was probably because the cast was so initially awestruck by having Sturges direct that they surrendered authority to him. Eastwood was not in perfect health during the film, suffering from symptoms that suggested a bronchial infection, in addition to having several panic attacks, falsely reported in the media as his having an allergy to horses. During production, the script for the finale was altered when producer Robert Daley jokingly said that a train should crash through the barroom in the climax, and he was taken seriously by cast and crew, who thought it was a great idea.

It was one of several movies where Saxon played a Mexican, also known as brownface.

== Reception ==
Joe Kidd was released in the United States in July 1972, and it ultimately returned $5.8 million in domestic rentals, making it one of the highest-grossing Westerns of the year. The film received a mixed reception from critics. Roger Greenspun of The New York Times wrote: "For perhaps its first half-hour, John Sturges's new Western, Joe Kidd, looks surprisingly good ... Nothing remarkable, but modestly decent—a feeling that persists, with continually diminishing assurance, almost until the climax, when everything is thrown away in a flash of false theatrics, foolish symbolism and what I suspect is sloppy editing." Roger Ebert of the Chicago Sun-Times gave the film two stars out of four and wrote: "All I can tell you about Clint Eastwood in Joe Kidd is that he plays a ruthless gunman of few words. This isn't exactly a surprise; Eastwood almost always plays a ruthless gunman, etc. The funny thing about Joe Kidd, though, is that we can't keep straight whose side he's on, or why." Gene Siskel of the Chicago Tribune awarded the same two-star grade and said: "Filled with all manner of inconsistencies, the Joe Kidd character is really a prop for a series of violent incidents, most of which are either lifted from other pictures or totally unbelievable. If these violent actions were in some way thrilling I suppose their source or believability wouldn't be much of an issue, but they are not, and Director John Sturges' listless pacing of them only intensifies their blandness." Variety wrote: "Not enough identity is given Eastwood in a New Mexico land struggle in which no reason is apparent for his involvement, but John Sturges' direction of the Elmore Leonard screenplay is sufficiently compelling to keep guns popping and bodies falling." Kevin Thomas of the Los Angeles Times called it "a concise, solidly crafted western that attests to the continuing flexibility of its durable genre." The New York Post praised the actors' performances while criticizing the film, calling the actors "diamonds set in dung".

On Rotten Tomatoes the film has an approval rating of 80% based on reviews from 10 critics with a mean of 6.8 of a possible 10. Metacritic, which uses a weighted average, assigned the film a score of 52 out of 100, based on 6 critics, indicating "mixed or average" reviews.

== See also ==
- List of American films of 1972

== Bibliography ==
- Hughes, Howard (2009). Aim for the Heart. London: I.B. Tauris. ISBN 978-1-84511-902-7.
- McGilligan, Patrick (1999). Clint: The Life and Legend. London: HarperCollins. ISBN 0-00-638354-8.
