= Dirty Harry (pinball) =

1995 pinball machine

- Dirty Harry flyer
- Manufacturer: Williams
- Release date: March 1995
- System: Williams WPC Security (WPC-S)
- Design: Barry Oursler
- Programming: Craig Sylla and Dwight Sullivan
- Artwork: Kevin O'Connor, Pat McMahon
- Music: Vince Pontarelli
- Sound: Vince Pontarelli
- Voices: Clint Eastwood
- Animation: Scott Slomiany
- Production run: 4,248

Dirty Harry is a Williams pinball machine released in March 1995. It is based on the fictional character of the same name.

== Design ==
The game features custom speech by Clint Eastwood. Initially Clint Eastwood had been unavailable so the callouts in the game were recorded by a sound-alike. Late in the development of the game Clint Eastwood was available and recorded worse callouts than the sound-alike, but the design team was compelled to use this worse version.

The music composed by Vince Pontarelli originally used a style reminiscent of the original movie, including use of a saxophone. Some at Williams thought players would not relate to that music, and for the final design the music was changed to a high-energy rock style.

The game includes a .44 Magnum gun-plunger mechanism to launch the ball, similar to that used in 1993's Indiana Jones: The Pinball Adventure. A gun located on the lower right of the playfield can rotate and fire up to four balls in a rapid fire sequence; the design of this gun was inspired by that used in Hyperball.

The backglass shows Clint Eastwood in-character as Harry Callahan, in front of the Golden Gate bridge.

== Layout ==
The game has three flippers; above the upper flipper on the right is a magnet which can briefly hold the ball so a shot can be attempted to the left ramp from this flipper. There is another ramp which leads to the left flipper. There are two buildings, the safehouse and the warehouse.

== Gameplay ==
At the start of the game there is a selectable choice of three skillshots. After hitting five specific shots multiball can be started; this begins with a shot from the rotating gun where jackpots and super jackpots can be scored. As the orbits are hit a sequence of timed modes are played by hitting a sinkhole; if all six of these are completed then a 6-ball multiball starts.

There is also a midnight madness multiball mode called Midnight Rampage, which starts at midnight (based on the internal clock of the machine) if a game is being played.

== Reception ==
Reception was generally negative, Play Meter found the game fun to play but wondered about the popularity as there were no recent Dirty Harry films. In the March 1995 issue of Cash Box, they were mystified how it was awarded "pinball of the show" at IMA in Germany; themselves calling it merely "OK" and preferring several other games. The Flipside found the upper flipper too weak for the ramp shot, the artwork to be poor, and despite the film having good music this didn't transfer to the game.
