= Buddy Van Horn =

American stunt coordinator and film director (1928–2021)

- Born: Wayne Van Horn; August 20, 1928; Los Angeles, California, U.S.
- Died: May 11, 2021 (aged 92); Los Angeles, California, U.S.
- Occupation(s): Stunt coordinator, film director, second unit director

Wayne "Buddy" Van Horn (August 20, 1928 – May 11, 2021) was an American stunt coordinator and film director. He directed the Clint Eastwood films Any Which Way You Can (1980), The Dead Pool (1988), and Pink Cadillac (1989). A long-time stunt double for Eastwood, he was credited as the stunt coordinator on Eastwood's films from 1972 to 2011, and as second unit director on Magnum Force (1973) and The Rookie (1990). He was sometimes credited as Wayne Van Horn in the 1980s. He earlier doubled for Guy Williams on Disney's Zorro, and Gregory Peck. Van Horn's most prominent onscreen appearance is the role of Marshal Jim Duncan in the Eastwood film High Plains Drifter (1973). Van Horn died in Los Angeles on May 11, 2021, at the age of 92.

== Filmography ==
=== Director ===
- Any Which Way You Can (1980)
- The Dead Pool (1988)
- Pink Cadillac (1989)

=== Second unit director ===
- Magnum Force (1973) - Also uncredited stunt performer
- The Rookie (1990) - Also stunt performer
- Outbreak (1995) - Also stunt coordinator
- Absolute Power (1997) - Uncredited; also stunt coordinator

=== Actor ===
Year	Title	Role	Notes
1954	Destry	Townsman	Uncredited; Also uncredited stunt performer
1955	Escape to Burma		Uncredited; Also Uncredited stunt performer
1960	Spartacus	Soldier	Uncredited; Also uncredited stunt performer
1969	Paint Your Wagon	Miner	Uncredited; Also uncredited stunt performer
1971	The Beguiled	Soldier	Also uncredited stunt coordinator
1973	High Plains Drifter	Marshal Jim Duncan	Also stunt coordinator
1975	Bite the Bullet	Slim	Also uncredited stunt performer
1985	Pale Rider	Stage Driver #1	Also stunt coordinator
1988	Shakedown	Police Officer	Also stunt performer
