= R. M. Fink =

American screenwriter

Rita M. Fink
- Born: United States
- Occupation: Screenwriter
- Spouse: Harry Julian Fink

R. M. Fink (also known as Rita M. Fink) is an American screenwriter best known as one of the creators of Dirty Harry. She also co-wrote, with her husband Harry Julian Fink, films such as Big Jake (1971) and Cahill U.S. Marshal (1973).
