= Harry Julian Fink =

American screenwriter (1923–2001)

- Born: July 7, 1923; New York City, U.S.
- Died: August 8, 2001 (aged 78); La Jolla, California, U.S.
- Occupation: Screenwriter
- Spouse: Rita M. Fink

Harry Julian Fink (July 7, 1923 – August 8, 2001) was an American television and film writer, best known for Have Gun – Will Travel and as one of the creators of Dirty Harry.

Fink wrote for various television shows in the 1950s and 1960s, and also created several, including NBC's T.H.E. Cat, starring Robert Loggia, and Tate starring David McLean.

His first film work was the 1965 Sam Peckinpah film Major Dundee. He also worked on Ice Station Zebra, and, with his wife Rita M. Fink, Big Jake, Dirty Harry and Cahill U.S. Marshal.
