= Dirty Harry =

1971 film by Don Siegel

- Theatrical release poster by Bill Gold
- Directed by: Don Siegel
- Screenplay by: Harry Julian Fink; R.M. Fink; Dean Riesner
- Story by: Harry Julian Fink; R.M. Fink
- Produced by: Don Siegel
- Starring: Clint Eastwood; Harry Guardino; Reni Santoni; Andy Robinson; John Larch; John Vernon
- Cinematography: Bruce Surtees
- Edited by: Carl Pingitore
- Music by: Lalo Schifrin
- Production company: The Malpaso Company
- Distributed by: Warner Bros.
- Release date: December 23, 1971
- Running time: 102 minutes
- Country: United States
- Language: English
- Budget: $4 million
- Box office: $36 million

Dirty Harry is a 1971 American action-thriller film produced and directed by Don Siegel, the first in the Dirty Harry series. Clint Eastwood plays the title role, in his first appearance as San Francisco Police Department (SFPD) Inspector "Dirty" Harry Callahan. The film drew upon the real-life case of the Zodiac Killer as the Callahan character seeks out a similar vicious psychopath.

Dirty Harry was a critical and commercial success and set the style for a whole genre of police films. It was followed by four sequels: Magnum Force in 1973, The Enforcer in 1976, Sudden Impact in 1983, and The Dead Pool in 1988.

In 2012, the film was selected for preservation in the United States National Film Registry by the Library of Congress as being "culturally, historically, and aesthetically significant".

== Plot ==
A psychopathic sniper, later referred to as "Scorpio", shoots a woman while she swims in a San Francisco skyscraper rooftop pool. He leaves behind a threatening letter demanding he be paid $100,000 or he will kill more people. The note is found by SFPD Inspector Harry Callahan, who is investigating the killing. The mayor teams up with the police to track down the killer; to stall for time, he agrees to Scorpio's demand over Callahan's objections. During his lunch break, Harry foils a bank robbery. He shoots one robber and the getaway driver dead, and holds another at gunpoint with his Smith & Wesson Model 29 revolver, giving him an ultimatum:

I know what you're thinking: 'Did he fire six shots or only five?' Well, to tell you the truth, in all this excitement, I've kinda lost track myself. But being this is a .44 Magnum, the most powerful handgun in the world, and would blow your head clean off, you've got to ask yourself one question: 'Do I feel lucky?' Well, do you, punk?

Despite surrendering, the robber insists on knowing, and Harry pulls the trigger, revealing the gun is empty.

Harry is assigned a rookie partner, Chico Gonzalez, despite his opposition to working with yet another inexperienced police officer. Meanwhile, Scorpio is spotted by a police helicopter while staking for potential victims, but he escapes. Harry and Chico ride the beat, and Harry is assaulted by a neighborhood watch gang after they mistake Harry for a peeping tom. Chico comes to Harry's aid. After assisting in preventing a suicide, Harry and Gonzalez learn that Scorpio has murdered a 10-year-old African-American boy. Based on Scorpio's letter, the police think his next victim will be a Catholic priest, and set a trap for him.

Scorpio eventually arrives, kills a police officer in a shootout, and flees. The next day, the police receive another letter in which Scorpio claims to have kidnapped a teenager named Ann Mary Deacon. He threatens to kill her if he is not given a ransom of $200,000. Harry is assigned to deliver the money, wearing a radio earpiece so Gonzalez can secretly follow him. Scorpio instructs Harry via payphones around the city. They meet at the Mount Davidson cross, where Scorpio beats Harry and admits he intends to kill him and let Ann Mary die. Gonzalez intervenes and gets shot in the chest. Harry manages to stab Scorpio in the leg, but he escapes without the money.

Harry learns of Scorpio's hospital visit and a doctor reveals that the killer lives in a room at Kezar Stadium. Harry finds him there and chases him, shooting him in the leg. Harry tortures Scorpio into confessing where Ann Mary is being held, but the police find her dead. The district attorney reprimands Harry for his conduct, explaining that because Harry obtained his evidence against Scorpio illegally, all of it is inadmissible in court, and Scorpio is to be freed. An outraged Harry continues to shadow Scorpio on his own time. Scorpio pays a man $200 to beat him severely and frames Harry for it, forcing Harry to stop following him. Meanwhile, a hospitalized Gonzalez tells Harry of his intention to leave the SFPD and become a teacher instead.

Scorpio steals a pistol from a liquor store owner and hijacks a school bus. He contacts the police with another ransom demand that includes a flight out of the country. Harry waits for him, then jumps onto the roof of the bus from an overpass. Scorpio crashes the bus into a dirt mound and flees to a nearby quarry, where he takes a hostage before Harry wounds him. Harry aims his revolver and reprises his ultimatum about losing count of his shots. Scorpio reaches for his gun and Harry shoots. This time, the gun fires, killing Scorpio. Harry removes his police badge from his wallet, throws it into the water, and walks away.

== Cast ==
- Clint Eastwood as Inspector Harry Callahan
- Harry Guardino as Lieutenant Al Bressler
- Reni Santoni as Inspector Chico Gonzalez
- John Vernon as The Mayor of San Francisco
- Andy Robinson as Charles "Scorpio" Davis
- John Larch as Chief of Police Paul Dacanelli
- John Mitchum as Inspector Frank DiGiorgio
- Mae Mercer as Mrs. Russell
- Lyn Edgington as Norma Gonzalez
- Ruth Kobart as Marcella Platt, School Bus Driver
- Woodrow Parfrey as Mr. Jaffe
- Josef Sommer as District Attorney William T. Rothko
- Albert Popwell as Bank robber
- William Paterson as Judge Bannerman
- James Nolan as Liquor Proprietor
- Maurice S. Argent as Sid Kleinman
- Jo de Winter as Miss Willis
- Craig Kelly as Sergeant Reineke
- Debralee Scott as Ann Mary Deacon (uncredited)
- Diana Davidson as The Swimmer (uncredited)

== Production ==
=== Development ===
The script, titled Dead Right, by the husband-and-wife team of Harry Julian Fink and Rita M. Fink, was originally about a hard-edged New York City police inspector, Harry Callahan, who is determined to stop Davis, a serial killer, even if he has to skirt the law and accepted standards of policing, blurring the distinction between criminal and cop, addressing the question of how far a free, democratic society can go to protect itself. The original draft ended with a police sniper, instead of Callahan, shooting the killer. Another earlier version of the story was set in Seattle, Washington. Four more drafts of the script were written.

Although Dirty Harry is arguably Clint Eastwood's signature role, he was not a top contender for the part. The role of Harry Callahan was offered to John Wayne and Frank Sinatra, and later to Robert Mitchum, Steve McQueen, and Burt Lancaster. In his 1980 interview with Playboy, George C. Scott claimed that he was initially offered the role, but the script's violent nature led him to turn it down. When producer Jennings Lang initially could not find an actor to take the role of Callahan, he sold the film rights to ABC Television. Although ABC wanted to turn it into a TV movie, the amount of violence in the script was deemed excessive for television, so the rights were sold to Warner Bros.

Warner Bros. purchased the script with a view to casting Frank Sinatra in the lead. Sinatra was 55 at the time and since the character of Harry Callahan was originally written as a man in his mid-to-late 50s (and Eastwood was then only 41), Sinatra fit the character profile. Initially, Warner Bros. wanted either Sydney Pollack or Irvin Kershner to direct. Kershner was eventually hired when Sinatra was attached to the title role, but when Sinatra later left the film, Kershner did as well.

John Milius was asked to work on the script when Sinatra and Kershner were attached. Milius claimed he was requested to write the screenplay for Sinatra in three weeks. Terrence Malick wrote a draft of the film (dated November 1970) in which the shooter (also named Davis) was a vigilante who killed wealthy criminals who had escaped justice.

Details about the film were first released in film industry trade papers in April. After Sinatra left the project, the producers started to consider younger actors for the role. Burt Lancaster turned down the lead role because he strongly disagreed with the violent, end-justifies-the-means moral of the story. He believed the role and plot contradicted his belief in collective responsibility for criminal and social justice and the protection of individual rights. Marlon Brando was considered for the role, but was never formally approached. Both Steve McQueen and Paul Newman turned down the role. McQueen refused to make another "cop movie" after Bullitt (1968). Believing the character was too "right-wing" for him, Newman suggested that the film would be a good vehicle for Eastwood.

The screenplay was initially brought to Eastwood's attention around 1969 by Jennings Lang. Warner Bros. offered him the part while his directorial debut film Play Misty for Me was still in post production. On December 17, 1970, a Warner Bros. studio press release announced that Clint Eastwood would star in, and produce the film through his company, Malpaso.

Eastwood was given a number of scripts, but he ultimately reverted to the original as the best vehicle for him. In a 2008 MTV interview, Eastwood said "So I said, 'I'll do it,' but since they had initially talked to me, there had been all these rewrites. I said, 'I'm only interested in the original script'." Looking back on the 1971 Don Siegel film, he remembered "[The rewrites had changed] everything. They had Marine snipers coming on in the end. And I said, 'No. This is losing the point of the whole story, of the guy chasing the killer down. It's becoming an extravaganza that's losing its character.' They said, 'OK, do what you want.' So, we went and made it."

Scorpio was loosely based on the real-life Zodiac Killer, an unidentified serial killer who had committed five murders in the San Francisco Bay Area several years earlier. Elements of Gary Steven Krist were also worked into the characterization, since Scorpio, like Krist, kidnaps a young girl and buries her alive while demanding ransom. In a later novelization of the film, Scorpio was referred to as "Charles Davis", a former mental patient from Springfield, Massachusetts, who murdered his grandparents as a teenager. There are significant differences between the book and the film. Among the differences are: Scorpio's point of view – in the book, he uses astrology to make decisions (including being inspired to abduct Ann Mary Deacon), Harry working on a murder case involving a mugger before he is assigned to Scorpio, the omission of the suicide jumper, and Harry throwing away his badge at the end.

Audie Murphy was initially considered to play Scorpio, but he died in a plane crash before his decision on the offer could be made. When Kershner and Sinatra were still attached to the project, James Caan was under consideration for the role of Scorpio. The part eventually went to a relatively unknown actor, Andy Robinson. Eastwood had seen Robinson in a play called Subject to Fits and recommended him for the role of Scorpio; his unkempt appearance fit the bill for a psychologically unbalanced hippie. Siegel told Robinson that he cast him in the role of the Scorpio killer because he wanted someone "with a face like a choirboy". Robinson's portrayal was so memorable that after the film was released he was reported to have received several death threats and was forced to get an unlisted telephone number. In real life, Robinson is a pacifist who deplores the use of firearms. Early in principal photography on the film, Robinson would reportedly flinch in discomfort every time he was required to use a gun. As a result, Siegel was forced to halt production briefly and sent Robinson for brief training in order to learn how to fire a gun convincingly.

Milius says his main contribution to the film was "a lot of guns. And the attitude of Dirty Harry, being a cop who was ruthless. I think it's fairly obvious if you look at the rest of my work what parts are mine. The cop being the same as the killer except he has a badge. And being lonely ... I wanted it to be like Stray Dog; I was thinking in terms of Kurosawa's detective films." He added:

In my script version, there's just more outrageous Milius crap where I had the killer in the bus with a flamethrower. I tried to make the guy as outrageous as possible. I had him get a police photographer to take a picture of him with all the kids lined up at the school – he kidnaps them at the school, actually – and they showed the picture to the other police after he's made his demands; he wants a 747 to take him away to a country where he'll be free of police harassment [Milius laughs uproariously], terrible things like this. And the children all end up like a graduation picture, and the teacher is saying, "What is that object under Andy Robinson?" and a cop says, "That's a claymore mine." Teacher asks, "What's a claymore mine?" And we hear the voice of Harry say, "If he sets it off, they're all spaghetti." Chief says, "That's enough, Harry." Everybody said, "That's too much, John; we can't have Milius doing this kind of stuff." I wanted the guy to be just totally outrageous all the time, and he is. I think Siegel restrained it enough.

Screenwriter John Milius owns one of the actual Model 29s used in principal photography in Dirty Harry and Magnum Force. As of March 2012, it is on loan to the National Firearms Museum in Fairfax, Virginia, and is in the Hollywood Guns display in the William B. Ruger Gallery.

=== Principal photography ===
Glenn Wright, Eastwood's costume designer since Rawhide, was responsible for creating Callahan's distinctive old-fashioned brown and yellow checked jacket to emphasize his strong values in pursuing crime. Filming for Dirty Harry began in April 1971 and involved some risky stunts, with much footage shot at night and filming the city of San Francisco aerially, a technique for which the film series is renowned. Eastwood performed the stunt in which he jumps onto the roof of the hijacked school bus from a bridge, without a stunt double. His face is clearly visible throughout the shot. Eastwood also directed the suicide-jumper scene.

The line, "My, that's a big one", spoken by Scorpio when Callahan removes his gun, was an ad-lib by Robinson. The crew broke into laughter as a result of the double entendre and the scene had to be re-shot, but the line stayed.

The final scene, in which Callahan throws his badge into the water, is supposedly an homage to a similar scene from 1952's High Noon. Eastwood initially did not want to toss the badge, believing it indicated that Callahan was quitting the police department. Siegel argued that tossing the badge was instead Callahan's indication of casting away the inefficiency of the police force's rules and bureaucracy. Although Eastwood was able to convince Siegel not to have Callahan toss the badge, when the scene was filmed, Eastwood changed his mind and went with Siegel's preferred ending.

=== Filming locations ===
One evening Eastwood and Siegel had been watching the San Francisco 49ers in Kezar Stadium in the last game of the season and thought the eerie Greek amphitheater-like setting would be an excellent location for shooting one of the scenes where Callahan encounters Scorpio.

In San Francisco, California

- 555 California Street, The Bank of America Building
- California Hall, 625 Polk Street (formerly the California Culinary Academy)
- San Francisco City Hall, 1 Dr. Carlton B. Goodlett Place
- Hall of Justice – 850 Bryant Street
- Forest Hill Station
- Holiday Inn Chinatown, 750 Kearny Street – rooftop swimming pool 37°47′42.7″N 122°24′15.7″W in the opening scenes. It is now the Hilton – San Francisco Financial District.
- Kezar Stadium – Frederick Street, Golden Gate Park
- Dolores Park, Mission District – at the corner of Church and 20th Streets
- Fort Mason Tunnel – where three muggers attempt to steal the yellow suitcase from Harry
- Mount Davidson
- Sts. Peter and Paul Church, north of Washington Square, 666 Filbert Street
- Washington Square, North Beach
- Krausgrill Place, northeast of Washington Square
- Medau Place, northeast of Washington Square
- Jasper Place, alley east of Washington Square
- Big Al's strip club, 556 Broadway
- Roaring 20's strip club, 552 Broadway
- North Beach, San Francisco
- Lombard Street, San Francisco
- San Francisco General Hospital – where Harry visits Chico and his wife
- Grandview Park – where the school bus stops to let off some children and Scorpio takes the other kids and the driver hostage

In Marin County, California

- Hutchinson's Rock Quarry – scene of Callahan and Scorpio's showdown, later filled in and redeveloped as Larkspur Landing Shopping Center and Larkspur Shores Apartments, north of the Larkspur Ferry Terminal
- Greenbrae, California
- Mill Valley, California

In Los Angeles County, California

- Universal Studios Hollywood – San Francisco Street (diner / bank robbery sequence)

== Release ==
=== Theatrical release ===
The benefit world premiere of Dirty Harry was held at Loews Theaters' Market Street Cinema in San Francisco on December 22, 1971, the day before its full theatrical release on December 23, 1971.

=== Home media ===
Warner Home Video owns rights to the Dirty Harry series. The studio first released the film to VHS and Betamax in 1979. Dirty Harry (1971) has been remastered for DVD three times – in 1998, 2001 and 2008. It has been repurposed for several DVD box sets. Dirty Harry made its high-definition debut with the 2008 Blu-ray Disc. The commentator on the 2008 DVD is Clint Eastwood biographer Richard Schickel. The film, along with its sequels, has been released in high definition, on various Digital distribution services, including the iTunes Store.

== Reception ==
=== Critical reception ===
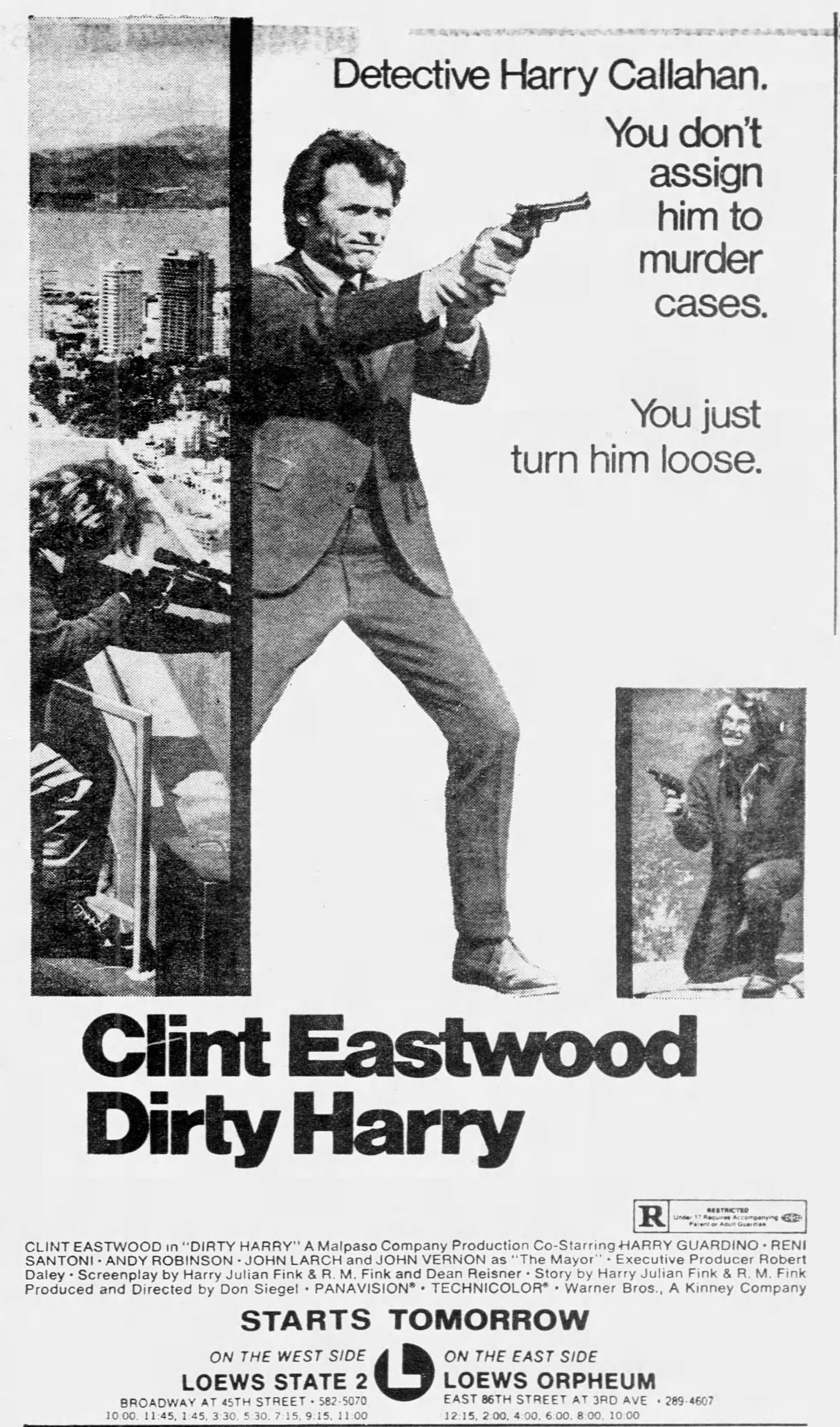
Theatrical advertisement, 1971

The film caused controversy when it was released, sparking debate over issues ranging from police brutality to victims' rights and the nature of law enforcement. At the 44th Academy Awards, feminists protested outside the Dorothy Chandler Pavilion, holding up banners that displayed messages such as "Dirty Harry is a Rotten Pig". Also, Andy Robinson's portrayal as the Scorpio Killer was so convincing that he received death threats after the film's release.

Jay Cocks of Time praised Eastwood's performance as Dirty Harry, describing him as "giving his best performance so far, tense, tough, full of implicit identification with his character". Neal Gabler also praised Eastwood's performance in the film: "There's an incredible pleasure in watching Clint Eastwood do what he does, and he does it so well." Film critic Roger Ebert gave the film three stars out of four, calling it "very effective at the level of a thriller" but denouncing its moral position as "fascist". Gene Siskel gave the film a full four out of four stars and praised it as "one of the great police thrillers of motion picture history", though he too thought that the film's message was "dangerous". Roger Greenspun of The New York Times wrote that "What makes Dirty Harry worth watching, no matter how dumb the story, is Siegel's superb sense of the city, not as a place of moods but as a theater for action."

In The New Yorker, Pauline Kael wrote that Dirty Harry was "a stunningly well-made genre piece", but also "a deeply immoral movie". She said that the film was "not about the actual San Francisco police force; it's about a right-wing fantasy of that police force as a group helplessly emasculated by unrealistic liberals... this action genre has always had a fascist potential, and it has finally surfaced."

Kevin Thomas of the Los Angeles Times called it "a high-style film with lowbrow appeal, a movie after which you may dislike yourself for liking it as much as you do". Stanley Kauffmann of The New Republic described Dirty Harry as "disgusting".

Siegel was largely unbothered by the film's critics, stating:

"I enjoy the controversy, because if you make a film that's safe, you're in trouble. I'm a liberal; I lean to the left. Clint is a conservative; he leans to the right. At no point in making the film did we ever talk politics. I don't make political movies. I was telling the story of a hard‐nosed cop and a dangerous killer. What my liberal friends did not grasp was that the cop is just as evil, in his way, as the sniper."

Eastwood himself denied that the film was right wing, but rather that it "showed the frustration with our courts and our judicial system".

In later years, Dirty Harry has been ranked as one of the best films of 1971. Based mainly on reviews from the 2000s, the film holds an approval rating of 89% on the review aggregate website Rotten Tomatoes from a sample of 53 critics, with an average rating of 7.8/10. The site's critics consensus reads: "As tough and taciturn as its no-nonsense hero, Dirty Harry delivers a deceptively layered message without sacrificing an ounce of its solid action impact." On Metacritic, the film has a weighted average score of 87 out of 100 based on ten critics, indicating "universal acclaim".

In 2014, Time Out polled several film critics, directors, actors and stunt actors to list their top action films. Dirty Harry was listed at 78th place in this list.

John Milius later said he loved the film: "I think it's a great film, one of the few recent great films, more important than The Godfather. It's larger than the sum of its parts; I don't think it's so brilliantly written or so brilliantly acted. Siegel can take more credit than anyone for it."

=== Box office performance ===
The film was the fourth-highest-grossing film of 1971, earning an approximate total of $36 million in its U.S. theatrical release, making it a major financial success in comparison with its modest $4 million budget.

== Legacy ==
Since its release, the film's critical reputation has grown in stature. Dirty Harry was selected in 2008 by Empire as one of The 500 Greatest Movies of All Time. It was placed similarly on The Best 1000 Movies Ever Made list by The New York Times. In January 2010, Total Film included the film on its list of The 100 Greatest Movies of All Time. TV Guide and Vanity Fair also included the film on their lists of the 50 best movies.

Dirty Harry received recognition from the American Film Institute. The film was ranked No. 41 on 100 Years ... 100 Thrills, a list of America's most heart-pounding movies. Harry Callahan was selected as the 17th greatest movie hero on 100 Years ... 100 Heroes & Villains. The movie's famous quote "You've got to ask yourself one question: 'Do I feel lucky?' Well, do ya, punk?" was ranked 51st on 100 Years ... 100 Movie Quotes. Dirty Harry was also on the ballot for several other AFI's 100 series lists including 100 Years ... 100 Movies, 100 Years ... 100 Movies (10th Anniversary Edition), and 100 Years of Film Scores.

== Real-life copycat crime and killers ==
The film allegedly inspired a real-life crime, the Faraday School kidnapping. In October 1972, soon after the release of the movie in Australia, two armed men (one of whom coincidentally had the last name "Eastwood") kidnapped a teacher and six school children in Victoria. They demanded a $1 million ransom. The state government agreed to pay, but the children managed to escape and the kidnappers were subsequently jailed.

Frederick Newhall Woods IV was inspired by the film to plan the 1976 Chowchilla kidnapping, in which a bus with twenty-six schoolchildren and its driver were kidnapped and buried in a van in a rock quarry in Livermore, California. The students and driver escaped before the kidnappers could send their ransom demand.

In September 1981, a case occurred in Germany, under circumstances quite similar to the Barbara Mackle kidnapping: A ten-year-old girl, Ursula Herrmann, was buried alive in a box fitted with ventilation, lighting and sanitary systems to be held for ransom. The girl suffocated in her prison within 48 hours of her abduction because autumn leaves had clogged up the ventilation duct. Twenty-seven years later, a couple were arrested and tried for kidnapping and murder on circumstantial evidence. This case was also dealt with in the German TV series Aktenzeichen XY… ungelöst.

== Influence ==
Harry Callahan pointing his S&W Model 29

Eastwood's iconic portrayal of the blunt, cynical, unorthodox detective, who is seemingly in perpetual trouble with his incompetent bosses, set the style for a number of his later roles and a genre of "loose-cannon" cop films. Author Patrick McGilligan argued that America needed a hero, a winner at a time when the authorities were losing the battle against crime. The box-office success of Dirty Harry led to the production of four sequels.

In the 2007 film Zodiac, also set in San Francisco and inspired by the Zodiac Killer, cartoonist Robert Graysmith approaches police detective Dave Toschi at a movie theater, where he is watching Dirty Harry with his wife. When Graysmith tells Toschi he is going to catch the Zodiac killer, Toschi replies: "Pal? They're already making movies about it."

Dirty Harry helped popularize the Smith & Wesson Model 29 revolver, chambered for the powerful .44 Magnum cartridge, and initiated an increase in sales of the handgun. In 2010, artist James Georgopoulos included the screen-used guns from Dirty Harry in his Guns of Cinema series.

Dirty Harry's famous line "...you've got to ask yourself one question: 'Do I feel lucky?' Well, do you, punk?" is often misquoted and popularly used in a humorous and boastful manner as saying, "Do you feel lucky, punk?"

== See also ==
- List of American films of 1971
- Zodiac Killer in popular culture
- Vigilante film
- Death Wish
- "Dirty Harry" – song by Gorillaz

== Bibliography ==
- Martin, Lonergan (2015). Callahan – A Dirty Harry Story. London: bigfootwriter.com. ISBN 978-1-5369-0394-2.
- Street, Joe, "Dirty Harry's San Francisco", The Sixties: A Journal of History, Politics, and Culture, add ci 5 (June 2012), 1–21.
- Eliot, Marc (2009). American Rebel: The Life of Clint Eastwood. Harmony Books. ISBN 978-0-307-33688-0.
- Hughes, Howard (2009). Aim for the Heart. London: I.B. Tauris. ISBN 978-1-84511-902-7.
- McGilligan, Patrick (1999). Clint: The Life and Legend. London: HarperCollins. ISBN 978-0-00-638354-3.
- Street, Joe (2016). Dirty Harry's America: Clint Eastwood, Harry Callahan, and the Conservative Backlash. University Press of Florida. ISBN 978-0-8130-6167-2.
