= Dirty Harry (character) =

Harry Callahan
- Dirty Harry character
- Clint Eastwood as Harry Callahan in Dirty Harry
- First appearance: Dirty Harry (1971)
- Last appearance: The Dead Pool (1988)
- Created by: Harry Julian Fink; R. M. Fink
- Portrayed by: Clint Eastwood

In-universe information
- Full name: Harold Francis Callahan
- Nickname: Dirty Harry
- Title: Inspector
- Occupation: Police officer U.S. Marine (formerly)
- Spouse: Unnamed woman (deceased)
- Nationality: American
- Born: October 3, 1930

Inspector Harold Francis "Dirty Harry" Callahan is a fictional character and the protagonist of the Dirty Harry film series, which consists of Dirty Harry (1971), Magnum Force (1973), The Enforcer (1976), Sudden Impact (1983), and The Dead Pool (1988). Callahan is portrayed by Clint Eastwood in each film.

From his debut, Callahan became the template for a new kind of film cop: an antihero who does not hesitate to cross professional boundaries in pursuit of his own vision of justice, especially when the law is poorly served by an inept, incompetent bureaucracy.

All of the Dirty Harry films feature Callahan killing criminals, mostly in gunfights. Phrases he utters in armed stand-offs, "Go ahead, make my day" and "[...] you've got to ask yourself one question: 'Do I feel lucky?' Well, do ya, punk?" have become iconic. As the 1971 film was criticized for carrying authoritarian undertones, the sequels attempted to be more balanced by pitting Harry against villains from a broader ideological spectrum, notably in 1973's Magnum Force, in which Harry is shown fighting vigilantism akin to his own after it goes "too far".

== Biography ==
Callahan is an inspector with the San Francisco Police Department, usually with the Homicide Division, although for disciplinary or political reasons he is occasionally transferred to other less prominent units, such as the Personnel Division (in The Enforcer) or Stakeout (in Magnum Force) or just sent out of town on mundane research assignments (in Sudden Impact). Callahan's primary concern is protecting and avenging the victims of violent crime. Though proficient at apprehending criminals, his methods are often unconventional; while some claim that he is prepared to ignore the law and professional and ethical boundaries, regarding them as needless red tape hampering justice, his methods are usually within the law — he takes advantage of situations that justify his use of deadly force.

When a group of men holding hostages in a liquor store in The Enforcer demand a getaway car, Callahan delivers one by driving the car through the store's plate glass window and then shooting the robbers. Rather than following the rules of the police department, Callahan inserts himself into the scene of the event at a time when the imminent use of deadly force by the criminals justifies his use of deadly force against the criminals.

Conversely, in Sudden Impact when he finds out that Jennifer Spencer (Sondra Locke), the person responsible for a series of murders in San Francisco and San Paulo, was a rape victim killing her unpunished rapists, he lets her go free, indicating that he feels her retribution was justified. In The Dead Pool, Callahan shoots a fleeing and unarmed Mafia assassin in the back and kills the villain in the end with a harpoon knowing that the man's pistol is out of ammunition.

Callahan goes a step further in Dirty Harry, in which he shoots serial killer Charles "Scorpio" Davis after Davis surrenders and put his hands in the air. Determined to know the location of a 14-year-old girl that Davis has kidnapped and buried alive, Callahan then presses his foot onto Davis' leg wound, ignoring Davis' pleas for a doctor and a lawyer until Davis gives up the location of the kidnapped girl. Callahan is later informed by the District Attorney that because Callahan kicked in the door of Davis' residence without a warrant, and because Davis' confession of the girl's location was made under the duress of torture, the evidence against him is inadmissible, and Davis has been released without charges filed against him. Callahan explains his outlook to the mayor, who asks how Callahan ascertains that a man he had shot was intending to commit rape; the inspector responds, "When a naked man is chasing a woman through an alley with a butcher knife and a hard-on, I figure he isn't out collecting for the Red Cross."

While his partners and many other officers respect and admire Callahan, others see him as unfit to serve on the police force. He often clashes with superiors who dislike his methods, and judges and prosecutors are wary of handling his cases because of frequent violations of the Fourth Amendment and other irregularities. Callahan for his part believes his superiors have got their priorities in the wrong place, seemingly worried too much about the department's reputation, and not enough about actual security. A police commissioner admits that Callahan's "unconventional methods ... get results", but adds that his successes are "more costly to the city and this department in terms of publicity and physical destruction than most other men's failures". (The publicity makes him well known; in Sudden Impact, the police chief of another city calls him "the famous Harry Callahan", and by The Dead Pool he is so well known that the department wants to transfer him to Public Relations, even while he destroys three police cars in one month and causes a TV station to sue the department.) Callahan is often reprimanded, suspended, and demoted to minor units. At the start of Magnum Force Lt. Briggs transfers him to Stakeout. In The Enforcer, Captain McKay assigns him to Personnel. In Sudden Impact he is threatened with a transfer to Traffic and being fired, in The Enforcer he begins a 180-day suspension imposed by McKay (although it's possible that he got reinstated by the mayor after taking down the terrorists on top of getting a commendation), and in The Dead Pool he is only allowed to stay off desk duty with a new partner. According to film critic Roger Ebert, "it would take an hour in each of these movies to explain why he's not in jail".

The films routinely depict Callahan as being a skilled marksman and strong hand-to-hand combatant, killing at least one man with his bare hands. He is a multiple winner of the SFPD's pistol championship. In the five films, Callahan is shown killing a combined total of 43 criminals, mostly with his trademark revolver, a Smith & Wesson Model 29 .44 Magnum, which he describes as "the most powerful handgun in the world". He refuses to join the secret police death squad in Magnum Force, as he prefers the present system, despite its flaws, to the vigilante alternative. In his fight against criminals, however, including the fellow officers on the death squad, Callahan is relentless and shows no hesitation if he has to use ultimate force.

In Dirty Harry, several explanations are suggested for his nickname. When his partner Chico Gonzalez asks about the nickname's origins, Frank DiGiorgio says, facetiously, that "that's one thing about our Harry; [he] doesn't play any favorites. Harry hates everybody: limeys, micks, hebes, fat dagos, niggers, honkies, chinks - you name it." After being called to talk down a jumper, Callahan claims he is known as "Dirty Harry" because he is assigned to "every dirty job that comes along". When Harry is ordered to deliver ransom money to Scorpio, Gonzalez opines "no wonder they call him Dirty Harry; [he] always gets the shit end of the stick". In Dirty Harry, Gonzalez humorously suggests that Callahan's nickname may have an alternate origin given that he twice ends up peeking through a naked woman's window and later follows a suspect into a strip club.

The films reveal little about Callahan's personal background. In the first film, Callahan tells Chico Gonzalez's wife that his wife was killed by a drunk driver. She appears in Magnum Force in an old photograph which Harry turns around. The doctor tending to him after the first film's bank robbery intimates that "us Potrero Hill boys gotta stick together". The first film's novelization explains that Callahan grew up in this neighborhood and describes a hostile relationship between the police and the residents. Callahan recalls once throwing a brick at a police officer, who picked it up and threw it back. The following sequels show that Harry lives within the city limits in a small studio apartment on Jackson Street in the Nob Hill area, so unfamiliar with his neighbors that they refer to him only as "the cop who lives upstairs". Callahan served in the Marines and is possibly a Korean War veteran. In Magnum Force Harry's friend Charlie McCoy says, "We should have done our 20 in the Marines", indicating that they served (or could/should have served) together in the armed forces. In The Dead Pool, a coffee mug on Harry's desk at the police station bears the United States Marine Corps seal and in The Enforcer it is clear he has already been checked out on the LAWS rocket, a USMC weapon.

His hobbies appear to consist of target shooting and playing pool (seen in The Enforcer). He appears to subsist on a diet of hot dogs, hamburgers and strong black coffee which he takes without sugar and is so unchanging that he simply orders 'the usual' from the staff of his regular eateries (in The Dead Pool he samples his girlfriend's unknown dessert but does not have one himself). He drinks beer, and on one occasion apple juice, and both runs and weightlifts in the gym. In Sudden Impact he acquires a pet bulldog called 'Meathead' but there is no sign of him in The Dead Pool.

Callahan uses different pairs of sunglasses throughout the series. His sunglasses in Magnum Force are the Ray-Ban Balorama. In The Enforcer, he uses Ray-Ban B&L Aviator Style A. In Sudden Impact, he wears Gargoyles ANSI sunglasses.

Harry is a kind-hearted person and he cares about people, especially children. At the end of the first film, the Scorpio killer holds a kid hostage and Harry kills him in self-defense to save the child. In Magnum Force, Harry is seen interacting with the children of his former partner, Charlie McCoy and his wife Carol. He also likes animals as well, such as in Sudden Impact where he's given a Bulldog named Meathead by his partner Horace King.

Not much is known about his views on LGBTQ people, but in Magnum Force, after his partner Early Smith comments that everybody in the police department thought officer John Davis and his friends, who excel in shooting, "were queer for each other", Callahan responds, "Tell you something: if the rest of you could shoot like them, I wouldn't care if the whole damn department was queer.", implying that he's indifferent to the people's sexuality, as long as they perform well their duty.

== Partners ==
When Al Quan becomes Callahan's partner in The Dead Pool, the inspector respects Quan's experience but does not want to work with anyone because, he says, "most of my partners end up in the hospital or dead". He also warns Quan to "get a bulletproof vest", which ends up saving Quan in an explosion.

In the course of the films, most of his partners are killed or wounded while working with him. In Dirty Harry, he mentions two unseen partners named Fanducci and Dietrich, who is in the hospital having been shot, while Fanducci is dead, having been killed in 1968, according to a line in The Enforcer. Callahan's partner in Dirty Harry, Chico Gonzalez, survives being shot by Scorpio and later retires to become a college teacher, as Callahan later mentions in Magnum Force.

His partner in Magnum Force, Earlington "Early" Smith is killed by a bomb planted in his mailbox. In The Enforcer, Kate Moore is killed by terrorists while saving Callahan's life. She had previously mentioned Fanducci and Smith's names to Harry, to demonstrate that she is aware of the risks of being his partner. Of all Callahan's partners seen on screen, Quan and Gonzalez are the only two to survive. Gonzalez saves Callahan's life by shooting at Scorpio right before Scorpio is about to shoot Callahan. Callahan's partner in Sudden Impact, played by Albert Popwell, also played a bank robber in Dirty Harry, a community activist in The Enforcer, and a pimp in Magnum Force.

More than once Callahan resents the partners assigned to him: Gonzalez because he is a rookie college graduate, and Moore because she is a woman lacking field experience. However, they eventually earn his respect and both go on to save Harry's life.

Partner	Film	Portrayed by	Fate
Tom Fanducci	Unseen	Unknown	Killed.
Fred Dietrich	Unseen	Unknown	Wounded.
Frank DiGiorgio	Dirty Harry, Magnum Force, and The Enforcer	John Mitchum	Stabbed in the back; died in hospital. (Though the 1981 original novel Duel For Cannons states DiGiorgio survived the attack.)
Chico Gonzalez	Dirty Harry	Reni Santoni	Wounded; shot by Scorpio and later resigned.
Earlington "Early" Smith	Magnum Force	Felton Perry	Killed; blown up by a bomb in his mailbox.
Kate Moore	The Enforcer	Tyne Daly	Killed; shot with an M16.
Horace King	Sudden Impact	Albert Popwell	Killed; throat slit by Mick and his gang.
Al Quan	The Dead Pool	Evan C. Kim	Wounded; survived a car explosion.

== Relationships ==
In Dirty Harry, it is established that Callahan's unnamed wife, whose portrait is on display in his apartment, has recently died. In Magnum Force, he begins a relationship with Sunny, an Asian neighbor who seeks to sleep with him on their first meeting. In Sudden Impact, he establishes a sexual relationship with vigilante Jennifer Spencer. In The Dead Pool, he implies a romantic relationship with news reporter Samantha Walker, and the film ends with her and Callahan walking away together.

== Cultural recognition ==
Callahan is considered a film icon, so much so that his nickname, "Dirty Harry", has entered the lexicon as slang for ruthless police officers. Harry Callahan was voted number 23 by Empire Magazine on their list of The 100 Greatest Movie Characters. Callahan was voted the 17th greatest movie hero on 100 Years... 100 Heroes and Villains. He was also named one of The 20 All Time Coolest Heroes in Pop Culture by Entertainment Weekly. He was also ranked 42nd by Premiere magazine on their list of the 100 Greatest Movie Characters of All Time. The character also received recognition from the American Film Institute. Callahan's trademark weapon, the Smith & Wesson Model 29 .44 Magnum revolver, was named the second greatest movie weapon of all time, behind the lightsaber from Star Wars.

On AFI's 100 Years...100 Movie Quotes, two of Dirty Harry's famous lines ranked 6th and 51st, respectively:

1. "Go ahead, make my day"

2."I know what you're thinking: 'Did he fire six shots or only five?' Well, to tell you the truth, in all this excitement I've kinda lost track myself. But being as this is a .44 Magnum, the most powerful handgun in the world, and would blow your head clean off, you've got to ask yourself one question: 'Do I feel lucky?' Well, do you, punk?"

The former phrase was borrowed by US President Ronald Reagan in a March 1985 speech to the American Business Conference. Promising to veto any proposed tax rises, he challenged those who wanted them to: "Go ahead, make my day." It has also given its name to a law in Colorado, the Make My Day Law, which protects homeowners who use lethal force against intruders.

== See also ==
- Dirty Harry (film series)
- Dirty Harry (1990 video game)
