= Sondra Locke =

American actress (1944–2018)

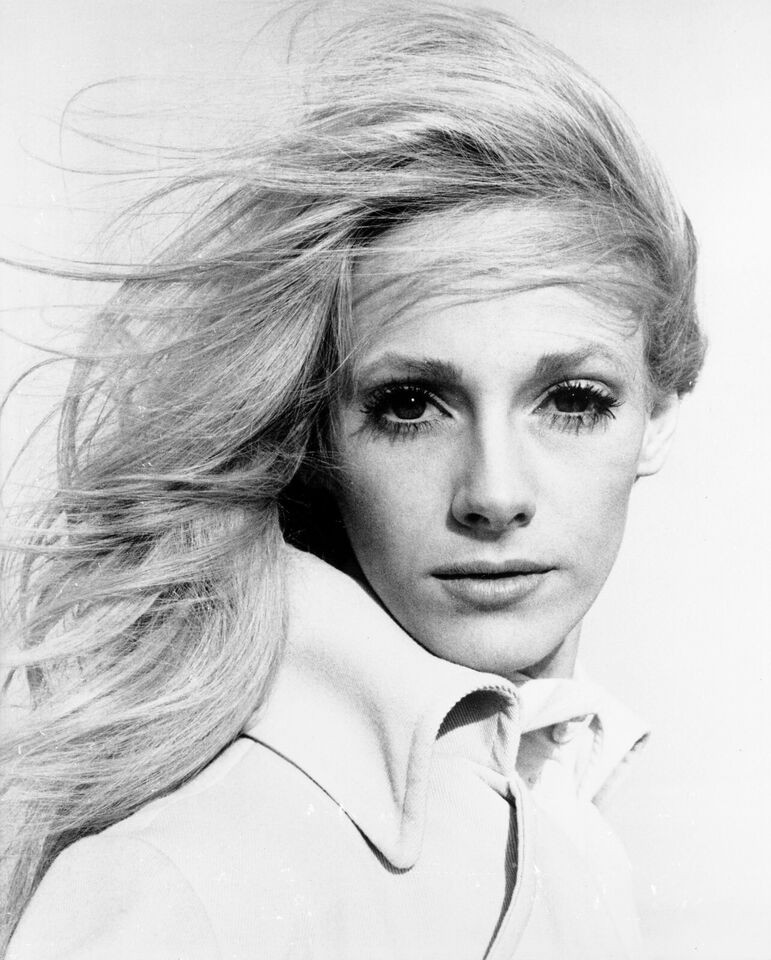
- Locke in 1969
- Born: Sandra Louise Smith; May 28, 1944; Shelbyville, Tennessee, U.S.
- Died: November 3, 2018 (aged 74); Los Angeles, California, U.S.
- Other names: Sandra Elkins; Sandra Locke; Sondra Anderson
- Education: Middle Tennessee State University
- Occupations: Actress; director
- Years active: 1962–1999; 2016
- Spouse: Gordon Anderson (m. 1967)
- Partner(s): Clint Eastwood (1975–1989); Scott Cunneen (1990–2001)

Signature
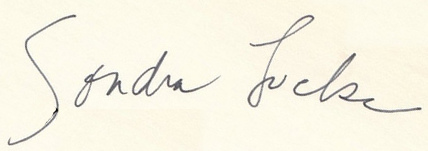

Sandra Louise Anderson (née Smith; May 28, 1944 – November 3, 2018), professionally known as Sondra Locke, was an American actress and director.

An alumna of Middle Tennessee State University, Locke broke into regional show business with assorted posts at the Nashville-based radio station WSM-AM, then segued into television as a promotions assistant for WSM-TV. She performed in the theater company Circle Players Inc. while employed at WSM. After making her screen debut in a locally shot short subject in 1966, she transitioned to feature films in The Heart Is a Lonely Hunter (1968), for which she was nominated for an Academy Award for Best Supporting Actress and earned dual Golden Globe nominations for Best Supporting Actress and New Star of the Year.

Locke went on to appear in the box-office successes Willard (1971), The Outlaw Josey Wales (1976), The Gauntlet (1977), Every Which Way but Loose (1978), Bronco Billy (1980), Any Which Way You Can (1980), and Sudden Impact (1983). She worked regularly with Clint Eastwood, who was her companion from 1975 to 1989 despite their marriages to other people. She also starred in Cover Me Babe (1970), A Reflection of Fear (1972), The Second Coming of Suzanne (1974), The Shadow of Chikara (1977), and Ratboy (1986). Her television credits include guest roles on such hit series as Night Gallery (1971), The F.B.I. (1972), Cannon (1973–1975), Kung Fu (1974), and Barnaby Jones (1975). She directed four films, notably Impulse (1990), and authored an autobiography in 1997. Her final film was Ray Meets Helen (2018).

Locke's persona belied her age. She claimed to have been born several years later than 1944, often playing roles written for women far younger than herself, and kept her true age a secret throughout her career. For reasons never made clear, her death was not publicly announced and was only confirmed by vital statistics six weeks after she died of cardiac arrest at the age of 74. From 1967 until her death, Locke was the wife of sculptor Gordon Leigh Anderson, in a mixed-orientation union they reputedly never consummated.

== Background, early life and education ==
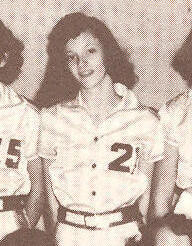
A brunette Locke on the 1956 S.M.S. basketball team

Sandra Louise Smith was born on May 28, 1944, (Note: Various dates were given by the press for Locke's birth. Contradictory sources have either directly cited, or implied, 1940 and every year from 1943 to 1950, with some of the more brazen PR gimmicks even purporting it to be as late as 1952 or 1956. Her most commonly reported year of birth was 1947; Locke's publicist gave that year on several occasions when asked to clarify the inconsistency. However, Locke's marriage license, death certificate, yearbooks, and her entry on public records indexes FamilySearch and Intelius establish the year as 1944.) (Note: Sources are divided as to whether she was born in Alabama or Tennessee. Locke said the latter. While not dispositive, the 1950 census, which misspells the family name as Lacke, upholds this.) the daughter of New York City native Raymond Smith, then a soldier stationed at Camp Forrest, (Note: Smith may have died before Locke learned of him. The actress wrote in her autobiography that she found out he was her father "sometime during grammar school," but phrased all references to him in ambiguous past tense and evaded specifying years.) and Pauline Bayne, a pencil factory worker from Huntsville, Alabama, who was of mostly Scottish descent, with matrilineages in South Carolina extending back to the late 18th century. (Note: Bayne's surname was also given as Bane, Bain, Baine, or Baines. According to census documents, Locke's maternal grandfather could neither read nor write, hence the variant spellings/versions.) Locke's parents separated before her birth. In her autobiography, Locke noted, "although Momma would not admit it, I knew Mr. Smith never married my mother." She had a maternal half-brother, Donald (born April 26, 1946), from Bayne's subsequent brief marriage to William B. Elkins. (Note: Bayne was also wed to painter Thomas H. Nelson between marriages to William Elkins and Alfred Locke, for less than eight months.) When Bayne married Alfred Locke in 1948, Sandra and Donald assumed his surname. (Note: In 1945, Locke briefly took the surname of her then-stepfather, Elkins, before her mother changed it again in 1948. Her legal name was changed four times during her first 24 years of life: from Sandra Smith to Sandra Elkins, to Sandra Locke, to Sondra Locke, to Sondra Anderson.) She grew up in Shelbyville, Tennessee, where her stepfather owned a construction company. The family later moved to nearby Wartrace. Self-described as introspective and ambitious, Locke started working part time at age 16, drove her own car, and had a phone installed in her bedroom. She was raised a Baptist, but stopped going to church as an adult.

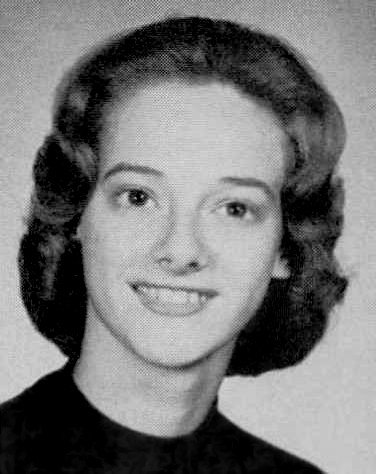
Locke's yearbook photo, 1960

Locke was a cheerleader and class valedictorian in junior high, as well as editor-in-chief of The Royal yearbook and a star player on the girls' basketball team. From 1958, she attended Shelbyville Central High School, where she again served as valedictorian and was voted "Duchess of Studiousness" by classmates. She continued to play basketball at SCHS, served as parent–teacher–student association representative, and was president of the French club. Regardless, she was not considered "date material" by the more socially prominent boys in her class. Locke's first beau, according to locals' reminiscences, was Fred Thomas Jones, a carpenter's son. Her graduation yearbook listed her grade average 97.72% and her ambition "always to take disappointments with a smile." In 1962, Locke matriculated at Middle Tennessee State University (then Middle Tennessee State College) in Murfreesboro on a full scholarship. Majoring in theatre, she was a member of the Alpha Psi Omega honor society while at MTSU, and appeared on stage in Life with Father and The Crucible. She dropped out after completing two semesters of study.

In or around 1963, Locke essentially broke off contact with her family, concluding: "It made no sense for any of us to spend our lives pretending to have relationships that did not really exist." She never knew her biological father, and did not attend the funerals of her mother or stepfather, nor did she have anything to do with her brother, sister-in-law and three nieces. (Note: Notwithstanding their ongoing estrangement, Bayne vocally supported her daughter during the litigious war between Locke and Clint Eastwood. She told journalist Leon Wagener: "One of those children Clint made her abort could have been the grandson I've always longed for.") Donald blamed Gordon Anderson—Locke's best friend since adolescence and future husband—for the rift, claiming Anderson had "an almost hypnotic spell on her." (Note: Hostility between the in-laws appears to be permanent. Seven years after his half-sister's death, Don Locke lambasted Gordon Anderson on the internet, calling him "a weirdo in every sense of the word.")

Locke held a variety of jobs, including as a bookkeeper for Tyson Foods and receptionist in a real-estate office. For a time, she lived at South Water Apartments in the commuter town of Gallatin. In 1964, she joined the staff at radio station WSM-AM 650 in Nashville, and was promoted to its television affiliate WSM-Channel 4 the following year. Locke's biggest coup while employed there was hosting actor Robert Loggia when he visited Nashville to promote his TV pilot T.H.E. Cat, during which he "flirted outrageously" with Locke. She also modeled for The Tennessean fashion page, acted in commercials for Rich-Schwartz ladies apparel and Southerland Gel mattresses, among others, and gained further stage experience in productions for Circle Players Inc. In 1966, the 22-year-old appeared in a UPI wire photo that showed her cavorting in new fallen snow. Within one year of this exposure, she decided to pursue a career in film, and changed the spelling of her first name to avoid being called Sandy.

== Career ==
=== Beginnings ===
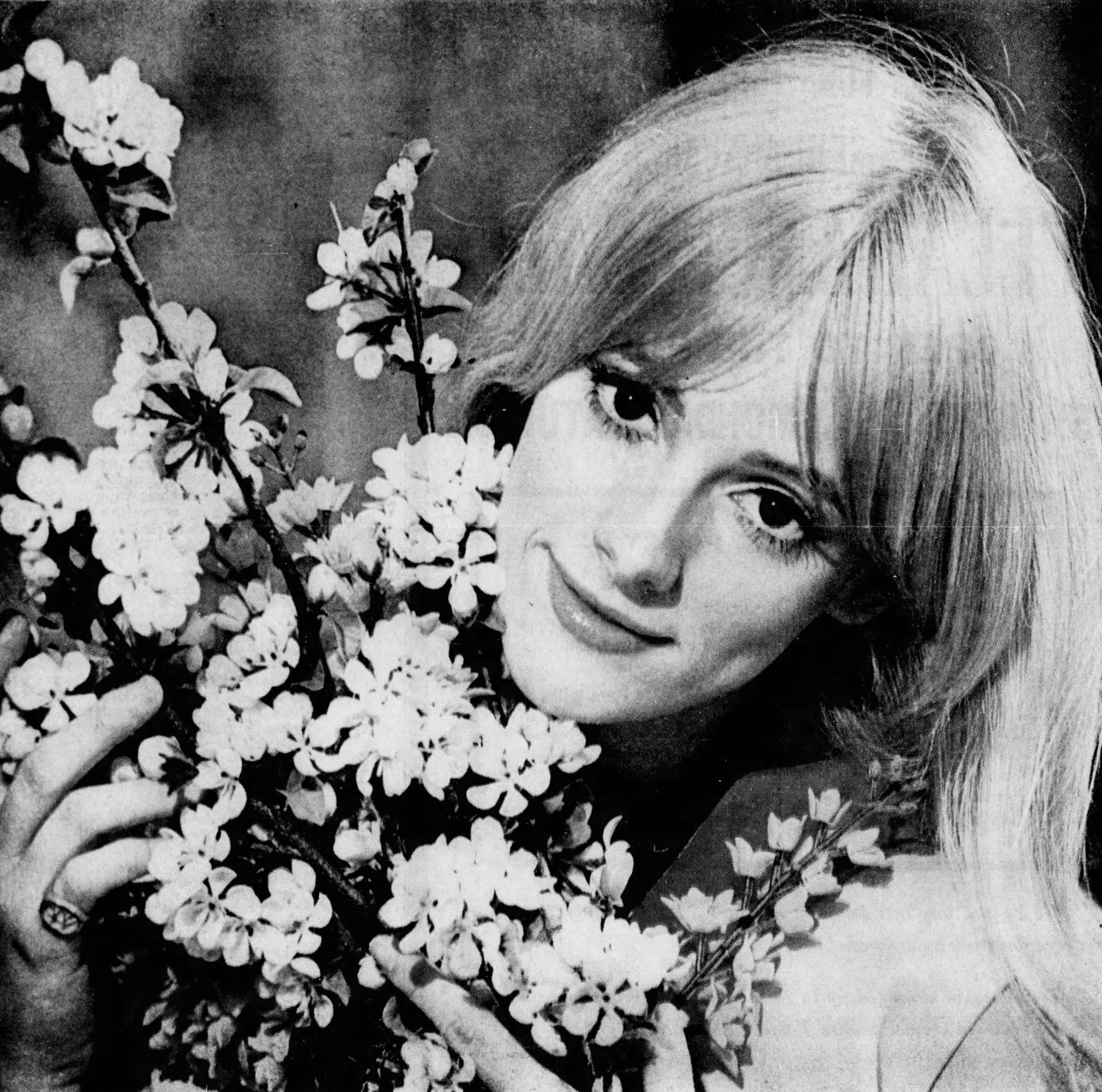
From the front cover of The Nashville Tennessean Sunday Magazine, 1967

While still living in Nashville—and billed under her pre-fame name, Sandra Locke—she acted in a half-hour training film about marriage titled For Better, For Worse (1966), written and directed by Edwin Hughes and distributed by the Methodist Television Radio and Film Commission (TRAFCO). Once Locke gained mainstream recognition, however, For Better, For Worse would be redacted from all of her publicity material in order to foster the illusion that she was a complete novice. In the only contemporaneous article to address Locke's discrepancies, The Tennessean's Clara Hieronymus lamented the actress' "fondness for exaggeration and distortion of the facts. She doesn't need that." This approach set the tone for Locke's career, as subterfuge became something of a trademark for her.

=== Rise to prominence ===
In July 1967, Locke competed with 590 other Southern actresses and dozens of New York hopefuls for the part of Mick Kelly in a big-screen adaptation of Carson McCullers' novel The Heart Is a Lonely Hunter opposite Alan Arkin. (Note: After-the-fact publicity claimed 2,000 actresses tried out for the role.) For the first audition in Birmingham, Alabama, then-fiancé Gordon Anderson gave his bride a so-called Hollywood makeover: he bound her bosom, bleached her eyebrows, and carefully fixed her hair, makeup, and outfit so as to create a more gamine appearance. Locke lied about her age, shaving off six years to make herself seem younger—a pretense she would keep up not only for the rest of her career, but also the entirety of her public life. (Note: Bonnie Bedelia told the 8 October 1967 Los Angeles Times that "they decided I was too old" when she auditioned for the same role as Locke. As it turns out, Bedelia was four years younger than Locke, who had lied about her age. Wayne Smith, a University of Alabama student five years Locke's junior, played her love interest in the movie, though his character is described as being a couple of years older than she.) (Note: In the 1960s, Town & Country magazine and The Nashville Tennessean outed Locke for lying about her age, but the mass media took decades to catch on, and most publications continued to use the incorrect birth year(s). Locke admitted in The Good, the Bad, and the Very Ugly that she lied about her age early in her career, but claimed to have knocked only three years off, rather than six. In one of her final interviews, conducted in 2015 for The Projection Booth podcast, Locke lied that she "was just graduating high school" when she made The Heart Is a Lonely Hunter, when she was in fact in her mid-20s. Moreover, an international press release from 1967 omits Locke's time at MTSU, as well as her residence in Nashville, where she had moved in 1963 after dropping out of college.) After callbacks in New Orleans and Manhattan, she was cast in the role by recommendation from entertainment coordinator Marion Dougherty. The film's shooting wrapped in the fall of 1967. Locke, who had quit her post at WSM, opted to wait until its release before choosing a follow-up project. In the nine-month interim, she was asked to play the female protagonists in True Grit and Michelangelo Antonioni's Zabriskie Point. She said she turned down the former on the grounds that it was too similar to the role she had just done, and the latter because of the nudity required.

By 1968, advertising for Heart was prolific; the film came out that summer to critical acclaim but only modest grosses. Locke's performance garnered her an Academy Award nomination, as well as a pair of Golden Globe nominations for Best Supporting Actress and Most Promising Newcomer – Female. (Note: Though Locke played the leading female role, during awards season, Warner Bros.-Seven Arts campaigned for Best Supporting Actress instead of Best Actress, seemingly to make winning easier. She lost to Ruth Gordon for Rosemary's Baby. Ruth Gordon later appeared with Locke in Every Which Way but Loose and Any Which Way You Can.) Being the oldest nominee in the latter category, she concealed this distinction through retconning with aid from studio publicists. At a film exhibitor convention in Kansas City, she won the Show-A-Rama Award from the Motion Picture Association of America as "Most Promising New Star of the Year". (Note: Locke's plaque was stolen at Kansas City International Airport.) Although her salary for the film was reported as $15,000 in contemporary articles, Locke later claimed it was less than one-third that amount.

=== Commercial ups and downs, missed roles, TV work ===
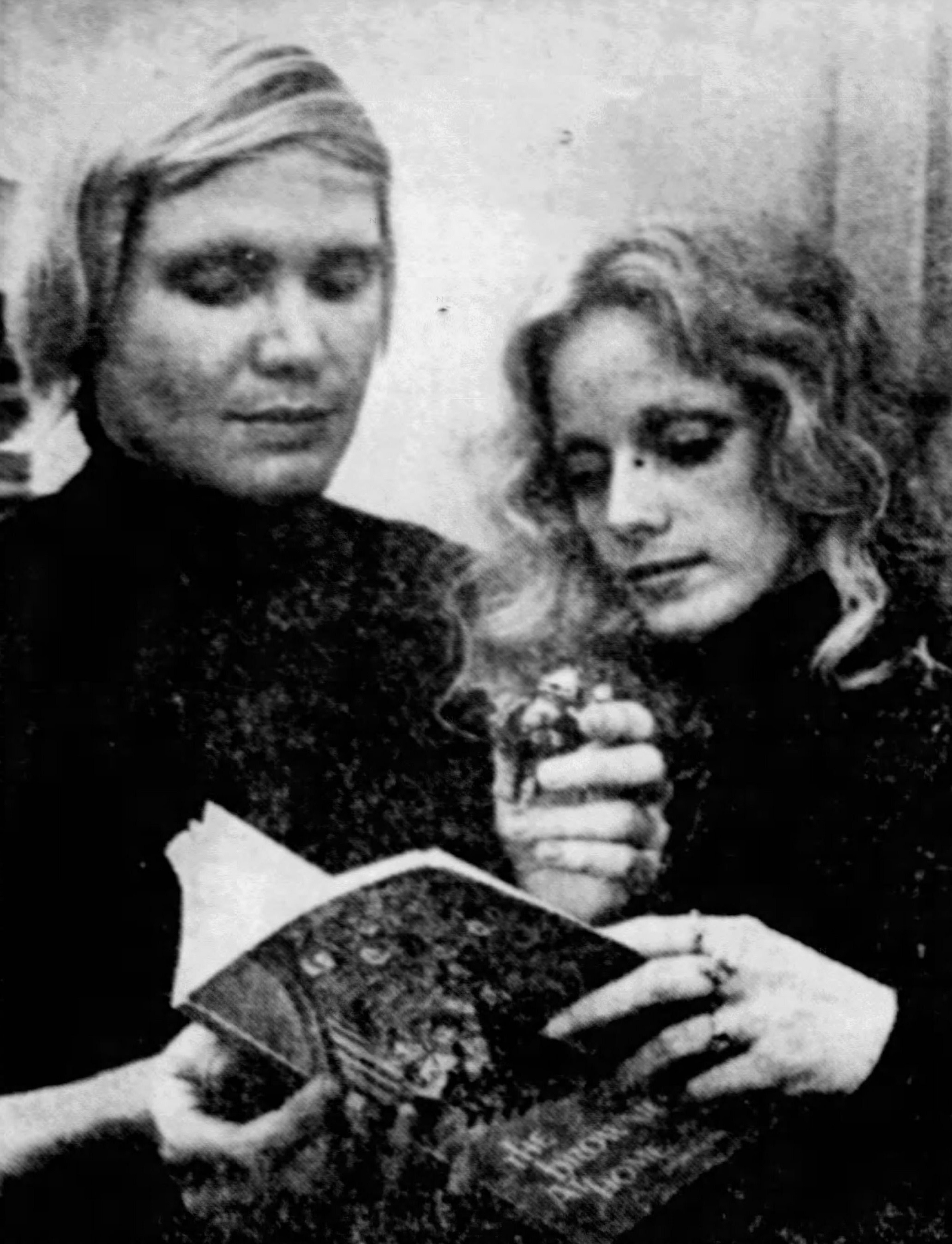
The Andersons holding a copy of Palmer Cox's book The Brownies at Home, 1971

Hoping to shed the plain image she had accentuated in The Heart Is a Lonely Hunter, in January 1969 Locke posed for a seminude Lady Godiva-ish pictorial by photographer Frank Bez, which was published in the December issue of Playboy. The Playboy layout established Locke's status as a sex symbol, and the images were recycled in other men's magazines as her fame increased. Nearly three decades later, Locke said she still got those photos in fan mail requesting her autograph.

Her next role was as Melisse in Cover Me Babe (1970), originally titled Run Shadow Run, opposite Robert Forster. She made it as part of a $150,000 three-picture deal with 20th Century Fox, and was compensated for the other two, which never materialized. It was announced that she would play the lead in Lovemakers—a film adaptation of Robert Nathan's novel The Color of Evening—but no movie resulted. Locke was offered Barbara Hershey's role in Last Summer (1969), but her management turned it down without telling her. Shortly afterwards, she passed on the lead in My Sweet Charlie (1970), which won an Emmy for its eventual star Patty Duke. She also declined the part of Bruce Dern's pregnant wife in They Shoot Horses, Don't They? (1969). Projects Locke actively pursued but got rejected for included The Sterile Cuckoo (1969) and Tell Me That You Love Me, Junie Moon (1970), with directors Alan J. Pakula and Otto Preminger both choosing Liza Minnelli instead.

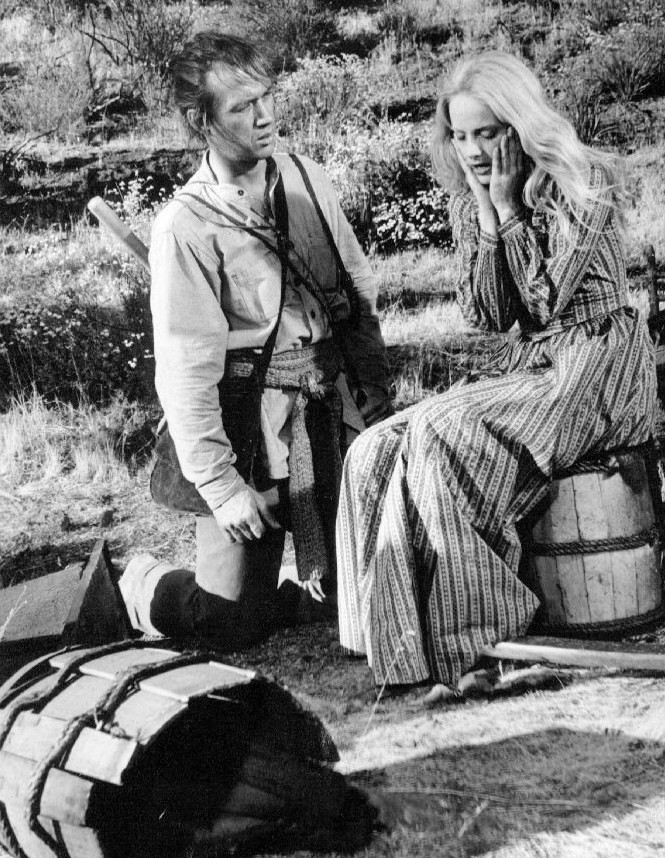
With David Carradine in Kung Fu, 1974

In 1971, Locke co-starred with Bruce Davison and Ernest Borgnine in the psychological thriller Willard, which became a surprise box-office smash. Locke felt overqualified for her role but did it as a favor to Davison, who at the time was her unofficial paramour.

She was then featured in William A. Fraker's underseen mystery A Reflection of Fear (1972), which required her to project the image of a character half her age, and held the title role in first-time director Michael Barry's avant garde drama The Second Coming of Suzanne (1974), winner of three gold medals at the Atlanta Film Festival. Both films were shelved for two years before finally opening in arthouse cinemas, attracting little attention at first. Over time, Suzanne has accrued a cult following, while Reflection is cited as an early example of media portrayals of transgender people. (Note: A Reflection of Fear was not the first time Locke was considered to play a transsexual. In 1969, Christine Jorgensen, the trans woman famous for having sex-reassignment surgery in Denmark in 1953, mentioned Locke and Mia Farrow as contenders for a planned film version of her life. A fan of Locke's performance in The Heart Is a Lonely Hunter, Jorgensen observed, "in scenes where she didn't wear any makeup, Sondra looks very much like I did in my younger days. I think she might make an excellent choice.")

In 1973, Locke was attached to star in Terminal Circle. "It's a woman's role that comes along once in a lifetime," she said. The San Francisco-based film was to be directed by Mal Karman and shot by cinematographer Robert Primes, who did camerawork for Gimme Shelter, but it was scrapped for lack of funds. Plans emerged for Locke to star in the Civil War extravaganza John Brown's Body, based on the epic poem by Stephen Vincent Benét, with Pandro S. Berman producing. It too failed to move into production. She was up for a big part in Earthquake (1974) but lost out to Geneviève Bujold.

Locke guest starred on top-rated television drama series throughout the first half of the 1970s, including The F.B.I., Cannon (as two different characters), Barnaby Jones, and Kung Fu. She was advised by her agents to stay away from TV, but she thought it foolish to sit around not working between films. In the 1972 Night Gallery episode "A Feast of Blood", she played the victim of a curse, planted by Norman Lloyd, receiving a brooch that devoured her. Lloyd acted with Locke again in Gondola (1973), a racially themed, three-character PBS teleplay co-starring her real-life significant other at the time, Bo Hopkins, and Lloyd commended the actress for "a beautiful performance – perhaps her best ever." Ron Harper, who worked with Locke on the short-lived 1974 show Planet of the Apes, was even more effusive: "After acting with her in a couple of scenes, there was something so feminine about her that I could picture myself easily falling for her ... She's one of those women who exudes femininity, and you just become so attracted to that."

=== Films with Clint Eastwood ===
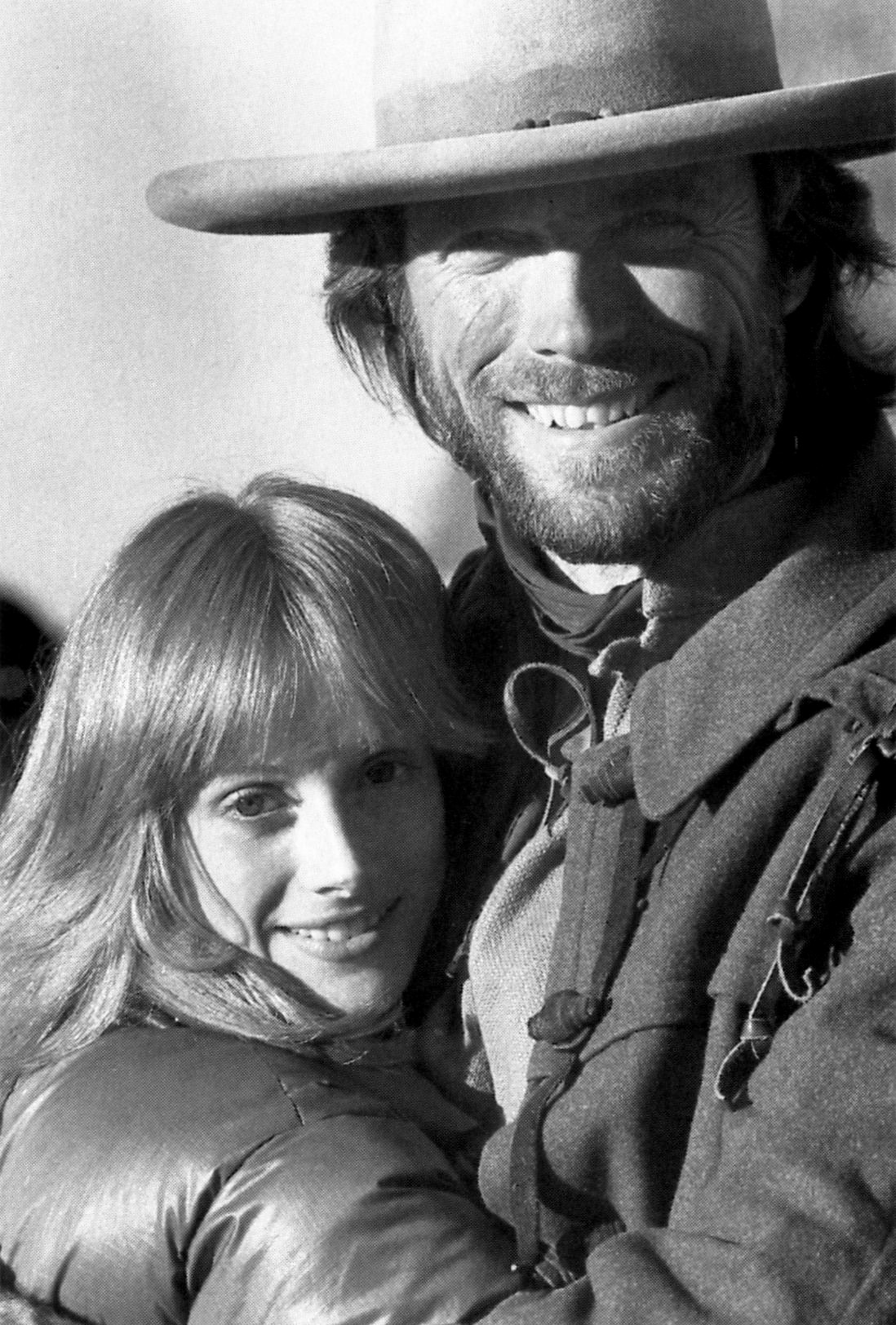
Locke and Eastwood in 1975 during the filming of The Outlaw Josey Wales

In mid-1975, Locke was cast in The Outlaw Josey Wales as the love interest of Clint Eastwood's eponymous character. Locke said she chose the role for its exposure, following a run of unremarkable credits. She took a pay cut just to be in the film; her salary for Josey Wales was $18,000—less than half of what she had earned for her previous job. The film emerged as one of the top 15 grossing films of 1976 and revived Locke's career. She followed it up with a lead role alongside Eastwood in the popular action road film The Gauntlet (1977), the duo replacing Steve McQueen and Barbra Streisand, who bowed out from the production reportedly due to a clash of egos. Its pre-publicity touted Locke as "the first actress ever to be in a Clint Eastwood movie and get equal billing on screen with the macho star." Eastwood predicted that she would win an Oscar for her performance. Locke was not even nominated and received mixed critical response at best: on the upside, Vincent Canby of The New York Times said, "Locke is not only pretty, but also occasionally genuinely funny" and Los Angeles Times critic Kevin Thomas stated that Locke "has not received such a rich opportunity since her Academy Award-nominated debut"; in contrast, Gene Siskel of the Chicago Tribune said, "she's wasted here" and TV Guide felt that "Locke is simply repulsive."

Over the course of their decade-and-a-half-long personal relationship, Locke did not work in any capacity on any theatrical motion picture other than with Eastwood except for 1977's experimental horror Western The Shadow of Chikara. Co-starring Joe Don Baker, The Shadow of Chikara is noted for being the first film to be shot on the Buffalo National River. Eastwood accompanied Locke on the shoot and spent his days touring the countryside and fishing while she filmed. The home-invasion potboiler Death Game (1977), though released after they became an item, was actually shot in 1974. "Clint wanted me to work only with him," Locke said. "He didn't like the idea of me being away from him."

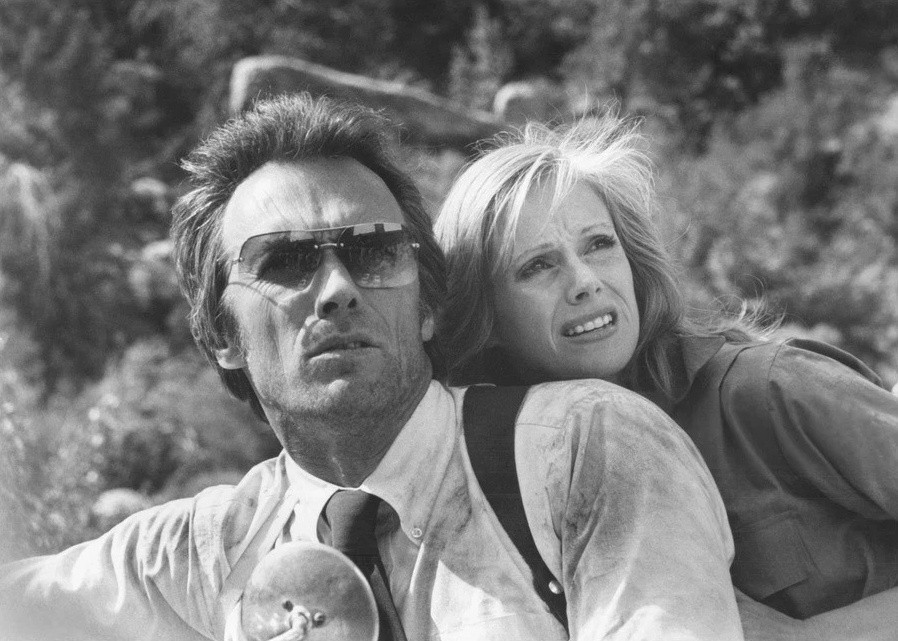
Eastwood and Locke in The Gauntlet (1977)

In 1978, Locke and Eastwood appeared with an orangutan named Manis in that year's fourth-highest grossing film, Every Which Way but Loose. She portrayed country singer Lynn Halsey-Taylor in the adventure-comedy. Its 1980 sequel Any Which Way You Can—for which Locke earned a six-figure salary plus a share of the profits—was nearly as successful. Locke recorded several songs for the soundtracks of these films, and was whispered to be shopping for a record deal at the time. On the coattails of the franchise's success, she performed live in concert (one-off gigs) with The Everly Brothers, Eddie Rabbitt, and Tom Jones.

During this period, Eastwood did a few movies that had no prominent female character for Locke to play. In the meantime, she accepted some television offers, co-starring with an all-female ensemble cast in Friendships, Secrets and Lies (1979) and portraying big band-era vocalist Rosemary Clooney in Rosie: The Rosemary Clooney Story (1982). While the biopic followed Clooney from age 17 to 40, Locke was 38 when she played the role, and—though hardly counting as a proper exception due to its nonlinear structure—this marked the only time she played a mother onscreen. As part of the promotional push behind Rosie, Variety's Rick Du Brow wrote a flattering article in which he called Locke "one of the most-watched and popular motion picture actresses in the world."

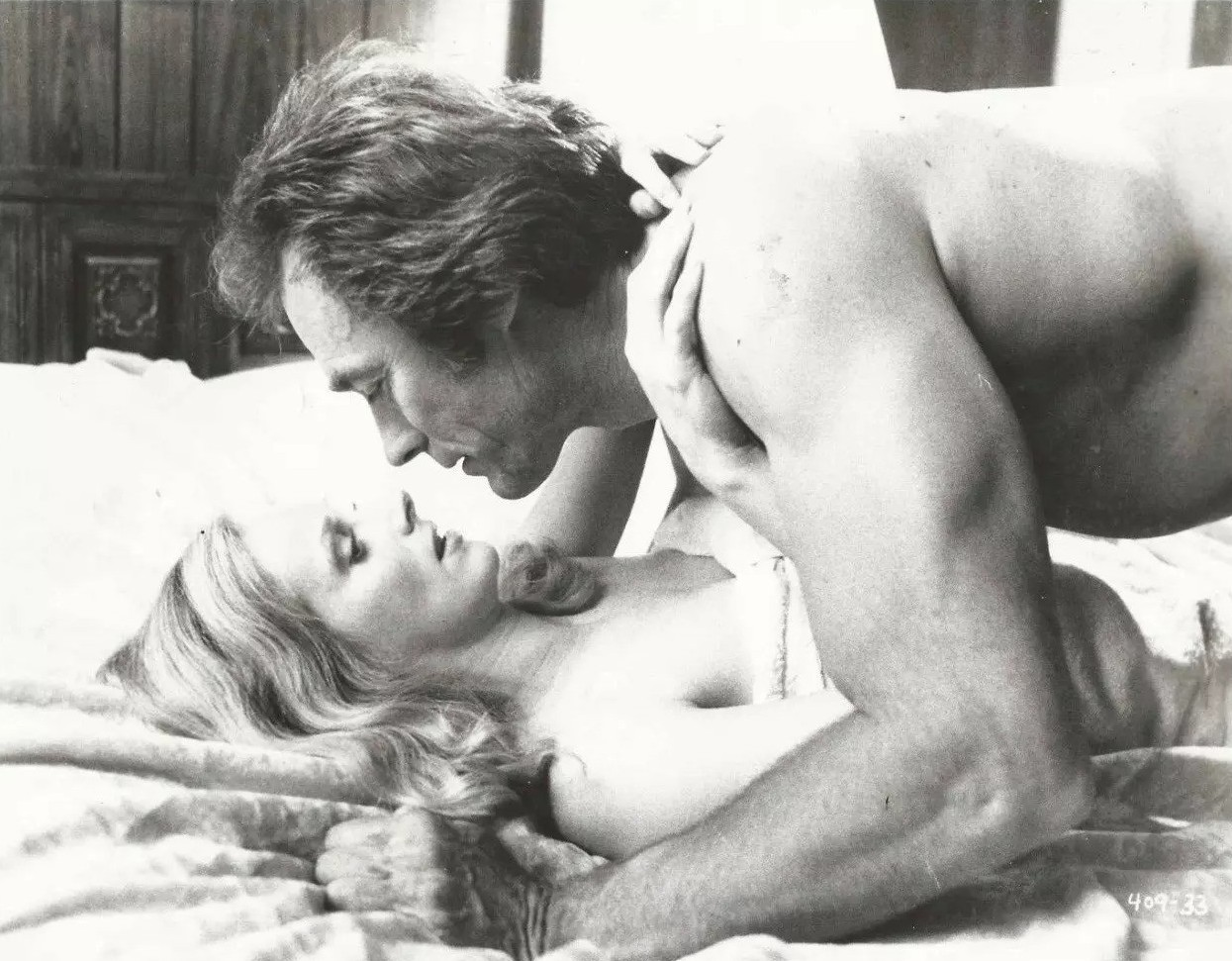
In Any Which Way You Can (1980)

Locke starred as a bitter heiress who joins a traveling Wild West show in Bronco Billy (1980), her only film with Eastwood not to reach blockbuster status, though it still ranked among the annual box-office top 25. The New York Times critic Janet Maslin noticed that "each of them works more delicately here than they have together previously," and the film's director of photography, David Worth, enthused how "being able to capture the true love between Clint and Sondra was very special." Locke cited Bronco Billy and The Outlaw Josey Wales as her favorites of the movies they made. The couple's final collaboration as performers was Sudden Impact (1983), the highest-grossing film in the Dirty Harry franchise, in which Locke played an artist with her own code of vigilante justice. Her fee was a reported $350,000.

Locke never appeared in a wide release after Sudden Impact. The film premiered five months short of her 40th birthday, declared by People as "the pre-Fonda age cutoff for actresses." Despite Locke's past nomination for an Academy Award and repeat appearances in box-office hits, she had failed to achieve first-magnitude stardom or win the affection of the moviegoing public. By 1979, the year Eastwood and she made their fourth film together, accusations of nepotism arose. Cultural critic Joe Queenan, writing for Mail & Guardian, would express particular contempt for her in a 2010 editorial about Eastwood's career, believing that "his worst movies, without question, are the ones he made with Sondra Locke." In late 1983, Locke announced plans to develop and star in a movie about Marie Antoinette, but the project fell apart. Eastwood then directed Locke in a 1985 Amazing Stories episode titled "Vanessa in the Garden", with Harvey Keitel.

=== Directing ===
Locke made her feature directorial debut with Ratboy (1986), a parable about a youth who is part rat and part human, produced by Eastwood's company Malpaso. When asked why she had been absent from her longtime beau's recent star vehicles, Locke replied simply, "I wasn't right for the roles." (Note: Locke's autobiography provides a convoluted recollection of the casting process for City Heat (1984). Blake Edwards was originally slated to direct the film, and Edwards supposedly promised Locke one of the two female leads at a stage in development when Burt Reynolds had signed on, but the role of the other leading man was yet to be filled. Locke asserted that Edwards was merely using her to lure in her superstar boyfriend—who had seen the script and turned it down—because once Eastwood came on board, Edwards stopped talking to Locke and cast Madeleine Kahn in the role she had been eyeing. Edwards ultimately withdrew and was replaced by Richard Benjamin. Nevertheless, Eastwood disappointed Locke by not using his clout to get her in the movie.) Ratboy had very limited distribution in the United States, where it was a critical and financial flop, but the film was well received in Europe, with French newspaper Le Parisien calling it the highlight of the Deauville Film Festival. Locke, who also appeared in the lead role alongside Sharon Baird as the title character, was nominated for a Golden Raspberry Award for Worst Actress. Amidst this setback, Locke conceded that plum acting offers had dried up, though she never backed down from the ruse she had begun in 1967, masquerading ceaselessly about being younger.

Locke's second foray behind the camera was Impulse (1990), starring Theresa Russell as a police officer on the vice squad who goes undercover as a prostitute. Siskel & Ebert gave the film "two thumbs up". In a subsequent interview with Siskel, Locke said she was not eager to act again. "If you love the craft of filmmaking as much as I do, it's hard to go back to acting after you've tasted the high of directing."

Immediately following the completion of Impulse, two of its co-stars, Jeff Fahey and George Dzundza, were hired by Locke's now ex-boyfriend Eastwood to appear in White Hunter Black Heart, a move that raised eyebrows among the film community.

It's true: I went from a picture with Sondra to one with Clint. A lot of people ask about that ... I go out of my way not to be involved in other people's situations. Clint and Sondra were very professional. No one ever put me in the middle of anything. All I can say is that they are two very individual, professional filmmakers.

— Jeff Fahey

After a long interruption in her career due to legal difficulties and health issues, Locke directed the made-for-television film Death in Small Doses (1995), based on a true story, and the independent feature Trading Favors (1997), starring Rosanna Arquette.

=== Memoir and final projects ===
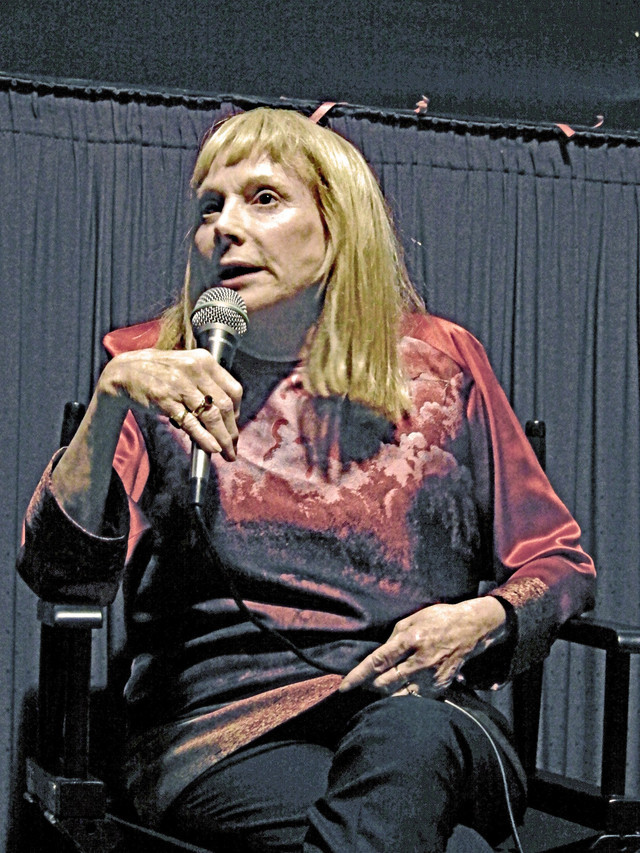
Locke at a screening of Ray Meets Helen in 2018, her last public appearance (Note: Locke started wearing hair pieces in 1977.)

In 1997, Locke's autobiography The Good, the Bad, and the Very Ugly: A Hollywood Journey was published by William Morrow and Company. In it, she called Eastwood "a completely evil, manipulating, lying excuse for a man." Eastwood's lawyers sent a warning letter to the publisher, and although no slander charges arose, Entertainment Tonight canceled a scheduled interview with Locke. She was also bumped from The Oprah Winfrey Show, and in her words, "shut out of most venues to promote the book, in particular the networks." The book received a supportive rave review from New York Daily News writer Liz Smith, while Entertainment Weekly's Dana Kennedy dismissed the book as a "peculiar, not terribly consequential, life story."

Locke told a Portuguese website that she had been informed that Entertainment Weekly originally planned to publish a positive review, but for reasons unclear, it was pulled and a negative review appeared instead. The Advocate, a monthly LGBT-interest magazine, was set to do a big article on Locke's book; suddenly and uncharacteristically, Eastwood gave The Advocate an interview, and they decided not to run the piece. She reflected in 2012: "Clint has said so many bad things about me to the media since we split up, and he has so much more access and power to do that. He's said things that were hurtful to my character and hurtful to me professionally." Locke was nonetheless grateful to have a platform at all, stating: "It was a miracle that a major publisher took it."

The day after the book's release, Eastwood on Eastwood, a feature-length overview of her ex's career directed by Richard Schickel, premiered on TNT. John Hartl of The Seattle Times emphasized that "clips from the Locke/Eastwood movies have been edited so carefully that she doesn't appear to have been in any of them. It's like making a documentary about Humphrey Bogart and failing to mention Lauren Bacall." Locke would once again be notably deleted from a montage commemorating Eastwood at the 2002 Maui Film Festival.

After 13 years away from acting, Locke re-emerged in 1999 to appear opposite Dennis Hopper in The Prophet's Game and Wings Hauser in Clean and Narrow, the latter shot in Texas. Both films went straight to video. About that time, she planned to direct "a two-guys-on-the-run film" called The Hard Easy, which did not eventuate. Caritas Films, the production company that Locke had formed with husband Gordon Anderson—whom she wed in 1967 and never legally split from—shut down in 2004 after failing to get any projects off the ground.

In 2014, Locke served as an executive producer on the Eli Roth film Knock Knock, starring Keanu Reeves. She came out of retirement once more in 2016, producing and starring in Alan Rudolph's indie Ray Meets Helen with Keith Carradine. The film had only a brief run in three theaters in May 2018, less than six months before Locke died. Despite increasing infirmities, she traveled to Ann Arbor, Michigan, a few days after her 74th birthday to attend the Cinetopia Film Festival, where Ray Meets Helen was received poorly. Writer-director Alex O Eaton wanted Locke to play an eccentric Appalachian grandmother in Mountain Rest (2018), but she did not take the role, which ultimately went to the decade-younger Frances Conroy.

== Other activities ==
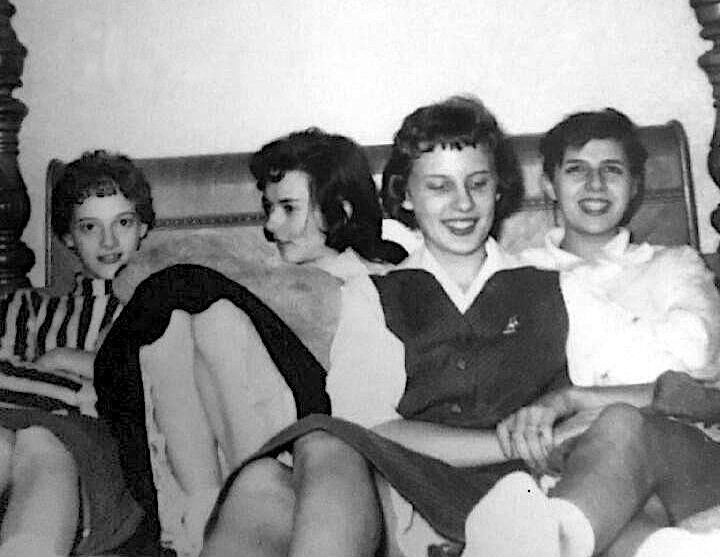
Locke (far left) with neighbors Helen Young, Carol Young, and Louise Davenport, c. 1958

=== Philanthropy ===
In the 1960s during her tenure at WSM, Locke participated in the annual United Cerebral Palsy (UCP) telethons. One year, she toured Birmingham with folk singer Richard Law.

Following her then-partner's April 15, 1986, inauguration as the 30th mayor of Carmel-by-the-Sea, California, Locke became the de facto First Lady of Carmel.

In 1992, she served as honorary chairwoman for the "Starry, Starry Night" silent auction in Costa Mesa, California, to benefit Human Options, a shelter for victims of domestic violence. "Being a woman I have great empathy for these women. I can understand how stranded they must feel, how hard it is to change one's life," Locke said. She also auctioned off a private lunch to raise money for the Los Angeles Ballet.

=== Wellness ===
By the end of the 1970s, Locke became a follower of research scientist Durk Pearson's views on longevity. In the book Life Extension: A Practical Scientific Approach (1982), which promotes the theory that free radicals are a primary cause of aging and recommends antioxidant supplements to prevent the damage they supposedly do, Locke was written about as a pseudonymous celebrity (Miss Jones) using the principles.

Locke was an avid sportswoman. In 1979 and 1982 respectively, for instance, she competed in the John Denver Celebrity Pro-Am ski tournament at Heavenly Mountain Resort and the Senator's Cup at John Gardiner's Tennis Ranch.

== Public image ==
Throughout her career, Locke appeared on many magazine covers including Club International, Family Weekly, Hello!, Kinema Junpo, National Enquirer, People, La Settimana Enigmistica, Star, TV Guide, Voici, Weekend and Woman. Australian rock band The Sports named their 1981 album Sondra in her honor. She became a significant subject of widespread media interest while dating Clint Eastwood, and they were dubbed a "golden couple" by Vanity Fair. Known for her wiles and feminine prowess, Locke possessed a certain mystique that left a lasting impression on audiences of the opposite sex. About her appeal, photographer Rick McGinnis said: "She made every male around her default to a courtly version of themselves, keeping their voice down, their manners in check, and their eagerness to see that she was comfortable at the foremost."

== Personal life ==
=== Marriage ===
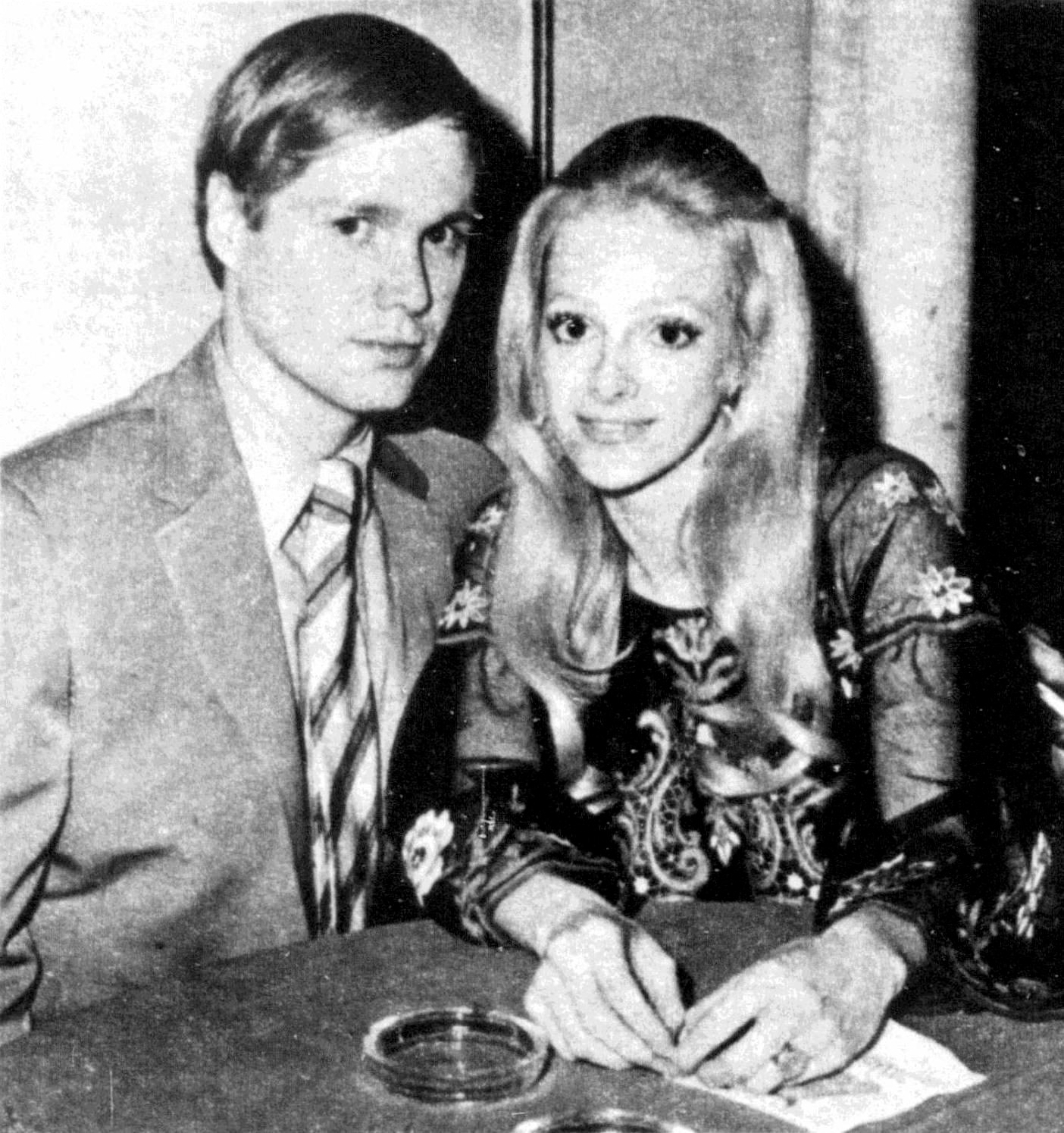
Mr. and Mrs. Anderson at the Beverly Hills Hotel in July 1968

On September 25, 1967, Locke married sculptor Gordon Leigh Anderson (Note: Gordon Anderson went by the stage name 'Gordon Addison' during a brief acting career before he married Locke. In 1969 it was announced that they would star in a film adaptation of Venable Herndon's play Until the Monkey Comes, which Anderson had done off-Broadway in 1966, but the project never came to fruition.) at the First Presbyterian Church in Nashville, one week after The Heart Is a Lonely Hunter commenced principal photography. Dr. Walter Rowe Courtenay presided over the ceremony. They remained married for 51 years until her death in 2018. (Note: For a long time it was falsely presumed that Locke and Anderson had divorced.)

Locke had known Anderson since at least the late 1950s; accounts as to when they met vary by as much as four years. (Note: In magazine interviews, Locke and Anderson would variously claim to have met when they were 10, 11 or 12, while Locke's memoir states that they met in high school. Anderson, like his late wife, always subtracted several years off his age, thus contributing to the plethora of discrepancies.) In 1968, as Locke was flooded with script offers amid Oscar buzz for Heart, she and Anderson left Tennessee and moved into a condominium at The Andalusia in West Hollywood.

According to a 1989 affidavit, the marriage was "tantamount to sister and brother" and they never consummated it. Anderson was gay. Locke, testifying under oath to a jury, characterized her husband as being "more like a sister to me" and explained, "it's funny the sort of cultural changes, but in those days males and females never lived together unless they were married." According to her death certificate, the two were residing at the same address when she died, and he was the person who registered her death.

Anderson is a central presence in Locke's autobiography, but she does not elaborate on her reasons for marrying him beyond the following passage:

However conventional or unconventional our marriage might turn out to be honestly did not concern me that much. I was very young, (Note: Actually, Locke was three years past the median age of first marriages for women in that era. To obscure this—and accommodate her revisionist narrative—she often peddled the fallacy of having gotten married "right out of high school", or as one ill-informed AP reporter put it, "during [her] childhood." Locke also was older than her husband Anderson, though some profiles of the actress misstate that he was the elder spouse. As a side effect of their changing age claims, dates erroneously attributed to the Andersons' wedding have ranged from as early as 1961 to as late as the early 1970s.) but I had come to feel that, for me, sex was the least important element in a relationship and the one thing that time had proven to me was that my love for Gordon came from such a deeply connected place that it transcended everything else.

It has been speculated that Locke had an ulterior motive for getting married at this busy time in her life. Some have suggested that she did it to prevent her promiscuous reputation back at WSM from spreading as she entered the limelight.

=== Romances ===
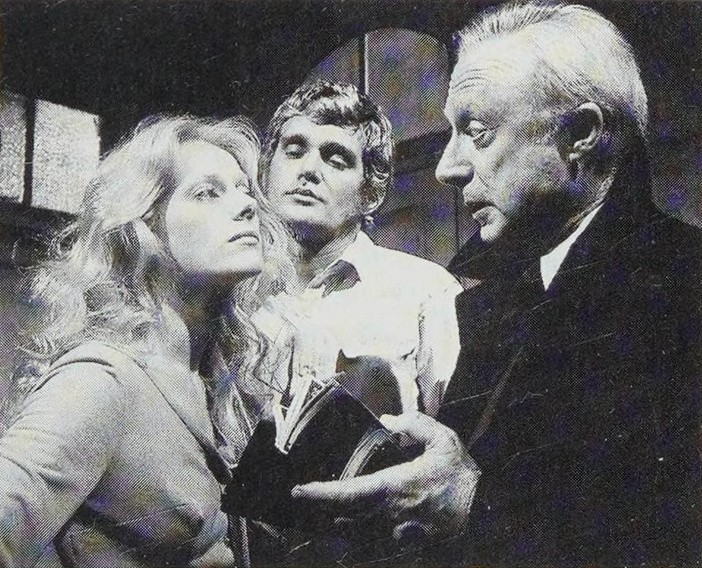
Locke had a two-year dalliance with Bo Hopkins (center), seen here next to Norman Lloyd in 1973's Gondola

Given that Locke waited decades to confirm that her marriage was platonic, most of her actual romantic attachments went unpublicized. In the mid-1960s, she dated her supervisor at WSM-TV's advertising department, Brad Crandall. She had started as secretary to Tom Griscom in local sales for WSM Radio. According to co-worker Alan Nelson, fellow staff members perceived Locke's promotion as an act of nepotism.

George Crook, a cameraman for WSM, squired Locke to Nashville society events such as the 1965 hunt ball. He later got into local politics and was elected mayor of Belle Meade in 2000. Another early boyfriend, personal injury attorney Gary Gober, starred with Locke in Circle Players' productions while attending Vanderbilt University Law School. Locke also dated sportscaster Larry Munson prior to marrying Anderson.

During her marriage, Locke was rumored to have been linked amorously to co-stars Robert Fields (Cover Me Babe), Bruce Davison (Willard), Paul Sand (The Second Coming of Suzanne), and Bo Hopkins (Gondola), as well as producer Hawk Koch, real-estate agent Herb Goldfarb, and John F. Kennedy's nephew Robert Shriver. (Note: Locke and Hopkins appeared as a couple on the game show Tattletales when Locke was still talking up her marriage in the press. Incredulously, the conflicting gestures attracted no news commentary.) For a while in the early 1970s, she shared a liaison with married actor David Soul after they played siblings in an episode of Cannon.

Locke referred to these intervals as "casually exploring for a romantic relationship," noting that she had not fallen in love with any of the men. "Love ... was not something to search out actively; it finds you, I believed."

=== Life with Eastwood ===
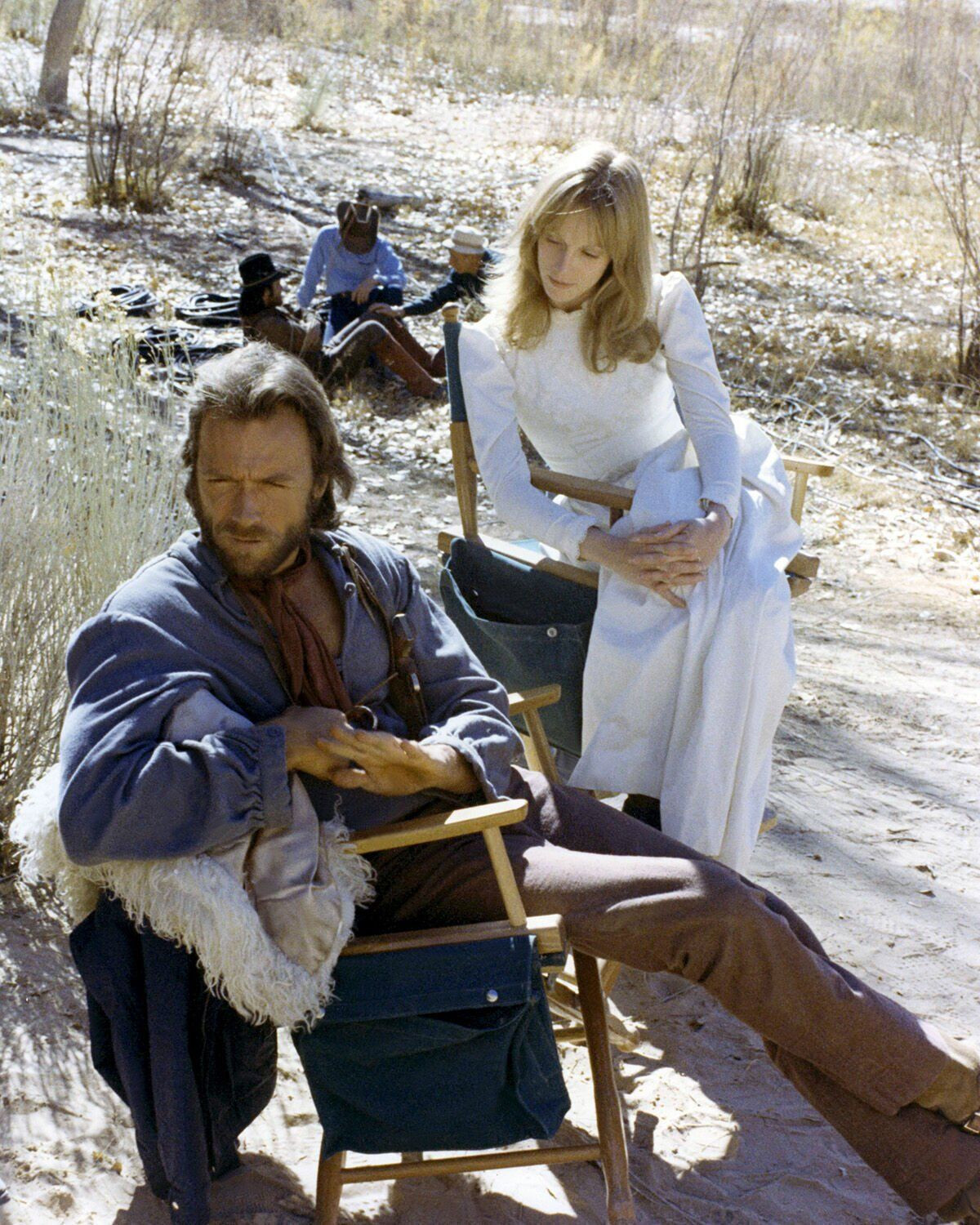
Eastwood and Locke in Kanab, Utah, 1975

Locke and actor/director Clint Eastwood entered a domestic partnership in October 1975. She first met Eastwood in 1972, when she unsuccessfully lobbied for the title role in his film Breezy (1973); they became involved upon arrival at the shooting location of The Outlaw Josey Wales (1976) in Page, Arizona. "It was just an immediate attraction between the two of us," Locke recalled in a 2012 documentary. She further revealed that they had sex on their first date. Locke had simultaneously been wooed by screenwriter Philip Kaufman but chose Eastwood over him. (Note: Philip Kaufman started to direct Josey, but was fired at Eastwood's command on October 24, 1975, three weeks into filming. Although Eastwood had conquered Locke within 48 hours of her arrival on set, initially she had declined his advances, having already said yes to a date with Kaufman at the costume fitting. According to biographer Patrick McGilligan, Eastwood begrudged the fact that a younger man had beaten him to the punch and therefore felt inclined to assert his dominance by getting rid of Kaufman. The love triangle resulted in the Director's Guild passing new legislation, known as the "Eastwood Rule", which prohibits an actor or producer from firing the director and then becoming the director himself.) After wrapping the film in December 1975, the couple shuttled between Eastwood's houses in Carmel and L.A.'s Sherman Oaks neighborhood, as well as rented homes in San Francisco and its elite suburb Tiburon. They eventually settled at 846 Stradella Road in Bel-Air, which Eastwood still owned at the time of Locke's death.

Eastwood was married during the early years of their relationship, before their affair became public in 1977, but his marriage was a nominal one just as Locke's was; he had sired at least two publicly unacknowledged children outside the marriage and confided he had "never been in love before." Locke claimed Eastwood even sang "She Made Me Monogamous" to her. Eastwood's wife Maggie Johnson lived on a colossal estate in Pebble Beach, where Eastwood rarely stayed, and Johnson and he were understood to have had an open marriage from the start. "I never knew I could love somebody so much, and feel so peaceful about it at the same time," Locke said he told her. Conversely, the media's going myth was that Eastwood "left" or "walked out on" his wife for Locke as opposed to simply giving up the facade. Locke resented having her romance with Eastwood labeled merely as an affair and being made to feel sordid as if she had "stolen" a married man, but did not contemporaneously refute such notions.

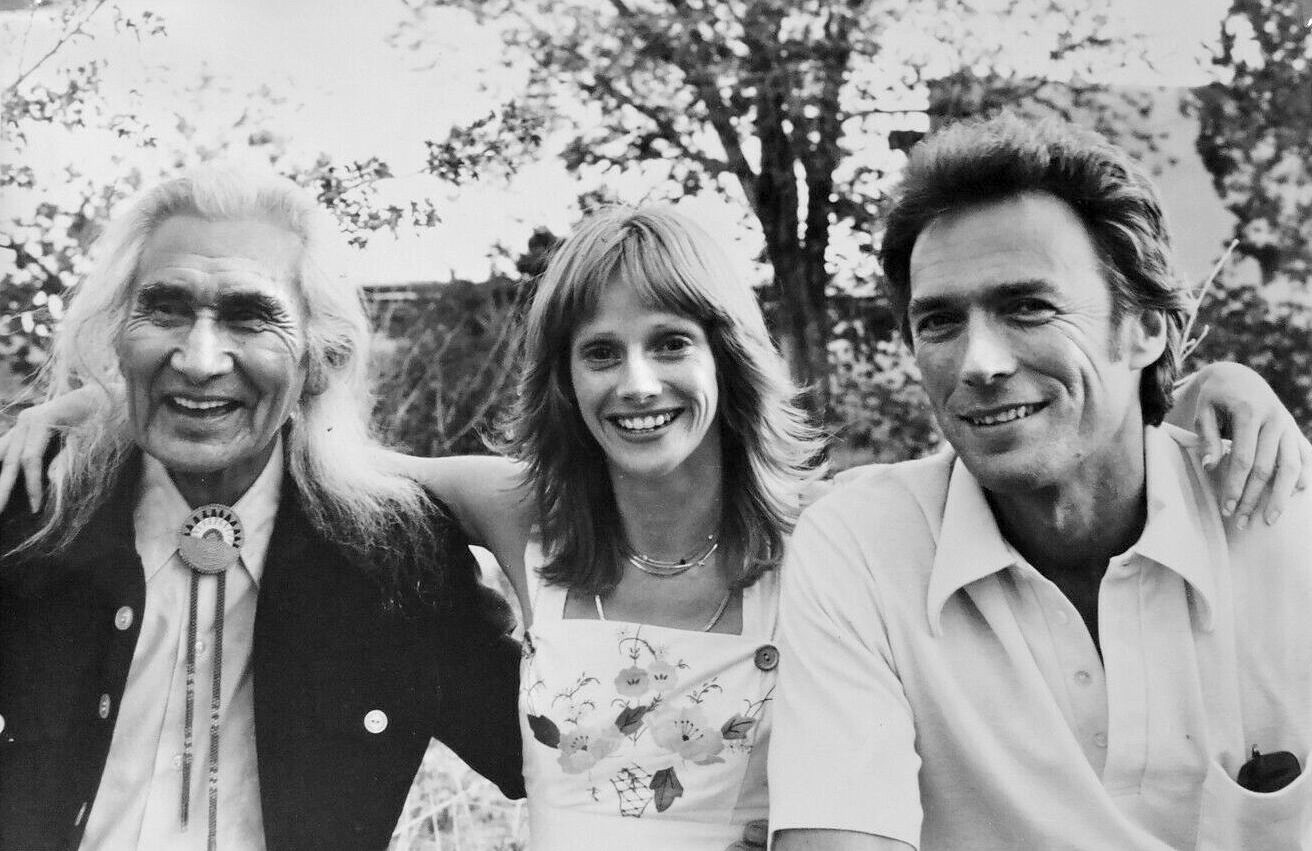
Chief Dan George with Locke and Eastwood at a barbecue in Santa Fe, New Mexico, 1976

Late in the 1970s, Locke became pregnant by Eastwood twice; she terminated both pregnancies. (Note: Locke explained in her autobiography: "Before I had met Clint my gynecologist had suggested and fitted for me an IUD. Because my sex life was not very active, he did not think I should be constantly taking birth control pills. Clint complained of the IUD – it was uncomfortable for him, he said. And he too was not in favor of birth control pills, so he suggested a special clinic at Cedars Hospital where they taught a 'natural' method of birth control. It was the same 'rhythm' system that historically has been used to determine the fertile days for those who are attempting to achieve pregnancy. Of course, it could be used for the opposite results as well. Not only was I taught their method but I was constantly monitored with regular pregnancy checks. The whole process was awkward and entailed taking my temperature every morning and marking the calendar, etc. It was demanding and ultimately it had failed twice.") "I'd feel sorry for any child that had me for a mother," she told syndicated columnist Dick Kleiner in 1969. In 1979, at the age of 35, Locke underwent a tubal ligation at UCLA Medical Center, citing Eastwood's adamancy that parenthood would not fit into their lifestyle. (Note: According to the National Library of Medicine, the median age for a woman getting tubal ligation in America is 33.) When this became public knowledge a decade after the fact, Eastwood issued a statement:

I adamantly deny and deeply resent the accusation that either one of those abortions or the tubal ligation were done at my demand, request or even suggestion. As to the abortions, I told Locke that whether to have children or terminate her pregnancies was a decision entirely hers. Particularly with regard to the tubal ligation, I encouraged Locke to make her own decision after she had consulted with a physician about the appropriateness of and the necessity for that surgical procedure.

Locke professed mixed feelings on the matter, stating in one chapter of her autobiography that she was grateful she had not had Eastwood's children, while writing in another, "I couldn't help but think that that baby, with both Clint's and my best qualities, would be extraordinary." Eastwood claimed Locke told him on multiple occasions that she never wanted to have children.

Eastwood and Locke were still cohabiting, when in the latter half of the 1980s, he secretly fathered another woman's two children—a fact that did not come to light for almost 20 years. (Note: Although the existence of Eastwood's offspring by Jacelyn Reeves was reported in tabloids such as Star and in Locke's autobiography during the 1990s, it continued to be ignored by reputable media sources until about 2006. As late as 2003, for instance, A&E produced a two-hour, authorized Biography episode on Eastwood, which gave the false impression he had a total of only four children, when he in fact has at least eight.) Despite her affirmed ignorance, Locke sensed growing tension in the relationship around 1985, recollecting, "although I definitely still loved Clint, I didn't much like him, nor did I much trust him anymore." In retrospect, she gathered, "either he changed from white to black, or I had been living with somebody I didn't even know."

==== Palimony suit ====
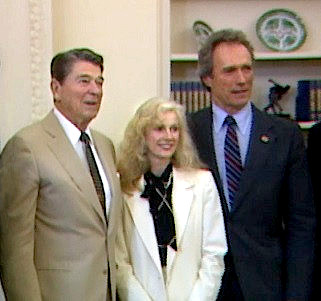
Ronald Reagan with Locke and Eastwood in the Oval Office, 1987

According to court testimony, Locke confronted Eastwood over his passive-aggressive behavior on December 29, 1988, (Note: Eastwood's passive-aggressive maneuvers included inviting Jane Brolin—a woman he was having an affair with—to join Locke and himself on their annual ski trip to Sun Valley. The two women got into a row just before New Year's Eve, Locke recalling, "I wanted to hit her, to pull every hair out of her head.") eliciting estrangement between the couple. Locke testified that after Eastwood and she made their final joint appearance on January 6 at the American Cinema Awards, they spent exactly two nights together, without intimate contact. Eastwood then effectively vacated their Bel-Air mansion, sleeping in the adjacent caretakers' quarters or at his apartment in Burbank. Locke thought Eastwood was acting out "because he wasn't number one at the box-office anymore, or because he was facing his mortality." (Eastwood was 58 at the time.) As far as she was concerned, their relationship was still salvageable. At any rate, she called divorce lawyer Norman Oberstein to explore her options should the separation be permanent. Unbeknownst to Locke, Eastwood eavesdropped on those consultations by means of a wiretap that he placed on their home phone in early March.

On the morning of April 3 or 4, Eastwood complained in the kitchen that Locke was "sitting on [his] only real estate in Los Angeles" and bolted. Locke later defensively declared: "Clint is not good at direct communication. He really is a man of few words. You might just as well have a direct confrontation with a wall." On April 10, 1989, Malpaso employees changed the locks on the family residence, moved Locke's possessions into storage, and posted security guards at the front gate per Eastwood's order. Locke was shooting Impulse at the time of the lockout. She filed a $70 million palimony suit on April 26, charging Eastwood with breach of contract, emotional distress, forcible entry, and possession of stolen goods. Forced abortions and compulsory sterilization were also cited, though Locke later recategorized those operations as a "mutual decision". (Note: Locke's initial account provoked backlash from her peers. Joan Collins, openly postabortive herself, told the press, "apart from being married already, she didn't have to stay with Clint. She wasn't chained to the bedpost.")

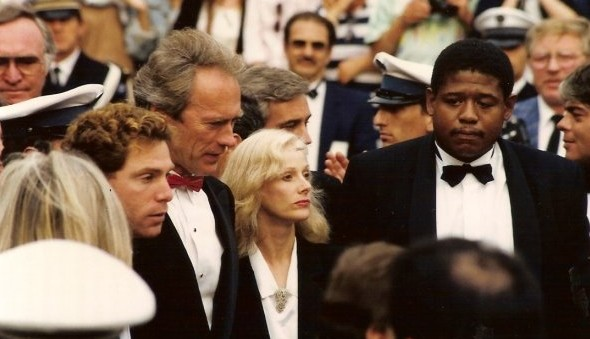
Michael Zelniker, Eastwood, Locke, and Forest Whitaker promoting Bird (1988) at the Cannes film festival

During their 14 years as de facto husband and wife, Locke and Eastwood had occupied seven homes and acquired four, including a retreat in Sun Valley, Idaho, and the Rising River Ranch near Cassel, California. Locke sought half of Eastwood's earnings and an equal division of property, requesting title to the house in Bel-Air and to the Gothic-style West Hollywood place Eastwood had leased to Gordon Anderson since 1982. She also asked Judge Dana Senit Henry to bar Eastwood from the Bel-Air house "because I know him to have a terrible temper ... and he has frequently been abusive to me."

Locke battled Eastwood in court for 19 months; she developed breast cancer during proceedings, and she said the treatments sapped her will to fight. In November 1990, the parties reached a private settlement wherein Eastwood set up a $1.5 million multi-year film development/directing pact for Locke at Warner Bros. in exchange for dropping the suit. She was awarded the West Hollywood property (valued at $2.2 million), $450,000 cash, and unspecified monthly support payments, as well.

The breakup affected Locke's social life. Her closest friends had been the wives of Eastwood's colleagues: Maria Shriver, Cynthia Sikes Yorkin, and Lili Fini Zanuck, all 10 to 11 years younger than Locke and married to film industry heavyweights Arnold Schwarzenegger, Bud Yorkin, and Richard D. Zanuck, respectively. Locke's friendships with those women gradually faded as their husbands ghosted her. The female comrades Locke credited with loyalty and support were those she had known before Eastwood—art director Elayne Barbara Ceder, whom she met on The Second Coming of Suzanne, and realtor Denise Fraker, wife of A Reflection of Fear director William A. Fraker.

==== Fraud suit ====
Between 1990 and 1993, Warner Bros. rejected more than 30 scripts that Locke pitched to the studio—including those for Junior (1994) and Addicted to Love (1997)—and refused to let her direct any of their in-house projects. When her contract had yielded no directing assignments three years in, Locke became convinced the deal was a sham. She began to seek corroboration, and came across incriminating printouts from WB's bookkeeping records. Locke contended that the money WB pretended they were paying her came from Eastwood's pocket and was laundered through the operating budget of Unforgiven (1992). In June 1995, she sued him again, for fraud and breach of fiduciary duty. According to Locke's attorney Peggy Garrity, Eastwood committed "the ultimate betrayal" by arranging the "bogus" deal as a way to keep her out of work. Garrity added that Eastwood had held out the allegedly counterfeit deal "like a dangled carrot" to persuade Locke to drop the earlier palimony suit. Locke said that she "was stunned and outraged at the way I had been tricked and cheated a second time."

The case went to trial in September 1996. One juror divulged that the panel sided with Locke by a 10-to-2 vote (nine votes are needed for a verdict) and were only debating the amount. Before any court decision could be made, Locke settled the case with Eastwood for an undisclosed amount of money. The outcome, Locke said, sent a "loud and clear" message to Hollywood, "that people cannot get away with whatever they want to just because they're powerful." According to Locke, "in this business, people get so accustomed to being abused, they just accept the abuse and say, 'Well, that's just the way it is.' Well, it isn't."

For his part, Eastwood waved the lawsuit off as a "dime-novel plot," continuing, "it's all about money ... about getting something for nothing." He accused Locke of using her cancer to gain the jury's sympathy, and cryptically suggested that karma would catch up with her.

Locke brought a separate action against Warner Bros. for allegedly conspiring with Eastwood to sabotage her directorial career. As had happened with the previous lawsuit, this ended in an out-of-court settlement in May 1999. By then, Locke had fired Garrity and hired Neil Papiano to represent her. (Note: In June 1999, Garrity sued Locke to get paid for persuading the appellate court to reinstate Locke v. Warner Bros. Inc. WB had requested summary judgement after the original March 1994 filing, which the court granted, but in August 1997, the decision was reversed. Garrity put 2,500 hours of work into the case, only to be ditched by Locke and replaced by Papiano in May 1998. Garrity won her lawsuit, and remarked that the payment would not have cost Locke a dime more than what was already going to legal fees, since it would simply have come out of Papiano's one-third contingency fee.) The agreement with Warner Bros., Locke said, was "a happy ending." "I feel elated. This has been the best day in a long, long time," she told reporters on courthouse steps. The case is used in some modern law-school contract textbooks to illustrate the legal concept of good faith.

=== Illness; last relationship ===
A lifelong nonsmoker (save for a few film roles), Locke practiced Transcendental Meditation and worked out with weights, though she hated running. In September 1990, she confirmed reports that she had breast cancer. "Due to factors in my personal life, I have sustained two years of extreme and unnecessary stress, which my doctors tell me has been my enemy," Locke said at the time. She added that Eastwood never reached out to her after her diagnosis: "He doesn't care if I live or die."

Locke underwent a double mastectomy at Cedars-Sinai Medical Center, followed by chemotherapy. During treatment, she began dating Scott Cunneen (born September 10, 1961, Long Beach, California), an intern assigned to perform the postsurgical checkup. Unfazed by their 17-year age difference—and the fact Locke was just three years younger than his mother—they soon went public with the romance, dining at paparazzi hotspot Spago on one of their early dates in November 1990. Cunneen moved in with her in the spring of 1991. She called it a "real, supportive, and equal relationship."

In February 2001, Locke purchased a six-bedroom gated mansion in the Hollywood Hills, where she resided for the remainder of her life. Built in 1925, the home's interior was redesigned to look like Locke's old house on Stradella Road. Cunneen and she eventually broke up, albeit without publicity, since she had faded from public view. (Note: The exact year of this breakup is not known with certainty. The Notable Names Database, generally considered to be an unreliable source, cites 2001. Seeing as how the split was never formally announced, the timeframe aforesaid might be an approximation inferred from Locke's real-estate transactions, as L.A. Times newshound Ruth Ryon reported she offloaded one of her properties that year. French historian Pierre Maraval's documentary L'album secret de Clint Eastwood (2012), partially filmed at Locke's last home, stated in the narration that she lived alone.)

In 2004, Locke settled a personal injury lawsuit brought against her in Beverly Hills by one Mark Feigin, whom she had accidentally struck with an automobile the previous year.

In 2015, after a 25-year period of apparent remission, Locke's cancer returned and metastasized to her bones.

== Death ==
Locke died at age 74 on November 3, 2018, at her Los Angeles home from cardiac arrest related to breast and bone cancer. Her remains were cremated on November 9 at Pierce Brothers Westwood Village Memorial Park and Mortuary and the ashes were given to her widower, Gordon Anderson. (Note: Major media outlets including Variety wrongly reported that Locke "was laid to rest" at Westwood rather than cremated.) Locke bequeathed Anderson an estimated fortune of $20 million and seemed to have always supported him financially.

=== Media blackout ===
Locke's death was kept secret until December 13, when Radar Online broke the news the day before Eastwood's latest film The Mule (2018) opened in theaters nationwide, citing the Los Angeles County Department of Public Health. The Associated Press said, "it is not clear why it took nearly six weeks to come to light." Anderson, according to the scant AP report, was unreachable, and a representative for Locke ignored People's request for comment. Basic facts had been kept so hidden that The New York Times noted 41 days after she died: "A list of survivors was not immediately [sic] available."

Locke's death received no television coverage except for a 15-second spot on ABC World News Tonight. Eastwood did not comment on the death, nor did any of Locke's other living exes, nor any of her friends or relatives. Co-stars such as Richard Dreyfuss, Cicely Tyson, Louie Anderson, Sally Kellerman, Stacy Keach, and Ted Neeley—all active on social media—were equally silent. On the 91st Academy Awards telecast, broadcast nearly four months after Locke died, she was omitted from the "In Memoriam" segment. In absence of any explanation, some surmised that Locke requested the blackout in her final wishes, perhaps to keep her real age under wraps.

== Legacy ==
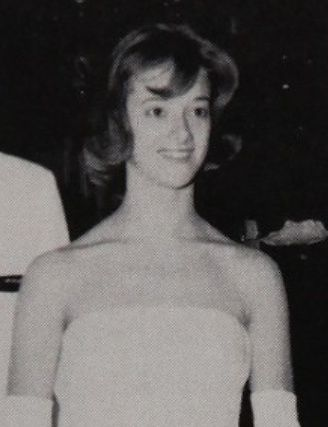
Locke in 1961, the year before she started bleaching her hair blonde (Note: In a 1968 interview, Locke told beauty columnist Lydia Lane she was a natural blonde.)

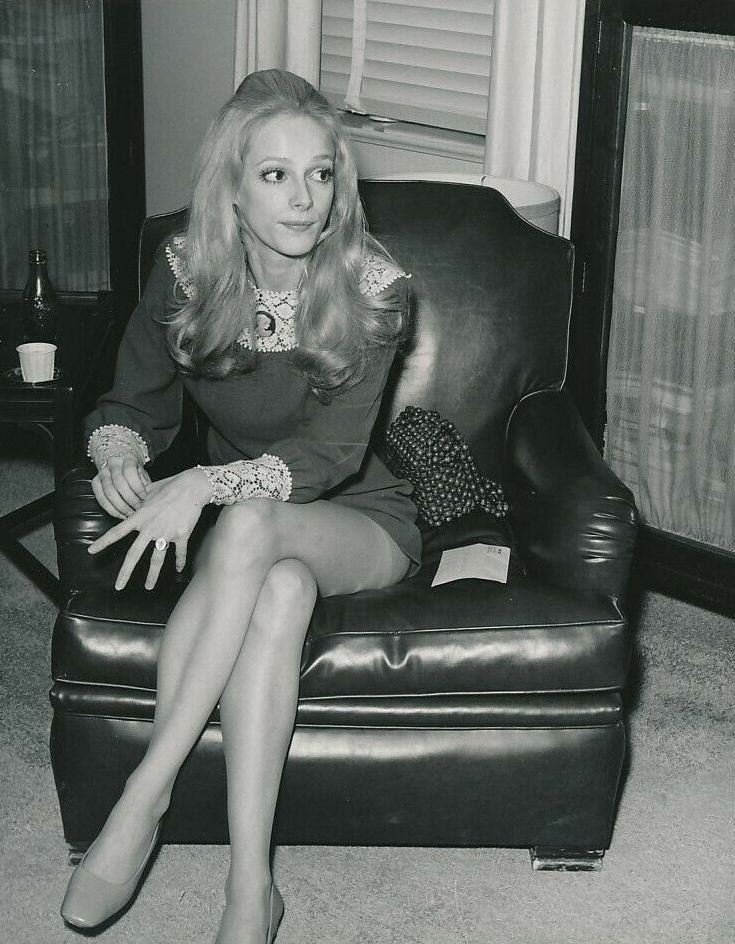
Locke at a 1968 press conference

Locke is remembered as an early pioneer for women in Hollywood. She was one of 11 female filmmakers in 1990, the year WB released her sophomore feature, Impulse. By the time of Trading Favors (1997), her fourth effort, still only eight percent of all films were made by women, per the Directors Guild of America.

Locke's influence as a feminist icon was duly acknowledged by the mainstream press. In 1989, Claudia Puig of the Los Angeles Times described her lawsuit against Clint Eastwood as a "precedent-setting legal case, as it raises the question of whether a woman, who is legally married to one man, can claim palimony rights from another." Childfree by choice—unusual for a person of her generation—Locke was among the first celebrities to publicly discuss her abortion experiences. The avowal made Locke "a talking-point in America's sexual politics debate," according to The Guardian's Peter Bradshaw. Locke's subsequent relationship with a doctor young enough to be her son added to her notoriety.

Cinematographer David Worth credits Locke with his big break. She is admired by such actresses as Frances Fisher and Rosanna Arquette, who applauded the strength of her directorial accomplishments, however short-lived.

During the last quarter of her life, Locke maintained she was blacklisted from the film industry as a result of her acrimonious split from Eastwood, while his career continued unscathed. Peggy Garrity, Locke's former counsel, recalled the courtroom drama in her book In the Game: The Highs and Lows of a Trailblazing Trial Lawyer (2016). Garrity revealed that Locke's 1999 confidential settlement from WB "was for many millions more than the settlement with Clint had been." Locke v. Warner Bros. Inc also catalyzed changes within the legal system. In a landmark decision, California's Supreme Court ruled that access to civil trials could no longer be closed to the public.

Numerous outlets faced pushback over their chosen headlines for Locke's obituary. Several major publications prefaced news of her death by tagging Eastwood's name atop the article, which drew criticism by some who deemed it a sexist epitaph, with fans online pointing out that Locke was an Oscar nominee prior to meeting Eastwood. Women's blog Jezebel criticized The Hollywood Reporter for ostensibly regarding Locke as a nonentity; THR subsequently changed its headline. News organization TheWrap—whose editor, Sharon Waxman, reviewed Locke's memoir for The Washington Post in 1997—opined that her story "should stir resonance in this age of the #MeToo movement." In a tribute to the late actress, author Sarah Weinman wrote: "Sondra Locke, like Barbara Loden, deserves to be known for her work, not for the famous man she was disastrously involved with."

Among those voicing an unfavorable opinion of Locke was film scholar Rex Reed, who had interviewed her for a 1967 New York Times profile. "[She] lied so much during her brief but colorful career," Reed wrote in an essay for Observer, "that when she lost her battle with cancer at age 74, I wondered if it was a publicity stunt." (Note: Locke had been subjected to death rumors in the past, when she was commonly mistaken for actress Jill Ireland.)

Candid photographs of Locke and Eastwood in their heyday are on display at the Frazetta Art Museum in East Stroudsburg, Pennsylvania, next to Frank Frazetta's exaggerated portrait of the couple that was used on the poster for The Gauntlet (1977). One film in which she appeared—The Outlaw Josey Wales (1976)—has been preserved in the National Film Registry.

The end credits of Bad Therapy (2020) pay homage to her.

=== Our Very Own ===
In 1971, fifth graders at Eastside Elementary in Locke's hometown of Shelbyville, Tennessee, were left star-struck when Locke made a visit and held pretend "auditions" in the class to show them what it was like in Hollywood. One student, Cameron Watson, was inspired by Locke and is now an actor/director. Watson's period drama Our Very Own (2005) takes place in Shelbyville in 1978 and concerns a group of teenagers who want to meet Locke when she returns to town for the local premiere of Every Which Way but Loose. Watson decided to do the movie after performing a standup routine about Locke and about how people in Shelbyville were obsessed with her.

Locke attended one of those performances in 2004 at the Tiffany Theater in West Hollywood. "The minute she heard the first reference to her or to her family, she threw up her arms: 'What the hell is this?'" Watson said. "By the end of the reading, she was doubled over." Locke gave the script her blessing and accepted an invitation to be special guest at the film's premiere. The movie was a "special gift" to Locke, according to Deborah Obenchain, another Eastside student who said she did not think Locke really understood her impact on the small town she once called home. "I think it meant just as much to her. … In our own way … we got to live out a little bit of our dreams by making the movie and meeting her."

== Filmography ==
=== As actress ===
Year	Title	Role	Notes	Ref.
1966	For Better, For Worse	Jill	Short subject Credited as Sandra Locke	
1968	The Heart Is a Lonely Hunter	Margaret 'Mick' Kelly	Nominated—Academy Award for Best Supporting Actress; Nominated—Golden Globe Award for Best Supporting Actress – Motion Picture; Nominated—Golden Globe Award for Most Promising Newcomer – Female; Nominated—Laurel Award for Female Supporting Performance; Nominated—Laurel Award for Female New Face	
1970	Cover Me Babe	Melisse		
1971	Willard	Joan Simms		
1972	A Reflection of Fear	Marguerite		
1972	Night Gallery	Sheila Gray	Episode: "A Feast of Blood"	
1972	The F.B.I.	Regina Mason	Episode: "Dark Christmas"	
1973	Cannon	Trish Caton	Episode: "Death of a Stone Seahorse"	
1973	The ABC Afternoon Playbreak	Nora Sells	Episode: "My Secret Mother"	
1973	Gondola	Jackie	TV movie	
1974	The Second Coming of Suzanne	Suzanne		
1974	Kung Fu	Gwyneth Jenkins	Episode: "This Valley of Terror"	
1974	Planet of the Apes	Amy	Episode: "The Cure"	
1975	Barnaby Jones	Alicia	Episode: "The Orchid Killer"	
1975	Cannon	Tracy Murdock	Episode: "A Touch of Venom"	
1976	Joe Forrester	Pam Wilson	Episode: "A Game of Love"	
1976	The Outlaw Josey Wales	Laura Lee		
1977	Death Game	Agatha Jackson		
1977	The Shadow of Chikara	Drusilla Wilcox		
1977	The Gauntlet	Augustina 'Gus' Mally		
1978	Every Which Way but Loose	Lynn Halsey-Taylor		
1979	Friendships, Secrets and Lies	Jessie Dunne	TV movie	
1980	Bronco Billy	Antoinette Lily	Nominated—Golden Raspberry Award for Worst Actress	
1980	Any Which Way You Can	Lynn Halsey-Taylor		
1982	Rosie: The Rosemary Clooney Story	Rosemary Clooney	TV movie	
1983	Sudden Impact	Jennifer Spencer		
1984	Tales of the Unexpected	Edna	Episode: "Bird of Prey"	
1985	Amazing Stories	Vanessa Sullivan	Episode: "Vanessa in the Garden"	
1986	Ratboy	Nikki Morrison	Also director Nominated—Golden Raspberry Award for Worst Actress	
1999	The Prophet's Game	Adele Highsmith (adult)		
1999	Clean and Narrow	Betsy Brand		
2018	Ray Meets Helen	Helen	Also executive producer	

=== As director ===
Year	Title	Ref.
1986	Ratboy	
1990	Impulse	
1995	Death in Small Doses	
1997	Trading Favors	

== Stage ==
Year	Show	Role	Venue	Ref(s)
1962	The Monkey's Paw	Mrs. White	Bud Frank Theatre, Johnson City, Tennessee	
1962	Life with Father	Mary Skinner	Tucker Theater, Murfreesboro, Tennessee	
1963	The Crucible	Mary Warren	Tucker Theater, Murfreesboro, Tennessee	
1964	Life with Mother	Cora Miller	Belcourt Playhouse, Nashville, Tennessee	
1964	The Innocents	Flora	Circle Theater, Nashville, Tennessee	
1964	A Thousand Clowns	Dr. Sandra Markowitz	Circle Theater, Nashville, Tennessee	
1965	Night of the Iguana	Charlotte Goodall	Circle Theater, Nashville, Tennessee	
1965	Oh Dad, Poor Dad, Mamma's Hung You in the Closet and I'm Feelin' So Sad	Rosalie	Circle Theater, Nashville, Tennessee	
1965	The Glass Menagerie	Laura Wingfield	Circle Theater, Nashville, Tennessee	
1967	Tiger at the Gates	Helen of Troy	Vanderbilt Theatre, Nashville, Tennessee	

== Discography ==
Year	Title	Label	Catalog number
1978	"I Seek The Night / Don't Say You Don't Love Me No More"	Elektra Records	E46007
1980	"Too Loose"	Warner Records	WBS49674

== Gallery ==
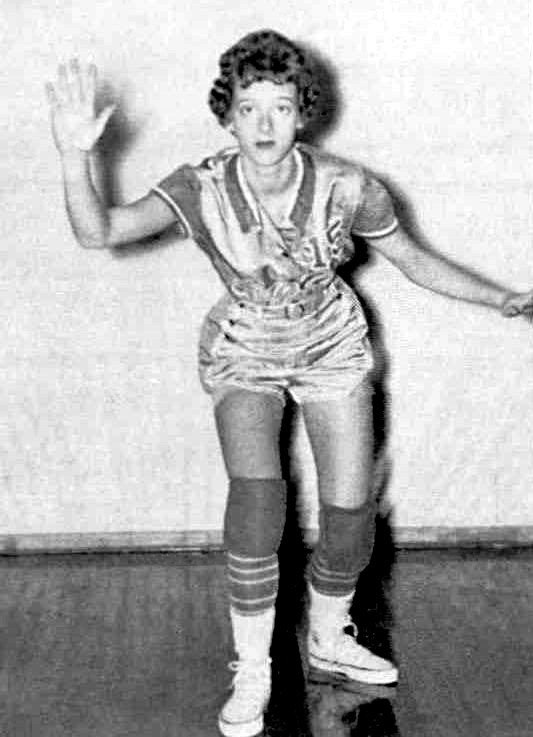
Sophomore basketball portrait, 1959

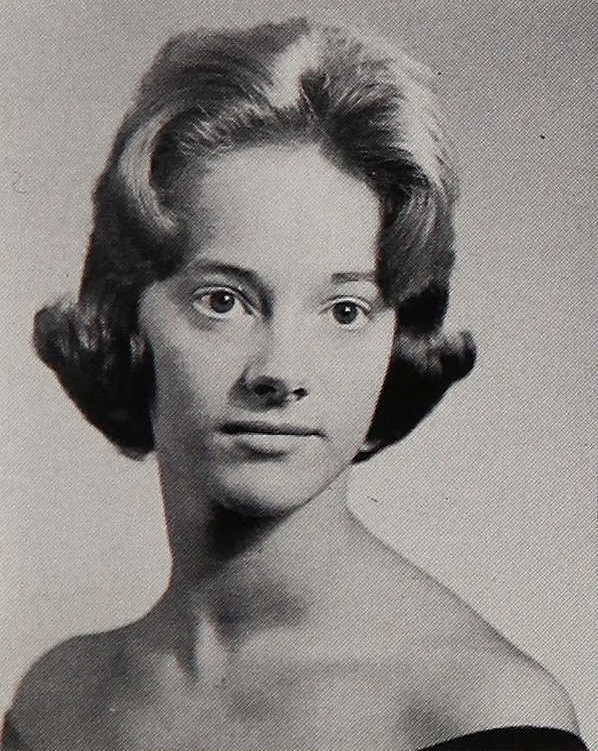
Senior yearbook photo, 1962

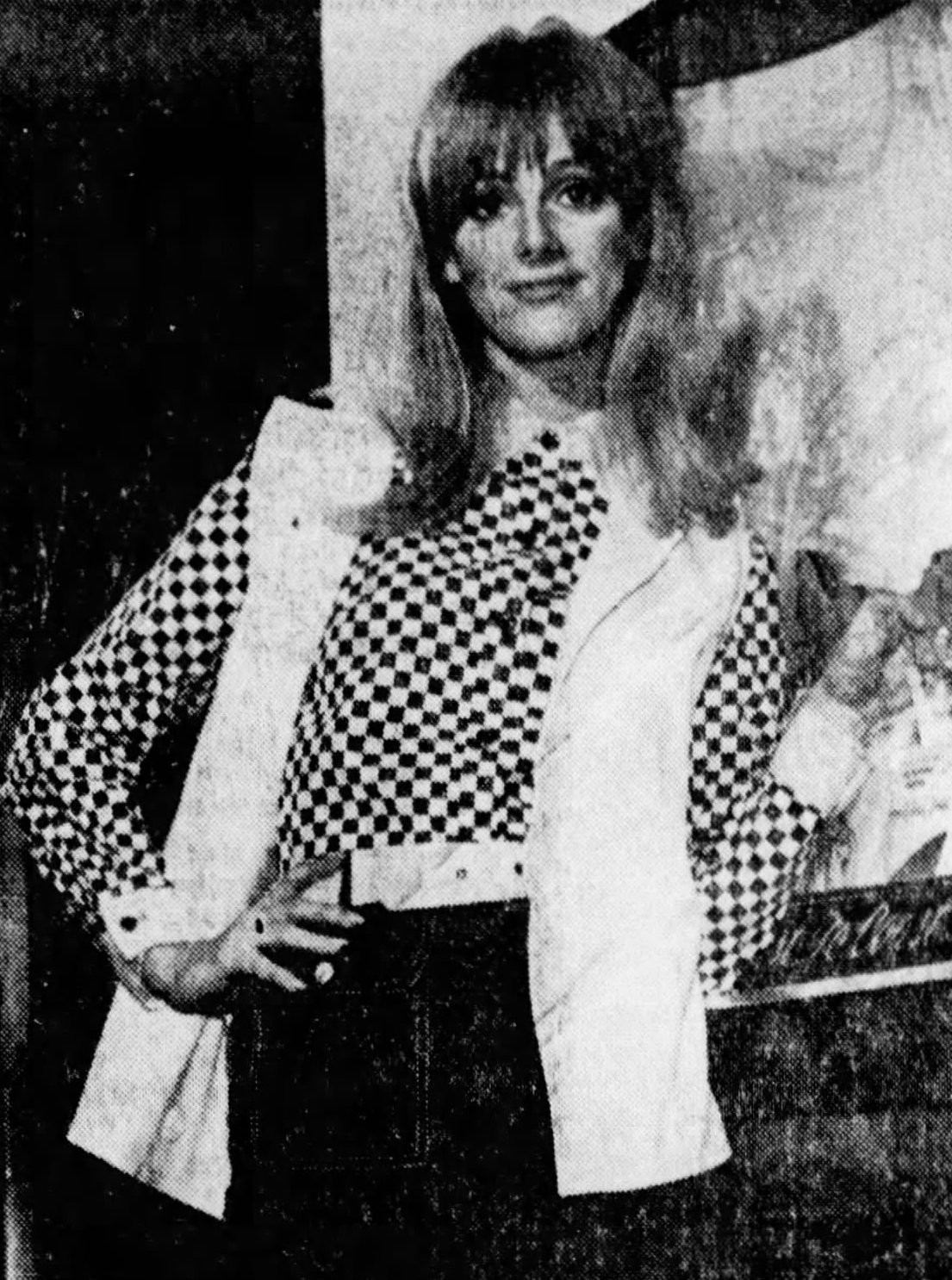
Modeling wardrobe by Bobbie Brooks, 1966

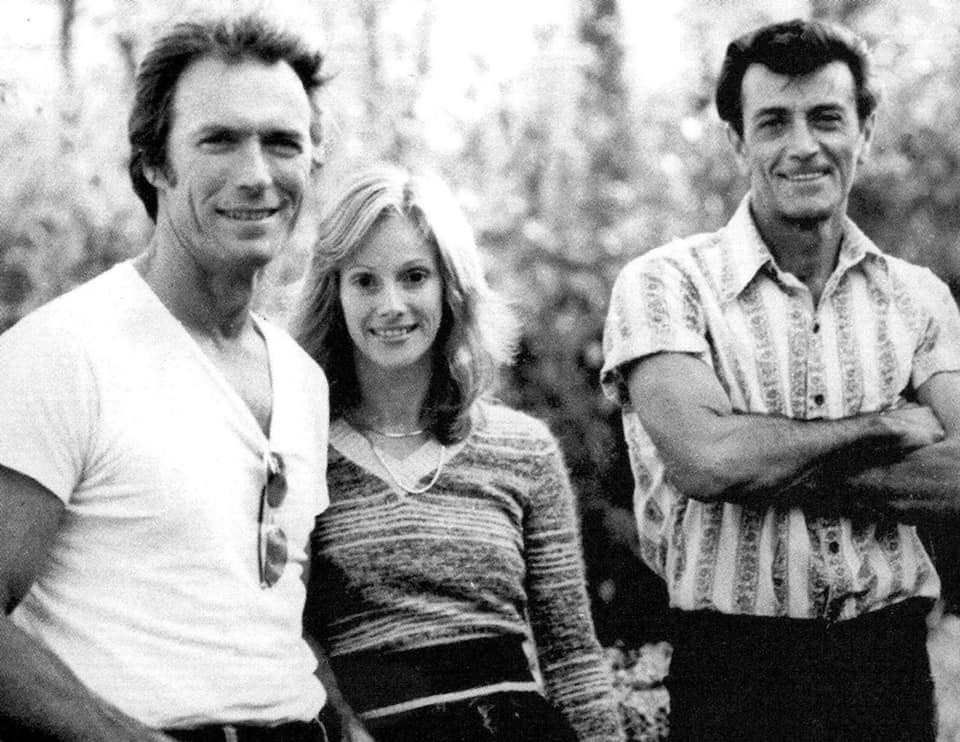
With Eastwood on a visit to Frank Frazetta, 1977

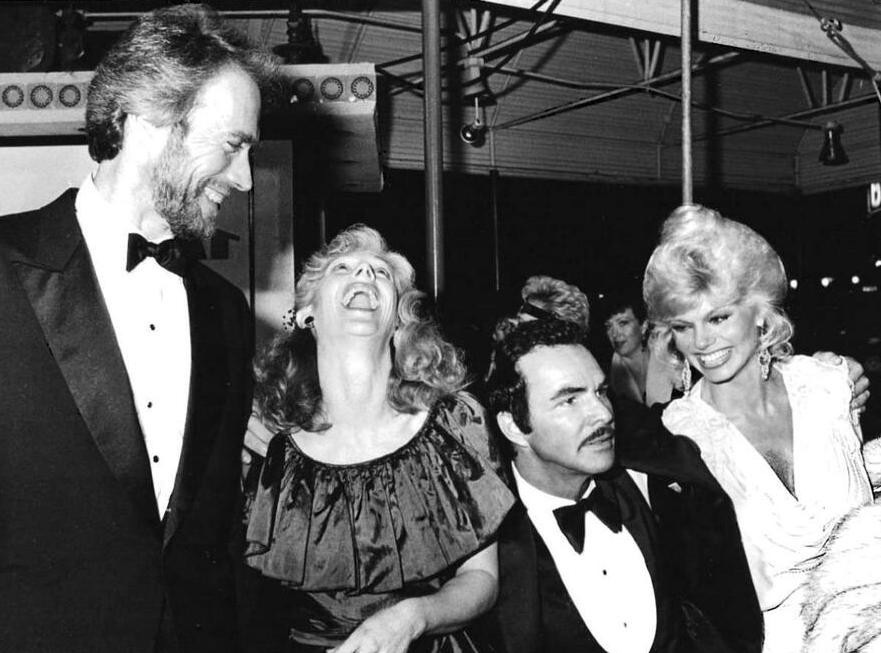
At the City Heat premiere with Eastwood, Burt Reynolds and Loni Anderson, 1984

== See also ==
- Age fabrication
- False premise
- List of actors with Academy Award nominations
- List of female film and television directors
- List of Middle Tennessee State University people
