= Trading Favors =

1997 American crime drama film

- Film poster
- Directed by: Sondra Locke
- Screenplay by: Timothy Albaugh; Tag Mendillo
- Story by: Timothy Albaugh
- Produced by: Don Dunn; Andrew Form; Rick Lashbrook; Tag Mendillo
- Starring: Rosanna Arquette; George Dzundza; Devon Gummersall; Julie Ariola; Frances Fisher
- Cinematography: Sidney Sidell; Julie Rogers
- Edited by: Annette Davey
- Music by: Jeff Rona
- Production companies: Mendillo/Form Productions; Rick Lashbrook Films
- Distributed by: Do Me a Favor Productions; Imperial Entertainment; Trimark Home Video
- Release date: June 4, 1997; (Hungary)
- Running time: 103 minutes
- Country: United States
- Language: English

Trading Favors is a 1997 American crime drama film directed by Sondra Locke starring Rosanna Arquette.

== Plot ==
Lincoln Muller's life turns upside down when he asks an attractive woman to buy him a beer at a convenience store. Then he learns that both she and her abusive boyfriend are into crime and violence, and Lincoln has been sucked in whether he likes it or not.

== Cast ==
- Rosanna Arquette as Alex Langley
- George Dzundza as Wallace Muller
- Devon Gummersall as Lincoln Muller
- Julie Ariola as Judy Muller
- Frances Fisher as Librarian
- Jason Hervey as Andy
- Craig Nigh as Bobby
- Duke Valenti as Biker
- Chad Lowe as Marty
- Saachiko as Rosie
- Rolando Molina as Hector
- Marty McSorley as The Bouncer
- Paul Herman as The Bartender
- Alanna Ubach as Christy
- Richard Riehle as Highway Patrolman
- Lin Shaye as Darla
- Peter Greene as Teddy
- Cuba Gooding Jr. as Liquor Store Clerk

== Production ==
The original script title was Do Me a Favor.
