= Any Which Way You Can =

1980 film by Buddy Van Horn

- Theatrical release poster by Bill Gold and Bob Peak
- Directed by: Buddy Van Horn
- Written by: Stanford Sherman
- Based on: Characters by Jeremy Joe Kronsberg
- Produced by: Fritz Manes
- Starring: Clint Eastwood; Sondra Locke; Geoffrey Lewis; William Smith; Harry Guardino; Ruth Gordon
- Cinematography: David Worth
- Edited by: Ron Spang; Ferris Webster
- Production company: The Malpaso Company
- Distributed by: Warner Bros.
- Release date: December 17, 1980
- Running time: 116 minutes
- Country: United States
- Language: English
- Budget: $15 million
- Box office: $70.7 million (North America)

Any Which Way You Can is a 1980 American action comedy film directed by Buddy Van Horn in his feature directorial debut and starring Clint Eastwood, with Sondra Locke, Geoffrey Lewis, William Smith, and Ruth Gordon in supporting roles. The film is the sequel to the 1978 hit comedy Every Which Way but Loose. The cast of the previous film return as Philo Beddoe (Eastwood) reluctantly comes out of retirement from underground bare-knuckle boxing to take on a champion hired by the mafia, who will stop at nothing to ensure the fight takes place, while the neo-Nazi biker gang Philo humiliated in the previous film also comes back for revenge.

== Plot ==
Two years after throwing his fight with Tank Murdock, Philo Beddoe is still fighting in underground bare-knuckle boxing matches. He still lives in a house with Clyde, his pet orangutan, on the property of his best friend Orville Boggs and Orville's mother. He decides to retire when he realizes that he has started to enjoy the pain. One evening, Philo encounters his ex-girlfriend, country-western singer Lynn Halsey-Taylor, singing at his favorite bar. Lynn apologizes to Philo, and he forgives her. They become a couple again and move in together.

The Black Widows, the biker gang with a grudge against Philo, return. However, he bests them in a chase that runs through an asphalt machine during a road-paving project.

Meanwhile, Jack Wilson, a new breed of fighter from the East Coast who mixes martial arts with boxing, dominates the bare-knuckle circuit. After a fight between a mongoose and a rattlesnake, one of the handlers realizes that if Philo, king of the West Coast brawlers, agreed to fight Wilson, it would be the biggest draw in the history of bare-knuckle boxing. Philo agrees to the fight but after much prodding from Orville and Lynn, withdraws. The handlers, led by handicapper Jimmy Beekman and backed by the Mafia, kidnap Lynn to coerce Philo to show up for the fight. The fight is to take place near Jackson, Wyoming. The Black Widows follow Philo there.

Wilson, however, is a prize fighter with morals. After he learns of the plot and helps Philo and Orville rescue Lynn, he and Philo call off the fight. However, both men's pride makes them wonder who would have won. The brawl takes place, but it is punctuated by pauses and reflections on their admiration for each other. Meanwhile, the Black Widows bet everything they have on Philo. When the mobsters try to kill Philo once he gains the upper hand, the Black Widows protect their investment by beating up the Mafia men. Wilson breaks Philo's arm and offers to end the fight, but the men continue the brawl. After a long fight, Philo knocks Wilson out long enough to qualify for a win. Wilson helps Philo to the hospital, then they have a drink at the Million Dollar Cowboy Bar. On their way home, Philo and the Black Widows (who are now rich) declare a truce and part amicably. Beekman, whose attempts to rig the fight for Wilson failed, cannot pay the mob bettors and is marked for death. After reaching California, Philo and Lynn are pulled over by a cop who lost money betting against Philo; he promises to endlessly harass them as punishment. Lynn calls out, "Right turn, Clyde!" Clyde knocks out the cop, and they drive away.

== Cast ==
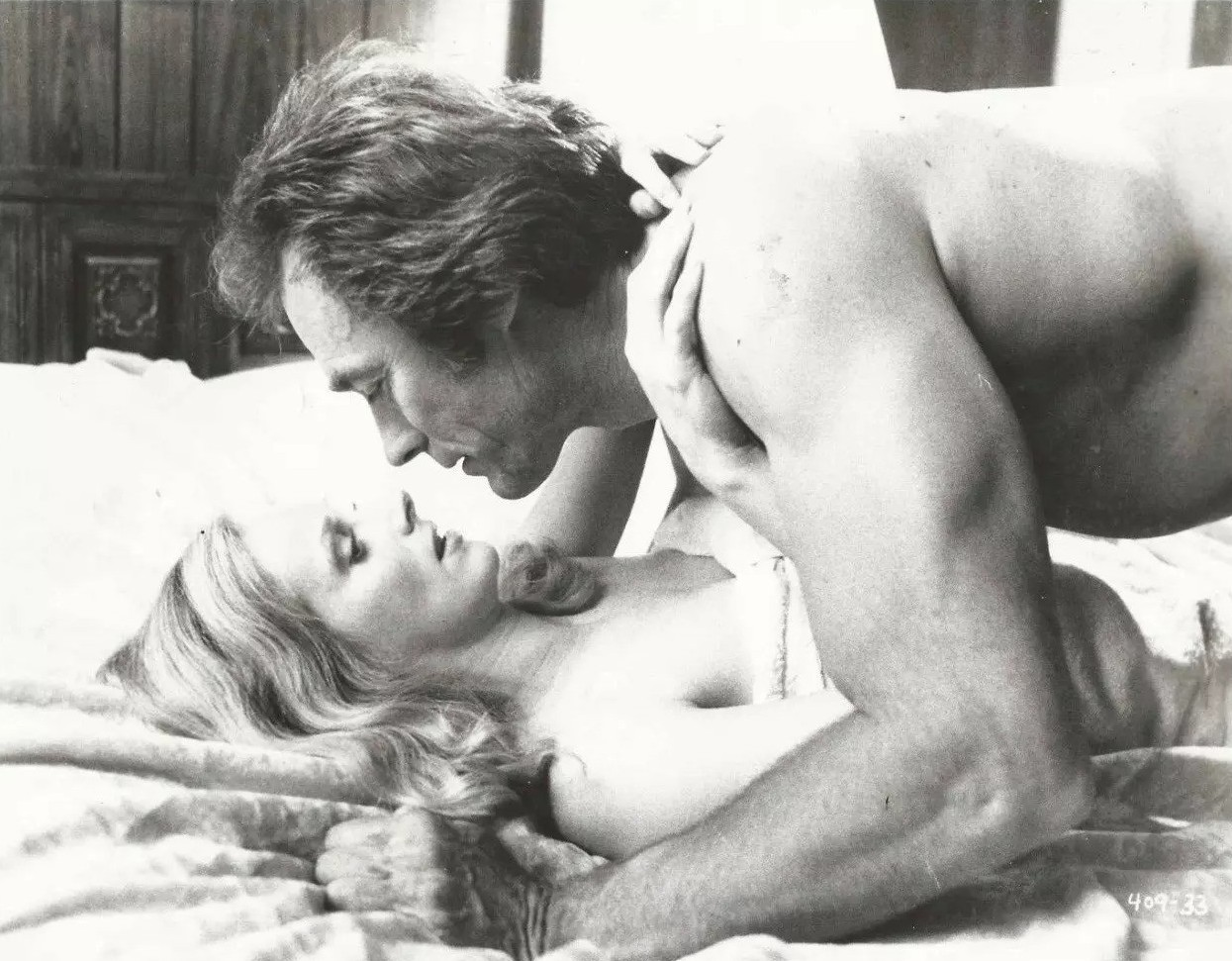
Locke and Eastwood

- Clint Eastwood as Philo Beddoe
- Sondra Locke as Lynn Halsey-Taylor
- Geoffrey Lewis as Orville Boggs
- Ruth Gordon as Senovia "Ma" Boggs
- William Smith as Jack Wilson
- Barry Corbin as Zack Tupper
- Harry Guardino as James Beekman
- Michael Cavanaugh as Patrick Scarfe
- James Gammon as the bartender
- John Quade as Cholla
- William O'Connell as Elmo
- Al Ruscio as Tony "Big Tony" Paoli Sr.
- Jack Murdock as Little Melvin
- George Murdock as Sergeant Cooley
- Dick Durock as Joe Casey
- Julie Brown as Candy
- Dan Vadis as Frank
- Camila Ashlend as Hattie
- Anne Ramsey as Loretta Quince
- Logan Ramsey as Luther Quince
- Jim Stafford as Long John
- Michael Talbott as Officer Morgan
- Mark L. Taylor as Desk Clerk
- Jack Thibeau as Head Muscle
- Charles Walker as Officer

== Production and Orangutan Death ==
Any Which Way You Can started filming in the summer of 1980. The movie was filmed in the California communities of Sun Valley, North Hollywood, and Bakersfield, and in Jackson, Wyoming.

Glen Campbell, who also made a cameo appearance in the film, performed the "Any Which Way You Can" title song in the final scene of the movie, and the song was a Top 10 hit on the country music charts.

Manis, the orangutan that played Clyde in the first film, had aged out of the role and was replaced by a younger orangutan, named Buddha. According to multiple witnesses, recounted in a book by Jane Goodall and Dale Peterson, Visions of Caliban, Buddha was badly mistreated and subsequently clubbed to death by his trainers after stealing doughnuts on the set. The book cites witnesses who stated that Buddha was badly beaten by his head trainer, who clubbed him with an axe handle, and that an autopsy after Buddha's death suggested cerebral haemorrhage. However, no action was taken against his trainers, because there were no U.S. laws requiring humane treatment of primates at the time. A substitute orangutan, C.J., was brought in after filming was completed just to do publicity, and Buddha's name was left off the film's credits. Makeup effects artist William Munns, though not a witness to the alleged events, expressed doubt regarding Buddha's poor treatment, calling Buddha's trainer one of the kindest he knew.

== Reception ==
=== Box office ===
Any Which Way You Can opened on Wednesday, December 17, 1980, and became the number one film at the U.S. box office with an opening weekend gross of $8,024,663 from a record 1,541 theatres. The following weekend, between Christmas and New Year, the film stayed at number one, grossing $10,091,105 from 1,572 theatres, a 26% increase. The Saturday was a record single day gross for a Warner Bros.' film with a gross of $3,861,561, beating the record set by Superman.

It was the 5th highest-grossing film of 1980 with a gross of $70,687,344 in the United States and Canada.

=== Critical response ===
Roger Ebert gave the film two stars out of four and opened his review by stating: "Clint Eastwood's Any Which Way You Can is not a very good movie, but it's hard not to feel a grudging affection for it. Where else, in the space of 115 minutes, can you find a country & western road picture with two fights, a bald motorcycle gang, the Mafia, a love story, a pickup truck, a tow truck, Fats Domino, a foul-mouthed octogenarian, an oversexed orangutan and a contest for the bare knuckle championship of the world?" Janet Maslin of The New York Times thought the film was "better and funnier than its predecessor," adding that "Clyde's role has been expanded this time, and Ruth Gordon's has been made smaller, all of which makes the formula much more fun." Todd McCarthy of Variety wrote, "Filled with plenty of monkey business, first half is pretty funny as these things go, but film runs out of steam after mid-way highlight ... Although overlength didn't stop 'Loose,' same flaw here is even more irritating due to protracted finale and lack of any continuing tension in Eastwood-Locke relationship." Gene Siskel of the Chicago Tribune gave the film three stars out of four and called it "a most genial Eastwood action-comedy." Kevin Thomas of the Los Angeles Times wrote, "Directed in an appropriately laid-back manner by Buddy Van Horn in his directorial debut, 'Any Which Way You Can' aspires to nothing more than entertainment. As one comedy of admittedly greater ambitions after another proves disappointing these days, 'Any Which Way You Can' (PG) is welcome as just plain fun." Gary Arnold of The Washington Post wrote, "A generous entertainment of its kind, 'Any Which Way' mixes plentiful portions of gauche, robust action and comedy with frequent musical interludes ... The weakest element in the plot is the lack of a compelling reason for Philo and Jackson to go through with their fight."

As of December 2019, the film holds a rating of 20% on the review aggregator Rotten Tomatoes based on 10 reviews, with an average rating of 4.92 out of 10.

== Soundtrack ==
The Sound Track Music From Clint Eastwood's Any Which Way You Can

Soundtrack album by Various Artists
- Released: 1980
- Genre: Country
- Labels: Viva Records (U.S.); Warner Bros. Records
- Producer: Various Artists

Singles from The Sound Track Music From Clint Eastwood's Any Which Way You Can
- 1. "You're the Reason God Made Oklahoma" Released: January 1981

=== Track listing ===
No.	Title	Writer(s)	Artist	Length
1.	"Beers to You"	Steve Dorff, John Durrill, Sandy Pinkard and Snuff Garrett	Ray Charles and Clint Eastwood	2:42
2.	"Any Which Way You Can"	Milton Brown, Steve Dorff and Snuff Garrett	Glen Campbell	3:13
3.	"You're the Reason God Made Oklahoma"	Larry Collins and Sandy Pinkard	David Frizzell and Shelly West	3:21
4.	"Whiskey Heaven"	Cliff Crofford, John Durrill and Snuff Garrett	Fats Domino	3:00
5.	"One Too Many Women in Your Life"	John Durrill and Phil Everly	Sondra Locke	2:06
6.	"Cow Patti"	Jim Stafford	Jim Stafford	3:12
7.	"Acapulco"	Larry Collins and M. Leath	Johnny Duncan	3:31
8.	"Any Way You Want Me"	Leo Offman	Gene Watson	2:49
9.	"Cotton-Eyed Clint" (Instrumental)	Adapted by Steve Dorff and Snuff Garrett	The Texas Opera Company	1:42
10.	"Orangutan Hall of Fame"	Cliff Crofford and Snuff Garrett	Cliff Crofford	1:00
11.	"Too Loose"	Milton Brown, Steve Dorff and Snuff Garrett	Sondra Locke	1:58
12.	"The Good Guys and the Bad Guys"	John Durrill and Snuff Garrett	John Durrill	2:34

=== Chart performance ===
Chart (1980)	Peak position
U.S. Billboard Top Country Albums	5
U.S. Billboard 200	141
Canadian RPM Country Albums	7

== See also ==
- List of boxing films

== Bibliography ==
- Hughes, Howard (2009). Aim for the Heart. London: I.B. Tauris. ISBN 978-1-84511-902-7.
