= Going Ape! =

1981 film by Jeremy Joe Kronsberg

- Theatrical release poster
- Directed by: Jeremy Joe Kronsberg
- Written by: Jeremy Joe Kronsberg
- Produced by: Robert L. Rosen
- Starring: Tony Danza; Bobby Berosini's Orang-Utans; Jessica Walter; Stacey Nelkin; Danny DeVito
- Cinematography: Frank V. Phillips
- Music by: Elmer Bernstein
- Production companies: Paramount Pictures; Hemdale; City Films
- Distributed by: Paramount Pictures
- Release date: April 10, 1981
- Running time: 87 minutes
- Country: United States
- Language: English
- Box office: $5,504,218

Going Ape! is a 1981 American comedy film directed by Jeremy Joe Kronsberg and produced by Paramount Pictures. The film starred Tony Danza, Danny DeVito, and three orangutans.

== Plot ==
Struggling slacker Foster Sabatini is the only member of his circus family who left the life, greatly disappointing his wealthy father Max. When Max dies, Foster and his sisters (who all hate Foster) are shocked to hear that Max left his entire estate to Foster, but only on the condition that Foster must care for his father's beloved trio of orangutans. Along with the orangutans, Foster also inherits the services of Lazlo, Max's manservant & protégé. The arrival of the orangutans and Lazlo turn Foster's life upside-down, all while he attempts to win back his disgruntled girlfriend Cynthia and impress her high-society mother Fiona.

Things are further complicated by a trio of bungling assassins hired by the local zoological society, which will inherit both the money and the orangutans if any of the apes die. Once aware of the danger to the apes, Foster and his friends must save the newly accepted primates from the assassins.

== Cast ==
- Tony Danza as Foster Sabatini
- Jessica Walter as Fiona
- Stacey Nelkin as Cynthia
- Danny DeVito as Lazlo
- Art Metrano as Joey
- Frank Sivero as Bad Habit
- Rick Hurst as Brandon
- Howard Mann as Jules Cohen
- Joseph Maher as Gridley
- Leon Askin as Zebrewski
- Ted White as Goon #1
- Bob Terhune as Goon #2
- Jaye Derkus as Goon #3
- Ellen Gerstein as Sabatini Sister
- Ruth Gillette as Marianne
- Gene LeBell as Faraday
- Gabriel Jarret as Funeral Boy
- Bobby Berosini's Orang-Utans as Rusty, Tiga, Popi

== Reception ==
The film was poorly reviewed by Janet Maslin of The New York Times, who called it a "completely unimaginative romp, standard to the point of being waxen" and referred to director Jeremy Joe Kronsberg's "messy directorial debut."

The film was nominated for a Golden Raspberry Award for Worst Supporting Actor for Danny DeVito at the 2nd Golden Raspberry Awards.

== Home video ==
The film was released on VHS in the 1980s, but was never released on DVD and remained out of print on home video for many years until it was released in January 2022 on Blu-ray.
