= Jeremy Joe Kronsberg =

American film director

- Born: circa 1938 (age 87–88); United States
- Occupations: Film producer, screenwriter, film director
- Years active: 1978–1981
- Spouse: R. Lynne (b. circa 1944)

Jeremy Joe Kronsberg is an American film director, producer and screenwriter known for his work on films such as Every Which Way but Loose, Any Which Way You Can, and Going Ape!

He is also the father of actor Gabriel Jarret.

== Filmography ==
- Every Which Way but Loose (1978)
- Any Which Way You Can (1980)
- Going Ape! (1981)
