= William O'Connell (actor) =

American actor (1929–2024)

- Born: William O'Connell; May 12, 1929; Los Angeles, California, U.S.
- Died: January 15, 2024 (aged 94); Sherman Oaks, California, U.S.
- Occupation: Actor

William O'Connell (May 12, 1929 – January 15, 2024) was an American film and television actor.

== Biography ==
O'Connell was born in Los Angeles on May 12, 1929. He served in the U.S. Army during the Korean War with the 45th Infantry Division.

O'Connell worked often with Clint Eastwood, with whom he first appeared in the 1969 musical Paint Your Wagon. In 1972, O'Connell was cast as a nervous barber in Eastwood's second directorial effort, High Plains Drifter, released the following year. In 1976, O'Connell appeared as ferryman Sim Carstairs in The Outlaw Josey Wales, also directed by Eastwood. O'Connell's other roles include portrayals in Every Which Way but Loose and its sequel Any Which Way You Can, where he played a member of a comically inept biker gang constantly being outmatched by Eastwood.

In addition to his film career, O'Connell was very active on TV throughout the 1960s and '70s, appearing in about 50 different roles on such series such as Star Trek, Rawhide, Petticoat Junction, Dennis the Menace and Quincy, M.E.

== Death ==
O'Connell died at his home in Sherman Oaks, California, on January 15, 2024, at the age of 94.

== Selected filmography ==
- 20,000 Eyes (1961) – Appraiser (uncredited)
- Womanhunt (1962)
- The Wheeler Dealers (1963) – Paid Weeper (uncredited)
- Dennis the Menace (1963) - Senate secretary (uncredited)
- The Outer Limits (1964) (Season 1 episode "The Chameleon" - Creature
- Alfred Hitchcock Presents (1965) (Season 3 Episode 29: "Off Season") - Art Summers
- The War Lord (1965) – Volunteer rejected by Chrysagon (uncredited)
- Do Not Disturb (1965) – Cecil Graves (uncredited)
- Way... Way Out (1966) – Ponsonby
- It's a Bikini World (1967) – McSnigg
- The Big Mouth (1967) – Psychiatrist (uncredited)
- Games (1967) – Party Guest #1
- Star Trek, in "Journey to Babel" (1967, TV series) – Thelev
- Petticoat Junction, in "All Sales Final" (1967, TV series) – Mr. Agnew
- The Sweet Ride (1968) – Beach Resident (uncredited)
- Ice Station Zebra (1968) – Survivor
- Hook, Line & Sinker (1969) – Hotel Clerk (uncredited)
- Paint Your Wagon (1969) – Horace Tabor
- The Happy Ending (1969) – Minister
- Green Acres, in "A Tale of a Tail" (1969, TV series) – Hotel Clerk
- Which Way to the Front? (1970) – Mr. Prescott (uncredited)
- Scandalous John (1971) – Men's Store Clerk
- The Culpepper Cattle Co. (1972) – Bartender in Piercetown
- High Plains Drifter (1973) – the Barber
- Black Eye (1974) – Minister
- Big Bad Mama (1974) – Crusade Preacher
- The Outlaw Josey Wales (1976) – Sim Carstairs
- Every Which Way but Loose (1978) – Elmo (Black Widow)
- Any Which Way You Can (1980) – Elmo (Black Widow)
- Stewardess School (1986) – Attorney
