= Every Which Way but Loose =

1978 film by James Fargo

- Theatrical release poster by Bob Peak
- Directed by: James Fargo
- Written by: Jeremy Joe Kronsberg
- Produced by: Robert Daley
- Starring: Clint Eastwood; Sondra Locke; Geoffrey Lewis; Beverly D'Angelo; Ruth Gordon
- Cinematography: Rexford L. Metz
- Edited by: Joel Cox; Ferris Webster
- Music by: Steve Dorff
- Production company: The Malpaso Company
- Distributed by: Warner Bros.
- Release date: December 20, 1978
- Running time: 114 minutes
- Country: United States
- Language: English
- Budget: $5 million
- Box office: $104.3 million

Every Which Way but Loose is a 1978 American action comedy film released by Warner Bros. starring Clint Eastwood in an uncharacteristic and offbeat comedy role. It was produced by Robert Daley and directed by James Fargo. Eastwood plays Philo Beddoe, a trucker and bare-knuckle brawler roaming the American West in search of a lost love while accompanied by his brother/manager Orville and his pet orangutan Clyde. Philo encounters a wide assortment of characters, including a pair of police officers and a motorcycle gang who pursue him for revenge.

Eastwood's appearance in the film, after his string of Spaghetti Western and Dirty Harry roles, somewhat startled the film industry, and he was reportedly advised against taking the role. Although it was poorly reviewed by critics, the film proved successful and became, along with its 1980 sequel Any Which Way You Can, two of the highest-grossing Eastwood films. When adjusted for inflation, it ranks as one of the top 250 highest-grossing films of all time.

== Plot ==
Philo Beddoe is a truck driver living in the San Fernando Valley. He lives in a small house, with an orangutan named Clyde, behind that of his best friend, Orville Boggs, and his mother. Philo makes money on the side as a bare-knuckle fighter; he is often compared to a legendary fighter named Tank Murdock.

One night Philo becomes smitten with Lynn Halsey-Taylor, an aspiring country music singer he meets at the Palomino Club, a local honky-tonk. His relationship with her seems to be going well until one day she and her camper disappear from the trailer park. Believing that he is falling for her, Philo decides to set off for Lynn's home in Denver, Colorado.

Along the way, he has a run-in with a motorcycle gang called the Black Widows, who incur Philo's wrath after two gang members insult him and Clyde at a traffic light. Philo chases them down and takes their bikes (which he repaints, repairs, and resells), and every attempt they make to get even results in disaster. Philo also incurs the wrath of an LAPD cop named Putnam, with whom he gets into a fight at the Palomino. Both the officer and the Widows learn of Philo's trip to Colorado and head off to find him.

Orville and Clyde accompany Philo to Denver, and on the way, they meet a woman named Echo who becomes Orville's girlfriend. They earn money along the way by booking fights for Philo. After a fight in a slaughterhouse, the man holding the money tries to stiff Philo. Echo fires two shots from a .38, dead center into a side of beef. She lets the crowd know she knows how to shoot, saying, "The second shot was to let you know the first was no accident." The man hands over the money.

Knowing that Philo has come to look for her, Lynn helps the Black Widows lure him into a trap. Philo sees Lynn and attempts to talk to her but finds himself surrounded by the Black Widows. He manages to fight most of them until Orville intervenes. Using a garbage truck with a dumpster hoist, he dumps all the motorcycles into the back of the truck. The Widows charge the garbage truck, but Orville gets away. Philo, Echo, and Orville then escape.

Philo finally finds Lynn and she reveals her shallow nature to him. Hurt by her callousness, Philo says that he is the only one dumb enough to want to take her further than her bed. Philo watches as Lynn erupts in a fit of rage, striking him repeatedly until she collapses in tears.

Orville learns that Tank Murdock, based in the area, is ready to retire after one more fight. Orville makes the arrangements, and Philo faces his aging nemesis. During the fight, the crowd, initially pro-Murdock, begins to insult him, with some murmurs that Philo is going to be the next Murdock. Philo lets his guard down, intentionally giving Murdock a clear shot which knocks Philo down for the count, though Philo winks at Orville to let him know he is throwing the fight. Murdock, having regained the crowd's esteem, is allowed to retire undefeated, although he knows Philo let him win. Clyde, Orville, and Echo head home the next day.

== Cast ==
- Clint Eastwood as Philo Beddoe
- Sondra Locke as Lynn Halsey-Taylor
- Manis as Clyde
- Geoffrey Lewis as Orville
- Beverly D'Angelo as Echo
- Ruth Gordon as Ma
- Walter Barnes as Tank Murdock
- George Chandler as D.M.V. Clerk
- Sam Gilman as Fat Man's Friend
- Roy Jenson as Woody, Secretary Biker
- James McEachin as Herb
- Bill McKinney as Dallas, Treasurer Biker
- William O'Connell as Elmo, Sergeant-at-Arms Biker
- John Quade as Cholla, the Biker Leader
- Dan Vadis as Frank, Assistant Head Biker
- George P. Wilbur as Church
- Gregory Walcott as Putnam
- Hank Worden as Trailer Court Manager
- Thomas Rosales Jr. as Truck Driver

Screenwriter Jeremy Kronsberg has a small role as Bruno the biker, while martial artist Gene LeBell also features as another biker. Making uncredited appearances are Mel Tillis as emcee/performer at the Palomino honkytonk club and Phil Everly as a singer at the club.

== Production ==
The script, written by Jeremy Joe Kronsberg, had been rejected by many other Hollywood production companies. However, Eastwood saw the project as a means of broadening his appeal to the public, although most of his production team and his agents reportedly thought it was ill-advised. Eastwood's associate Bob Hoyt convinced Warner Bros. to buy the story.

The Clyde character was played by an orangutan named Manis. Eastwood said of using the orangutan for the main role, "Clyde was one of the most natural actors I ever worked with! But you had to get him on the first take because his boredom level was very limited."

The film has a contemporary Western theme, displaying the blue-collar aspects of the Western United States, with many scenes shot in rural locations, cheap motel rooms, industrial facilities, and honkytonk bars. Location filming took place in the California communities of Bakersfield, North Hollywood, San Fernando, Sun Valley, Ukiah, and Van Nuys. It was also filmed in Colorado, including parts of Denver, Aurora, and historic Georgetown. A few scenes were also filmed in Albuquerque, Santa Fe, and Taos, New Mexico.

== Title and theme song origin ==
The film's title was the basis of the Eddie Rabbitt song of the same name from the soundtrack.

In California in 1978, songwriter Steve Dorff received a phone call from Snuff Garrett, the music supervisor of the Clint Eastwood film Every Which Way But Loose. Dorff later said in an interview that Garrett said to him, "Hey, what's up? I need you to write something. I need a song called 'Every Which Way But Loose.' I said, "What does that mean?" He said, "I don't know. I just know that Clint Eastwood plays a guy who likes to beat people up, and he travels around in an old beat-up pickup truck with an orangutan." Dorff then called his friend in Alabama, Milton Brown, and over the phone, in about 30 minutes they had put together the song.

The phrase had also appeared in the previous year's film Smokey and the Bandit.

== Reception ==
=== Box-office performance ===
Upon its release, the film was a surprising success and became Eastwood's most commercially successful film at the time. The film opened in 1,275 theatres and grossed $10,272,294 in its first week, beating Eastwood's previous best opener, The Enforcer.

It grossed a total of $104.3 million in the United States and Canada, over $500 million when adjusted for inflation, ranking high among those of Eastwood's career, and was the fourth-highest-grossing film of 1978.

=== Critical response ===
Critical reviews were uniformly negative: Janet Maslin of The New York Times called the film "the slackest and most harebrained of Mr. Eastwood's recent movies. It's overlong and virtually uneventful, even though there are half a dozen cute characters and woolly subplots competing for the viewer's attentions". Variety commented: "This film is so awful it's almost as if Eastwood is using it to find out how far he can go—how bad a film he can associate himself with". Gene Siskel of the Chicago Tribune awarded 2.5 stars out of 4 and wrote that the comedy "breaks new ground" for Eastwood, but the film "has been sloppily made. Its villains are pathetic cartoon characters; its seemingly-sweet leading lady turns out to be a psychotic. These errors cripple what could have been an extremely entertaining story". Charles Champlin of the Los Angeles Times called it "a slapdash, slapstick comedy" that "pushes all the right buttons" for audiences but "lacks both the urgency and the emotional satisfactions of Eastwood's angrier films". Gary Arnold of The Washington Post wrote: "Eastwood must have thought of his blundering new vehicle, Every Which Way but Loose, as a change of pace, designed to align his career in a direction similar to that of Burt Reynolds. Casual, knockabout farce seems to be the general idea, but perhaps Eastwood should have borrowed the director and writers who helped shape Smokey and the Bandit and Hooper for Reynolds. Every Which Way but Loose certainly isn't loose. It's a sluggish shambles". David Ansen of Newsweek wrote: "One can forgive the orangutan's participation—he couldn't read the script—but what is Eastwood's excuse? That a star with his power in Hollywood would choose to litter the screen with this plotless junk heap of moronic gags, sour romance and fatuous fisticuffs can be taken either as an expression of contempt for his huge audience or as an act of masochism".

As of August 2023, it holds a rating of 41% on review aggregator Rotten Tomatoes based on 27 reviews, with an average rating of 5.0/10. The website's critical consensus reads: "The inexplicable pairing of Clint Eastwood with an orangutan is the least of Every Which Way But Loose's problems—a slack action-comedy with a haphazardly assembled story".

== Soundtrack ==
The soundtrack album included many successful country music hits, and two of its songs reached No. 1 on the Billboard Hot Country Singles chart in 1979: the title track "Every Which Way but Loose" by Eddie Rabbitt and "Coca-Cola Cowboy" by Mel Tillis; also included was "Behind Closed Doors" by Charlie Rich, which had reached the No. 1 spot on the Hot Country Singles chart in 1973. Other songs featured in the film that reached the Top 5 of the country chart included Rich's "I'll Wake You Up When I Get Home" (No. 3) and Tillis's "Send Me Down to Tucson" (No. 2).

Producer Snuff Garrett was hired to produce songs for the film, including three for Sondra Locke's character, although this proved problematic as Locke was not a professional singer. Locke, who appears as Eastwood's love interest, performs several musical numbers in the film as well.

In addition to "Behind Closed Doors", a 1960 song by Hank Thompson, "A Six Pack to Go" was featured in the film and included on the soundtrack.

=== Charts ===
Chart (1979)	Position
Australia (Kent Music Report)	87

Billboard 200 #78

== See also ==
- List of boxing films

== Bibliography ==
- Hughes, Howard (2009). Aim for the Heart. London: I.B. Tauris. ISBN 978-1-84511-902-7.
- McGilligan, Patrick (1999). Clint: The Life and Legend. London: HarperCollins. ISBN 0-00-638354-8.
- Munn, Michael (1992). Clint Eastwood: Hollywood's Loner. London: Robson Books. ISBN 0-86051-790-X.
- Schickel, Richard (1996). Clint Eastwood: A Biography. New York: Knopf. ISBN 978-0679429746.
