= John Quade =

American actor

- John Quade as Cholla in Every Which Way but Loose
- Born: John William Saunders III; April 1, 1938; Kansas City, Kansas, U.S.
- Died: August 9, 2009 (aged 71); Rosamond, California, U.S.
- Occupations: Film, television actor
- Years active: 1968–93
- Spouse: Gwendolyn Rice (1970-2009) (his death)

John William Saunders III (April 1, 1938 – August 9, 2009), better known by the stage name John Quade, was an American character actor who starred in film and in television. He was best known for his role as Cholla, the leader of the motorcycle gang the Black Widows in the Clint Eastwood films Every Which Way but Loose (1978) and its sequel Any Which Way You Can (1980).

== Early life ==
Born in Kansas City, Kansas, Quade attended Perry Rural High School in Perry, Kansas before transferring to Highland Park High School in Topeka on September 7, 1954. While at Highland Park, he was a football tackle and also participated in basketball and track. He was a member of the Stamp, Radio, and Chess/Checkers clubs. He graduated from Highland Park in May 1956.

Quade attended Washburn University in the fall semester of 1956. He worked for the Santa Fe Railway repair shop in Topeka. Quade met an engineer building missile silos in Kansas, which led to a job in California working at the Jet Propulsion Laboratory as an aerospace engineer. Some of the parts Quade constructed are still on the moon. While at a restaurant in Pasadena, a talent scout from the movie industry approached Quade to ask if he had ever done any acting.

== Acting career ==
Quade began acting on TV in 1968 with a part on the TV show Bonanza, and made his first film in 1972. Due to Quade's gruff look, he usually played roles as a brutish villain or ruthless authority figure. He appeared opposite Clint Eastwood in High Plains Drifter, The Outlaw Josey Wales, Every Which Way but Loose, and Any Which Way You Can. Quade's wife stated that, "Clint hired him for his face and told him afterward that he felt like he got a bonus because John could act." He appeared in Papillon with Steve McQueen and Dustin Hoffman. He played the role of Sheriff Briggs in the mini-series Roots and was in the 1986 western mini-series Dream West. Quade starred in two short-lived television series, Flatbush (1979) and Lucky Luke (1992).

He made many guest appearances on television shows ranging from Kojak, Bonanza, Gunsmoke, Starsky & Hutch, Vega$, The Rockford Files, Bionic Woman, The Dukes Of Hazzard (in the episode "Hazzard Connection"), Knight Rider (in the pilot episode "Knight of the Phoenix"), Buck Rogers in the 25th Century (in the two-part episode "The Plot to Kill a City" as Quince, a telekinetic supervillain), Galactica 1980 (in the two-part episode "The Super Scouts" as the town sheriff), The A-Team (in the episodes "There's Always A Catch" and "Skins") and On the Air, to TV miniseries such as Roots, Dream West and Return to Lonesome Dove.

== Death ==
On August 9, 2009, John Quade died at his home in Rosamond, California, at the age of 71 due to a heart attack while sleeping.

== Selected filmography ==
- Melinda (1972) as Cop (uncredited)
- Hammer (1972) as Riley
- Bad Company (1972) as Nolan
- Goodnight, My Love (1972) as Edgar
- Deadhead Miles (1972) as Spud Holder
- High Plains Drifter (1973) as Jake Ross
- Brother on the Run (1973) as 'Fatback' - Hit Man
- The Blue Knight (1973) as Knobby Booker
- Papillon (1973) as Masked Breton
- The Sting (1973) as Riley
- Planet Earth (1974) as Kreeg Commandant
- The Swinging Cheerleaders (1974) as Belski
- Mr. Ricco (1975) as Arkansas
- Rancho Deluxe (1975) as Circular Face (uncredited)
- 92 in the Shade (1975) as Roy
- The Last Hard Men (1976) as Gant
- The Outlaw Josey Wales (1976) as Comanchero Leader
- Special Delivery (1976) as Barney
- Roots (1977, TV Mini-Series) as Sheriff Biggs
- Night Terror (1977) as the Derelict
- Peter Lundy and the Medicine Hat Stallion (1977) as Adam
- The Ghost of Flight 401 (1978) as Marshall
- Every Which Way but Loose (1978) as Cholla (Black Widows Leader)
- Buck Rogers in the 25th Century (1979, TV Series) as Jolen Quince (two episodes)
- Any Which Way You Can (1980) as Cholla (Black Widows Leader)
- Galactica 1980 (1980, TV Series) as Sheriff
- Cattle Annie and Little Britches (1981) as Morgan
- No Man's Land (1984) as Henry Lambert
- Fury to Freedom (1985) as Mr. Ries
- The B.R.A.T. Patrol (1986) as 'Knife'
- Gone to Texas (1986) as Senator William Stansbury
- La Bamba (1987) as Bartender
- Tigershark (1987) as 'Cowboy' Dave Reynolds
- The Tracker (1988) as Lomax (outlaw)
- The Giant of Thunder Mountain (1991) as Carl (Townsman)
- And You Thought Your Parents Were Weird (1991) as Walter Kotzwinkle
