= Manis (orangutan) =

Orangutan that played Clyde in the 1978 movie Every Which Way But Loose

- Species: Orangutan
- Sex: Male
- Born: May 31, 1964
- Occupation: Animal actor
- Known for: Clint Eastwood's sidekick in Every Which Way but Loose (1978 film)

Manis was a trained orangutan that played Clyde, Clint Eastwood's sidekick in the 1978 box office hit Every Which Way but Loose. The 1980 sequel, Any Which Way You Can, did not feature Manis, as the "child actor" had grown too much between productions. In the sequel, two orangutans, C.J. and Buddha, shared the role. Manis also starred in the 1981 comedy "Going Ape" with Tony Danza & Danny Devito, as well as the 1983 action comedy film Cannonball Run II as the 'limo driver'. He also guest starred in an episode of television show Silver Spoons titled "The Great Halloween Caper" (Season 1, Episode 8).

== Controversy ==
In a documentary produced by People for the Ethical Treatment of Animals (PETA), it was alleged, never proven, that Manis was beaten on the set by his trainer to keep him docile. The trainer would spray mace in his face and then beat him with an iron pipe wrapped in newspaper. The source for this information was Visions of Caliban, a book by Dale Peterson and Jane Goodall, but PETA referred to the wrong animal. Peterson and Goodall actually refer not to Manis but to Buddha, the orangutan used in the second film (Any Which Way You Can).

The book cites witnesses who stated that Buddha was badly beaten by his head trainer, who clubbed him with an axe handle, and that an autopsy after his death suggested cerebral hemorrhage. Buddha's crime was stealing doughnuts from the craft service table. The book states that a second orangutan, Clyde Junior or C.J., was brought in to do publicity in the wake of Buddha's death. Makeup effects artist William Munns, though not witness to the events, expressed significant doubts regarding Buddha's allegedly poor treatment.

Manis returned to working with his trainers' act in Las Vegas.
