= Frank Stanley (cinematographer) =

American cinematographer

Frank Walter Stanley
- Born: May 5, 1922; New York City, New York, U.S.
- Died: December 21, 1999 (aged 77); Sarasota, Florida, U.S.
- Resting place: Florida National Cemetery
- Occupation: Cinematographer

Frank Walter Stanley (May 5, 1922 – December 21, 1999) was an American cinematographer. He is best known for four Clint Eastwood films in a row: Breezy (1973), Magnum Force (1973), Thunderbolt and Lightfoot (1974) and The Eiger Sanction (1975).

== Career ==
During the filming of The Eiger Sanction, shot in Switzerland, which required a great deal of precarious mountain-climbing cinematography, Stanley fell during the shoot but survived. He used a wheelchair for some time and was taken out of action. Stanley, who later managed to complete filming after a delay under pressure from an unsympathetic Clint Eastwood, would later blame Eastwood for the accident due to a lack of preparation, describing him both as a director and an actor as "a very impatient man who doesn't really plan his pictures or do any homework. He figures he can go right in and sail through these things". Stanley was never hired by Eastwood or Malpaso Productions again. Bruce Surtees was Eastwood's regular cinematographer before and after this period, on a total of twelve films.

Later Stanley was the cinematographer on Blake Edwards's 10 (1979) and Grease 2 (1982).

== Filmography ==
Director of photography

=== Film ===
Year	Film	Director	Notes
1971	J. W. Coop	Cliff Robertson	
1972	The Carey Treatment	Blake Edwards	Fourth collaboration with Blake Edwards
1972	A Separate Peace	Larry Peerce	Second collaboration with Larry Peerce
1973	Tom Sawyer	Don Taylor	
1973	Breezy	Clint Eastwood	Second collaboration with Clint Eastwood
1973	Magnum Force	Ted Post	
1973	Willie Dynamite	Gilbert Moses	First collaboration with Gilbert Moses
1974	Thunderbolt and Lightfoot	Michael Cimino	
1975	Mr. Ricco	Paul Bogart	
1975	The Eiger Sanction	Clint Eastwood	Third collaboration with Clint Eastwood
1976	Car Wash	Michael Schultz	
1977	Heroes	Jeremy Kagan	First collaboration with Jeremy Kagan
1977	A Hero Ain't Nothin' but a Sandwich	Ralph Nelson	
1978	Corvette Summer	Matthew Robbins	
1978	The Big Fix	Jeremy Kagan	Second collaboration with Jeremy Kagan
1979	10	Blake Edwards	Fifth collaboration with Blake Edwards
1979	The Fish That Saved Pittsburgh	Gilbert Moses	Second collaboration with Gilbert Moses
1980	Wholly Moses!	Gary Weis	
1981	Under the Rainbow	Steve Rash	
1982	Grease 2	Patricia Birch	
1983	The Prodigal	James F. Collier	

Camera and electrical department

Year	Film	Director	Role	Notes	Other notes
1962	Hatari!	Howard Hawks	Assistant camera	First collaboration with Howard Hawks	Uncredited
1962	To Kill a Mockingbird	Robert Mulligan	Assistant camera	First collaboration with Robert Mulligan	Uncredited
1963	A Gathering of Eagles	Delbert Mann	Assistant camera		Uncredited
1964	Man's Favorite Sport?	Howard Hawks	First assistant camera	Second collaboration with Howard Hawks	Uncredited
1965	The Great Race	Blake Edwards	First assistant camera	First collaboration with Blake Edwards	Uncredited
1966	Hawaii	George Roy Hill	First assistant camera	First collaboration with George Roy Hill	
1967	Tobruk	Arthur Hiller	First assistant camera		Uncredited
1967	Thoroughly Modern Millie	George Roy Hill	First assistant camera	Second collaboration with George Roy Hill	Uncredited
1968	The Green Berets	John Wayne; Ray Kellogg	Camera operator		Uncredited
1969	A Time for Dying	Budd Boetticher	First assistant camera		
1970	The Grasshopper	Jerry Paris	First assistant camera		
1970	Darling Lili	Blake Edwards	First assistant camera	Second collaboration with Blake Edwards	
1971	The Beguiled	Don Siegel	Assistant camera		Uncredited
1971	Raid on Rommel	Henry Hathaway	Assistant camera		Uncredited
1971	The Sporting Club	Larry Peerce	Assistant camera	First collaboration with Larry Peerce	
1971	Summer of '42	Robert Mulligan	First assistant camera	Second collaboration with Robert Mulligan	Uncredited
1971	Wild Rovers	Blake Edwards	Photographer: Second unit	Third collaboration with Blake Edwards	
1971	Play Misty for Me	Clint Eastwood	Assistant camera	First collaboration with Clint Eastwood	Uncredited
1977	Close Encounters of the Third Kind	Steven Spielberg	Additional director of photography	First collaboration with Steven Spielberg	Uncredited
1979	1941	Steven Spielberg	Additional director of photography	Second collaboration with Steven Spielberg	

=== TV movies ===
Year	Film	Director
1974	Winter Kill	Jud Taylor
1975	Katherine	Jeremy Kagan
1976	James Dean	Robert Butler
1976	Return to Earth	Jud Taylor
1976	Nightmare in Badham County	John Llewellyn Moxey
1976	I Want to Keep My Baby!	Jerry Thorpe
1977	The Strange Possession of Mrs. Oliver	Gordon Hessler
1977	Snowbeast	Herb Wallerstein
1978	When Every Day Was the Fourth of July	Dan Curtis
1979	The Last Ride of the Dalton Gang	Dan Curtis
1981	East of Eden	Harvey Hart
1981	The Other Victim	Noel Black
1982	Cry for the Strangers	Peter Medak
1983	Wait till Your Mother Gets Home!	Bill Persky
1983	Secrets of a Mother and Daughter	Gabrielle Beaumont
1983	Heart of Steel	Donald Wrye
1984	Dark Mirror	Richard Lang
1984	Passions	Sandor Stern
1984	The Three Wishes of Billy Grier	Corey Blechman
1985	Consenting Adult	Gilbert Cates
1985	Love, Mary	Robert Day

=== TV series ===
Year	Title	Notes
1981	East of Eden	3 episodes

== Bibliography ==
- McGilligan, Patrick (1999). Clint: The Life and Legend. HarperCollins. ISBN 0-00-638354-8.
