= Secrets of Three Hungry Wives =

- Genre: Drama; thriller
- Written by: Jo Heims
- Directed by: Gordon Hessler
- Starring: Jessica Walter; Gretchen Corbett; Eve Plumb
- Music by: John Carl Parker
- Country of origin: United States
- Original language: English

Production
- Executive producers: Florence Small; Alan Surgal
- Producer: Robert A. Papazian
- Cinematography: William Cronjager
- Editor: Gary Griffen
- Running time: 120 min.
- Production companies: Penthouse Productions (as Penthouse Productions, Inc. Cine Guarantors Inc.

Original release
- Network: NBC
- Release: October 9, 1978

Secrets of Three Hungry Wives is a 1978 American television thriller film directed by Gordon Hessler, and starring Jessica Walter, Gretchen Corbett, Eve Plumb, and Heather MacRae. It was one of the later scripts written by Jo Heims prior to her death from breast cancer. Alan Surgal finished the script.

== Plot ==
Three married women become suspects when a man they all had an affair with is murdered.

== Cast ==
- Jessica Walter as Christina Wood
- Gretchen Corbett as Karen McClure
- Eve Plumb as Vicki Wood
- Heather MacRae as Lynn Briskin
- James Franciscus as Mark Powers
- Craig Stevens as Bill McClure
- Raymond St. Jacques as Detective Inspector George Dunbar

== Reception ==
Kevin Thomas of the Los Angeles Times said the film "offers compassionate comment, not social criticism, along with its supense."
