= Paul Gillette =

American wine expert and writer

- Born: October 1, 1938; Carbondale, Pennsylvania, U.S.
- Died: January 6, 1996 (aged 57); Los Angeles, California, U.S.
- Education: Pennsylvania State University
- Occupations: Writer, wine expert
- Spouse: Shelly Gillette
- Children: 2

Paul J. Gillette (October 1, 1938 – January 6, 1996) was an American wine expert and writer. He was among the first to host a nationally syndicated television show on wine appreciation, Enjoying Wine with Paul Gillette. He was also known for writing the novelization of the Clint Eastwood film Play Misty For Me, based on the script by Jo Heims and Dean Reisner.

== Writings ==
=== Screenplays and novelizations ===
- The Lopison Case (1967)
- Play Misty for Me (1971)
- Cat o' Nine Tails (1972), filmed as The Cat o' Nine Tails
- Carmela (1972)
- One of the Crowd (1980)
- The Chinese Godfather (1981)

=== Non-fiction ===
- Inside Ku Klux Klan (1965)
- Playboy's Book of Wine (1974)
- Enjoying Wine (1976)

== Television ==
- Camera Three (as writer and occasional host)
- Enjoying Wine With Paul Gillette (PBS, 1974)
