= The Sardine Factory =

Restaurant in Monterey, California

Coordinates: 36.615706°N 121.901584°W

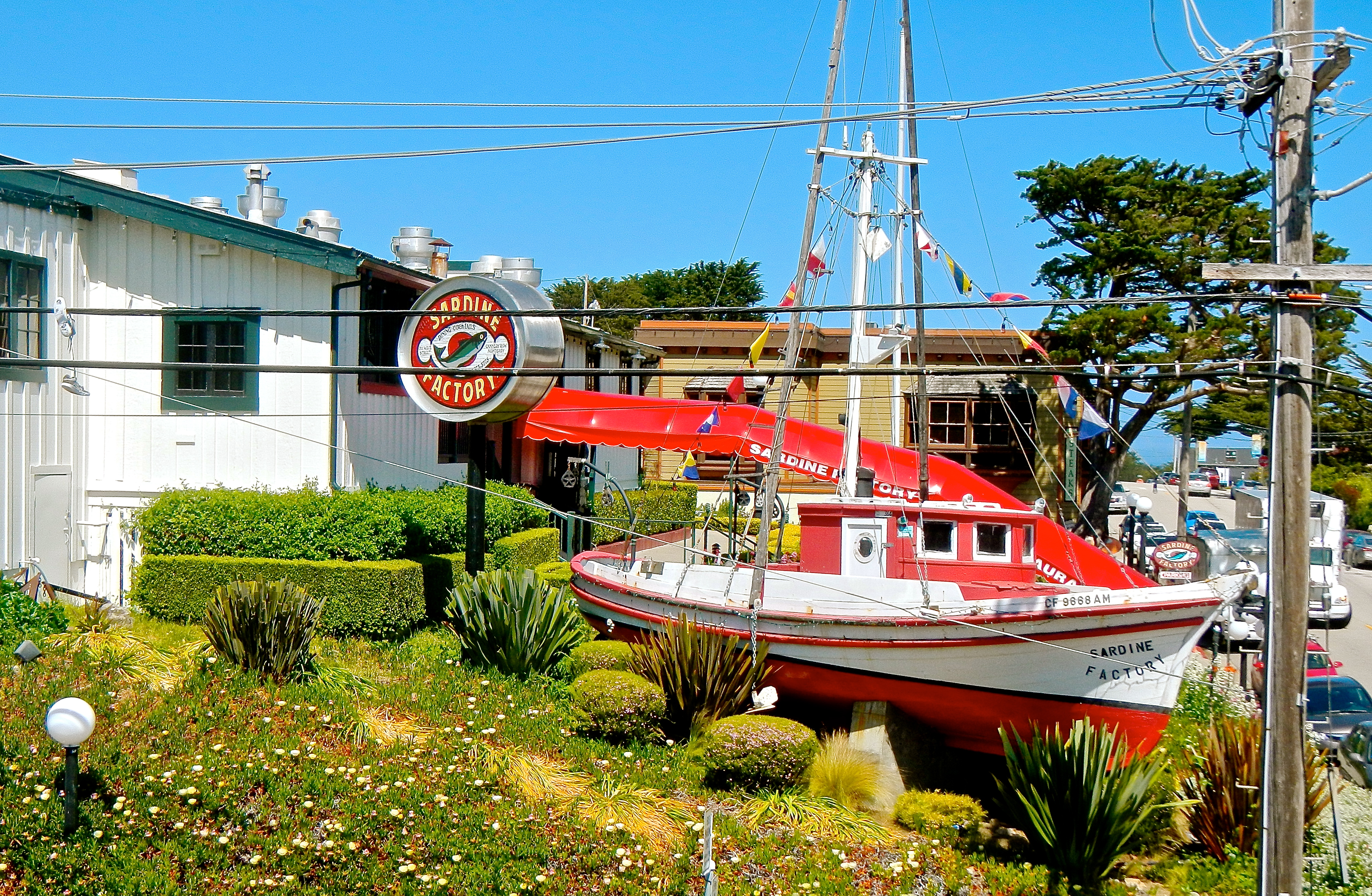
The Sardine Factory

The Sardine Factory is a seafood restaurant in Monterey, California.

== History ==
Chef Bert Cutino met entrepreneur Ted Balestreri while they were both college students. Both had grown up in Monterey and together decided to convert one of the many empty canneries into a restaurant. The restaurant opened October 2, 1968.

In 1980, The Sardine Factory was one of 50 American restaurants invited to contribute a dish (abalone bisque) to Ronald Reagan's presidential inauguration. They served again at the inauguration of George H. W. Bush.

The Sardine Factory was likely the first restaurant in Monterey to serve spot prawns (known locally as Monterey Bay spot prawns though they range from San Diego to Alaska). When Cutino was approached about purchasing them, he was skeptical as his father had been a local fisherman and yet he was utterly unfamiliar with them. They may have escaped being fished so long as they live so deep under the surface. They have since become standard fare in many Monterey restaurants.

== Awards and recognition ==
The restaurant has frequently been awarded for its wine list, including Restaurant Hospitality Magazine's "Best Wine List in America."

== In popular culture ==
Several scenes from Clint Eastwood’s Play Misty for Me were filmed at the bar.

== See also ==
- Cannery Row
- Play Misty For Me
