= Navajo Run =

1964 film

- Directed by: Johnny Seven
- Screenplay by: Jo Heims
- Produced by: Johnny Seven
- Starring: Johnny Seven; Warren J. Kemmerling; Virginia Vincent; Ron Soble
- Cinematography: Gregory Sandor
- Edited by: Lee Gilbert
- Music by: Emil Cadkin; William Loose
- Production company: LoraJon Productions
- Distributed by: American International Pictures (US)
- Release date: November 25, 1964
- Running time: 75 minutes
- Country: United States
- Language: English

Navajo Run is a 1964 Western film released by American International Pictures, produced and directed by as well as starring Johnny Seven.

== Cast ==
- Johnny Seven as Mathew Whitehawk
- Warren J. Kemmerling as Luke Grog
- Virginia Vincent as Sarah Grog
- Ron Soble as Jesse Grog

== Plot summary ==
Mathew Whitehawk, a "half-breed Navajo," is bitten by a rattlesnake and seeks aid at the ranch of Sarah and Luke Grog. Mathew is nursed back to health on the orders of Luke. It turns out that Luke hates Native Americans. He sets Mathew loose in the forest without food or water, and hunts him down as he has done with other Native Americans. The film ends with Mathew killing Luke.

== Legacy ==
American International Pictures: A Comprehensive Filmography describes Navajo Run as an "obscure little curio" that was a retelling of The Most Dangerous Game with a "white racist hunting down Indians as a hobby." The film had little impact at the time of its limited release, and after theatrical showings it was shown on TV in Canada.
