= Heather MacRae =

American actress (born 1946)

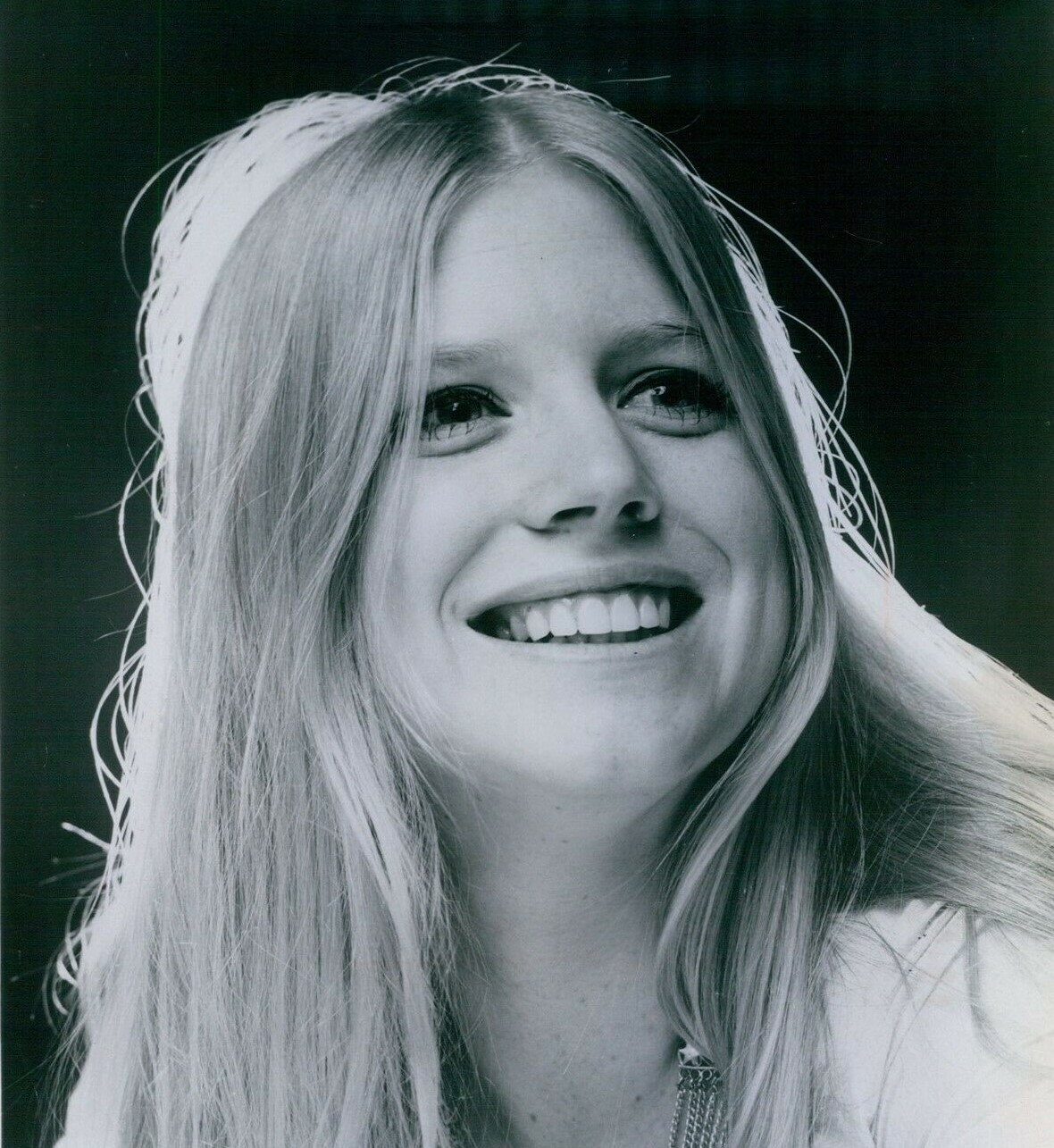
- MacRae in Hair, 1970
- Born: October 5, 1946 (age 79); New York City, U.S.
- Occupation: Actress
- Years active: 1966–present
- Parents: Gordon MacRae (father); Sheila MacRae (mother)
- Relatives: Meredith MacRae (sister)

Heather MacRae (born October 5, 1946) is an American actress known for her role in the Woody Allen 1972 comedy Everything You Always Wanted to Know About Sex* (*But Were Afraid to Ask).

== Early years ==
MacRae is the daughter of motion picture, stage, and television stars Sheila MacRae and Gordon MacRae. Meredith MacRae was her sister, and she has two brothers, Bruce and Gar.

She studied at the University of Colorado but left academics to pursue a career in show business.

== Career ==
MacRae's film career included roles in Everything You Always Wanted to Know About Sex* (*But Were Afraid to Ask) (1972), The Connection (1973), Bang the Drum Slowly (1973), Secrets of Three Hungry Wives (1978) and Life with Mikey (1993). She also appeared in a singing role in Robert Altman's 1979 film A Perfect Couple. She also appeared in several television roles, including parts in Starsky and Hutch, Frasier, and The Sopranos and as the judge who marries Miranda and Steve in an outdoor ceremony on Sex and the City. She has played continuing roles on the daytime serials The Best of Everything and One Life to Live.

A veteran of the Broadway stage, she has appeared in Hair, A Catered Affair, and Falsettos.

In 1983, MacRae and her mother had a cabaret act at the Inner Circle in New York City. A review in The New York Times called the two "the oddest cabaret couple", noting that their styles of entertainment differed and that they alternated in the spotlight rather than performing together. MacRae performed a solo cabaret show, Songs of My Father, in Chicago in 1999. In it, she sang songs associated with her father and told about his experiences in music.
