= Jo Heims =

American screenwriter

- Born: Joyce Heims; January 15, 1930; Philadelphia, Pennsylvania, US
- Died: April 22, 1978 (aged 48); Los Angeles, California, US
- Occupation: Screenwriter
- Years active: 1958–1978
- Notable work: The Girl in Lovers Lane; The Devil's Hand; Play Misty for Me; Breezy
- Spouse: William Duffy (1972–1978; her death)

Joyce Heims (January 15, 1930 – April 22, 1978) was an American screenwriter best known for her collaborations with actor-director Clint Eastwood. Born in Philadelphia, Heims moved out to the US west coast in early adulthood. She worked various jobs before starting a career writing for film and television during the 1960s. In addition to co-writing the story for Eastwood's role in Dirty Harry, Heims drafted the screenplay for Play Misty for Me, which served as Eastwood's own directorial debut in 1971. Heims continued to screenwrite throughout the decade before dying of breast cancer in 1978.

== Biography ==
Jo Heims was born in Philadelphia on January 15, 1930. She worked as a model, dancer, and fashion illustrator and moved to California in the 1950s to become a writer in show business. Heims was first credited as a production secretary on the science fiction movie Missile to the Moon in 1958. She worked primarily as a secretary throughout the next decade while writing and selling screenplays on the side. Heims received writing credits in television and movies in a wide range of genres for both independent and major film studios. These include the crime drama The Girl in Lovers Lane, the horror feature The Devil's Hand, the western Navajo Run, and the musical Double Trouble.

While working at Universal Pictures, Heims crossed paths with and befriended Clint Eastwood, then an up-and-coming actor. By the late 1960s, Eastwood had achieved international fame as a western-action star and began directing his own films. Heims drafted a 60-page screenplay for Play Misty for Me, a psychological thriller that would soon become Eastwood's directorial debut. The plot follows a radio disc jockey who becomes a stalking victim of an obsessed, female fan. Heims based the latter character on a woman she knew after it was suggested to her by an acquaintance. Although he initially optioned the script, Eastwood encouraged Heims to sell it to Universal when she received a larger offer. The company shelved the project, so when Eastwood later signed a three-picture contract with Universal, he regained the screenplay and had it revised by Dean Riesner. Play Misty for Me was released in 1971, the year Eastwood also took the title role in the crime thriller Dirty Harry. Heims contributed to the story of the latter film, but she received no screen credit.

Heims married William Duffy in August 1972. That same year, Universal distributed the thriller You'll Like My Mother, a script that Heims adapted from a novel by Naomi A. Hintze. The following year, she collaborated with Eastwood again by writing Breezy, also distributed by Universal. The drama depicts a romance between a jaded, middle-aged divorcee and a much younger, free-spirited woman. Heims additionally served as an associate producer for the movie, allowing her to coordinate some of its creative elements. She developed the male lead with Eastwood in mind to play the part. However, the two agreed he was too young for the role, so it went to the older William Holden instead. Eastwood's then-mistress Jo Ann Harris was a strong contender for the female lead, but Heims reportedly felt Harris was wrong for the part and suggested her friend Sondra Locke, even though Locke was five years older than Harris and 12 years older than the character as written. Heims set up the very first meeting between Locke and Eastwood, but Kay Lenz ultimately earned the part as Locke was too old to be credible in it.

By 1974, Heims had composed a script for a horror-suspense film titled "Mrs. Manning's Weekend". It was purchased by director-producer Peter S. Traynor, then rewritten and released as Death Game three years later. She then completed the women in prison teleplay Nightmare in Badham County, a television movie. Not long after, Heims fell ill with a breast cancer diagnosis. Her final work was another TV feature, the murder mystery Secrets of Three Hungry Wives. Heims wrote the teleplay as long as she could before handing it off to executive producer Alan Surgal to finish. Heims died on April 22, 1978, in Los Angeles at the age of 48. Eastwood reportedly attended her funeral.

== Filmography ==
Year	Title	Credit(s)	Notes
1978	Secrets of Three Hungry Wives	teleplay	TV movie
1977	Death Game	screenplay	uncredited
1976	Nightmare in Badham County	teleplay	TV movie
1973	Breezy	screenplay, associate producer	
1972	You'll Like My Mother	adapted screenplay	
1971	Dirty Harry	story	uncredited
1971	Play Misty for Me	screenplay, story	
1969	The First Time	screenplay	
1968	Here Come the Brides	writing	TV series (episode "The Man of the Family")
1967	Double Trouble	screenplay	
1967	The Fugitive	Writing, teleplay	TV series (episode "Corner of Hell")
1965	Tell Me in the Sunlight	screenplay	
1964	Navajo Run	screenplay	
1963	The Gun Hawk	screenplay	
1961	The Devil's Hand	screenplay	
1960	The Girl in Lovers Lane	screenplay	
1960	The Threat	screenplay	
1958	Missile to the Moon	production secretary	
