= Ron Soble =

American actor

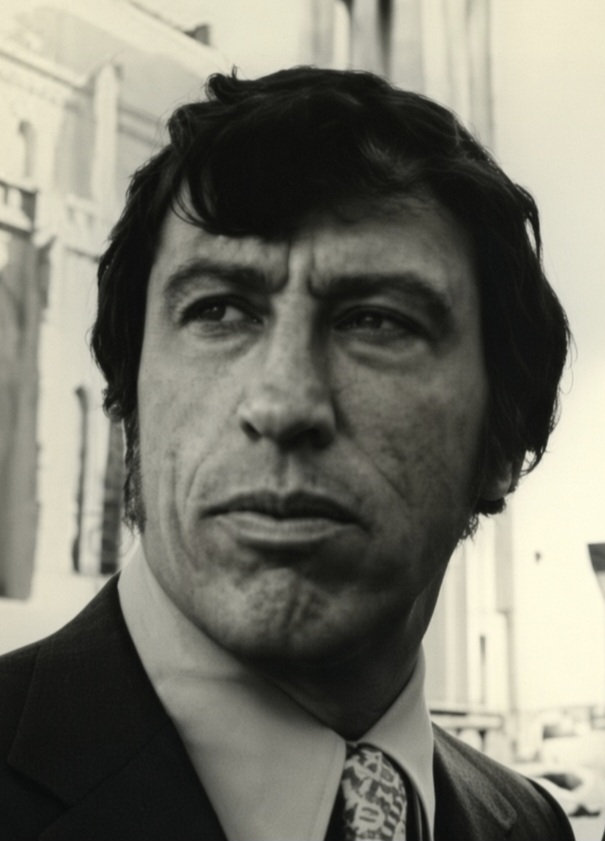
- Soble in Mission: Impossible, 1973
- Born: Ronald Norman Soble; March 28, 1928; Chicago, Illinois
- Died: May 2, 2002 (aged 74); Los Angeles, California
- Occupation: Actor
- Years active: 1955–1999
- Organization: Screen Actors Guild
- Spouse: Elynor
- Parents: Aaron Soble (father); Dorothy Turk (mother)
- Military career
- Allegiance: United States
- Branch: U.S. Army
- Service years: 1946–1948
- Unit: Airborne

Ronald Norman Soble, also known and credited as Ron Soble, (March 28, 1928 – May 2, 2002) was an American actor in films and television for forty-five years.

== Early years ==
The son of Aaron Soble and Dorothy Turk, Soble was born and raised in Chicago, where he was Golden Gloves boxing champ in 1944 and played football and ran track for the University of Michigan. From 1946 to 1948 he served in the United States Army Airborne. At the 1952 USA Outdoor Track and Field Championships, he became a U.S. national champion in the long jump.

Soble studied acting at the University of Michigan, graduating with a Bachelor of Arts degree. He underwent further study in New York, and performed in classical plays, including those of William Shakespeare.

== Career ==
Soble screen debut was in 1958. He appeared in the films I Mobster, Al Capone, Walk Tall, Gun Fight, Navajo Run, The Cincinnati Kid, True Grit, Chisum, Joe Kidd, Papillon, When You Comin' Back, Red Ryder?, The Beast Within and Pterodactyl Woman from Beverly Hills, among others.

His television debut came in 1961. Soble had a recurring role on the ABC Western series The Monroes. He played a Native American character called Dirty Jim.

Other television appearances include series such as The Aquanauts, Baretta, Bonanza, Bronco, Cain's Hundred, Charlie's Angels, CHiPs, Combat!, Death Valley Days, The Deputy, Fantasy Island, Gunslinger, Gunsmoke, Harry O, Have Gun - Will Travel, The Islanders, Knight Rider, Lawman, Markham, The Misadventures of Sheriff Lobo, Mission: Impossible, Not for Hire, Planet of the Apes, Rawhide, The Rebel, The Rockford Files, Sara, Shazam!, Shotgun Slade, Star Trek, The Streets of San Francisco, Tales of Wells Fargo, The Tall Man, The Texan, Tightrope!, Two Faces West, The Virginian, and Wagon Train, among others.

== Personal life ==
Soble was wed to Elynor in 1952 for 49 years until his death. The couple had two daughters.

Off screen, Soble was active with, and served on the Board for, the Screen Actors Guild. Among other awards, he received the Ralph Morgan Award for Distinguished Service to the Hollywood Branch in 1998, and in 2002 received a Golden Boot award.

== Death ==
He died of lung and brain cancer on May 2, 2002, in Los Angeles, California at age 74.

== Filmography ==
A partial filmography follows.

=== Film ===
- I Mobster (1959) as Al Henchman
- Al Capone (1959) as John Scalisi
- Raintree County (1957) as Rebel Soldier (uncredited)
- Walk Tall (1960) as Leach
- Gun Fight (1961) as Pawnee
- Navajo Run (1964) as Jesse Grog
- The Cincinnati Kid (1965) as Danny
- True Grit (1969) as Capt. Boots Finch
- Chisum (1970) as Charley Bowdre
- Macho Callahan (1970) as Cowboy #2
- Joe Kidd (1972) as Ramon
- Papillon (1973) as Santini
- When You Comin' Back, Red Ryder? (1979) as Sheriff Garcia
- The Beast Within (1982) as Tom Laws
- Pterodactyl Woman from Beverly Hills (1996) as Pablo Picasso
- Street Corner Justice (1996) as Chief McTighe
- Deuce Bigalow: Male Gigolo (1999) as Judge (uncredited, final film role)

=== Television ===
Year	Title	Role	Notes
1959	Rawhide	Hansho	"Incident of the Tinker's Dam"
1959	Bonanza	Tukwa	"Death on Sun Mountain"
1962	The Virginian	Mungo	"It Tolls for Thee"
1965	Combat!	German Sergeant	
1966	The Monroes	Dirty Jim	Recurring role, 19 episodes (1966-1967)
1968	Star Trek	Wyatt Earp	"Spectre of the Gun"
1970	The Virginian	Deputy Royal Wainwright	Season 9, Episode 8: "Lady at the Bar"
1972	The Daughters of Joshua Cabe	Arnie	TV Movie
1974	Gunsmoke	Clatch	"Town in Chains" (S20E2)
1974	The Six Million Dollar Man	Queng-Dri	"The Coward" (S1E12)
1987	Convicted: A Mother's Story		TV Movie
1984	The Mystic Warrior	Wanagi	TV Movie
1986	Knight Rider	Dr. Thorne	"Burial Ground" (S4E5)
