= Johnny Seven (actor) =

American actor (1926–2010)

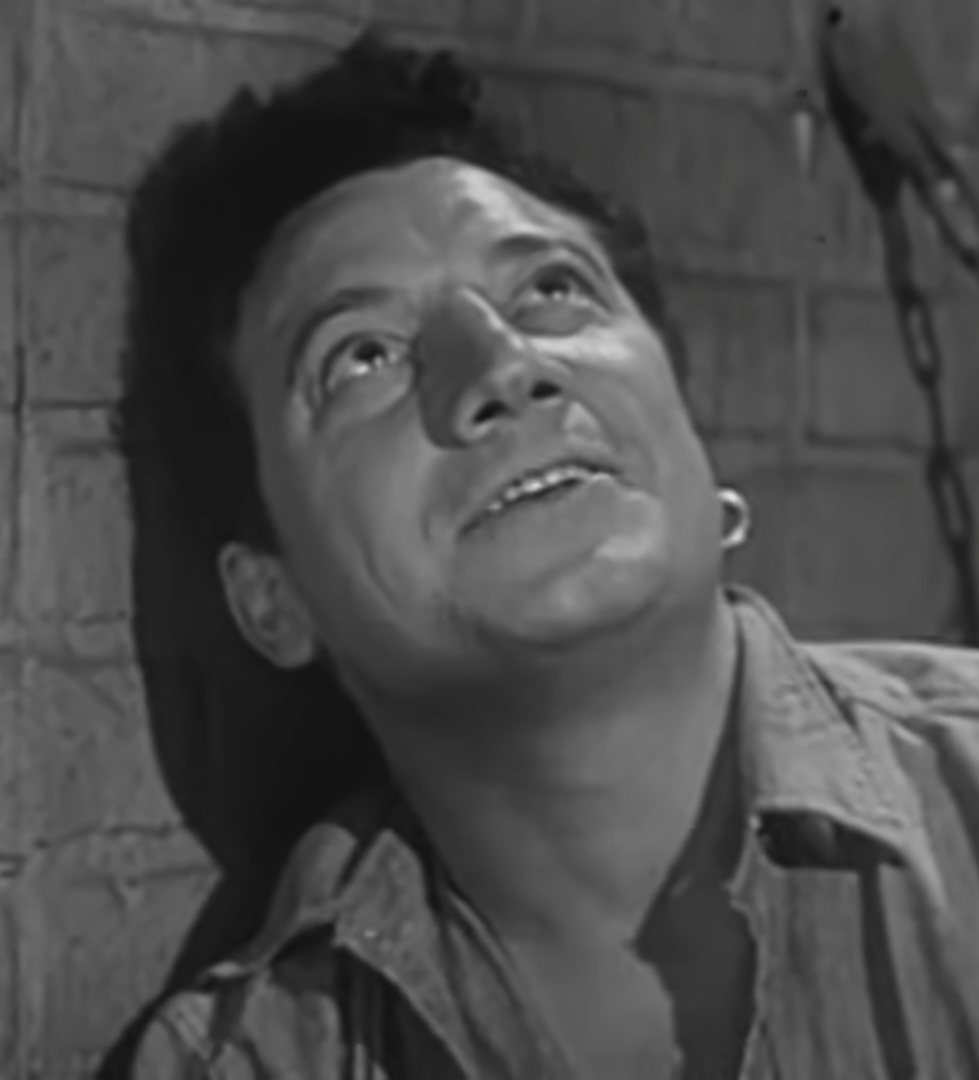
- Born: John Anthony Fetto, II; February 23, 1926; Brooklyn, New York, U.S.
- Died: January 22, 2010 (aged 83); Mission Hills, California, U.S.
- Occupation: Actor
- Spouse: Edith Fetto (m. 1949)
- Children: 2

John Anthony Fetto, II (February 23, 1926 – January 22, 2010), known professionally as Johnny Seven, was an American character actor who appeared in 26 films and approximately 600 television shows during his career, which spanned more than 40 years. His credits included the 1960 film The Apartment and a recurring role as Lt. Carl Reese on the 1968–1975 television series Ironside.

== Early life ==
Seven was born in Bay Ridge, Brooklyn. His parents, who were Italian immigrants, also had five daughters. He began acting and singing as a teenager. He served with the United States Army in the Philippines during World War II and performed with the United Service Organizations (USO). Fetto earned his nickname "Johnny Seven" while serving in the Army and kept it as his stage name following the end of the war.

== Career ==
Seven began his acting career in New York City theater. He portrayed Karl Matuschka, the brother in-law of Shirley MacLaine's character, in The Apartment. His other film credits include The Last Mile (1959), Guns of the Timberland (1960), What Did You Do in the War, Daddy? (1968) and Murder at the World Series (1977). Seven co-wrote, produced, directed, and starred in Navajo Run, his western independent film released in 1964.

On television, in addition to Ironside, he was cast in the spin-off series Amy Prentiss. His other television credits included roles on Rescue 8, The Man from Blackhawk, Bonanza, Hennesey, The Everglades, Gunsmoke (as murderous outlaw “Barens” in 1965’s S11E1’s “Seven Hours to Dawn“), CHiPs, Naked City, Route 66, Mickey Spillane's Mike Hammer, The Phil Silvers Show, Batman (episodes 25 and 26), Death Valley Days, Peter Gunn, The Untouchables, The Rockford Files, The Wild Wild West,The Rookies and Charlie's Angels.

In 1962, he was cast as farmer Carlo Farelli in the episode "The Last Shot" on the anthology series Death Valley Days, hosted by Stanley Andrews. In the story, Carlo sees saloon singer Della (Grace Lee Whitney as a wife but soon encounters competition from another suitor.

In addition to his acting career, Seven also owned a real estate business in the San Fernando Valley.

== Death ==
Seven died of complications from lung cancer at Providence Holy Cross Medical Center in Mission Hills, California on January 22, 2010, at age 83. He was survived by his wife of 60 years, Edith. and his son, John Anthony Fetto, III, an attorney in Walnut Creek, California. His memorial service was held at St. John Baptist de La Salle Parish in Granada Hills, California, on February 6, 2010.

== Filmography ==
Year	Title	Role	Notes
1954	On the Waterfront	Longshoreman	uncredited
1957	Johnny Gunman	Allie	
1958	Cop Hater	William 'Willie' Bronken	
1959	Never Steal Anything Small	Joe, a Stevedore	uncredited
1959	The Last Mile	Tom D'Amoro	
1959	That Kind of Woman	Minor Role	uncredited
1960	Guns of the Timberland	Vince	
1960	The Music Box Kid	Tony Maldano	
1960	The Apartment	Karl Matuschka	
1961	Boy Who Caught a Crook	Rocky Kent	
1964	Navajo Run	Mathew Whitehawk	
1965	The Greatest Story Ever Told	Pilate's Aide	uncredited
1966	What Did You Do in the War, Daddy?	Vittorio	
1967	Gunfight in Abilene	Loop	
1968	The Destructors	Spaniard	
1969	The Love God?	Petey	
