= The Girl in Lovers Lane =

- Theatrical release poster
- Directed by: Charles R. Rondeau
- Screenplay by: Jo Heims
- Produced by: Robert Roark (producer); Roger Markle (associate producer)
- Starring: Brett Halsey; Jack Elam
- Cinematography: Edward Cronjager
- Edited by: Howard Epstein
- Music by: Ronald Stein
- Production companies: Brigadier Pictures, Inc.
- Distributed by: Filmgroup
- Release date: January 1, 1960 (U.S.)
- Running time: 78 minutes
- Country: United States
- Language: English

The Girl in Lovers Lane is a 1960 American film directed by Charles R. Rondeau following the adventures of two drifters who get involved with the residents of the little town of Sherman. The working title of the film was The Young and the Damned. It was released by Filmgroup as a double feature with The Wild Ride.

== Plot summary ==
Danny is a young adult from a wealthy family. He runs away from home because his parents are divorcing. Hopping into a railroad boxcar, Danny meets Bix Dugan, a long-time drifter who agrees to mentor Danny. Danny's naïveté leads him to a variety of precarious situations from which Bix must extract him.

Stopping in a small town, Danny and Bix get jobs in a diner. Bix becomes romantically involved with the waitress Carrie and re-examines his lifestyle. This earns him the ire of Jesse, a troubled character in the town who is fixated on Carrie.

In a fit of jealousy, Jesse assaults Carrie, but Bix is accused of her subsequent death. Carrie's father Cal attacks Bix in a drunken rage before Danny forces Jesse to confess.

== Cast ==
- Brett Halsey as Bix Dugan
- Joyce Meadows as Carrie Anders
- Lowell Brown as Danny Winslow
- Jack Elam as Jesse
- Selette Cole as Peggy
- Bill Coontz as Bill Coontz
- Emile Meyer as Cal Anders
- Del Monroe as mugger in train yard
- Asa Maynor as girl in bathtub

== Mystery Science Theater 3000 ==
With the assault scene excised, The Girl in Lovers Lane was featured in the fifth season of Mystery Science Theater 3000, first aired in 1993.

== See also ==
- List of American films of 1960
- Of Mice and Men, 1939 adaptation similar in content
- Hobo

== Sources ==
This article incorporates text from a free content work. Licensed under CC BY-SA. Text taken from MST3K 509 - The Girl in Lovers Lane, Mystery Science Theater 3000 Wiki.
