= Sheila MacRae =

American actress, singer, dancer (1921 - 2014)

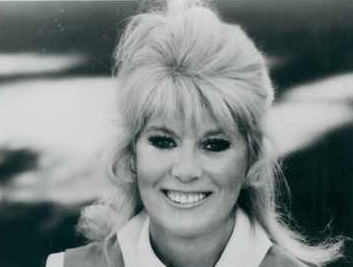
- MacRae in 1974
- Born: Sheila Margaret Stephens; 24 September 1921; London, England
- Died: 6 March 2014 (aged 92); Englewood, New Jersey, US
- Other name: Sheila Margaret Stevens
- Occupations: Actress, producer, singer
- Years active: 1950–1993
- Spouses: Gordon MacRae (m. 1941; div. 1967) Ronald Wayne (m. 1967; div. 1970)
- Children: 4; including Heather MacRae and Meredith MacRae

Sheila Margaret MacRae (née Stephens; 24 September 1921 – 6 March 2014) was an English-born American actress, singer, and dancer.

== Career ==
MacRae appeared in such films as Caged (1950), Backfire (1950), and Sex and the Single Girl (1964). On television, MacRae played herself in an episode of I Love Lucy, "The Fashion Show", in which she asks Lucy to participate in a Hollywood fashion show organized by Don Loper and featuring actors' wives as models.

In her first continuing role on television, between 1966 and 1970, MacRae played Alice Kramden on 52 episodes of The Jackie Gleason Show, taking over the role from Audrey Meadows. She went on to have her own short-lived television series (The Sheila MacRae Show), and to play Madelyn Richmond in 1991 on the long-running soap opera General Hospital.

== Personal life ==
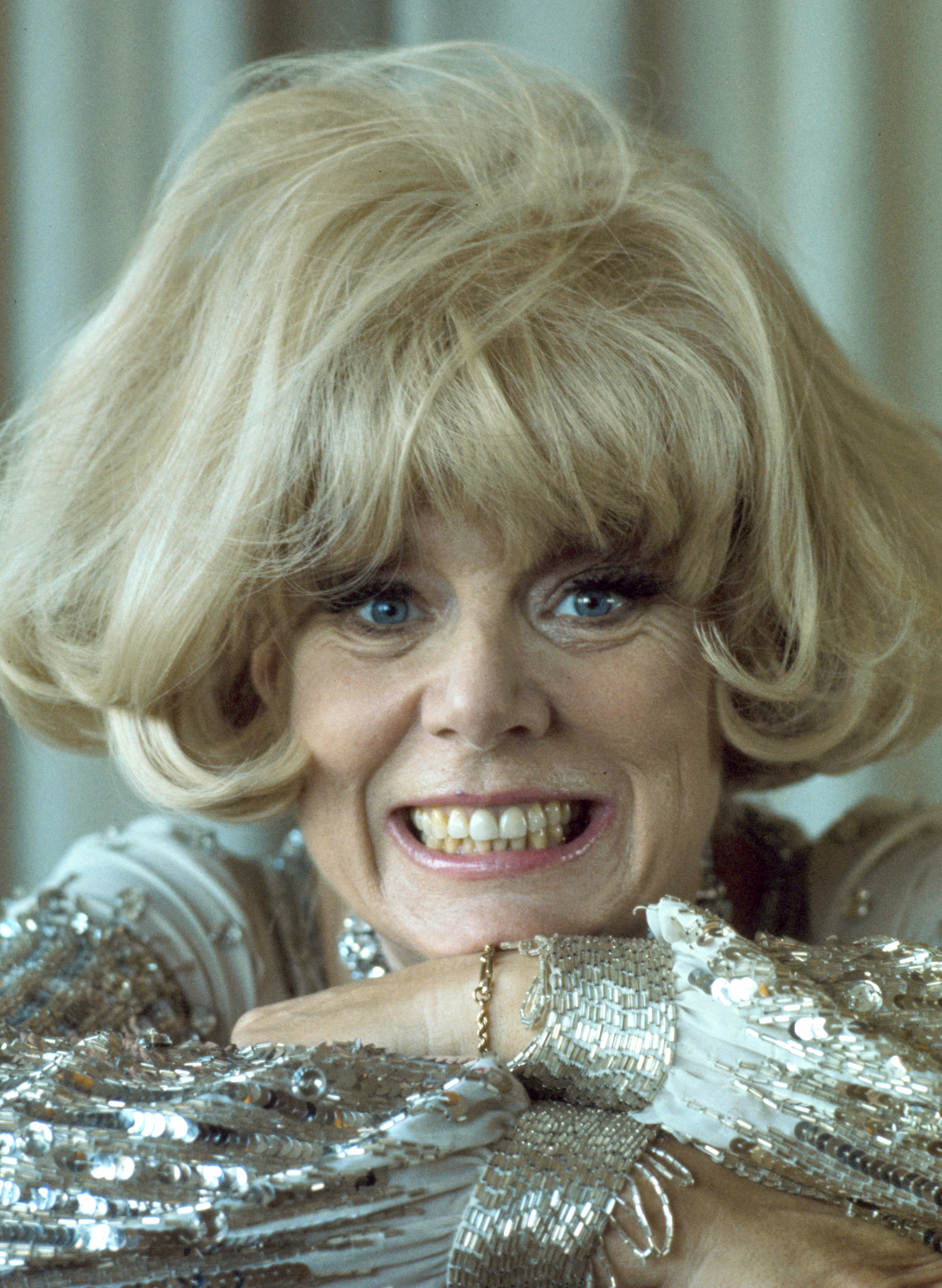
MacRae between 1960 and 1970

Sheila Margaret Stephens was born in London in 1921, but evacuated with her parents to Long Island, New York, in 1939, shortly before the onset of World War II. She finished high school when she was 15.

She married actor and singer Gordon MacRae in 1941; the couple divorced in 1967. They often appeared on the stage together in musicals such as Bells Are Ringing (in a 1964 production), and Guys and Dolls (as Miss Adelaide, a character that she took to Broadway in the 1965 revival). They were the parents of two daughters, actresses Heather and Meredith, and two sons, William Gordon ("Gar") and Robert Bruce; Meredith predeceased her.

She later married Ronald Wayne, a television producer.

MacRae became a naturalized United States citizen on 20 March 1959 in California.

== Death ==
MacRae, a devout Christian Scientist, died suddenly on 6 March 2014, in Englewood, New Jersey, aged 92, at the Lillian Booth Actor's Home. She had suffered from dementia, but was otherwise in good health, and had been hospitalized for a minor surgical procedure when her death came suddenly from natural causes, said her daughter, Heather. She was soon cremated.
