= Mickey One =

1965 film by Arthur Penn

- original film poster
- Directed by: Arthur Penn
- Written by: Alan Surgal
- Produced by: Arthur Penn
- Starring: Warren Beatty; Alexandra Stewart; Hurd Hatfield
- Cinematography: Ghislain Cloquet
- Edited by: Aram Avakian
- Music by: Eddie Sauter; Stan Getz (improvs)
- Distributed by: Columbia Pictures
- Release date: September 27, 1965
- Running time: 93 minutes
- Country: United States
- Language: English

Mickey One is a 1965 American neo noir crime film directed by Arthur Penn and starring Warren Beatty, Alexandra Stewart and Hurd Hatfield with Dennis Franz in his film debut (albeit an uncredited cameo). It was written by Alan Surgal.

Like several of Penn's later films, it draws upon the style and legacy of the French New Wave to construct an allegory of capitalism, and has also been read in reference to McCarthyism.

== Plot ==
After incurring the wrath of the Mafia, a stand-up comic flees Detroit for Chicago. He steals a Social Security card from a homeless man named Miklos Wunejeva. He uses the card to get a job, under the name Mickey One, hauling garbage for a seedy diner.

He saves up enough money from his low wages to rent a room at a local flop house and buy himself some new clothes. Eventually he returns to the stage as a stand-up comic. However, he is wary of becoming successful and afraid that he will attract too much attention. When he gets a booking at the upscale club Xanadu, he finds that his first rehearsal has become a special "audition" for an unseen man with a frightening, gruff voice. Paranoid that the mob has found him, Mickey runs away. He decides to find out who "owns" him and square himself with the mob. However, he doesn't know what he did to anger them or what his debt is. Searching for a mobster who will talk to him, he gets beaten up by several nightclub doormen. Mickey finally concludes that it's impossible to get away and be safe, so he pulls himself together and does his act anyway.

In traveling about the city, Mickey continually sees a mute mime-like character known only as The Artist. The Artist eventually unleashes his Rube Goldberg-like creation, a deliberately self-destructive machine called "Yes," an homage to the sculptor Jean Tinguely.

== Cast ==
Actor	Role	Notes
Warren Beatty	Mickey One	
Alexandra Stewart	Jenny Drayton	
Hurd Hatfield	Ed Castle	
Franchot Tone	Rudy Lopp	
Teddy Hart	George Berson	
Jeff Corey	Larry Fryer	
Kamatari Fujiwara	the artist	
Donna Michelle	the girl	
Ralph Foody	Police Captain	
Norman Gottschalk	the rvangelist	
Richard Lucas	employment agent	
Jack Goodman	cafe manager	
Jeri Jensen	Helen	
Charlene Lee	the singer	
Aram Avakian	Mickey's invisible tormentor in the theater	uncredited
Taalkeus Blank	the homeless man whose identity Mickey assumes	uncredited
Dennis Franz	Minor Role in Dressing Room	uncredited

== Production ==
Beatty and Penn did not get along while making this film. Beatty later recalled, "We had a lot of trouble on that film, because I didn't know what the hell Arthur was trying to do and I tried to find out ... I'm not sure that he knew himself" and added, "To me, the stand-up gags that the guy had to do in Mickey One were not funny and that was always my complaint with Arthur." Producer Harrison Starr recalled, "Warren and Arthur had go-arounds ... the role was basically a role of an eccentric, a person whose inner demons were reflected in the world he inhabited ... and I think that was difficult for Warren to play." Nevertheless, Beatty and Penn teamed again for Bonnie and Clyde in 1967.

== Soundtrack ==
The soundtrack was arranged by Eddie Sauter and performed by tenor saxophonist Stan Getz.

The film's soundtrack, reverberating with hints of everything from Béla Bartók to bossa nova, reteamed Stan Getz with arranger Eddie Sauter, following their album Focus (1961).

== Release and reception ==
The Monthly Film Bulletin wrote: "The symbolic significance of the film is instantly recognisable and well complemented by an explosive visual style. ...The trouble with Mickey One is that this is the only level on which it works. As a straightforward account of something that happened to a night club entertainer it makes very little sense; the surface plot is obscure as well as unbelievable, so that one is often left wondering what is really meant to be going on. ... Penn has a sensitive touch with dialogue scenes, notably the one in which Mickey and Jenny first meet. Here he draws a remarkably controlled and interesting performance from Warren Beatty, who is on the whole well cast as Mickey. Hurd Hatfield, as the impresario Castle whose toughness borders on hysteria, gives a performance full of the sort of subtle tensions that could, one feels, have illuminated more of the film."

Bosley Crowther in The New York Times praised the visual style but claimed that the film was "pretentious and monotonous."

Time called the film, "never boring but never very precise, and finally goes to pieces amidst the crash of its own symbols."

In 1979, James Monaco wrote that Mickey One "except for Woody Allen's Interiors, is the most pretentious film by a major American filmmaker in the last thirty years".

== Accolades ==
Penn received a nomination for a Golden Lion at the Venice Film Festival.

== Rediscovery ==
The rediscovery of the film began in 1995 with a booking at San Francisco's Castro Theater and a reevaluation by Peter Stack:

Mickey One is, in essence, a jazz film with an edgy style in which shadings and tone of voice are everything. It is laced with American idioms in its script by Alan Surgal, and most of Beatty's lines have a smart-alecky tone. When he goes on the run, Mickey meets a woman who wonders who he is (since he can't shake his show-biz patina) and he hits her with the line: "I'm the king of silent movies hiding out till the talkies blow over." In another place he verbally assaults a nightclub owner who can't figure out why Mickey's so edgy, saying, "I'm guilty of not being innocent." At the start we see pretty-boy Beatty as a hot comic in Detroit. He's got it all -- good looks, the swagger of a deft improviser -- and he's having a torrid affair with a blond siren. (The film is filled with women bursting with desire.) But fortune quickly turns -- witness to a torture murder in a back room, the comic flees, hoboes his way to Chicago's West Side and takes refuge in a junkyard. There he runs into another nightmarish scene -- police investigating a murder in an automobile crusher. The cinematic invention in Mickey One has been dismissed by some critics as contrivance. But Penn may have been decades ahead of his time in depicting an urban America as gallery of paranoia, cynicism and loneliness. In a classic scene, the comic is up against a brick wall auditioning at a nightclub, a single, powerful spotlight trained on him so he can't see into the audience. Penn creates an agonizing moment of a man talking awkwardly to God while looking as if he's standing before a firing squad.

== See also ==
- List of American films of 1965
- Lenny, 1974 film about Lenny Bruce; similar in content
- French New Wave
