= KRML =

- Carmel, California; United States
- Broadcast area: Monterey Bay
- Frequency: 1410 kHz (C-QUAM AM Stereo)
- Branding: Community Radio KRML 1410 AM & 94.7 FM

Programming
- Language: English
- Format: Adult album alternative (AAA) (Community)

Ownership
- Owner: El Avance LLC

History
- First air date: 1958
- Former call signs: KTEE (1957–1960)
- Call sign meaning: "Carmel"

Technical information
- Licensing authority: FCC
- Facility ID: 73064
- Class: D
- Power: 500 watts (day); 16 watts (night)
- Transmitter coordinates: 36°32′10.9″N 121°54′16.8″W
- Translator: 94.7 K234DH (Monterey)

Links
- Public license information: Public file; LMS
- Webcast: Listen live
- Website: krml.com

KRML (1410 AM) is a non-commercial educational radio station licensed to Carmel, California, United States. The station, established in 1958 as KTEE, is currently owned and operated by El Avance LLC. KRML was the setting for the 1971 Clint Eastwood film Play Misty For Me.

KRML broadcasts an adult album alternative (AAA) music format to the Monterey Bay area, branded as KRML Radio. KRML was simulcast over FM translator K271BP (102.1 FM) until February 1, 2020, when it moved to K234DH 94.7 FM.

== History ==
=== Launch as KTEE ===
Broadcasting with 500 watts of power as a daytime-only station on a frequency of 1410 kHz, this station began regular operations in 1958 as KTEE. The station was established by Seaside Electronic Associates with Paul F. Hanson serving as the president, general manager, and news director. Hanson's original staff included Joly Boynton as chief engineer and co-program director, William Warren as co-program director, and Tillie Jones as women's director. By 1959, Hanson assumed the program director role with Hal Briggs as chief engineer and Alleene Knight as women's director.

=== 1960s ===
The Carmel Broadcasting Company acquired the station on March 4, 1960, and had the Federal Communications Commission (FCC) change the station's call sign to KRML. Under the new ownership, Sam S. Smith became president and general manager with Alan B. Skuba as station manager and Ralph S. Click as chief engineer. Personnel turnover meant that by 1963 Mel Leeds was general manager and program director, Bob Davis became news director, and Bill Robinson was named chief engineer. At the same time, the station's specialty programming included weekly half-hour programs in German and Italian plus 10 hours of Spanish language programming each week.

The station was again placed up for sale and on November 17, 1965, KRML was acquired by a new company called KRML, Inc. Alan C. Lisser was company president with John T. McCartt as general manager, Kim Collins as program director, and Fred Sweet as chief engineer. The new owners obtained a construction permit for a new FM sister station to be called "KRML-FM". However, plans fell through and the permit was transferred to Monterey Bay Area Media who eventually signed on KLRB-FM (101.7 FM, now license as KCDU). In 1968, Jan Allen became KRML's program director with Ed Parkhurst as the new chief engineer.

1968 also saw the station sold yet again, this time to Samuel & D.R. Salerno who acquired KRML on October 25, 1968. Samuel Salerno held the offices of president and general manager with D.R. Salerno as secretary-treasurer.

=== 1970s ===
The Salerno ownership group, now doing business as KRML, Inc., brought a degree of stability to KRML in the 1970s. Sam Salerno held onto the station for nearly 9 years before placing the station up for sale. On October 1, 1977, KRML was acquired by the Edwards Broadcasting Company, Inc., with George A. Edwards as president and general manager. The station shifted to a religious radio format.

=== 1980s ===
In October 1982, the Edwards Broadcasting Company applied to the FCC to upgrade KRML from daytime-only to 24-hour operation with a stronger signal from a new broadcast tower site. The FCC granted the initial construction permit for this change in June 1983. As ownership changed, so did the station's proposed new tower sites, signal strengths, and financial conditions. The project was granted extensions, renewals, and modifications throughout the 1980s and 1990s before the permit was ultimately cancelled at then-current station ownership's request in February 1999. While a limited-range 16 watt nighttime signal was added to the station, as of November 2011 it essentially remains the same 500 watt daytimer that it signed on as back in 1957.

In August 1985, the Edwards Broadcasting Company reached an agreement to sell KRML to Wisdom Broadcasting Company, Inc. The FCC approved the deal on October 7, 1985, and the transaction was formally consummated on January 16, 1986. At the time of the sale, Wisdom Broadcasting Company was 100% owned by Gilbert F. Wisdom.

=== 1990s ===
During 1993 and 1994, KRML derived some of its programming from the satellite feed of KJAZ (92.7 FM) in San Francisco. KJAZ dropped its jazz format in 1994 to become a rock station, discontinuing the programming service.

Seeking to step back from day-to-day operations of KRML while retaining an ownership interest, Gilbert F. Wisdom applied to the FCC in December 1994 for permission to sell a 50% stake in Wisdom Broadcasting Company, Inc., to Alan P. Schultz. Along with this ownership split, Wisdom informed the FCC that Schultz would have effective control of the station's broadcast license. The FCC approved the deal on January 13, 1995, and the transaction was formally consummated on February 8, 1995.

=== 2000s ===
In March 2004, Wisdom and Schultz agreed to sell all of their shares in Wisdom Broadcasting Company, Inc., to David C. Kimball. To resolve various financial obligations within the company, Kimball paid Wisdom $725,000 for his 50% and paid Schultz $425,000 for his 50%. The FCC approved the license transfer on April 23, 2004, and the transaction was formally consummated on June 10, 2004. Kimball moved the station to the Eastwood Building in the center of Carmel.

In 2009, David C. Kimball declared personal bankruptcy. As part of the resolution of this financial situation, Kimball agree to transfer ownership of Wisdom Broadcasting Company, Inc., to Monterey County Bank. The bank already held a lien on the station's broadcast equipment and other property. The FCC approved the move on November 3, 2009, and the transaction was formally consummated the same day. The bank immediately began to seek a buyer for the station.

=== 2010s ===
In August 2011, the bank applied to the FCC for permission to transfer the KRML broadcast license from Wisdom Broadcasting Company, Inc., to Carmel Valley Athletic Club, Inc. This company is 100% owned by Scot E. McKay. The purchase price from the bank totaled just $150,000, a full million dollars less than David C. Kimball had paid for the station in 2004. (The bank had been asking for as much as $350,000.) Station property purchased include the transmitter building, broadcast tower, the station's license and intellectual properties, plus a 1998 Yamaha C5 conservatory grand piano. Excluded from the sale were the inventory of the jazz store, the Blackhawk music collection, various concert items, and a Hammond B3 organ. The FCC approved the deal on October 18, 2011, and the transaction was formally consummated on November 6, 2011. On October 15, 2012, the jazz format was dropped in favor of stunting as "Radio Yummy", in anticipation of a format change. KRML adopted a ten-song playlist and a new slogan, "Your hits over and over and over again." On Monday, October 29, 2012, Scot McKay explained that "Radio Yummy" was meant to show all that is bad with "corporate radio." He promised that KRML would be live and local and be responsive to the listeners. KRML changed its format to a broad-based adult album alternative format with several lifestyle programs (food and wine, travel, entertainment, local music) on weekends. The jazz format is now online only, at http://www.krml.com. Effective February 14, 2019, licensee CVAC, Inc. changed its name to KRML Radio, LLC.

=== 2023 ===
On Sunday, October 1 at 5pm, after a 15 year absence, jazz music returned to 94.7 KRML in Carmel / Monterey and online at www.krml.com, with the launch of the Just Jazz Radio Show with host LeRoy Downs. The weekly radio show, which airs every Sunday at 5pm, features a mix of jazz music, cutting edge new jazz as well as classic jazz from young jazz artists as well as music from jazz masters in a one hour live DJ hosted radio format.

== Film appearance ==
In the 1971 motion picture Play Misty for Me, KRML is the radio station where Dave (Clint Eastwood) is a DJ harassed by a caller, Evelyn (played by Jessica Walter) who wants him to play "Misty" for her. The broadcast studio and surrounding area appeared in the film.

=== Previous logo ===
KRML's logo under previous jazz format
