= Dark Mirror (1984 film) =

1984 film

- Genre: Drama; Thriller
- Directed by: Richard Lang
- Starring: Vincent Gardenia; Jane Seymour; Stephen Collins
- Music by: Dominic Frontiere
- Country of origin: United States
- Original language: English

Production
- Executive producers: Douglas S. Cramer; Aaron Spelling
- Production location: Pepperdine University
- Cinematography: Frank Stanley
- Running time: 120 min.
- Production company: Aaron Spelling Productions

Original release
- Network: ABC
- Release: March 5, 1984

Dark Mirror is a 1984 American TV movie. It was a remake of a 1946 film.

== Cast ==
- Jane Seymour as Leigh; Tracy
- Stephen Collins as Dr Jim Eiseley
- Vincent Gardenia as Detective Al Church
- Hank Brandt as Girard
- Ty Henderson as Wittman
- Jack Kruschen as Smithson
- Bill Quinn as Mr Bennett
- Cathleen Cordell as Mrs Bennett
- Robert DoQui as Higgens
- Reid Cruickshanks as Avery
- Sandy Freeman as Dorothy Francis
- Patti Been as Policewoman

== Production ==
Filming took place in September 1983. Seymour read the first draft, then saw the original film. She asked why they did not simply remake that, and the film was rewritten.

"It was the perfect role," Seymour said later, "giving me the chance to play it sweetly and then be nasty and vicious at the same time."
