= The Threat (1960 film) =

1960 film

- Theatrical release poster
- Directed by: Charles R. Rondeau
- Written by: Jo Heims
- Produced by: Charles R. Rondeau
- Starring: Robert Knapp; Linda Lawson; Lisabeth Hush; James Seay; Mary Castle; Barney Phillips
- Cinematography: Edward Cronjager
- Edited by: Howard Epstein
- Music by: Ronald Stein
- Production company: Robin Rae Productions
- Distributed by: Warner Bros. Pictures
- Release date: March 12, 1960
- Running time: 66 minutes
- Country: United States
- Language: English

The Threat is a 1960 American crime film directed by Charles R. Rondeau, written by Jo Heims, and starring Robert Knapp, Linda Lawson, Lisabeth Hush, James Seay, Mary Castle and Barney Phillips. It was released by Warner Bros. Pictures on March 12, 1960.

== Plot ==
Hotheaded cynical loner cop Steve Keenan (Robert Knapp) starts getting anonymous threats from someone who is upset with the fact that he killed a gangster kingpin in self-defense. Steve is casually seeing a beautiful torch singer named Gerri (Linda Lawson), who is in love with him and wishes he would commit to her. Steve is hesitant to do that, because he is still feeling burned about his ex Laura (Mary Castle) leaving him and taking up with the now-deceased gangster. His brother (and fellow cop) Harry (James Seay) tries to get him to take the threats seriously, but he just brushes them off until things start taking a deadly turn...

== Cast ==
- Robert Knapp as Steve Keenan
- Linda Lawson as Gerri
- Lisabeth Hush as Sandy
- James Seay as Harry Keenan
- Mary Castle as Laura Wallace
- Barney Phillips as Lucky
- Richard Cowl as Chessner
- Lew Brown as Jim Smiley
- Art Lewis as Mousie
- Tom Gilson as Junior
- Emile Meyer as Duncan
- Nicholas King as Georgie
- Alfred Shelly as Chessner Henchman
- Ric Roman as Lucky's Underworld Contact
- Bert Rumsey as Bert the Bartender
