= Virginia Vincent =

American actress (1918–2013)

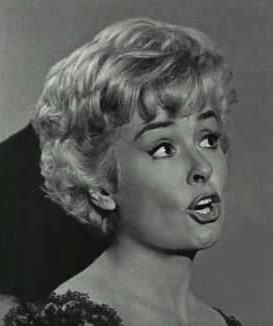
- Vincent in 77 Sunset Strip (1963)
- Born: May 3, 1918; Goshen, New York, U.S.
- Died: October 3, 2013 (aged 95)
- Occupation: Actress
- Years active: 1950–1988
- Spouse(s): Jack Vincent (m. 1939; div. 19??) Frank London (m. 1959; div. 1962)

Virginia Vincent (May 3, 1918 – October 3, 2013) was an American film, television and theatre actress. She was known for playing Jennie Blake in the 1958 film The Return of Dracula.

Vincent died on October 3, 2013, at the age of 95.

== Partial filmography ==
- California Passage (1950) - Mazie (uncredited)
- The Company She Keeps (1951) - Annabelle Bird (uncredited)
- Taxi (1953) - Hortense (uncredited)
- The Helen Morgan Story (1957) - Sue
- The Return of Dracula (1958) - Jennie Blake
- The Black Orchid (1958) - Alma Gallo
- I Want to Live! (1958) - Peg
- Perry Mason (1958–1960) - 3 episodes, various characters
- Never Steal Anything Small (1959) - Ginger
- The Real McCoys (1962) - Nancy Templeton
- Love with the Proper Stranger (1963) - Anna
- Navajo Run (1964) - Sarah Grog
- Tony Rome (1967) - Sally Bullock
- Dragnet (1967–1970) - 6 episodes, various characters
- Gunsmoke - "The Money Store" (1968) - Louise Thorpe
- Sweet November (1968) - Mrs. Schumacher
- Change of Habit (1969) - Miss Parker
- Rabbit, Run (1970) - Margaret
- The Million Dollar Duck (1971) - Eunice Hooper
- Emergency! - “Botulism” (1972) - Martha Gilmore
- The Baby (1973)
- Adam-12 (1974) - "Hollywood Division" - Shiela Turman
- Kolchak: The Night Stalker - "Firefall" (1974) - Mrs. Markoff
- Airport 1975 (1974) - Gina Arriba - Passenger (uncredited)
- Treasure of Matecumbe (1976) - Aunt Lou
- The Hills Have Eyes (1977) - Ethel Carter
- Amy (1981) - Edna Hancock
- Invitation to Hell (1984) - Grace Henderson
- The Longshot (1986) - Waitress
