= The Devil's Hand =

1961 film

- Theatrical release poster
- Directed by: William J. Hole, Jr.
- Screenplay by: Jo Heims
- Produced by: Alvin K. Bubis; Rex Carlton
- Starring: Robert Alda; Linda Christian; Ariadna Welter; Neil Hamilton; Gere Craft
- Cinematography: Meredith M. Nicholson
- Edited by: Howard Epstein
- Music by: Allyn Ferguson; Michael Terr
- Distributed by: Crown International Pictures
- Release date: September 13, 1961
- Running time: 71 minutes
- Country: United States
- Language: English

The Devil's Hand (a.k.a. Witchcraft, The Naked Goddess, Devil's Doll and Live to Love) is a 1961 American independent horror film. It was produced by Alvin K. Bublis and directed by William J. Hole Jr. The film stars Linda Christian, Robert Alda, Ariadna Welter and Neil Hamilton. It was made in 1959 by Rex Carlton Productions, but not distributed until 1961 by Crown International Pictures. It follows the activities of a group of 20th century Los Angelenos who are members of a cult that worships Gamba, the Great Devil God.

== Plot ==
Rick Turner has a problem. He awakens night after night seeing visions of a woman in a negligee dancing in the clouds. The visions disturb him. One night he gets up, goes walking and is drawn to a doll shop. In the window he sees a doll that is the exact image of the woman in his visions. He takes his girlfriend Donna Trent there the next day. To his surprise the doll shop owner, Frank Lamont, not only knows his name but insists that he ordered the doll, a likeness of Bianca Milan, whom Rick has never met.

Donna spots a doll that looks just like her. Frank refuses to sell it. As Rick and Donna leave, Frank takes the doll into his back room with curtains, open-flame lamps, an altar, a statue of the Buddha. He stabs the doll with a long pin. Donna collapses in pain. Rick takes her to hospital, where a doctor tells him that she has had a "spasm of the heart" and needs complete bed rest.

Rick has another vision of Bianca. He tells Donna that he is going to deliver the Bianca doll to Bianca "to get this thing off my back." When Rick returns to the doll shop, Frank hands over the doll, insisting that Rick had paid for it in advance. Perplexed, Rick goes to Bianca's luxurious apartment and is entranced by her beauty. They become lovers that night. Bianca explains that his visions are a "simple process of thought projection or thought transference," which she learned as a member of the cult of Gamba, the Great Devil God. She makes Rick accompany her right then to a cult meeting so that he can be inducted. The meeting is held in the back room at the doll shop, for Frank is the High Executioner of the Gamba cult.

At the meeting, Bianca explains that a human sacrifice ceremony is to be held. A young woman is laid on the altar; above her a wheel studded with knives is spun. As it lowers, Gamba decides if the sacrifice lives or dies. Frank goes behind the lectern and steps on a foot pedal, making it unclear whether he or Gamba controls the wheel. The knife blade that strikes the sacrifice is rubber. She survives unhurt. A man in the cult covertly snaps a photo of the event.

Later, at the doll shop, Rick spots the Donna doll, pinned to the wall through the heart, but he cannot remove the pin without being seen. He goes to the hospital and tells Donna that she will be completely cured at midnight that night.

Donna is in fact cured at midnight and discharged. Mary, a cultist and nurse at the hospital, calls Bianca to report this turn of events. When Rick arrives at Bianca's apartment, she tells him that they must attend an emergency meeting of the cult at 10:30 that night. During the meeting, Frank says that one of them is an "intruder" and will die at midnight, then adjourns until 12:30 am. At the stroke of midnight, Frank grabs the doll of the man who took the photo - an undercover reporter - and jams a pin through its head. The reporter, who is driving, screams and clutches his forehead. His car plunges down a hillside and as Frank burns the doll, the wreckage bursts into flame.

At the 12:30 meeting, Frank announces that Rick's loyalty is now to be tested, and Donna is brought in as a sacrifice. Frank makes Rick spin the wheel, but as it drops, Rick pulls Donna to safety. A fight breaks out. The wheel falls on Frank, killing him. The room catches fire. Rick and Donna escape. Bianca picks up her doll. Everyone else apparently dies.

With fire department sirens wailing, Rick and Donna, a romantic pair again, drive away. "That's the end to it," says Rick. Then Bianca, once again among the clouds, gets in the last word, smiling and saying, "That's what he thinks!"

== Cast ==
- Linda Christian as Bianca Milan
- Robert Alda as Rick Turner
- Ariadna Welter as Donna Trent
- Neil Hamilton as Francis "Frank" Lamont
- Gere Craft as Mary the nurse
- Jeanne Carmen as cult member (listed as "Jeannie" in the credits)
- Julie Scott as cult member
- Diana Spears as cult member
- Gertrude Astor as the elderly cultist
- Bruno VeSota as cult member (listed as "Ve-Sota" in the credits)
- Dick Lee as cult member
- Jim Knight as cult member
- Coleen Vico as cult member
- Roy Wright as the doctor
- Romona Ravez as cult member
- Tony Rock as cult member

== Production ==
The producer of the film was Alvin K. Bublis and Jack Miles was the executive producer. Rick Newberry, Pierre Groleau, Harris Gilbert, and Dave Harney are all listed as associate producers.

Rex Carlton Productions began work on The Devil's Hand in Mexico City in mid-January 1959, but the movie did not have its premiere until September 13, 1961, in San Diego, California, released on a double-bill with Bloodlust! It was filmed in various locations around Los Angeles, including McArthur Park, the storefront at 2534 West 7th Street, which served as the doll shop, and a building at 5907 West Pico Boulevard, used as Belmont Hospital (this was Carthay Studios, where the interiors were shot). The movie opened in Mexico on December 12, 1962 and was also released in Venezuela and West Germany.

Of the production, Linda Christian said, "The picture was shot really quickly. They were having financial problems and wanted to get it in the can. ... I don't think everybody got paid. They owed us quite a bit of money. My sister, Ariadna [Welter] was also in the film ... she said later, 'Never again!' to doing a film in America." By the time The Devil's Hand was released, Welter had starred in 21 films made in her and her sister's native country of Mexico.

== Soundtrack ==
The "Theme from 'The Devil's Hand,'" performed by Baker Harris and the Knightmares, was released as a 45 RPM 7" single on the Chess Records label in July 1961. The song was composed by Allyn Ferguson and Michael Terr and failed to chart on the Billboard Hot 100.

== Reception ==
The few critics who reviewed The Devil's Hand when it was released panned it. Margaret Harford of The Los Angeles Times called it a "sub-standard horror feature" and wrote that "the plot is absurd and performed in dead earnest." She added that "Miss Christian is certainly an eye-opening lass wearing a flimsy negligee; in fact, she models several flimsy negligees, At no time, however, is she quite as transparent as the plot."

BoxOffice magazine's anonymous reviewer said the film was a "tale of woe not to be dismissed lightly by those audience components known to acclaim and accolade all-out stress on the indelicate in man." The reviewer continued, "the production's overall effect is one of ponderous detail as all concerned strive excessively for gruesomeness" and concluded that "the audience should be regulated to adult participation." The magazine's "Exploitip" for exhibitors to drum up business was to "invite a local woman to sit at a special post-midnight screening, appropriately covered by press, radio and TV."

The actors voiced similar disapproval of the film, with star Linda Christian stating, "I liked my part. It was rather glamorous, but I was disappointed when the script was made into a film because it was so superficial. They changed the emphasis from magic and witchcraft to devil worship." Bryan Senn later noted that "according to co-star Ariadna Welter, Robert Alda 'wasn't too pleased with the results' of this picture." Senn agreed with The Los Angeles Times' assessment of the physical appearance of Christian, writing that the "only real point of interest in this threadbare obscurity lay in the astounding beauty of its star, Linda Christian".

Later reviewers also had little praise for The Devil's Hand. British film critic Phil Hardy billed it as "cheaply made" and noted that it "compares distinctly unfavourably" with Hole's Ghost of Dragstrip Hollow (1959), a film Hardy describes as "an inane, virtually plotless mixture of haunted houses, hot-rodders and rock'n'roll". Senn criticizes the film's characterizations, saying it "offers no depth of character anywhere, ignoring whatever tortured reasons caused these people to seek out this 'devil-god of evil.' (None of the bland characters seem as if they've lost their soul - they don't appear interesting enough to have even had one in the first place - and the coven comes across as nothing more than a rather silly and dull after-hours club)." Bill Warren, reviewing a different film, refers in passing to The Devil's Hand as being "as boring a film as I've seen."

== Television release ==
The Devil's Hand went to television little more than a year after its theatrical release, being sold in October 1963 by Westhampton Features, a part of Desilu, as part of a 41-title package. Clips from the film were later used in the "Witches" episode of the 26-episode TV program 100 Years of Horror, which first aired on March 20, 1997.

== Home media ==
The Devil's Hand has long been available for home viewing. VCI Home Video released the movie on VHS in the USA in 1997, and its first domestic release on DVD was by Alpha Video in 2004. The first release outside the USA was by World Editora in Brazil in 2005. In 2009, GoDigital Media released it in "world-wide all-media" form, and Elea Media released it on DVD in Germany in 2016. Other companies have released it on DVD as well. In 2011, Rifftrax released it as streaming video accompanied by their comedic remarks. The DVDs Shiver & Shudder Show in 2002 and The Crown Jewels: America's Oldest Indie Film Company in 2016 both used clips from the movie.
