= Nightmare in Badham County =

- 1976 trade advertisement
- Genre: Drama; Horror; Thriller
- Written by: Jo Heims
- Directed by: John Llewellyn Moxey
- Starring: Deborah Raffin; Lynne Moody; Chuck Connors; Fionnula Flanagan; Robert Reed; Tina Louise; Robert Reed; Della Reese; Lana Wood; Ralph Bellamy
- Theme music composer: Charles Bernstein
- Country of origin: United States
- Original language: English

Production
- Executive producer: Douglas S. Cramer
- Producer: Wilford Lloyd Baumes
- Production locations: Carrollton, Mississippi; Greenwood, Mississippi Moorhead Mississippi
- Cinematography: Frank Stanley
- Editor: Carroll Sax
- Camera setup: Panavision Cameras and Lenses
- Running time: 102 minutes
- Production company: ABC Circle Films

Original release
- Network: ABC
- Release: November 5, 1976

Nightmare in Badham County is a 1976 American women-in-prison television drama horror thriller film directed by John Llewellyn Moxey and starring Deborah Raffin, Lynne Moody, Chuck Connors, Fionnula Flanagan, Robert Reed, Tina Louise, Della Reese, Lana Wood and Ralph Bellamy. Its plot follows two female college students from California who, while traveling cross-country, are remanded to a women's prison farm in a corrupt Southern town.

The film was so popular in China that it was released in cinemas and Raffin became the first Western actress to make a promotional tour of the country, after which she became an unofficial ambassador helping China make deals with Hollywood.

== Plot ==
While driving on a cross-country summer trip, two UCLA students, Cathy and Diane, get a flat tire in a rural Southern community. A local, George, helps the women put on the spare tire, during which they are confronted by the local sheriff, Slim Danen, who is standoffish toward the women. The women again rebuff Danen at a diner while getting their car fixed. After being told their car's fuel pump needs to be replaced, the women leave the car at the shop overnight and camp in the woods. In the middle of the night, Danen arrives and arrests the women for trespassing, and remands them to the county jail.

That night, Danen sexually assaults Diane while Cathy witnesses the attack from a separate cell. At their hearing the next day, the corrupt local judge informs Cathy and Diane that they owe a significant amount of money for their car repairs, which both contest. During the hearing, Diane tells the judge that Danen raped her. The women are subsequently sent to Badham County Farm, a working prison farm, to serve a 30-day sentence. There they are overseen by Superintendent Dancer and three female guards, Dulcie, Smitty, and the most brutal, Greer. Cathy is horrified when she learns that the women's residence halls are racially segregated, resulting in Cathy being housed with all white women, and Diane placed in an all-black ward.

Cathy and Diane witness a number of atrocities committed at the farm, including the guards humiliating and abusing the inmates, and using racial epithets. Diane is taken under the wing of Sara, a longtime inmate at the farm. Cathy's sentence is extended by sixty days after she is implicated in a fight while working in the fields. A short time later, Cathy and several other inmates are allowed to leave for the day to serve drinks and wait on members of the local high society at an elite party, under the supervision of Dancer. Cathy attempts to ask for help from numerous attendees, but they all ignore her pleas. In the house, Cathy surreptitiously attempts to phone her parents in Philadelphia, but is caught by Dulcie. Dulcie, who is sympathetic to Cathy, only gives a mere warning, but after Smitty and Greer hear of the attempt, they bind Cathy's arms in the middle of the night and flagellate her.

Diane attempts to flee the prison by hiding on a bus transferring visitors back to town, but is caught and placed in solitary confinement. While delivering produce from the farm to the local diner, Cathy pleads with a waitress there to contact her parents, and writes down their contact information. The waitress, who remembers Cathy and Diane eating at the diner, is sympathetic to her. When leaving town in the prison truck, Cathy watches as the gas station proprietor passes by in her car. Later that night, Smitty confronts Cathy with the note she wrote to the waitress, and threatens Cathy with an extended sentence if she attempts to escape again.

Together, Cathy and Diane manage to devise an escape attempt together, planning to retrieve Cathy's car in town, which has a spare key hidden beneath the bumper. Diane distracts Danen by speeding with Cathy's car, allowing Cathy enough time to call her parents from a phone booth. The plan works as Cathy is able to reach her family, but Diane subsequently goes missing. Cathy's father arrives the next day to pick her up, and Cathy demands that Diane be freed, but Danen and Dancer refute having any knowledge of her whereabouts, insisting she escaped. After she is freed from the farm, Cathy runs to the work fields with her father in pursuit and finds Sara. She asks her if she has seen Diane.

At that moment, the guards arrive, including Greer, who threatens Sara with her leather strap. Sara stands up to Greer this time and warns her not to do it. Greer lunges towards Sara, who grabs her arm and holds her in a half-nelson, rendering Greer helpless. Cathy screams for Sara to stop, fearing that her acts will result in dire consequences. Sara releases her hold after snapping Greer's neck.

Sara drops Greer to the ground and tearfully informs Cathy that she witnessed the workers burying Diane's body in an unmarked grave, among various others belonging to inmates who attempted to escape.

== Cast ==
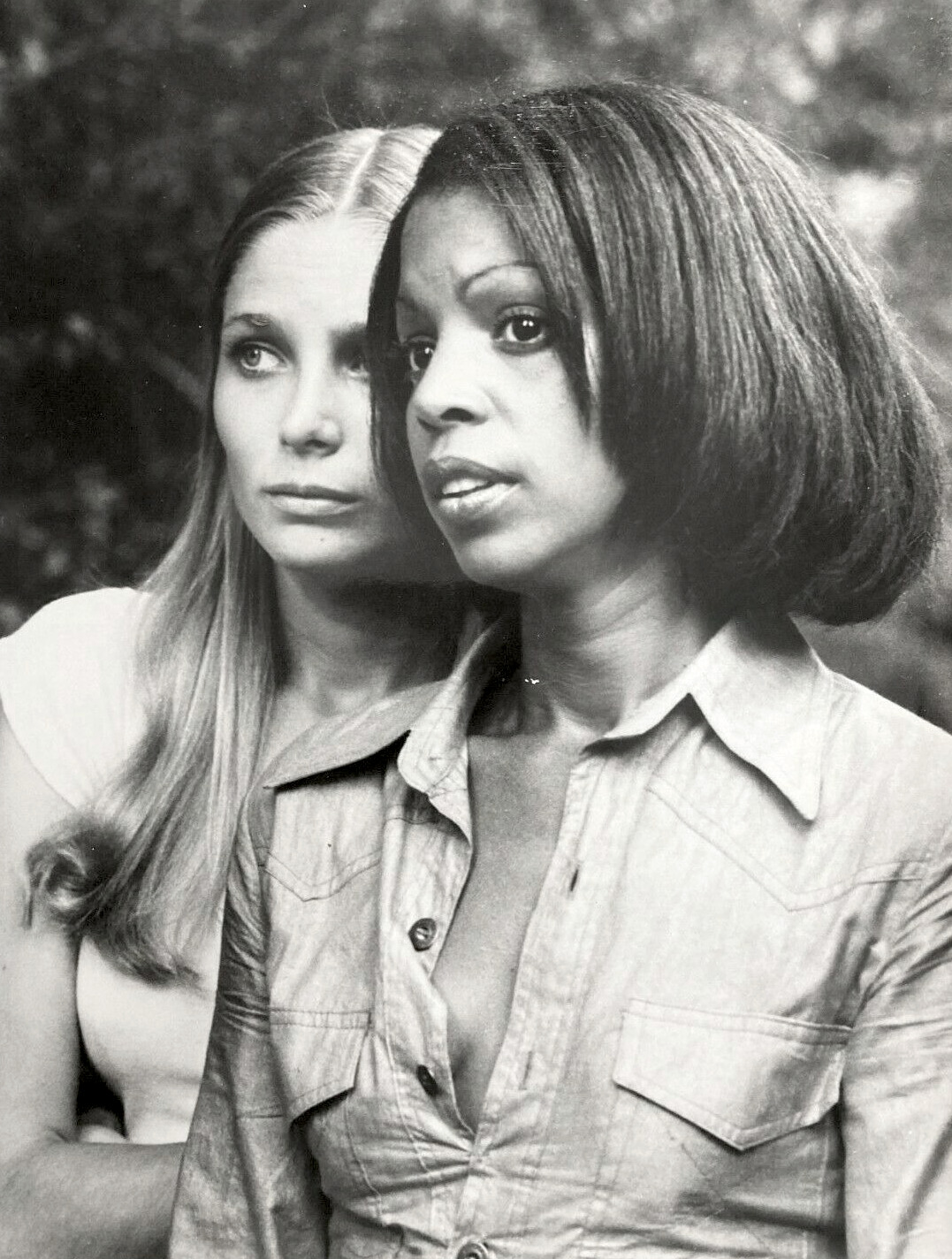
Deborah Raffin and Lynne Moody in Nightmare in Badham County

- Deborah Raffin as Cathy Phillips
- Lynne Moody as Diane Emery
- Chuck Connors as Sheriff Slim Danen
- Fionnula Flanagan as Dulcie (as Fionnuala Flanagan)
- Tina Louise as Greer
- Robert Reed as Supt. Dancer
- Della Reese as Sara
- Lana Wood as Smitty
- Ralph Bellamy as Judge
- Leslie Albers as Waitress
- Denise Dillaway as Inmate
- Simpson Hemphill as Governor's aide
- Annette Henley as Inmate
- Tom Keith as Gas Station Attendant
- Mary Ann Kohler as Inmate
- John Malloy as Mr. Phillips
- Thomas Hal Phillips as The Mayor(as Hal Thomas Phillips)
- John Clyde Rober Jr. as Restaurant Manager
- Essex Smith as George
- Tonea Stewart as Alma (as Tommie Stewart)
- Rebecca Taylor as Inmate
- Kim Wilson as Emiline

== Production and background ==
When ABC executive Brandon Stoddard was presented with the project he found its "white slavery aspect" one of its most compelling features, while another executive found some of the content "rough and sexually explicit." Douglas Cramer, the executive producer, told him that material was meant for the overseas market, and would not be shown in the United States. Cramer also added that particular material was not something he approved of or condoned. Nude footage and catfights had been filmed for its theatrical release in the European market. Film critic Todd Tjersland said that "this is indisputably the sleaziest, nastiest film ever financed by a major television network."

In the United States, seven ABC affiliates refused to air the movie due to it being "excessively violent". One of those stations, WAST-TV, in Albany, New York, said "it is our obligation to determine what is violence for violence's sake", while WCVB-TV in Boston stated "racial tension connected with school integration in Boston, combined with the film's violence and rape" were the reasons they rejected the film."

Deborah Raffin said it was "the best role" she had ever been offered: "It gave me a chance, I hope, to show some depth and emotion."

== Release ==
The film was released in the United States as an ABC movie-of-the-week in 1976, while an extended theatrical cut, running 100 minutes, was released internationally.

=== China release ===
In 1979, China and the United States had entered into discussions in order to help establish a diplomatic relationship. Popular Cinema magazine run by the China Film Association, and supervised by the China Federation of Literary and Art Circles, was given permission to introduce a few American films to welcome the establishment of the bilateral ties. However, the only films that could be considered for distribution in China were those that portrayed "serious social contradictions and crisis of the American society." In their view, Popular Cinema had identified Badham County, as a film that "disclosed the darkness of America’s legal system and attacked the hypocrisy of bourgeois democracy and human rights."

When the film finally premiered in China, it became a "monster hit", with an estimated 150 million people going to see it. It also gave Deborah Raffin an instant celebrity status, and she became the first American movie star to make a publicity tour of the country. Raffin recalled that as she toured the country, people would recognize her and point to her, and start shouting "Nightmare! Nightmare! " She went on to say that "it was a fortunate fluke for me, because at the time the Chinese were essentially relegated to buying small independent films, television movies or cheap exploitation pictures."

American film producer Janet Yang, who had recently got a job at the Chinese Foreign Languages Press in Beijing, first saw the movie there in 1980. She recalled that after she had watched the movie, people would come up to her and say "it's so terrible that you have to live in such a place."

== Reception ==
Moina Murphy, from The Hollywood Reporter, wrote that "despite the clichés of the genre, characters and dialogue, the movie is effective small screen fare; it is a brutal story because many of its people are brutal, but it is illuminated by a belief in love, respect and courage that raises it to a high level of dramatic experience." Film critic Joan Hanauer commented that the film is "flirting with soft core porn ... there's no question that Badham has a dreadful fascination, particularly since its excellent cast does an outstanding job; without some expert performances, Badham might have been reduced from frightening to frightfully funny, which would have disarmed it."

In his review for the White Crane Journal, Eric Riley opined that "it is your typical women-in-prison movie, full of lesbians shanking people and sage advice from old Della who'd been in there all her life; the line I can never forget is from the dyke guard who said, it's so damn hot here, while she's taking off all her clothes; it's so hot the only thing I can think about is fried chicken and sex." He said the people who were watching the film with him, laughed at how bad that line was.

Film critic John O'Connor opined that "innocent viewers were treated to two hours of relentless sado-masochistic titillation, overseen by tough woman guards decked out in halters and high-powered rifles; inmates were killed and secretly buried; others were brutally beaten; broad hints of lesbianism were added for good measure; and prime-time TV, in the exploitative manner of an old American International film, chalked up still another milestone in its tireless effort to serve the public interest, convenience and necessity."

Los Angeles Times film critic Kevin Thomas stated "the film is all but unbearable to watch; Raffin and Moody are both excellent, as is Della Reese in a particularly affecting portrayal as a resigned yet strong and loving woman who tries to protect Moody; Connors is a terrifying convincing figure of pure evil, as is Robert Reed, the prison warden; the film which wisely carries a parental discretion tag, is a portrait of hell on earth."

== Awards and nominations ==
Della Reese was nominated for an Emmy for Best Supporting Actress for her portrayal of Sara, and Deborah Raffin was nominated for an Emmy for Best Actress.

== See also ==
- Cinema of China
- List of LGBTQ-related films of 1976
- List of made-for-television films with LGBTQ characters
- List of feature films with lesbian characters

== Sources ==
- Dean, Tanya (2002). "God Loves You". Della Reese. Black Americans of Achievement. Philadelphia: Chelsea House Publishers. ISBN 0-7910-6291-0.
- Levine, Elena (2014). "New Sexual Culture of American Television". In Schaefer, Eric (ed.). Sex Scene: Media And The Sexual Revolution. Duke University Press. ISBN 978-0-8223-5642-4.
- McCann, Bob (2009). Encyclopedia of African American Actresses in Film and Television. Jefferson, North Carolina: McFarland. ISBN 978-0-786-45804-2.
- Parish, James Robert (2000) [1991]. Prison Pictures from Hollywood. Jefferson, North Carolina: McFarland & Company. ISBN 0-7864-0939-8.
