= Emile Meyer =

American actor (1910–1987)

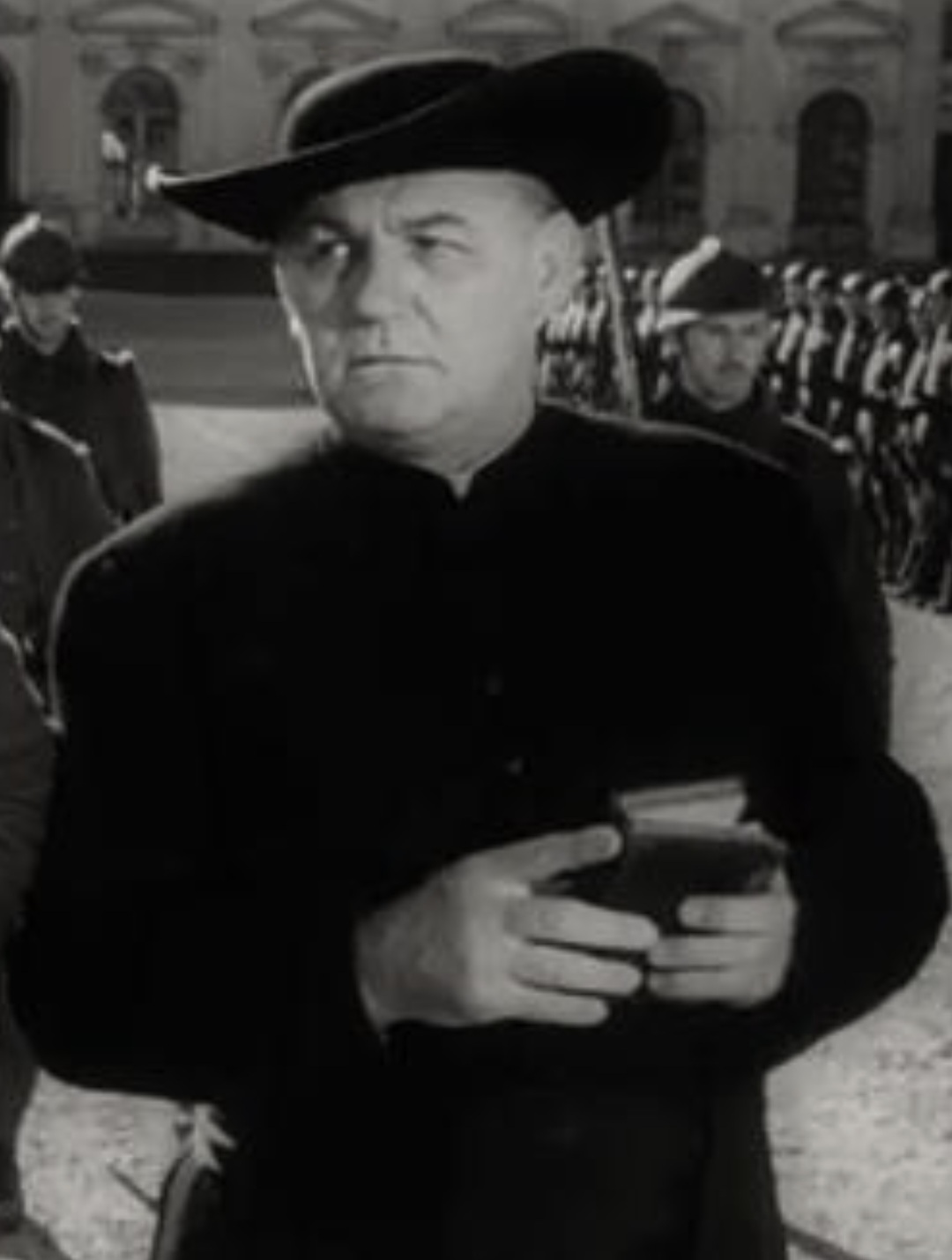
- Meyer in Paths of Glory (1957)
- Born: August 18, 1910; New Orleans, Louisiana, U.S.
- Died: March 19, 1987 (aged 76); Slidell, Louisiana, U.S.
- Occupation: Actor
- Years active: 1950–1977

Emile Meyer (August 18, 1910 – March 19, 1987) was an American actor, usually known for tough, aggressive, authoritative characters in Hollywood films from the 1950s era, mostly in Westerns or thrillers.

== Career ==
Meyer had an uncredited, small speaking role as a sea captain in Panic in the Streets (1950) after Elia Kazan discovered him in a theatrical production in New Orleans. Meyer provided such noteworthy performances as Rufus Ryker, the cattle baron who brings in a hired killer in Shane (1953), as the belligerent Mr Halloran in Blackboard Jungle (1955), cast-against-type by Stanley Kubrick as Father Dupree in Paths of Glory (1957), and the corrupt cop Harry Kello, who intends to "chastise" Tony Curtis in Sweet Smell of Success (1957), his most frequently remembered role today.

He also appeared on television, including a guest spot on John Payne's The Restless Gun and as a truculently stubborn juror opposite James Garner in the 1957 Maverick episode "Rope of Cards", among several other supporting appearances in various roles during the course of the series. His guest appearance on the Restless Gun episode "Man and Boy" in 1957 included filming on the Iverson Movie Ranch in Chatsworth, Los Angeles, California. In 1959 he appeared on Wagon Train S2 E22 "The Jasper Cato Story" as Captain John Pederson, who defends a member of his crew in a memorable court scene. His final film role was in The Legend of Frank Woods (1977).

== Death ==
On March 19, 1987, Meyer died at North Shore Regional Medical Center in Slidell, Louisiana. He was 76 and had suffered from Alzheimer's disease.

== Partial filmography ==
- Panic in the Streets (1950) as Capt. Beauclyde, Master of Nile Queen (uncredited)
- Tomorrow Is Another Day (1951) as Welder (uncredited)
- The Guy Who Came Back (1951) as Police Guard (uncredited)
- The People Against O'Hara (1951) as Capt. Tom Mulvaney
- The Mob (1951) as Gas Station Attendant (uncredited)
- The Sea Hornet (1951) as Harrie (uncredited)
- Cattle Queen (1951) as Shotgun Thompson
- The Big Night (1951) as Peckinpaugh
- The Wild North (1952) as Jake (uncredited)
- Boots Malone (1952) as Racetrack Security Guard (uncredited)
- Shadow in the Sky (1952) as Bartender (uncredited)
- Carbine Williams (1952) as Head Guard (uncredited)
- Glory Alley (1952) as General (uncredited)
- We're Not Married! (1952) as Beauty Contest Announcer (uncredited)
- Hurricane Smith (1952) as Capt. Raikes
- Bloodhounds of Broadway (1952) as Skipper (uncredited)
- Girls in the Night (1953) as Police Officer Kovacs
- Shane (1953) as Rufus Ryker
- Sangaree (1953) as Angry Townsman (uncredited)
- The Farmer Takes a Wife (1953) as Storekeeper (uncredited)
- Riot in Cell Block 11 (1954) as Warden Reynolds
- Drums Across the River (1954) as Nathan Marlowe
- Silver Lode (1954) as Sheriff Wooley
- Shield for Murder (1954) as Capt. Gunnarson
- The Human Jungle (1954) as Police Chief Abe Rowan
- White Feather (1955) as Magruder
- Blackboard Jungle (1955) as Mr. Halloran
- Stranger on Horseback (1955) as Sheriff Nat Bell
- The Tall Men (1955) as Chickasaw Charlie
- The Girl in the Red Velvet Swing (1955) as Hunchbacher
- Man with the Gun (1955) as Saul Atkins
- The Man with the Golden Arm (1955) as Detective Bednar
- Raw Edge (1956) as Pop Penny
- The Maverick Queen (1956) as Leo Malone
- Gun the Man Down (1956) as Sheriff Morton
- Badlands of Montana (1957) as Henry Harrison Hammer
- Sweet Smell of Success (1957) as Lt. Harry Kello
- The Delicate Delinquent (1957) as Sgt. Kelly (uncredited)
- Paths of Glory (1957) as Father Duprée
- Baby Face Nelson (1957) as Mac, Detective
- The Lineup (1958) as Insp. Al Quine
- The Case Against Brooklyn (1958) as Police Capt. T.W. Wills
- The Fiend Who Walked the West (1958) as Ames
- Revolt in the Big House (1958) as Warden
- Good Day for a Hanging (1959) as Marshal Hiram Cain
- King of the Wild Stallions (1959) as Matt Macguire
- The Threat (1960) as Duncan
- The Girl in Lovers Lane (1960) as Cal Anders
- Young Jesse James (1960) as Maj. Charlie Quantrill
- The George Raft Story (1961) as Detective Captain (uncredited)
- Move Over, Darling (1963) as Process Server (uncredited)
- Taggart (1964) as Ben Blazer
- Young Dillinger (1965) as Det. Jergins
- Hostile Guns (1967) as Uncle Joe Reno
- A Time for Killing (1967) as Col. Harries
- The Hardy Boys: The Mystery of the Chinese Junk (1967) as Burke
- Buckskin (1968) as Corbin
- More Dead Than Alive (1969) as Bartender
- A Time for Dying (1969) (uncredited)
- The Outfit (1973) as Amos Hopper
- Macon County Line (1974) as Gurney
- The Legend of Frank Woods (1977) as Sheriff Dooley (final film role)
