= Breezy =

1973 film directed by Clint Eastwood

- Theatrical release poster, artwork by Ted CoConis
- Directed by: Clint Eastwood
- Written by: Jo Heims
- Produced by: Robert Daley
- Starring: William Holden; Kay Lenz
- Cinematography: Frank Stanley
- Edited by: Ferris Webster
- Music by: Michel Legrand
- Production company: The Malpaso Company
- Distributed by: Universal Pictures
- Release dates: November 16, 1973 (Los Angeles); November 18, 1973 (New York City)
- Running time: 106 minutes
- Country: United States
- Language: English
- Budget: $750,000
- Box office: $17,753

Breezy is a 1973 American romantic drama film directed by Clint Eastwood, produced by Robert Daley, and written by Jo Heims. The film stars William Holden and Kay Lenz, with Roger C. Carmel, Marj Dusay, and Joan Hotchkis in supporting roles. It is the third film directed by Eastwood and the first without him starring in it.

Distributed by Universal Pictures, Breezy was theatrically released in Los Angeles on November 16, 1973, and in New York City on November 18, 1973. The film earned 3 nominations at the 31st Golden Globe Awards, including Most Promising Newcomer – Female for Lenz. The film was not a commercial success.

== Plot ==
A young couple awakens in bed after a one-night stand. Edith Alice "Breezy" Breezerman hops out of bed, gets dressed, and steps into the daylight. Breezy lost her parents years before in a car accident; she lived with her aunt until she graduated from high school. A year later, she left for California, where she is a homeless, free-spirited, carefree hippie spending her nights couch surfing.

That same morning, Frank Harmon bids farewell to his overnight guest, a blonde who is attracted to him, but he only humors her as she leaves. Middle-aged, divorced and wealthy from his work in real estate, Frank has no joy in his life.

After escaping a bad hitchhiking experience with an unstable stranger, Breezy loiters near Frank's luxurious house. When he leaves for work, she invites herself into his car and insists that he give her a ride to her destination, annoying him. She returns to his house that evening to retrieve the guitar that she left in his car earlier in the day. She persuades him to let her shower and then tries to get him to invite her to stay the night, but he does not go for it. The next night, he is awakened by police at the door. They found Breezy wandering around and she told them that Frank was her uncle and that they had argued earlier. After chastising Frank, the police leave, and he offers her something to eat. She begs for him to take her to the ocean, and he does. Later, he carries her in to the guest room as she feigns sleep. Before he goes to bed, she says that she loves him. After waking up, he is disappointed to discover that she left without saying goodbye.

The next day, when he comes home from work, she is waiting for him by his door. He invites her in but says that he must make an appearance at a friend's wedding reception and drop off the papers for the house the couple just bought from him. He says that she could stay and they make plans for his return. He is much later than anticipated and is disappointed that she does not appear to be there. He gets ready for bed and when he is in his room, he sees her in his bed and they have sex. In the morning he is very upbeat. The two spend the day together; he buys her clothes before they go to dinner and run into his ex-wife, who acts aggressive towards them. Another night, the couple goes to see a movie and runs into Frank's friend Bob who seems to always talk about wanting to cheat on his wife. Frank is embarrassed and self conscious to be seen with Breezy.

He is conflicted about his feelings for longtime, ex-girlfriend Betty Tobin who remains in his orbit socially. She clearly loved him, and he realizes too late that he was too self-involved to love her back though he should have. She lets him know that she is marrying someone else.

Frank's friend and workout buddy Bob Henderson is grappling with his own mid-life crisis. He is restless, but afraid to end his now-loveless marriage and face loneliness. He sees Frank with Breezy one night at the movies and while ogling the girl, admits that being with someone so young might make him feel like a "child molester". On another night they run into his ex-wife in a restaurant, who taunts him. All this sends Frank into a tailspin of conflict and embarrassment. The joy he has reluctantly found with Breezy is not enough to enable him to cope with the age difference. He breaks up with her and she drifts back to her old friends, vagrant friends.

When Betty is injured and her new husband is killed in a car accident, Frank visits her in the hospital and has a change of heart. He races off to find Breezy.

== Cast ==
- William Holden as Frank Harmon
- Kay Lenz as Edith Alice 'Breezy' Breezerman
- Roger C. Carmel as Bob Henderson
- Marj Dusay as Betty Tobin
- Joan Hotchkis as Paula Harmon
- Lynn Borden as Harmon's Overnight Date
- Shelley Morrison as Nancy Henderson
- Eugene Peterson as Charlie
- Richard Bull as Doctor
- Clint Eastwood as Man in Crowd on Pier (uncredited cameo)

== Production ==
Eastwood has described the film as a "big risk at the time" and that Universal Studios let him make the film as a favor. Eastwood "liked the whole comment on the rejuvenation of a cynic" who finds out about life through a seventeen-year-old girl, with her teaching him more about life than he does for her. Eastwood said at the time that he didn't believe the film would "make a dime" but that he was making the movie because he wanted the challenge, and because the material was different than what he was used to. Holden had not made a major film since The Wild Bunch in 1969, and he was so happy to be approached that he agreed to appear in the film for no salary, receiving instead a percentage of the profits. When the film generated no profits, the Screen Actors Guild told Eastwood that he would have to pay Holden the union minimum of $4000.

Jo Heims wrote the script about a love blossoming between a middle-aged man and a teenage girl. Heims had originally intended Eastwood to play the starring role of the realtor Frank Harmon, a bitter divorced man who falls in love with the young Breezy. Although Eastwood confessed to "understanding the Frank Harmon character" he believed he was too young at that stage to play Harmon. That part would go to William Holden, 12 years Eastwood's senior, and Eastwood then decided to direct the picture. Eastwood initially wanted to cast Jo Ann Harris, with whom he had worked in The Beguiled. Eastwood described Holden as "very astute as an actor" and that he "understood the role completely, so it was easy for him to play." After he signed for the part, Holden said to Eastwood, "You know, I've been that guy," and Eastwood responded, "Yeah, I thought so."

Casting the role of Breezy was difficult because the role was young, seventeen according to the script, and nude scenes were required. Screen tests were performed with ten actresses, all with Holden. Eastwood later remarked that it was unusual that Holden was in the screen tests with all the actresses, and that "most guys would say, 'get me some kid.' " The role of Breezy went to a young dark-haired actress named Kay Lenz, chosen because of her chemistry with Holden, who Eastwood described as "very very gentle with her, even during the screen test." According to friends of Eastwood, he became infatuated with Lenz during this period. Lenz had limited experience but approached her role energetically. Eastwood gave her veto power over nude scenes. Unless she approved them, he would not include them in the final cut.

Filming for Breezy began in November 1972 in Los Angeles and finished five weeks later. With Bruce Surtees, Eastwood's regular cinematographer, occupied elsewhere, Frank Stanley was brought in to shoot the picture, the first of four films he would shoot for Malpaso. The film was shot very quickly and efficiently and in the end went $1 million under budget and finished three days before schedule.

Holden's son Scott Holden plays a small role as a veterinarian, in his final attempt at an acting career.

== Reception ==
Howard Thompson of The New York Times wrote, "A cloyingly naive resolution mars 'Breezy,' which opened yesterday, an otherwise engrossing drama of an aging man's infatuation with a tender-hearted 17-year-old girl derelict." Gene Siskel of the Chicago Tribune gave the film 3 stars out of 4 and wrote, "Screenwriter Jo Heims has fashioned a formula May–September love affair into a surprisingly tender and frequently witty romance in which an older man is realistically transformed by a much younger woman ... 'Breezy' frequently threatens to collapse into a stereotypical characterization, but Holden's refreshing honesty invariably revitalizes the action. In the title role, newcomer Kay Lenz is sincere, often believable, and rarely maudlin." Arthur D. Murphy of Variety called it "an okay contemporary drama" with "perhaps too much ironic, wry or broad humor for solid impact." Kevin Thomas of the Los Angeles Times wrote of Eastwood that Breezy was "a deeply felt, fully realized film that is entirely his own. It's an offbeat love story told with rare delicacy and perception that affords William Holden his most fully dimensioned role in years and introduces a smashing newcomer named Kay Lenz."

The film opened at the Columbia II theater in New York City on November 18, 1973, but flopped, grossing only $16,099 in four weeks and 5 days. Early unfavorable reviews and the poor performance caused the studio to shelve the film. It then underwent some minor re-editing and was test released in Utah in 39 theaters on July 3, 1974, on a four wall distribution basis for two weeks. The results were positive, so Universal expanded the four wall distribution policy to the Portland and Seattle areas. During 1974, Variety tracked it grossing $140,289 in 20-24 key cities in the United States and Canada, placing it 301st on the list of their films tracked for the year, which with its gross from New York in 1973, gave it a gross of at least $156,388. Eastwood thought Universal had decided the film was going to fail long before it was released. He said "the public stayed away from it because it wasn't promoted enough, and it was sold in an uninteresting fashion". Some critics, including Eastwood's biographer Richard Schickel, believed that the sexual content of the film and love scenes were too soft to be memorable for such a potentially scandalous relationship between Harmon and Breezy, commenting that, "it is not a sexy movie. Once again, Eastwood was too polite in his eroticism." However, Schickel claimed that Breezy managed to recoup its low budget. On Rotten Tomatoes, it holds a score of 63% based on 8 reviews with a mean of 7.2 of a possible 10.

== Home media release ==
Breezy did not reach home video until 1998. Universal Pictures released the film to DVD in 2004 with a running time of 106 minutes (NTSC). A Blu-ray was released in 2014 by the British branch of Universal, which was issuing all their Clint Eastwood catalogue on HD. The film is in widescreen and Dolby Digital 2.0 Mono. In the US, it was released on Blu-ray from Kino Lorber in August 2020.

== See also ==
- List of American films of 1973

== Bibliography ==
- Hughes, Howard (2009). Aim for the Heart. London: I.B. Tauris. ISBN 978-1-84511-902-7.
- McGilligan, Patrick (1999). Clint: The Life and Legend. London: HarperCollins. ISBN 0-00-638354-8.
