= Alan Surgal =

American screenwriter (1916–2017)

- Born: November 12, 1916; Chicago, Illinois, U.S.
- Died: January 3, 2017 (aged 100); Beverly Hills, California, U.S.
- Education: University of Chicago
- Occupation: Screenwriter
- Spouse: Florence Small
- Relatives: William J. Small (brother-in-law)

Alan Surgal (November 12, 1916 – January 3, 2017) was an American screenwriter best known for penning the screenplay for the 1965 surrealistic dramatic film, Mickey One, which was directed by Arthur Penn and starred Warren Beatty.

== Early life ==
Surgal was born in 1916 in Chicago, Illinois, and attended the University of Chicago. He was stationed in London as a writer for the Armed Forces Network and Yank during World War II.

== Career ==
Surgal worked as a writer for the BBC during the war. He then moved to New York City following the end of World War II, where he wrote scripts for radio (and co-creating the radio show, This Is the Underground), before transitioning to television scripts. He penned several episodes for the early NBC television series, Robert Montgomery Presents, including screen adaptations of Arrowsmith and The Canterville Ghost.

Surgal became best known for his screenplay for Arthur Penn's 1965 surrealistic dramatic film, Mickey One. To craft the script for Mickey One, Surgal borrowed from his lengthy career as both a dramatic writer as well as a television comedy writer for Victor Borge, Bob Hope, Red Skelton, and Danny Thomas. While the film, which was released during a New York newspaper strike, initially flopped at the box office, Mickey One is now considered a cult classic, according to The Hollywood Reporter. Director Martin Scorsese later supervised the restoration of the film by the UCLA Film and Television Archive.

Surgal moved to Los Angeles, California in 1978, where he continued to work as a television producer and writer.

== Personal life and death ==
Surgal married Florence Small, a film producer and the sister of former NBC News and United Press International president William J. Small.

Alan Surgal died at his home in Beverly Hills, California, on January 3, 2017, at the age of 100. He was survived by his wife of 80 years, Florence Small. The couple had two sons, Jon Surgal, a 1985 graduate of Columbia College, and Tom Surgal.
