= William J. Small =

American television journalist and executive (1926–2020)

- Born: September 20, 1926; Chicago, Illinois, US
- Died: May 24, 2020 (aged 93); Manhattan, New York City, US
- Spouse: Gish June Small (1929–2005)

William Jack Small (September 20, 1926 – May 24, 2020) was an American broadcast journalist, executive, author, and educator.

== Early life and family background ==
William J. Small was born September 20, 1926, in Chicago, Illinois. He served in the US military during WWII, in Leyte, The Philippines. He attended Marshall High School and The University of Chicago.

== Career ==
According to the authorized biography issued by The National Academy of Television Arts & Sciences (NATAS), William J. Small spent most of his professional life in broadcast journalism. After serving as News Director of stations WLS in Chicago and WHAS in Louisville, KY, he was named Washington Bureau Chief for CBS News in 1962.

The CBS Washington bureau of the '60s and '70s was perhaps the single most important entity in the development of modern television news before the era of cable. Bill Small, as bureau chief, was a crucial figure in the bureau, and hence played a major role in the development of modern broadcast journalism.

Roger Mudd, in his 2009 book “The Place to Be: Washington, CBS, and the Glory Days of Television News” describes Small's role at CBS as follows: “Brought in from a middling market in Kentucky, and plunked down in the center of the most important news city in the world, Small was told to get ready for the biggest expansion in the news division’s history. Backed by the mystique of Murrow’s CBS and his own uncanny judge of talent, Small helped attract a stream of reporters, analysts and producers whose learning, talent, skill and experience were without precedent in news broadcasting.” “Small,” states Mudd, “put together a TV News bureau the likes of which Washington had never known.” Among Small's many hires at CBS and elsewhere were: Marvin Kalb, Dan Rather, Bob Schieffer, Ed Bradley, Lesley Stahl, Diane Sawyer, Susan Zirinsky, Tom Bettag, Connie Chung, Martha Teichner, and Bernard Shaw.

In 1974, Small became Senior Vice President of CBS News, based in New York. In 1978, Small was named Corporate Vice President in Washington, DC. In 1979, Mr. Small was named President of NBC News. In 1982, he became President of United Press International (UPI), the nation's second largest news agency.

He was the Felix E. Larkin Professor of Communications and Director for the Center for Communications at Fordham University's Graduate School of Business from 1986 to 1997. He also served as a Dean of Fordham's Graduate School of Business in the years 1992 to 1994.

Small served as Chairman of the News and Documentary Emmy Awards from 2000 to 2010. During his tenure, he made numerous improvements to the competition, including revamping the submission categories and category structure to better reflect the current state of the industry at the time. In addition, Small was the driving force behind the creation of a Lifetime Achievement Award for News & Documentary, which is now the centerpiece of each year's News & Documentary Emmy ceremony. In 2014, Small was honored for his contributions to broadcast journalism and his defense of the First Amendment as the recipient of the Lifetime Achievement Award for News & Documentary.

Among the other awards Small has received are the James Madison Award of the National Broadcast Editorial Association, the Paul White Award (highest award of the Radio-TV News Directors Association), and the Wells Key Award (highest award of the Society of Professional Journalists). He has twice received the Society's Distinguished Service Award for Research in Journalism.

The author of two award-winning books, To Kill a Messenger: Television and the Real World (Hasting House, NY, 1970) and Political Power and the Press (W.W. Norton, NY, 1972), he has served as the National President of the Radio-TV News Directors Association and the Society of Professional Journalists, Sigma Delta Chi. He has been on the executive board of the National Association of Broadcasters and the Washington Journalism Center.

Small has a master's degree from the University of Chicago and was the recipient of the Professional Achievement Award of the university's Alumni Association in 1986. In 2002 he received an honorary doctorate from Muhlenberg College. In 2003 he received an honorary degree from Fordham University. Small died on May 24, 2020, at the age of 93.

== Works ==
- Small, William J. (1972). Political Power of the Press. New York: Norton. ISBN 9780393053395. OCLC 918523074.
- Small, William J. (1979). To Kill A Messenger: Television and the Real World. New York: Hastings House Publishing. OCLC 247195087.
