= Play Misty for Me =

1971 psychological thriller film by Clint Eastwood

- Theatrical release poster
- Directed by: Clint Eastwood
- Screenplay by: Jo Heims; Dean Riesner
- Story by: Jo Heims
- Produced by: Robert Daley
- Starring: Clint Eastwood; Jessica Walter; Donna Mills; John Larch
- Cinematography: Bruce Surtees
- Edited by: Carl Pingitore
- Music by: Dee Barton
- Production company: The Malpaso Company
- Distributed by: Universal Pictures
- Release date: October 20, 1971
- Running time: 102 minutes
- Country: United States
- Language: English
- Budget: $725,000
- Box office: $10.6 million

Play Misty for Me is a 1971 American neo noir psychological thriller film directed by and starring Clint Eastwood in his directorial debut. Jessica Walter and Donna Mills co-star. The screenplay, written by regular Eastwood collaborators Jo Heims and Dean Riesner, follows a radio disc jockey being stalked by an obsessed female fan.

The film was a critical and financial success, with Walter earning praise for her first major film role, including a Golden Globe nomination for Best Actress in a Motion Picture – Drama.

== Plot ==
Dave Garver is a KRML radio disc jockey who broadcasts nightly from a studio in Carmel-by-the-Sea, California, often incorporating poetry into his program. After work at his favorite bar, playing a nonsensical game involving corks and bottle caps with the barman, he deliberately attracts the attention of a woman named Evelyn Draper. Garver drives Draper home, where she reveals that her presence in the bar was not accidental; it was she in fact who sought him out after hearing the bar mentioned on his radio show. He guesses correctly that she is the recurring caller who always requests the jazz standard "Misty". They have sex.

A casual relationship begins between Dave and Evelyn. But before long, Evelyn begins to display obsessive behavior and volatile personality traits that alarm Dave. She shows up at Dave's house uninvited, follows him to work, and calls to demand that he not leave her alone for a single minute. The final straw comes when a jealous Evelyn disrupts a business meeting, mistaking Dave's lunch companion for his date and ruining a major opportunity for his career.

His efforts to gently sever ties with Evelyn lead her to attempt suicide in his home by slashing her wrists. After Dave rejects her again for trying to blackmail him with her injuries, Evelyn breaks into his home and his housekeeper Birdie finds her vandalizing his possessions. Evelyn stabs Birdie (who is hospitalized but survives) and is subsequently committed to a psychiatric hospital.

During Evelyn's incarceration, Dave rekindles a relationship with his ex-girlfriend Tobie Williams. A few months later, Evelyn again calls the studio to request "Misty". She tells Dave that she has been released and is moving to Hawaii for a fresh start in life. She then quotes the Edgar Allan Poe poem "Annabel Lee". That night, while Dave is asleep, Evelyn sneaks into his house and attempts to kill him with a knife, but he fends her off and she escapes. Dave has a detective, McCallum, tap his phone in case she contacts him again.

Dave tells Tobie about Evelyn and cautions Tobie to stay away from him until the woman is caught; she agrees. Unknown to him, Evelyn has already become Tobie’s new roommate, "Annabel". Tobie realizes that Annabel is Evelyn when she sees the scars on Evelyn's wrists, but before Tobie can escape, Evelyn ties up Tobie and gags her. When McCallum arrives at Tobie's house for a welfare check, Evelyn fatally stabs him with a pair of scissors.

Dave makes the connection between Tobie's roommate and the poem. When he calls Tobie to warn her, Evelyn answers and says that she and Tobie are waiting for him. Dave switches from a live show to taped music and rushes to the house, where he finds Tobie bound. As he approaches her, Evelyn attacks him with her knife, slashing Dave multiple times in the darkened house. On the third assault, Dave punches Evelyn in the face, knocking her backwards through the glass window and on to the balcony; she falls over a railing and then down onto the rocky shore below, to her death. A wounded Dave returns to the house and unties Tobie, and the two of them leave the house as his voice on the radio show leads into the song "Misty".

== Cast ==
- Clint Eastwood as Dave Garver
- Jessica Walter as Evelyn Draper
- Donna Mills as Tobie Williams
- John Larch as Sgt. McCallum
- Jack Ging as Frank
- Irene Hervey as Madge
- James McEachin as Al Monte
- Clarice Taylor as Birdie
- Donald Siegel as Murphy
- Duke Everts as Jay Jay
- Jack Kosslyn as Cabbie
- Britt Lind as Angelica

Jazz musicians Johnny Otis, Joe Zawinul, and Cannonball Adderley appear as themselves in scenes shot at the real-life 1970 Monterey Jazz Festival.

== Production ==
The script was conceived by Jo Heims, a former model and dancer turned secretary, and was polished by Dean Riesner. The story was acquired by Ross Hunter while at Universal Pictures.

Before Malpaso Productions co-founder Irving Leonard died, he and Eastwood discussed a final film, one giving Eastwood the artistic control he desired by making his directorial debut. The film was Play Misty for Me. Eastwood reflected on his new role:

After seventeen years of bouncing my head against the wall, hanging around sets, maybe influencing certain camera set-ups with my own opinions, watching actors go through all kinds of hell without any help, and working with both good directors and bad ones, I'm at the point where I'm ready to make my own pictures. I stored away all the mistakes I made and saved up all the good things I learned, and now I know enough to control my own projects and get what I want out of actors.

The story line was originally set in Los Angeles, but at Eastwood's insistence, the film was shot in the more comfortable surroundings of the actual Carmel-by-the-Sea, where he could shoot scenes at the local radio station, bars and restaurants and friends' houses. The idea of another love interest, with a level-headed girlfriend Tobie added to the plot, was a suggestion by Sonia Chernus, an editor who had been with Eastwood when he was initially spotted for Rawhide.

Filming commenced in Monterey, California, in September 1970, and although this was Eastwood's debut as film director, Don Siegel stood by to help and also had an acting role in the film as a bartender. Frequent collaborators of Siegel's, such as cinematographer Bruce Surtees, editor Carl Pingitore and composer Dee Barton made up part of the filming team.

Additional scenes were shot at the Monterey Jazz Festival in September 1970, featuring jazz greats Johnny Otis, Cannonball Adderley and future Weather Report founder Joe Zawinul. The commentator mentions: "That was the Cannonball Adderley group. They are playing at the Monterey Jazz Festival with Duke Ellington, Woody Herman, Joe Williams, and many others. Now we are gonna hear from 'The Gator Creek Organization' and 'Feeling Fine'..."

The Sardine Factory is still at the same location as in the film, at Prescott and Wave Streets, just one block up from Cannery Row in Monterey. The radio station, KRML, was an actual jazz station in Carmel, whose studios were relocated to the Eastwood Building at San Carlos and 5th, in the same building as the Hog's Breath Inn (a restaurant that Eastwood owned). After a brief dark period in 2010, the radio station returned to the air in 2011.

The rights to the song "Misty" were obtained after Eastwood saw pianist Erroll Garner perform at the Concord Music Festival in 1970. Eastwood also paid $2,000 for the use of the song "The First Time Ever I Saw Your Face" by Roberta Flack. Meticulous planning and efficient directorship by Eastwood (which would become one of his trademarks) enabled the film to be made nearly $50,000 short of its $1 million budget, and it was completed four or five days ahead of schedule. Variety reported the budget at $1,242,000. Other sources put the budget at $750,000.

== Release ==
Play Misty for Me premiered in October 1971 at the San Francisco Film Festival. It opened in six cities on October 20, 1971, before expanding in November.

=== Box office ===
It was a mild financial success, grossing $10.6 million at the US and Canadian box office. It grossed $133,000 in its first week from six theaters, finishing tenth for the week at the box office in the United States and Canada.

=== Critical response ===
The film has been given mostly positive reviews, with an 85% rating on Rotten with a mean of 7.3 of a possible 10 on Rotten Tomatoes, based on 40 reviews. The site's critics consensus reads: "A coolly calculating psychological thriller that manages to scare the audience even if it is just using textbook thrills." Metacritic, which uses a weighted average, assigned the film a score of 78 out of 100, based on 9 critics, indicating "generally favorable" reviews.

Roger Ebert wrote: "Play Misty for Me is not the artistic equal of Psycho, but in the business of collecting an audience into the palm of its hand and then squeezing hard, it is supreme."

Critics such as Jay Cocks in Time, Andrew Sarris in the Village Voice and Archer Winsten in the New York Post all praised Eastwood's directorial skills and the film, including his performance in the scenes with Walter.

Arthur D. Murphy of Variety called it an "often fascinating suspenser... when it's not serving as an overdone travelog for the Monterey Peninsula". He also praised the excellent casting.

Observers have noted that Walter's character in the film is consistent with someone diagnosed with borderline personality disorder, showing unstable mood, chaotic interpersonal relationships, highly impulsive behavior, self-harm and intense fear of abandonment. Slant Magazine named Walter's character one of the "15 famous movie psychopaths".

=== Accolades ===
Jessica Walter was nominated for the 1972 Golden Globe Award for Best Actress – Drama.

Play Misty for Me was number 26 on Bravo's 30 Even Scarier Movie Moments.

=== Home media ===
Play Misty for Me was released on DVD in many territories. In the United States it was released as a Collector's Edition DVD on September 18, 2001. Extra features include a 49-minute documentary titled "Play it Again: A Look Back at Play Misty for Me", a brief featurette of the relationship between Eastwood and Don Siegel, photography montage and "Evolution of a Poster" on the marketing and design of the one sheet. It was first released on Blu-ray Disc on November 10, 2015, by Universal Studios with most of the extra features ported over. The film was released in the United Kingdom on Blu-ray by Final Cut Ent. on July 27, 2020, with all-new alternative special features. It was released on Blu-ray in the U.S. by Kino Lorber studio classics on November 10, 2020, with a 2K master. It includes ported over special features from the previous release and an interview with Donna Mills and audio commentary by film historian Tim Lucas.

=== Adaptations ===
A novelization based on the script was written by Paul J. Gillette and published in 1972.
