= Kathleen Hughes =

American actress (1928–2025)

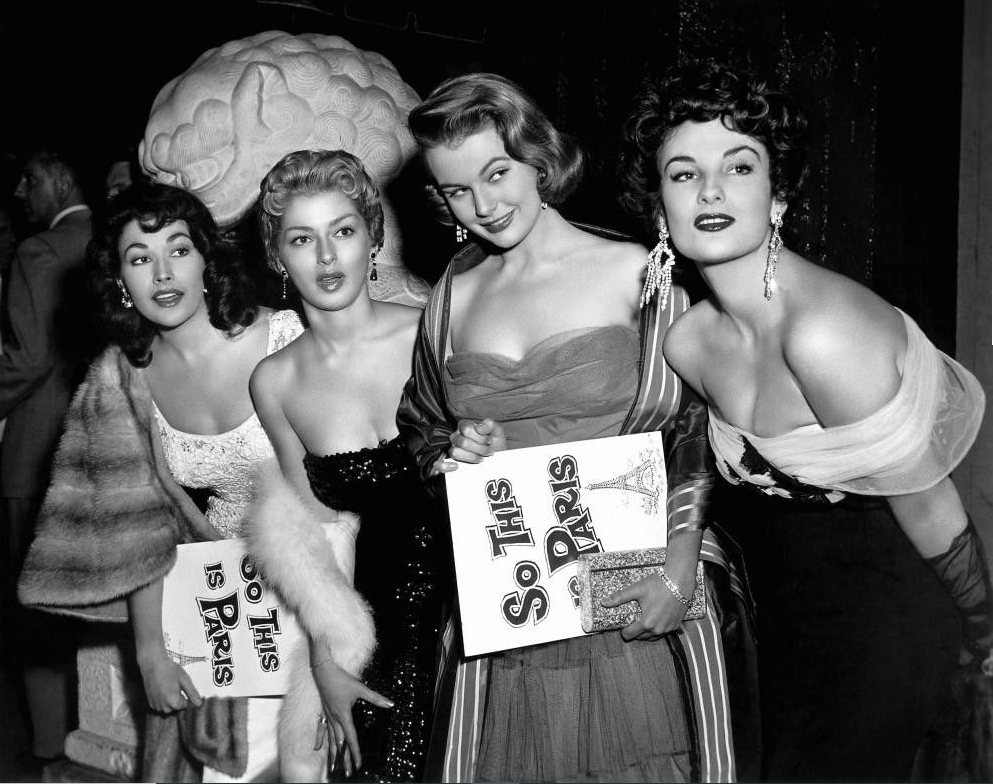
- Mara Corday, Hughes, Myrna Hansen and Allison Hayes in So This Is Paris (1955)
- Born: Elizabeth Margaret von Gerkan; November 14, 1928; Hollywood, California, U.S.
- Died: May 19, 2025 (aged 96)
- Education: Los Angeles City College; UCLA
- Occupation: Film, stage, television actress
- Years active: 1948–1998
- Known for: It Came From Outer Space
- Spouse: Stanley Rubin (m. 1954; died 2014)
- Children: 4
- Relatives: F. Hugh Herbert (uncle)

Kathleen Hughes (born Elizabeth Margaret von Gerkan; November 14, 1928 – May 19, 2025) was an American actress who appeared during the Golden Age of Hollywood.

== Early life ==
Hughes was born in Hollywood, California, on November 14, 1928. Her maternal uncle, F. Hugh Herbert, was a playwright who authored Kiss and Tell and The Moon Is Blue. Her desire to act was inspired by a film she saw featuring Donald O'Connor, which gave her the idea that "acting looked like fun." After graduating from Fairfax High School, Hughes attended Los Angeles City College and UCLA.

== Film ==
Hughes was discovered in a Little Theater production in 1948. Signed to a seven-year contract with 20th Century Fox, she made 14 films for the studio. She appeared in five motion pictures for Universal Studios, including the cult film It Came From Outer Space. Hughes co-starred with Edward G. Robinson in a 1953 crime drama, The Glass Web, and appeared in an adventure film that year, The Golden Blade.

== Television ==
By 1956, Hughes was appearing in television series. She played in episodes of Alfred Hitchcock Presents (1956–1957), Telephone Time (1956), The Bob Cummings Show (1958), The Adventures of Ozzie and Harriet, 77 Sunset Strip (1959), Hotel de Paree (1959), Tightrope! (1959), General Electric Theater (1960–1962), The Tall Man (1961), Bachelor Father (1962), Gomer Pyle, U.S.M.C. (1965), and I Dream of Jeannie (1967).

In 1962, Hughes played the role of murder victim Lita Krail in the sixth-season 1962 episode of Perry Mason, entitled "The Case of the Double-Entry Mind". She played the recurring role of Mrs. Coburn on the television series The Ghost & Mrs. Muir. She appeared on M*A*S*H as Lorraine Blake, wife of unit commander Henry Blake, in a home movie she sent to him. Hughes portrayed Mitch, a secretary, on the NBC drama Bracken's World (1969–1971).

== Stage ==
Hughes' favorite stage role was in the play The Seven Year Itch.

== Personal life and death ==
On July 25, 1954, Hughes married Stanley Rubin, the producer of Bracken's World, at the home of her uncle. The couple had one daughter and three sons. The marriage lasted 59 years, until Rubin died on March 2, 2014, at the age of 96.

Hughes died on May 19, 2025, at the age of 96.

== Filmography ==
Year	Title	Role	Notes
1949	Mother Is a Freshman	Rhoda Adams	
1949	Mr. Belvedere Goes to College	Kay Nelson	
1949	It Happens Every Spring	Sarah	
1950	Where the Sidewalk Ends	Secretary	
1950	Mister 880	Secretary	
1950	I'll Get By	Secretary	
1951	Take Care of My Little Girl	Jenny Barker	
1951	I'll See You in My Dreams	Nurse	
1952	For Men Only	Tracy Norman	
1952	Sally and Saint Anne	Lois Foran	
1953	It Came from Outer Space	Jane	
1953	The Golden Blade	Bakhamra	
1953	Thy Neighbor's Wife	Anushka	
1953	The Glass Web	Paula Ranier	
1954	Dawn at Socorro	Clare	
1955	Cult of the Cobra	Julia Thompson	
1956	Three Bad Sisters	Valerie Craig	
1956	Alfred Hitchcock Presents	Marian Koster	Season 2 Episode 11: "The Better Bargain"
1957	Alfred Hitchcock Presents	Ann Nash	Season 2 Episode 29: "Vicious Circle"
1958	Unwed Mother	Linda	
1966	Promise Her Anything	Bit part	
1967	The President's Analyst	White House Tourist	
1971	The Late Liz	Elaine Rich	
1972	Pete 'n' Tillie	Party Guest	
1974	The Take	School Nurse	
1990	Revenge	Mother Superior	
1998	Welcome to Hollywood	Woman in curlers	

== Sources ==
- "Kathleen Hughes Says She Is Still Growing Up". The Morning News. Florence, South Carolina. April 11, 1970. p. 11.
- "Kathleen Hughes First Feminine Sensation Created By 3D". The Newport Daily News. Newport, Rhode Island. July 9, 1953. p. 9.
