= Christiane Martel =

French-Mexican actress and beauty queen (born 1936)

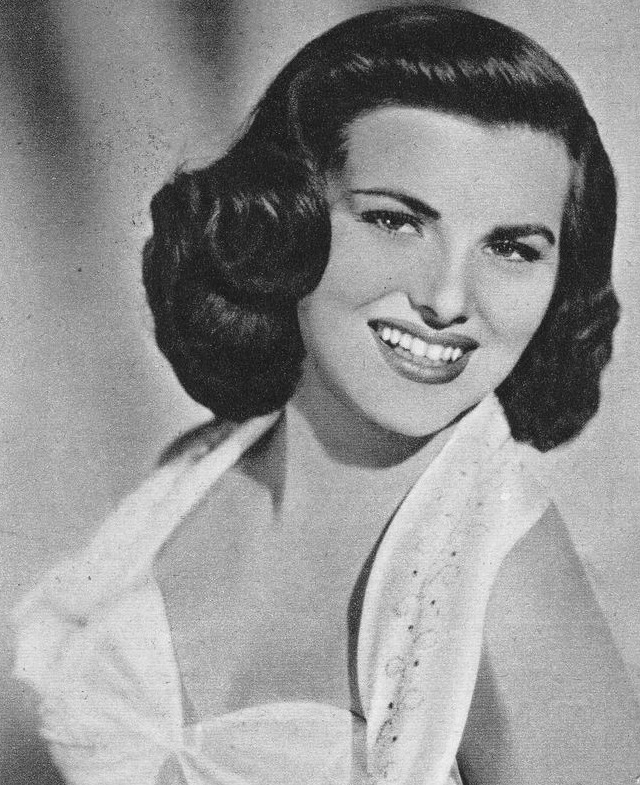
- Christiane Martel in 1954

Miss Universe 1953

First Lady of Veracruz
- In role 1 December 1998 – 30 November 2004
- Governor: Miguel Alemán Velasco
- Preceded by: Sonia Sánchez de Chirinos
- Succeeded by: Rosa Margarita Borunda de Herrera

Personal details
- Born: Christiane Magnani; 18 January 1936 (age 90) Nancy, France
- Height: 5 ft 6 in (168 cm)
- Spouse(s): Ronnie Marengo (divorced); Miguel Aleman Velasco
- Children: 4, including Miguel
- Occupation: Actress (1954–1961); Beauty queen (1952–1953)

Christiane Martel (born Christiane Magnani on 18 January 1936) is a French-Mexican actress, model and beauty queen. She became the second woman to win the Miss Universe beauty pageant in 1953. She was the only French woman to hold the Miss Universe title until Iris Mittenaere in 2016.

== Life and career ==
=== Childhood ===
Martel was born on 18 January 1936 in Nancy, France to a modest family of Italian ancestry and was raised in Piennes. Amid the Second World War, her family moved to Western France, and later, in 1940, to Loudun.

=== 1952–1953: Pageantry ===
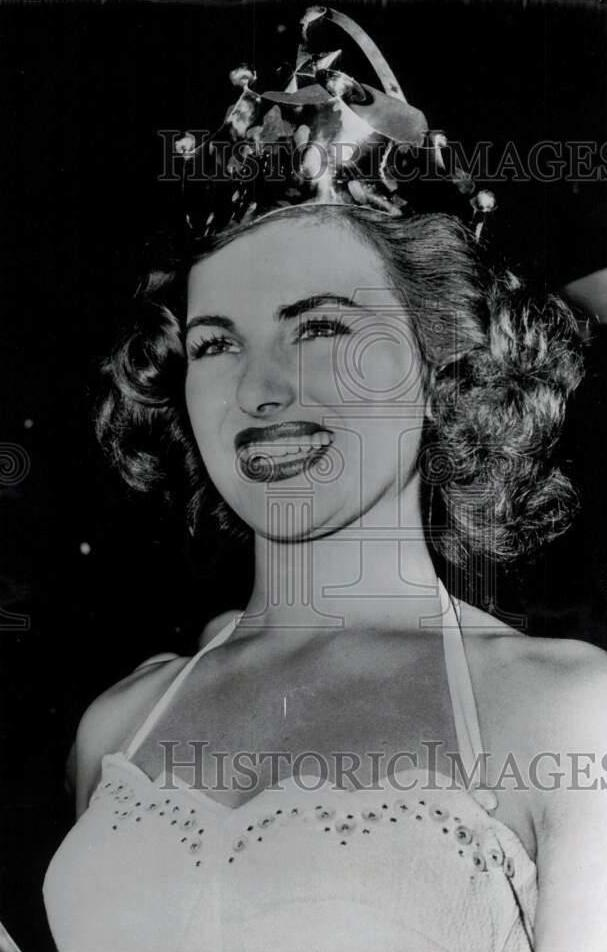
Martel in 1953

She was Miss Châtellerault in 1952. She was crowned Miss Cinémonde and represented France at Miss Universe 1953 where she became the second Miss Universe. She was crowned by actress Julie Adams as Miss Universe 1952, Armi Kuusela of Finland, had given up her crown.

Martel's runners-up in the 1953 pageant was Myrna Hansen of the USA, followed by delegates of Japan, Mexico, and Australia.

=== 1954–1962: Acting career ===
Shortly after her reign, Martel embarked on a successful career in international films, appearing in movies such as Yankee Pasha, So This Is Paris, Drop the Curtain, the 1956 version of Corazón salvaje (playing the villain Aimée), Viva el Amor!, Rosa Blanca and her last film to date, 1961's Leoni al Sole.

=== Later activities ===
Later, Martel served as a judge at the Miss Universe 1978 pageant. She would also make television appearances at the Miss Universe pageants held in 1989, 1993, and 2007, all of which were held in Mexico. Her most recent television appearance in France was on 3 December 2011 at the Miss France pageant. She appeared in the Mexican television show, Sale el sol in 2017 where she was interviewed.

== Personal life ==
Martel was married briefly to Ronnie Marengo, a department store heir, whom she divorced in 1955. In 1961 she married Miguel Alemán Velasco, who would become Governor of Veracruz and is the son of Miguel Alemán Valdés, former president of Mexico. They have three daughters and one son. Their son, Miguel Alemán Magnani, is a stakeholder of Televisa and is the former owner of low-cost airline, Interjet.

Awards and achievements
| Preceded by (Finland) Armi Kuusela (Relinquished) | Miss Universe; 1953 | Succeeded by (United States) Miriam Stevenson |
