= Go ahead, make my day =

Film catchphrase in 1983's Sudden Impact

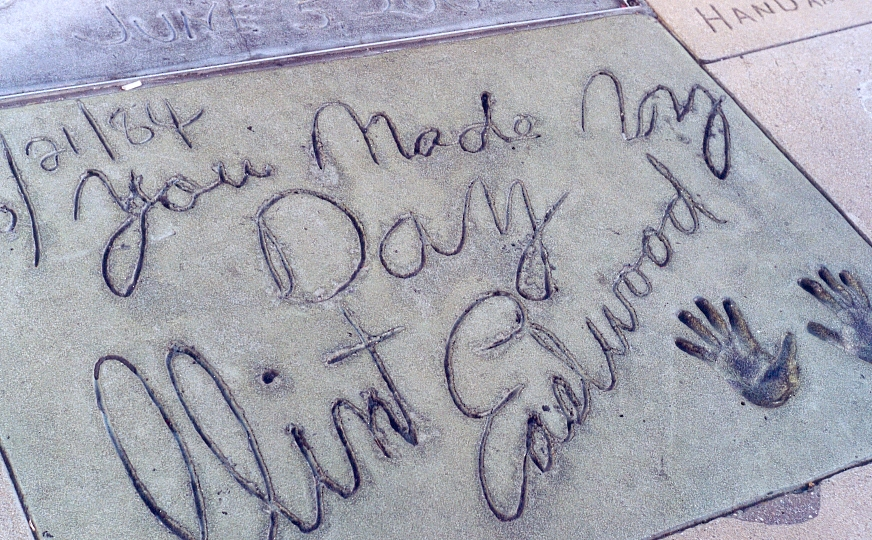
- A concrete relief of a pair of Clint Eastwood's handprints and a writing of "You made my day" at the Hollywood Boulevard
- Character: "Dirty" Harry Callahan
- Actor: Clint Eastwood
- Written by: Joseph Stinson
- First used in: Sudden Impact
- Voted #6 in AFI's 100 Movie Quotes poll

"Go ahead, make my day" is a catchphrase from the neo-noir action-thriller film Sudden Impact (1983), spoken by the character Harry Callahan, played by Clint Eastwood. The iconic line was written by John Milius, whose writing contributions to the film were uncredited, but has also been attributed to Charles B. Pierce, who wrote the film's story, and to Joseph Stinson, who wrote the screenplay. In 2005, it was chosen as No. 6 on the American Film Institute list AFI's 100 Years...100 Movie Quotes.

== Origins ==
=== Background ===
The phrase "make my day" had been uttered a year earlier in a lesser-known movie from 1982 titled Vice Squad. In that scene, a detective, Tom Walsh (Gary Swanson), while arresting a pimp named 'Ramrod' (Wings Hauser), puts his gun up to the side of Ramrod's mouth and says "Come on scumbag, make your move... and make my day!"

=== Summary of the scene in Sudden Impact ===
At the beginning of the movie, Harry Callahan (Clint Eastwood) goes into a diner for a morning cup of coffee where he discovers a robbery in progress. He kills all but one of the robbers in a shootout. However, the surviving robber grabs the fleeing waitress Loretta (Mara Corday), holds his gun to her head, and threatens to shoot. Instead of backing off, Harry points his .44 Magnum revolver into the man's face and dares him to shoot, saying with clenched teeth and in his characteristic rough grumble, "Go ahead, make my day," meaning that if the robber attempts to harm Loretta in any way, Harry would be happy to dispatch the robber. At the end of the film, Harry, again, says "Come on, make my day" just before shooting Mick the rapist, who aims his stolen shotgun at Harry's lover, Jennifer Spencer (Sondra Locke).

== Influence ==
Country singer T. G. Sheppard recorded a novelty song with Eastwood titled "Make My Day" which featured Eastwood reciting the line.

When speaking out against taxes at the 1985 American Business Conference, President Ronald Reagan, himself a former actor, stated "I have my veto pen drawn and ready for any tax increase that Congress might even think of sending up. And I have only one thing to say to the tax increasers: 'Go ahead—make my day.'"

In "White Heat", from the 1986 album True Blue, Madonna draws inspiration and samples lines from noir movie White Heat and uses the line in the chorus of the song.

The song "Action" by Finnish band LOVEX features the line in its lyrics.

The 1991 Japanese film Godzilla vs. King Ghidorah has a character say the line in English, referencing its ubiquity.

During his speech at the 2012 Republican National Convention, Eastwood ended by referencing the line.

In February 2015, The Economist featured the headline "Go ahead, Angela, make my day" in reference to the European debt crisis.

"Stand-your-ground" statutes referring to a person's right to self-defense are sometimes referred to as "make my day" statutes.

Swap Force Skylander Rattle Shake's catchphrase; "Go ahead - snake my day!" is a play on this quote.

=== Italy ===
An Italian version of the phrase, Coraggio... fatti ammazzare (more literally "go ahead, get yourself killed"), was also chosen as the title for the dubbed version of the film and has become a catchphrase in Italy as well.
