= Miguel Alemán Magnani =

Mexican businessman

Miguel Alemán Magnani is a Mexican tycoon who was the president and CEO of Mexican airline Interjet, which was facing liquidation on a federal court order as of April 2023. Magnani is the son of ex-politician and Grupo Alemán president and CEO Miguel Alemán Velasco, and actress and former Miss Universe 1953 Christiane Martel. He is the grandson of the Mexican president from 1946 to 1952, Miguel Alemán Valdés.

In April 2020, Interjet and the Tax Administration Service (SAT) reached an agreement on payment of its MXN $549.3 million debt. Interjet declared "technical bankruptcy" in August 2019 due to poor investments, including those in the Mexico City Texcoco Airport (NAIM). Interjet suspended its flights on March 24, 2020, in response to the COVID-19 pandemic in Mexico. Interjet's agreement to pay its taxes came after the SAT seized the property of the Miguel Alemán Valdés Foundation in Polanco, Mexico City.

In December 2020, Magnani was replaced as president of Interjet.
