= Man Without a Star =

1955 film by King Vidor

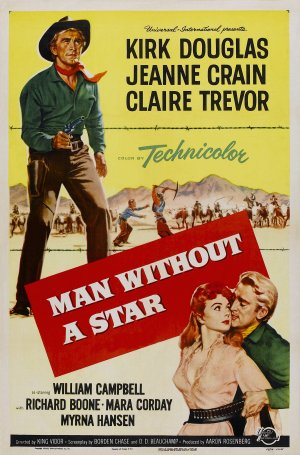
- Film poster by Reynold Brown
- Directed by: King Vidor
- Written by: Dee Linford (novel)
- Screenplay by: Borden Chase; D.D. Beauchamp (as D. D. Beauchamp)
- Produced by: Aaron Rosenberg
- Starring: Kirk Douglas; Jeanne Crain; Claire Trevor; William Campbell; Richard Boone; Mara Corday; Myrna Hansen
- Cinematography: Russell Metty
- Edited by: Virgil W. Vogel
- Music by: Hans Salter (uncredited); Herman Stein (uncredited)
- Color process: Technicolor
- Production company: Universal-International Pictures
- Distributed by: Universal-International Pictures
- Release dates: March 24, 1955 (New York City); April 27, 1955 (Los Angeles)
- Running time: 89 minutes
- Country: United States
- Language: English
- Box office: $2.2 million (US)

Man Without a Star is a 1955 American Western film starring Kirk Douglas, Jeanne Crain, Claire Trevor, William Campbell, Richard Boone, Mara Corday, and Myrna Hansen. Directed by King Vidor, it is based on the novel of the same name, published in 1952 by Dee Linford (1915–1971). A remake was made for television in 1968 entitled A Man Called Gannon. In February 2020, the film was shown at the 70th Berlin International Film Festival as part of a retrospective dedicated to King Vidor's career.

== Plot ==
On a train from Kansas City to Wyoming, the brakeman throws Jeff Jimson off for freighthopping, and he is saved from being run over by Dempsey Rae. Later that night, Dempsey and Jeff watch as another train hopper kills the brakeman. When the authorities try to arrest Jeff for the crime, Dempsey proves the other man was guilty. He is given half of the $100 reward for finding the murderer.

Dempsey has a female acquaintance, Idonee, in town, and both men decide to stay after being hired to work (as alleged fellow Texans) by Strap Davis on a 10,000-head ranch for its new owner, Reed Bowman. Dempsey tells Jeff that many men follow a star to set their destination. When asked by Jeff what star he follows, Dempsey tells him that he follows no particular star. Dempsey teaches Jeff how to shoot, rope, ride, and herd cattle.

When Bowman finally arrives, Dempsey is surprised to find that he has been working for a very attractive woman, Reed Bowman. Bowman has plans to triple the size of her herd, which will crowd out the other ranchers on the available range. Dempsey falls for her, but the inevitable range war Bowman creates prompts him to defect to the other side. He has a deep hatred for barbed wire, but he finds that there is no clear moral side to the fight.

After being estranged from his protégé, Dempsey finally comes to peace with Jeff before riding off to a new life.

== Cast ==
- Kirk Douglas as Dempsey Rae
- Jeanne Crain as Reed Bowman
- Claire Trevor as Idonee
- William Campbell as Jeff "Texas" Jimson
- Richard Boone as Steve Miles
- Jay C. Flippen as Strap Davis
- Myrna Hansen as Tess Cassidy
- Mara Corday as Moccasin Mary
- Eddy C. Waller as Tom Cassidy
- Sheb Wooley as Latigo
- George Wallace as Tom Carter
- Frank Chase as Little Waco
- Paul Birch as Mark Toliver
- Roy Barcroft as Sheriff Olson
- William Challee as Brick Gooder
- Malcolm Atterbury as Fancy Joe Toole
- Jack Elam appears (uncredited) as a ruffian who kills the train guard early in the movie.
- Jack Ingram as Jessup (uncredited)

== Production ==
=== Filming ===
In the scenes where Kirk Douglas's character is standing next to the cattle train, the car's identification marks state it was built in December 1923 (BLT 12–23), which was well after the film's late 1800s time period (there were no railroads out West in 1823).

== Reception ==
Douglas later estimated he made over a million dollars from the film.

== See also ==
- List of American films of 1955
