= Miss USA 1953 =

2nd edition of Miss USA pageant

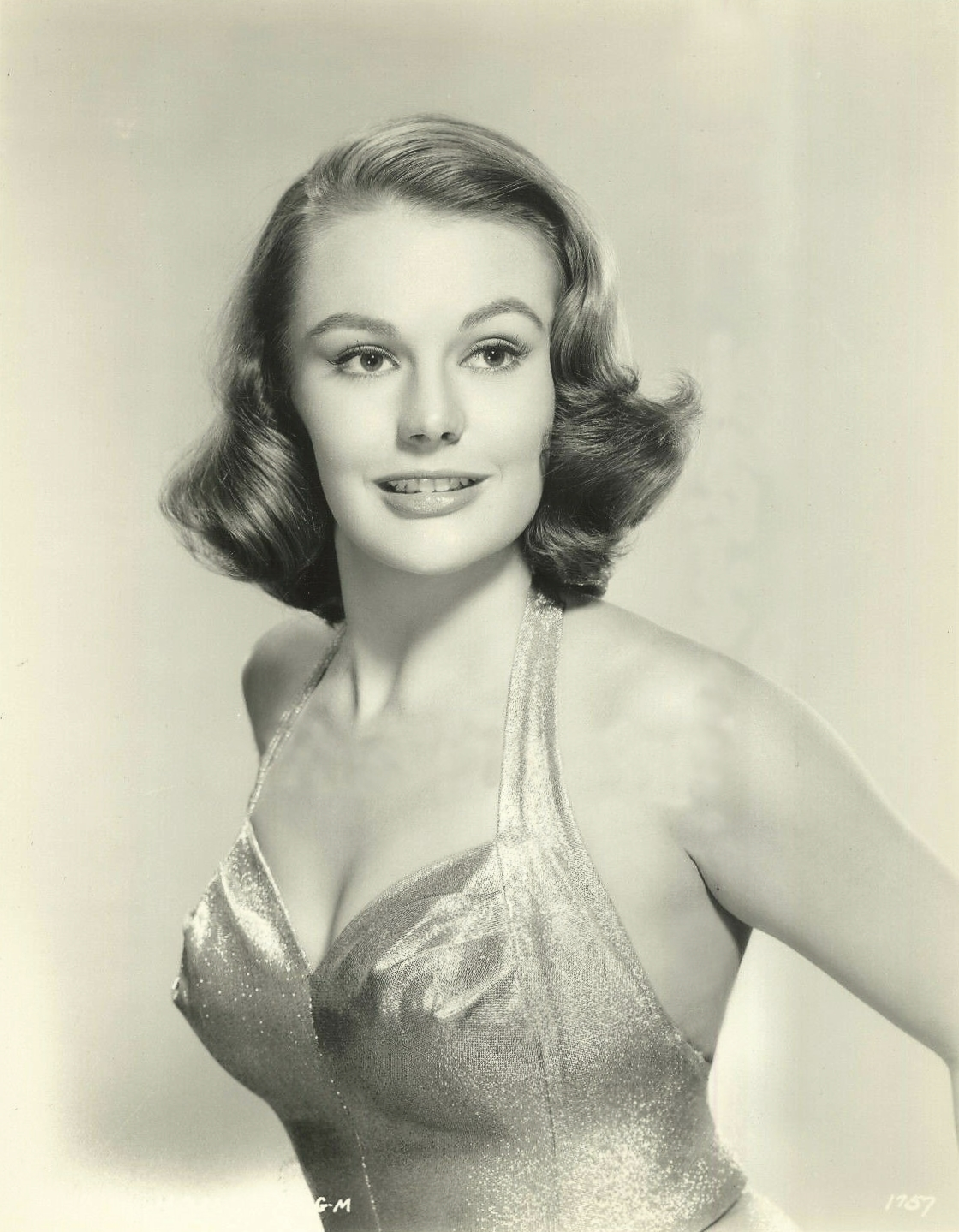
- Myrna Hansen
- Date: July 16, 1953
- Presenters: Bob Russell
- Venue: Long Beach Municipal Auditorium, Long Beach, California
- Entrants: 43
- Placements: 20
- Debuts: Iowa; Maryland; Miami; Myrtle Beach; Nebraska; New Hampshire; West Virginia; Wyoming
- Withdrawals: Delaware; Florida; Georgia; Kansas; New Mexico; Oregon; Tennessee
- Winner: Myrna Hansen; Illinois
- Congeniality: Jeanne Vaughn Thompson; Louisiana

Miss USA 1953 was the second Miss USA pageant, held at the Long Beach Municipal Auditorium in Long Beach, California on July 16, 1953.

At the end of the event, Jackie Loughery of New York crowned Myrna Hansen of Illinois as Miss USA 1953. It is the first victory of Illinois in the pageant's history.

Contestants from forty-three states and cities competed in this year's pageant. The competition was hosted by Bob Russell.

== Background ==
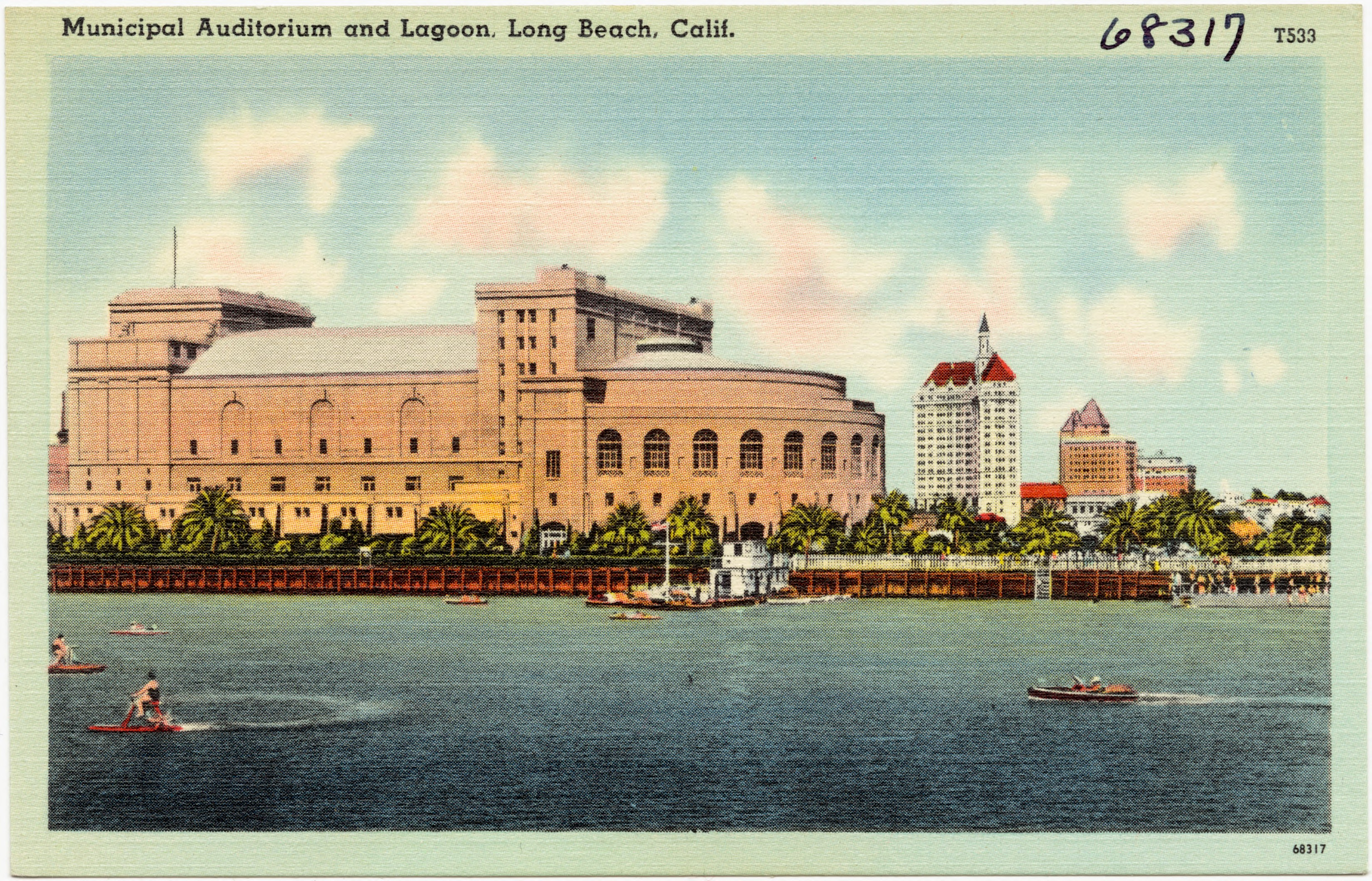
Long Beach Municipal Auditorium, the venue of Miss USA 1953

=== Selection of participants ===
Contestants from forty-three states and cities have been selected to compete in the competition. The age requirement in this edition is still from 18 to 28, where women who are married and have children can also participate.

Jeanne Vaughn Thompson of Louisiana, who competed last year and placed as first runner-up, competed once again in this edition, making her the first contestant from Miss USA who competed twice.

This edition saw the debuts of Iowa, Maryland, Miami, Myrtle Beach, Nebraska, New Hampshire, West Virginia, and Wyoming. The states of Delaware, Florida, Georgia, Kansas, New Mexico, Oregon, and Tennessee withdrew in this edition.

== Results ==
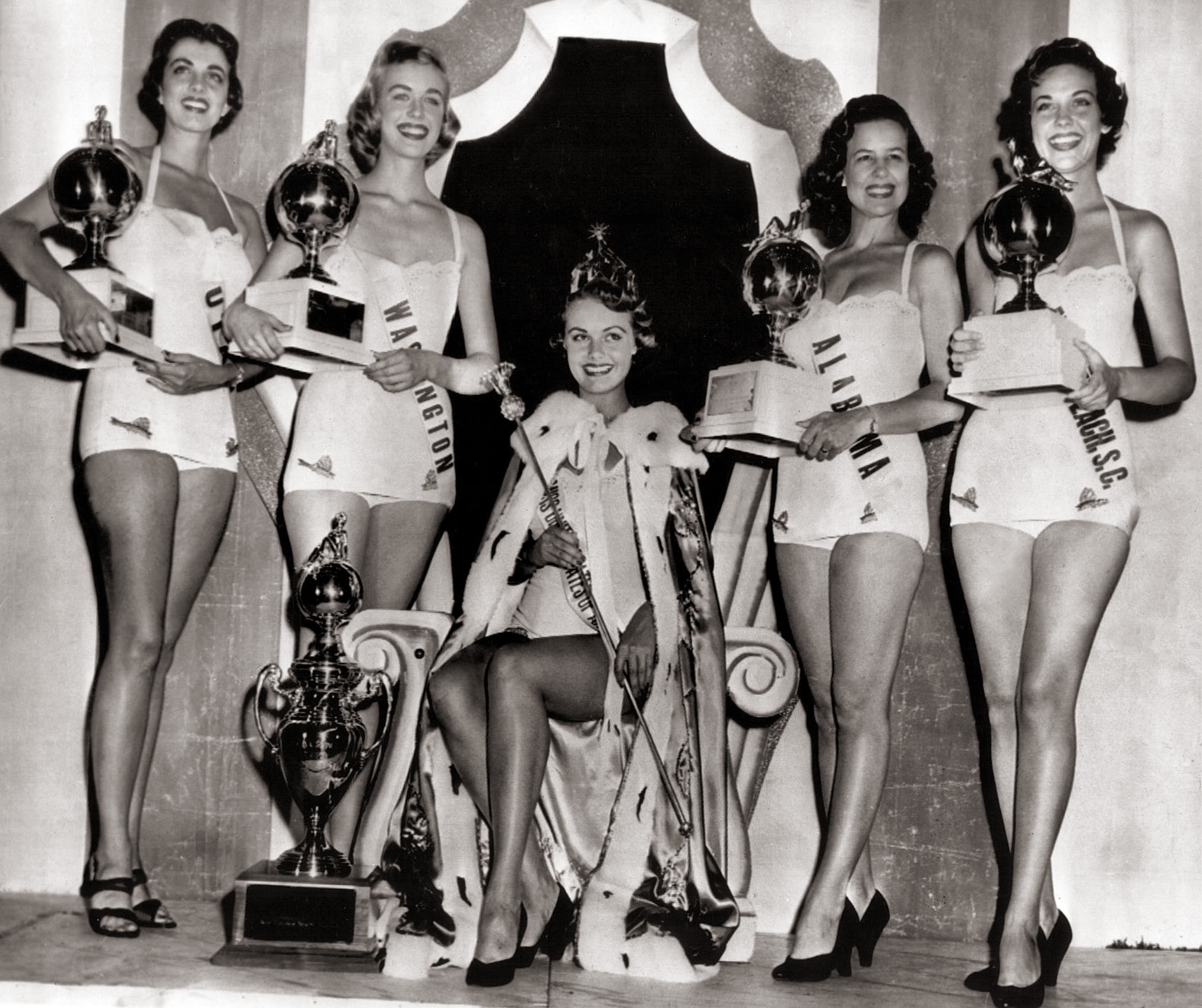
From left to right, Shauna Wood (Utah), Nancy Petraborg (Washington), Myrna Hansen (Illinois, Miss USA), Doris Edwards (Alabama), Mary Kemp Griffin (Myrtle Beach)

=== Placements ===
Placement	Contestant
Miss USA 1953	Illinois – Myrna Hansen
1st runner-up	Myrtle Beach, South Carolina – Mary Kemp Griffin
2nd runner-up	Alabama – Doris Edwards
3rd runner-up	Washington – Nancy Petraborg
4th runner-up	Utah – Shauna Wood
Top 20	California – Marcella Roulette; Colorado – Jeanie Carroll; Iowa – Marilyn Shonka; Kentucky – Mary Ann Stice; Louisiana – Jeanne Thompson; Maine – Jackie Lee; Miami Beach, Florida – Kay Duggar; Minnesota – Mary Ann Papke; Nebraska – Berneta Nelson; Nevada – Earlene Whitt; New York – Reta Knapp; Ohio – Eleanor Mack; Pennsylvania – Jeri Bauer; South Carolina – Susan Day; Texas – Joan Bradshaw

=== Special awards ===
Award	Contestant
Miss Congeniality	Louisiana – Jeanne Vaughn Thompson
Miss Body Beautiful	Kentucky – Mary Stice

== Pageant ==
=== Format ===
From ten semi-finalists in 1952, twenty semi-finalists were chosen at the preliminary competition that consists of the swimsuit and evening gown competition. Each of the twenty semi-finalists gave a short speech during the final telecast. Afterwards, the twenty semi-finalists paraded again in their swimsuits and evening gowns, and the five finalists were eventually chosen.

=== Selection committee ===
- Jeff Chandler – American actor
- Rhonda Fleming – American actress and singer
- Arlene Dahl – American actress
- Constance Moore – American actress and singer
- Buddy Westmore – American moviemaker
- Varga – Artist

== Contestants ==
Forty-three contestants competed for the title.

State/City	Contestant	Age (Note: Ages at the time of the pageant)	Hometown	Notes
Alabama	Doris Edwards	25	Birmingham	
Arizona	Eleanor Ruth Cross	19	Chandler	
Arkansas	Jackie Stucker	19	West Helena	
California	Marcella Roulette	21	Los Angeles	
Colorado	Jeanie Carroll	18	Denver	
Connecticut	Beverlee Burlant	21	Bridgeport	Previously Miss Connecticut 1951
Idaho	Patricia Carter	18	Boise	
Illinois	Myrna Rae Hansen	17	Chicago	1st runner-up at Miss Universe 1953
Indiana	Edith Mae Krumme	19	Seymour	
Iowa	Marilyn Shonka	18	Sioux City	
Kentucky	Mary Stice	19	Paducah	
Louisiana	Jeanne Vaughn Thompson	21	Baton Rouge	Previously Miss Louisiana USA 1952; Placed 1st runner-up at Miss USA 1952; Previously Miss Louisiana 1951
Maine	Jackie Lee	22	Cape Neddick	
Maryland	Diane Gale Durham	22	Silver Spring	
Massachusetts	Joan Daly	20	Somerville	
Miami Beach, Florida	Kay Duggar	21	Miami	
Michigan	Jo Ann Page	20	Detroit	
Minnesota	Mary Ann Papke	20	Minneapolis	
Mississippi	Jessie Wynn Morgan	20	Newton	Previously Miss Mississippi 1951; Top 15 at Miss America 1952
Missouri	Donna Gardner	18	Portageville	
Montana	Billie Jean Tyrell	21	Billings	
Myrtle Beach, South Carolina	Mary Kemp Griffin	23	Florence	Later represented the USA at Miss World 1953 and placed 5th runner-up
Nebraska	Berneta Nelson	20	Clay Center	
Nevada	Earlene Whitt	18	Las Vegas	
New Hampshire	Muriel Roy	24	Nashua	
New Jersey	Susan Ruth Harris	18	Haddonfield	
New York	Reta Knapp	23	New York City	
North Carolina	Libby Walker	–	Wilton	
North Dakota	Marilyn Caufield	19	Jamestown	
Ohio	Eleanore Mack	20	Bellaire	
Oklahoma	Barbara Bond	21	Oklahoma City	
Pennsylvania	Jeri Hauer	27	Hatboro	
Rhode Island	Barbara Rose Deigman	20	Providence	
South Carolina	Susan Anthony Day	18	Greenville	
South Dakota	Kathleen Herman	18	Bowdle	
Texas	Joan Bradshaw	17	Houston	
Utah	Shauna Wood	22	Salt Lake City	
Vermont	Kathleen Marie Eugenia Surrel	22	Brooklyn, New York City	
Virginia	Dorothy Lee Bailey	21	Norfolk	
Washington	Nancy Petraborg	18	Seattle	
West Virginia	Fay Higley	18	South Charleston	
Wisconsin	Jacque Kimmel	24	Milwaukee	
Wyoming	Nancy Rogers	–	Cheyenne	
