= A Day of Fury =

1956 film

- Directed by: Harmon Jones
- Screenplay by: James Edmiston; Oscar Brodney
- Story by: James Edmiston
- Produced by: Robert Arthur
- Starring: Dale Robertson; Mara Corday; Jock Mahoney
- Cinematography: Ellis W. Carter
- Edited by: Sherman Todd
- Color process: Technicolor
- Production company: Universal International Pictures
- Distributed by: Universal Pictures
- Release date: May 2, 1956 (Los Angeles)
- Running time: 79 minutes
- Country: United States
- Language: English

A Day of Fury is a 1956 American Western film directed by Harmon Jones and starring Dale Robertson, Mara Corday and Jock Mahoney. The working title of the film was Jagade, the name of Robertson's character.

== Plot ==
A gunslinger named Jagade happens upon a stranger in trouble on the trail and saves his life. Jagade immediately regrets it upon learning the man is Alan Burnett, who is not only a U.S. Marshal but on his way to the town of West End to marry Jagade's former sweetheart that very day.

Jagade gets to town first and disrupts the proceedings. He taunts the betrothed woman, Sharman Fulton, in public. She was once a dancehall girl of low repute, but has since been taken into the home of the honorable Judge John J. McLean and has redeemed her reputation. Preacher Jason, nevertheless, calls off the wedding after Jagade sullies her name.

Burnett arrives but has no call to arrest Jagade and remains indebted for the gunfighter's aid on the trail. Jagade provokes him and the town, forcing open the saloon on a Sunday and re-importing the saloon girls against the town's regulation. This infuriates the townspeople, including the meek Miss Timmons and the Preacher, who now intends to burn the saloon down. Because of Marshal Burnett's failure to immediately run Jagade out of town and Sharman's going to the saloon to ask Jagade to leave town, the judge kicks Sharman out of his house. Marshal Burnett shoots the judge in the arm to try to keep him from getting killed by trying to arrest Jagade. This causes the judge to swear out a warrant and jail Burnett. With nowhere else to go, Sharman moves into the saloon and agrees to Jagade's condition that she don her red dancehall costume of old.

Billy Brand, a young resident of the town who admires Jagade, shoots the preacher. But he is overcome with remorse when Miss Timmons, who has been humiliated by Jagade, hangs herself. Realizing that only the marshal can take on Jagade, the judge orders him released from jail. A church bell distracts Jagade during a shootout and Burnett's bullet fatally wounds him. As he dies, Jagade realizes the bell was rung in honor of the preacher who opposed him and was killed by Billy.

== Comments ==
Dale Robertson remarked, "It was an interesting story. After I finished it, I read it again. I figured this guy (Jagade) was the Devil. He, himself, never did anything wrong. He merely set things up to show the weakness of other people. (Producer) Bob Arthur rewrote the story... and he took away a lot of the little subtle things that were so wonderful in the original script".

== Cast ==
- Dale Robertson as Jagade
- Mara Corday as Sharman
- Jock Mahoney as Burnett
- Carl Benton Reid as Judge McLean
- Jan Merlin as Billy
- John Dehner as Preacher Jason
- Dee Carroll as Miss Timmons
- Sheila Bromley as Marie
- James Bell as Doc Logan
- Dani Crayne as Claire
- Howard Wendell as Vanryzin
- Charles Cane as Duggen
- Phil Chambers as Burson
- Sydney Mason as Beemans
- Helen Kleeb as Mrs. McLean

== See also ==
- List of American films of 1956
