= Miguel Alemán Velasco =

Mexican politician, businessman and philanthropist (born 1932)

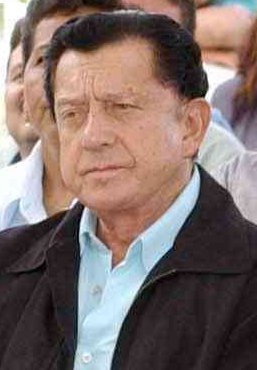

57th Governor of Veracruz
- In office 1 December 1998 – 30 November 2004
- Preceded by: Patricio Chirinos Calero
- Succeeded by: Fidel Herrera

President of the Organización de Televisión Iberoamericana
- In office 1997–2000
- Preceded by: Guillermo Cañedo
- Succeeded by: Emilio Azcárraga

Personal details
- Born: 18 March 1932 (age 94) Veracruz, Veracruz
- Party: Institutional Revolutionary Party
- Spouse: Christiane Magnani
- Children: 4, including Miguel
- Profession: Lawyer, businessman, politician, philanthropist

Miguel Alemán Velasco (born 18 March 1932) is a Mexican politician, businessman and philanthropist. He is a former senator and governor of Veracruz. Alemán Velasco is the son of former president Miguel Alemán Valdés (1946–52), the first candidate to run for the presidency from the Institutional Revolutionary Party and the first civilian president in the modern era, and Beatriz Velasco Mendoza. Alemán Velasco has been active in both the public and private sectors.

== Early years ==
Alemán Velasco was born in the port of Veracruz in 1932. He holds a law degree from the National Autonomous University of Mexico (UNAM).

== Career ==
His father's holdings in the large Mexican television network Televisa led to Alemán Velasco's importance in that media company.

In November 2013 Alemán received the "Jerusalem Prize", which since 2002 has been awarded by the World Zionist Organization in conjunction with the Zionist Council of Mexico. President Miguel Alemán Valdés sent weapons to Israel via Panama when he was Interior Secretary (1940–1945) and the younger Alemán has had a long relationship with Israel and many Jewish friends.

In April 2020, the Tax Administration Service (SAT) seized the property of the Miguel Alemán Valdés Foundation in Polanco, Mexico City. Alemán Velasco is the CEO of Grupo Alemán (Galem), which includes Interjet, an airline which declared "technical bankruptcy" in August 2019 due to poor investments, including those in the Mexico City Texcoco Airport (NAIM). Interjet suspended its flights on 24 March 2020, in response to the COVID-19 pandemic in Mexico. Interjet and SAT reached an agreement on payment of the MXN $549.3 million debt on 23 April 2020.

== Family life ==
He is married to former Miss Universe and actress Christiane Magnani and has four children: Claudia, Mónica, Karla and Miguel Alemán Magnani. When Alemán Velasco sold his stakes at Televisa, his son acquired them and was the owner of Interjet, the now defunct, low-fares airline.

Political offices
Preceded by Patricio Chirinos Calero	Governor of Veracruz; 1998–2004	Succeeded by Fidel Herrera Beltrán
