= Myrna Hansen =

American actress, model, and beauty pageant winner (born 1934)

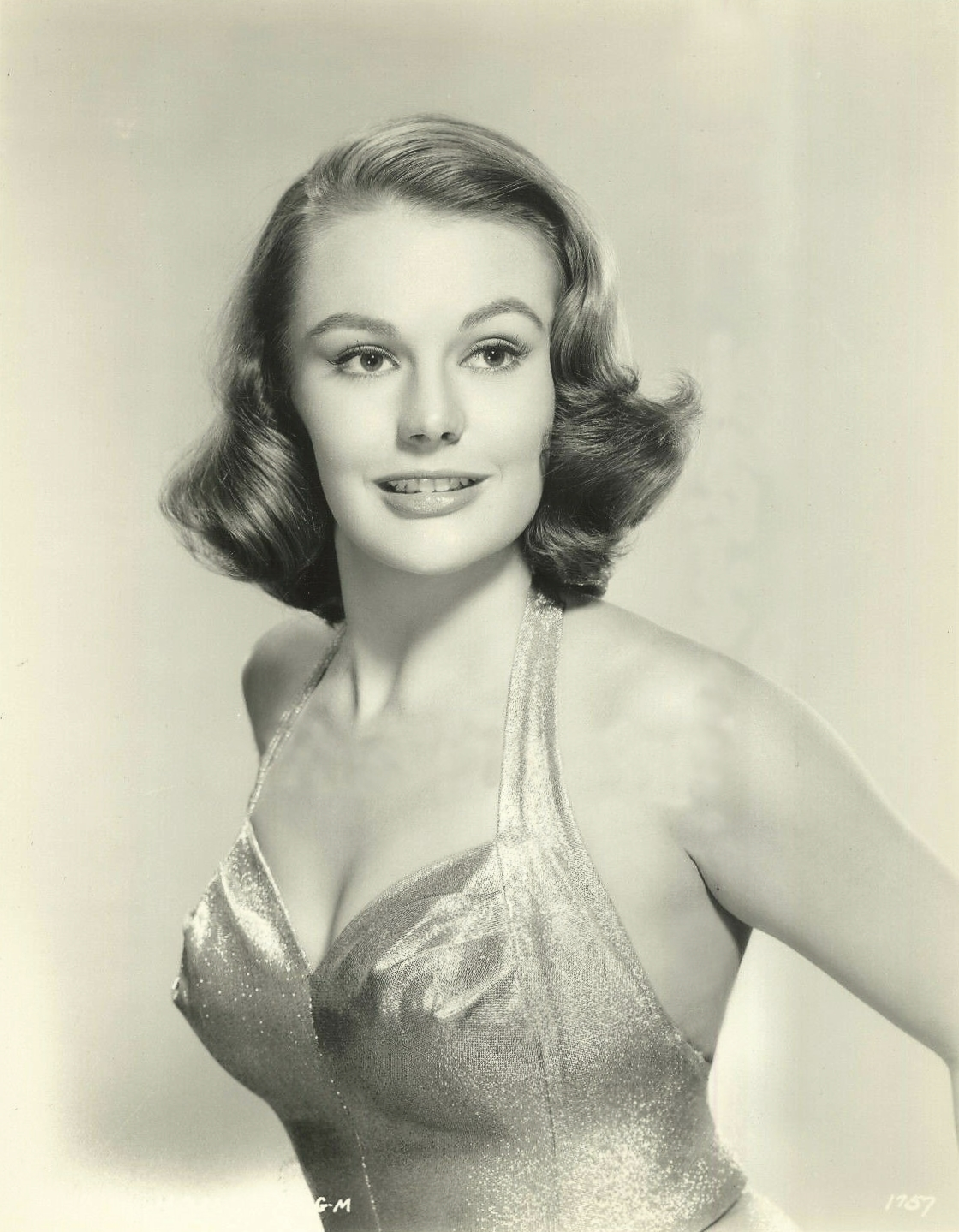
- Hansen in a 1957 Metro-Goldwyn-Mayer publicity photograph
- Born: August 5, 1934 (age 92); Chicago, Illinois, U.S.
- Education: Carl Schurz High School
- Occupations: Actress; model
- Years active: 1953–1973
- Known for: Man Without a Star; Party Girl; Cult of the Cobra; Raintree County; There's Always Tomorrow
- Title: Miss USA 1953
- Spouse(s): ? (?–1960); Lee Duke Hyatt (1961–1965); Allen H. Kane (1985–1998)
- Children: 2

Myrna Hansen (born August 5, 1934) is an American actress, model, and beauty pageant titleholder who won Miss USA 1953.

== Education ==
Hansen is the daughter of Mr. and Mrs. Raymond E. Hansen. She graduated from Carl Schurz High School in Chicago, Illinois, in June 1953. Before competing in the 1953 Miss Universe contest, Hansen planned to study animal husbandry in Colorado. She had mailed her tuition for admission to college, aspiring to become a veterinarian.

== Beauty contestant ==
Hansen was chosen as Miss Photoflash of 1953 by the Chicago Press Photographers Association. She was entered in the Miss USA contest by virtue of winning this title. She was 5'7" tall and weighed 125 pounds. Her measurements included a 37-inch bust, 25-inch waist, and 35-inch hips. She is a blonde with brown eyes. By the end of 1955, her bust had increased by an inch. Her measurements read 38-25-35.

For winning the Miss USA crown, Hansen was awarded a Hillman Minx convertible, a Universal Pictures contract, and a $2,500 diamond wrist watch. She also received an ornate trophy presented by Ruth Hampton, actress, and 1952 Miss New Jersey USA.

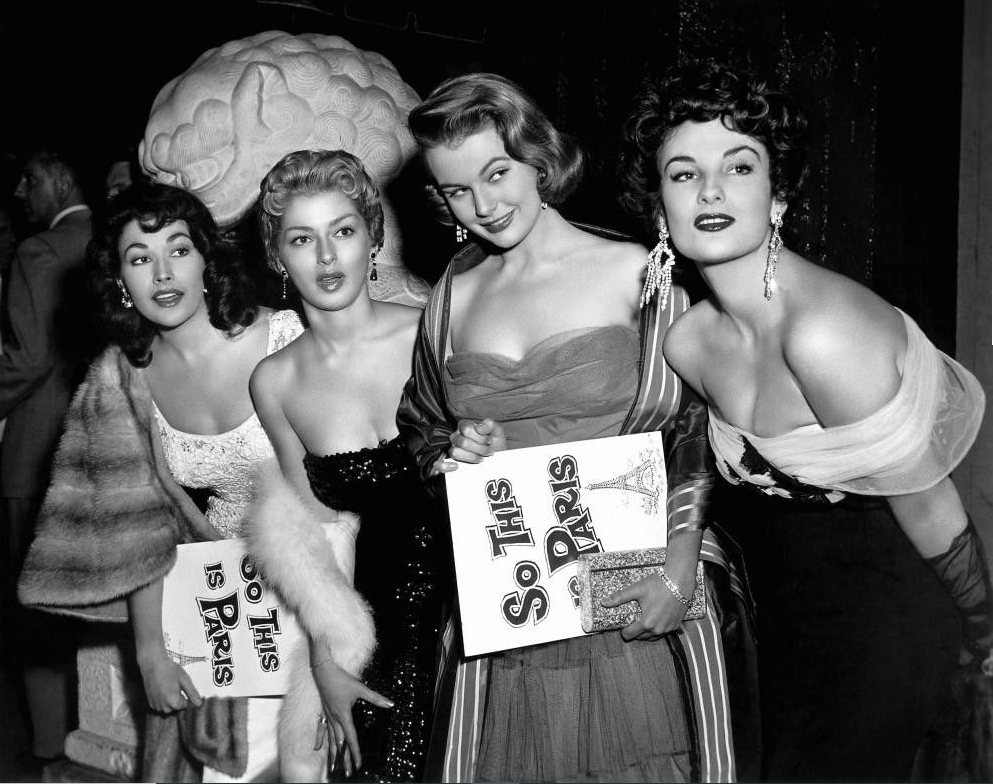
From left to right, Mara Corday, Kathleen Hughes, Hansen, and Allison Hayes in So This Is Paris (1955)

=== Finalist as Miss Universe ===
After winning the Miss Illinois USA crown, Hansen, from Chicago, became Illinois's first representative to capture the Miss USA title. She was chosen as runner-up in the Miss Universe contest of 1953. Hedda Hopper reported in March 1954 that Hansen should have been awarded the Miss Universe title. The winner, Christiane Martel of France, was exposed as having been only age 17 when she won.

In January 1954, Hansen accompanied Martel in the 65th annual Tournament of Roses Parade. They were aboard the float titled American Heritage. It was an entry of the city of Long Beach, California. Adorned by cupids and thousands of white orchids and chrysanthemums, the float captured the sweepstakes prize.

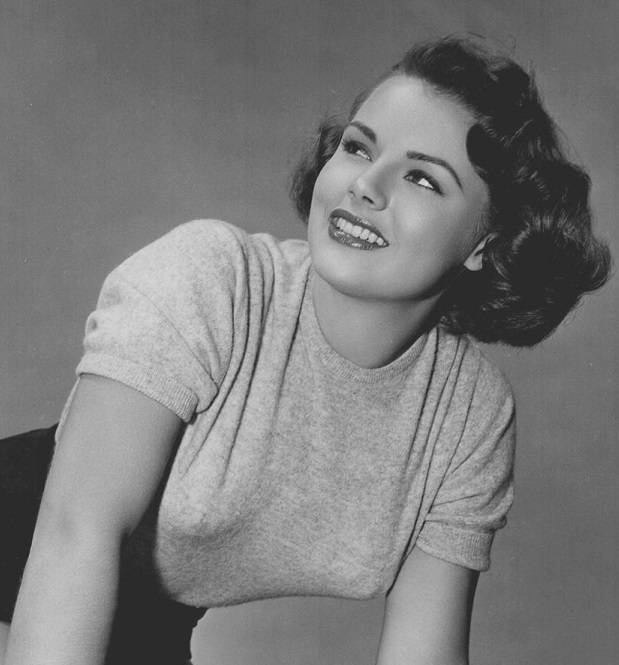
Press photo of Hansen published (1955)

== Film actress ==
Hansen negotiated a new seven-year contract with Universal in August 1954. The agreement stipulated that her salary would start at $200 weekly, with options to $900. As a minor, she was required to purchase a $25 U.S. savings bond weekly.

Soon after her contract was negotiated, Hansen filmed The Purple Mask (1955). Her character, Constance de Voulois, was one of three female spies in the film. The setting was in France after the French Revolution. She followed this project with a role as the fiancée of Jack Kelly in Cult of the Cobra (1955). She played a showgirl in Party Girl (1958), a film which featured Robert Taylor and Cyd Charisse. Her final parts in movies were roles in Goodbye Charlie (1964) and Black Caesar (1973).

== Television ==
In December 1955, Hansen made her television debut on The George Burns and Gracie Allen Show. Her appearance for eight minutes on the show was longer than her total time on screen in the 15 movies she had made. She was featured in two additional appearances as the love interest of Ronnie Burns. She performed in episodes of The Thin Man (1957), Hawaiian Eye (1960), 77 Sunset Strip (1960), Westinghouse Playhouse (1960), Straightaway (1962), and Green Acres (1971).

In 1959, Hansen did advertising for the American sunscreen brand Coppertone as a model.

== Personal life ==
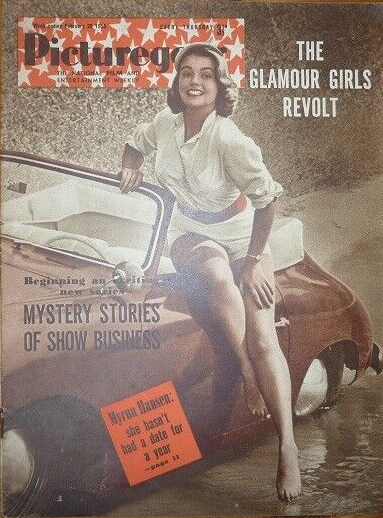
Hansen in Picturegoer No. 1034 issued on 26 Feb. 1955

Hansen married Lee Hyatt, a salesman who later became a realtor. After their divorce, she married Allen Kane, who had been married to Gloria Pall. They later divorced. She has two children

After retiring, she made occasional appearances on television series such as Vicki! and Family Feud.

In July 2022, Hansen was profiled in Classic Images, where she discussed her onscreen career.

== Filmography ==
- Man Without a Star (1955)
- Cult of the Cobra (1955)
- There's Always Tomorrow (1956)
- Raintree County (1957)
- Party Girl (1958)
- The Best of Everything (1959)
- Goodbye Charlie (1964)

== Notes ==
- Long Beach Independent, Hansen Gains Inch, TV Role in Year, December 9, 1955, page 49
- Long Beach Press-Telegram, Myrna Works Hard to Become Actress, August 12, 1957, page 10
- Long Beach Press-Telegram, Beauty Winner to Marry, February 10, 1961, page 27
- Los Angeles Times, Enters Miss Universe Contest, July 5, 1953, page A
- Los Angeles Times, Illinois Girl Selected as Miss United States, July 16, 1953, page 5
- Los Angeles Times, Miss Universe and Rich Mate Reported Apart, March 19, 1954, page 2
- Los Angeles Times, Court Approves Film Pact of 1953 Miss USA, August 13, 1954, page 21
- Los Angeles Times, Myrna Hansen Joins Feminine Spies, October 9, 1954, page A9
- Los Angeles Times, Myrna Hansen Picks Up Her $2,400 in Bonds, August 26, 1955, page A1
- New York Times, Long Beach Float Wins Roses Prize, January 2, 1954, page 13
- New York Times, Raintree County Has Festive Debut, October 3, 1957, page 32
- New York Times, Screen: Old-Hat Gunplay, October 29, 1958, page 30
- Pasadena Independent, I Tan Faster with Coppertone, May 29, 1959, page 4
- Reno Evening Gazette, Ex-Miss USA Divorced, June 24, 1965, page 29
