= Mara Corday =

American actress (1930–2025)

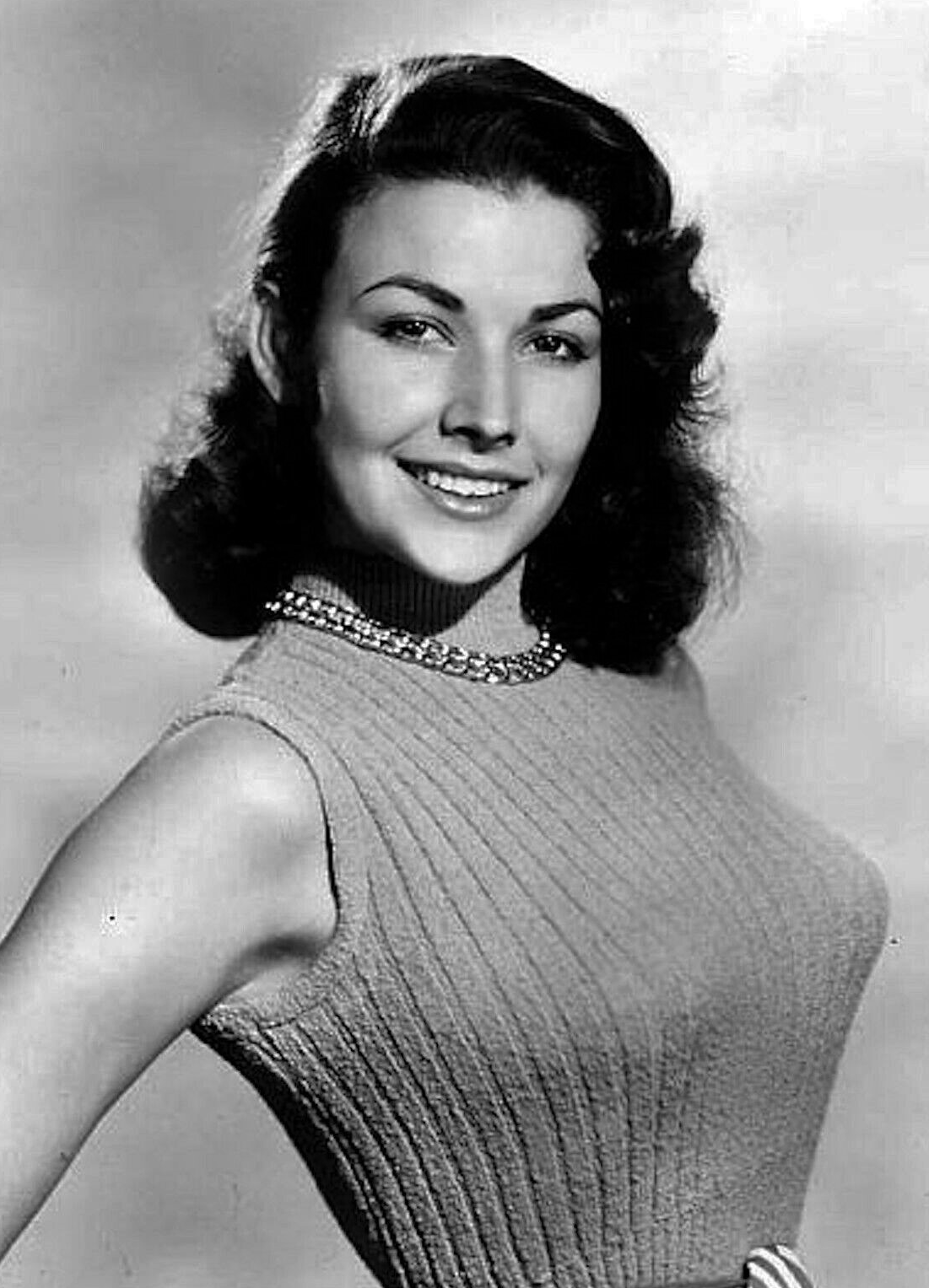
- Publicity still for Man Without a Star (1955)
- Born: Marilyn Joan Watts; January 3, 1930; Santa Monica, California, U.S.
- Died: February 9, 2025 (aged 95); Valencia, California, U.S.
- Occupations: Actress; showgirl; model
- Years active: 1948–1990
- Known for: Tarantula; The Giant Claw; The Man from Bitter Ridge; Sudden Impact; The Black Scorpion; The Gauntlet; Man Without a Star; Raw Edge
- Height: 5 ft 5 in (165 cm)
- Spouse: Richard Long (m. 1957; died 1974)
- Children: 3
- Website: http://www.Maracorday.com

Marilyn Joan Long (née Watts; January 3, 1930 – February 9, 2025), known professionally as Mara Corday, was an American actress, showgirl, model and Playboy Playmate who was a 1950s cult figure during the Golden Age of Hollywood.

== Early life ==
Marilyn Joan Watts was born in Santa Monica, California, on January 3, 1930. Wanting a career in films, she came to Hollywood while still in her teens and found work as a showgirl at the Earl Carroll Theatre on Sunset Boulevard. Her physical beauty brought jobs as a photographer's model that led to a bit part as a showgirl in the 1951 film Two Tickets to Broadway.

== Dancing ==
One of Corday's first professional jobs was as a dancer in the Earl Carroll Revue in Hollywood. Accompanied by her mother, Corday auditioned when she was 15 years old. During the 2½ years that she was in the show, she advanced "from showgirl to actress in the sketches". This was also when she adopted the stage name Mara Corday, because it made her seem more exotic. The name Mara came from a bongo player who called her Marita when Corday was working as an usher at the Mayan Theater; the name Corday was lifted from a bottle of perfume.

== Film ==
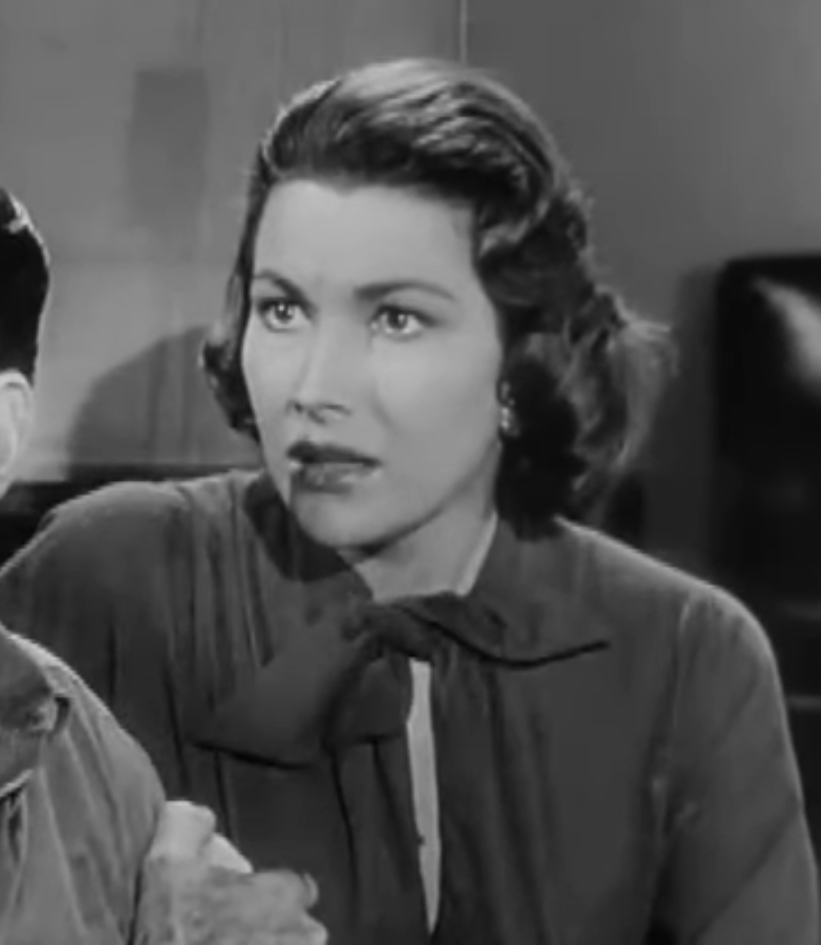
Corday in The Giant Claw (1957)

Corday signed with Universal-International Pictures as a contract player, where she was given small roles in various B-movies and television series. In 1954, while on the set of Playgirl, she met actor and future husband Richard Long.

Her acting roles were small until 1955, when she was cast opposite John Agar and Leo G. Carroll in the successful science-fiction film Tarantula, which has Clint Eastwood in a very brief role as a jet fighter pilot. She had two other co-starring roles in the genre, The Black Scorpion and The Giant Claw (both 1957), as well as in a number of Western films, including Man Without a Star, A Day of Fury, and Raw Edge. Film critic Leonard Maltin said Corday had "more acting ability than she was permitted to exhibit".

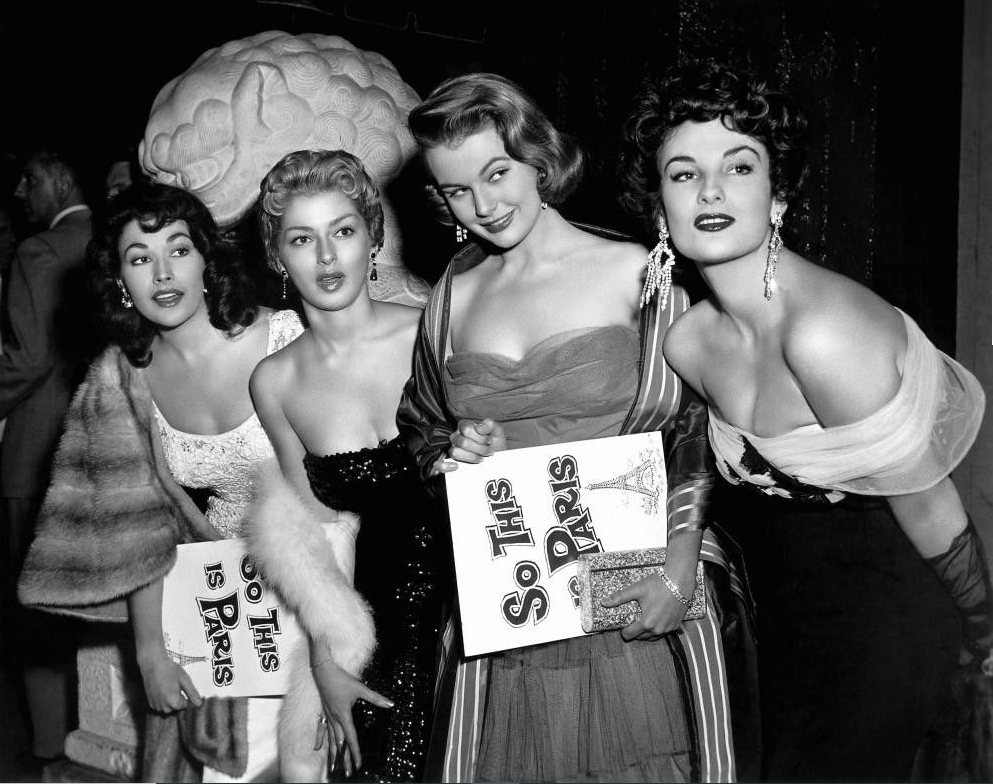
From left to right, Corday, Kathleen Hughes, Myrna Hansen, and Allison Hayes in So This Is Paris (1955)

A few years after her husband's death in 1974, Corday's old friend Eastwood offered her a chance to return to films with a role in his 1977 film The Gauntlet. She also had a brief but significant role in Sudden Impact (1983), where she played the waitress who dumped sugar into the coffee of Det. Harry Callahan in that film's iconic "Go ahead, make my day" sequence. She acted with Eastwood again in his 1989 film Pink Cadillac, as well as in her last film, 1990's The Rookie.

== Modeling ==
Corday appeared as a pinup girl in numerous men's magazines during the 1950s and was the Playmate of the October 1958 issue of Playboy, along with model Pat Sheehan.

== Television ==
In 1956, Corday had a recurring role in the ABC television series Combat Sergeant. From 1959 to early 1961, Corday worked exclusively doing guest spots on various television series, such as Peter Gunn in the episode, “Keep Smiling”. She also guest starred with Steve McQueen in Wanted: Dead or Alive in April 1960.

== Personal life and death ==
Corday began dating Richard Long following the 1955 death of his first wife Suzan Ball, and they married in 1957. Through Long's sister Barbara, Corday was a sister-in-law of actor Marshall Thompson.

In the early 1960s, Corday gave up her career to devote herself to raising her family. Widowed in 1974, she had two sons and one daughter with Long, during their 17-year marriage.

Corday had also been a friend of actor Clint Eastwood, whom she met while working for Universal Pictures.

Corday died from arteriosclerotic cardiovascular disease at her home in Valencia, California, on February 9, 2025, at the age of 95.

== Filmography ==
=== Features ===
Year	Title	Role	Notes
1951	Two Tickets to Broadway	Showgirl / Passerby on Sidewalk	Uncredited
1952	Sea Tiger	Lola, Hotel Proprietress	
1952	Son of Ali Baba	Girl on Balcony	Uncredited
1952	Toughest Man in Arizona	Bit Role	Uncredited
1953	The Lady Wants Mink	Model	
1953	Problem Girls	Dorothy Childers	
1953	Tarzan and the She-Devil	Locopo Woman	Uncredited
1953	Sweethearts on Parade	Belle	
1953	Money from Home	Waitress	Uncredited
1954	Yankee Pasha	Harem Girl	Uncredited
1954	Playgirl	Pam	
1954	Drums Across the River	Sue	
1954	Francis Joins the WACS	Kate	
1954	Dawn at Socorro	Letty Diamond	
1955	So This Is Paris	Yvonne	
1955	Man Without a Star	Moccasin Mary	
1955	The Man from Bitter Ridge	Holly Kenton	
1955	Tarantula	Stephanie 'Steve' Clayton	
1955	Foxfire	Maria - Hugh Slater's Nurse	
1956	Raw Edge	Paca	
1956	A Day of Fury	Sharman Fulton	
1956	Naked Gun	Louisa Jackson / Morales	
1957	The Quiet Gun	Irene	
1957	The Giant Claw	Sally Caldwell	
1957	Undersea Girl	Valerie Hudson	
1957	The Black Scorpion	Teresa Alvarez	
1958	Girls on the Loose	Vera Parkinson	
1977	The Gauntlet	Jail Matron	
1983	Sudden Impact	Loretta - Coffee Shop Waitress	
1989	Pink Cadillac	Stick Lady	
1990	The Rookie	Interrogator #2	Final film role

=== Partial television credits ===
Year	Title	Role	Notes
1951	The Adventures of Kit Carson	Lola La Vada/Janet Cronin /Juanita	3 episodes
1952-1953	Craig Kennedy, Criminologist	Lucille Merrill/ Mae Gibson/ Greta Varden	3 episodes
1953	The Adventures of Kit Carson	Mrs. Drake	Episode: "Ventura Feud"
1953	Mr. and Mrs. North	Cynthia Stone	Episode: "The Third Eye"
1959	The Restless Gun	Della	Episode: "Shadow of a Gunfighter"
1959	Peter Gunn	Emily - Blackmailer	Episode: "Keep Smiling"
1959	Tales of Wells Fargo	Ruby	Episode: "The Train Robbery"
1959	The Man from Blackhawk	Annabel	Episode: "Contraband Cargo"
1960	Adventures in Paradise	Angel	Episode: "Walk Through the Night"
1961	Surfside 6	Bonnie Scott	Episode: "An Overdose of Justice"

== See also ==
- List of people in Playboy 1953–1959

Elizabeth Ann Roberts	Cheryl Kubert	Zahra Norbo	Felicia Atkins	Lari Laine	Judy Lee Tomerlin
Linné Ahlstrand	Myrna Weber	Teri Hope	Mara Corday, Pat Sheehan	Joan Staley	Joyce Nizzari
