= Raw Edge =

1956 film by John Sherwood

- Film poster by Reynold Brown
- Directed by: John Sherwood
- Screenplay by: Harry Essex; Robert Hill
- Story by: William Kozelenko; James Benson Nablo
- Produced by: Albert Zugsmith
- Starring: Rory Calhoun; Yvonne De Carlo; Mara Corday; Rex Reason; Neville Brand
- Cinematography: Maury Gertsman
- Edited by: Russell F. Schoegarth
- Color process: Technicolor
- Production company: Universal Pictures
- Distributed by: Universal Pictures
- Release date: March 24, 1956
- Running time: 77 minutes
- Country: United States
- Language: English

Raw Edge is a 1956 American Technicolor Western film directed by John Sherwood starring Rory Calhoun, Yvonne De Carlo and Mara Corday. It was produced and distributed by Universal Pictures. It marked the movie debut of John Gavin under the name "John Gilmore".

== Plot ==
In 1842, a wealthy Oregon man named Montgomery makes the rules, including one that any unmarried woman must go with whichever man puts in a claim for her. After his wife Hannah is attacked by an unseen man, Montgomery blames his rival, Dan Kirby. Dan's Indian wife Paca appeals to Hannah to save her husband but they are too late

Paca makes a break with Hannah to return to her people but is pursued. An Indian named Five Crows attempts to help but he is murdered. Paca is caught by a white man named Sile Doty, who forces her to return to his house as his property.

A stranger (Tex) arrives at the Montgomery ranch, asking for directions to Dan Kirby's ranch. Hannah tells him, but Tex finds Kirby dead. He heads into town and asks for work at the saloon. He's directed to Sile Doty's ranch.

There he meets his former sister-in-law Paca and reveals he is Kirby's brother, a former Texas Ranger. She explains that she is now the property of Doty and how Kirby was killed.

Tex vows revenge and waits for Montgomery to return. Tarp, his father, and the town gambler are supposed to warn Montgomery that Tex is coming for him. Indians are massing to avenge Five Crow's death, and Montgomery may be killed by them, so they head to his ranch to claim Hannah. Both argue over her.

The three descend on the Montgomery ranch and fight over Hannah who realises that Tarp Penny was the one who attacked her that night. Tex watches the scene unfold and ends up taking Hannah away.

Doty arrives with Paca at the survey site warning Montgomery that Tex is waiting for him and Indians are out for blood. Montgomery tells Paca to talk to the chief and guarantee his freedom to return to his ranch where he will give them the man that murdered Five Crows; if she won't help, he'll have her killed. He plans to frame Tex instead. Paca returns to talk to the chief.

Tarp chases Hannah and wounds her, then kills the gambler and his father. Tarp ends up in a shootout with Tex that turns into a violent fistfight after both run out of ammunition. Tex prevails when Tarp is accidentally impaled on a bison head's horns when it is knocked off the wall.

Montgomery is intercepted by an Indian party and taken to the chief. The chief promises to allow him to return to his ranch "after the ceremony." His body is dragged back to his ranch and Paca (now wearing Indian garb) rides off with the tribe, having avenged her husband's death.

Tex offers Hannah a chance to join him which she does.

== Cast ==
- Rory Calhoun as Tex Kirby
- Yvonne De Carlo as Hannah Montgomery
- Mara Corday as Paca
- Neville Brand as Tarp Penny
- Rex Reason as John Randolph
- Emile Meyer as Pop Penny
- Herbert Rudley as Gerald Montgomery
- Robert J. Wilke as Sile Doty
- John Gavin as Dan Kirby (as John Gilmore)
- Gregg Barton as McKay
- Ed Fury as Whitey
- William Schallert as Missionary

== Production ==
The film was based on an original story by William Kozlenko and James Benson Nablo. It was bought by Universal in December 1954. They assigned Albert Zugsmith to produce. Kozlenko was hired to write the script. By May 1955 Harry Essex was reported to be working on the script.

By October 1955 the lead roles had been assigned to Rory Calhoun and Yvonne De Carlo. This was De Carlo's first film at Universal, the studio where she had been a star, since 1951.

Filming took place in October 1955.
