= Sudden Impact =

1983 film by Clint Eastwood

- Theatrical release poster by Bill Gold
- Directed by: Clint Eastwood
- Screenplay by: Joseph Stinson
- Story by: Earl E. Smith; Charles B. Pierce
- Based on: Characters by: Harry Julian Fink; R.M. Fink
- Produced by: Clint Eastwood
- Starring: Clint Eastwood; Sondra Locke
- Cinematography: Bruce Surtees
- Edited by: Joel Cox
- Music by: Lalo Schifrin
- Production company: The Malpaso Company
- Distributed by: Warner Bros.
- Release date: December 9, 1983
- Running time: 117 minutes
- Country: United States
- Language: English
- Budget: $22 million
- Box office: $150 million

Sudden Impact is a 1983 American neo-noir action-thriller film, the fourth in the Dirty Harry series. Clint Eastwood reprises his starring role as Inspector "Dirty" Harry Callahan and also produced and directed the film; it is his sole directorial effort in the series. The film co-stars Sondra Locke, Pat Hingle, Albert Popwell and Bradford Dillman (the latter two each making their final appearances in a Dirty Harry film).

The film tells the story of a gang-rape victim (Locke) who decides to seek revenge on her rapists 10 years after the attack by killing them one by one. Inspector Callahan (Eastwood), famous for his unconventional and often brutal crime-fighting tactics, is tasked with tracking down the serial killer. The film was written by Joseph Stinson from a story by Earl E. Smith and Charles B. Pierce, while composer and series regular Lalo Schifrin returned to score the film’s soundtrack after a one-film absence.

The film is notable for the catchphrase "Go ahead, make my day", written by John Milius and uttered by Clint Eastwood's gun-wielding character at the beginning of the film as he stares down an armed robber who is holding a hostage.

== Plot ==
In 1973, artist Jennifer Spencer and her sister, Beth, are gang raped; the attack leaves Beth in a catatonic state. Ten years later, Spencer uses a .38 Special to kill George Wilburn, one of the rapists, in San Francisco and returns to San Paulo, (Note: This town is fictional.) looking for the remaining criminals. Meanwhile, Inspector Harry Callahan is frustrated when another judge dismisses a case due to his direct methods. At his favorite diner, Callahan foils a robbery, killing three criminals in the process while the last one surrenders. He later causes local crime lord Threlkis to suffer a fatal heart attack after personally insulting him in front of his family at his daughter's wedding.

Unable to fire him because his methods "get results", Callahan's superiors instead order him to take a vacation. Four of Threlkis' hitmen eventually attack him. Callahan takes down three, while the fourth escapes. Later, the suspect from the dismissed case and his friends throw Molotov cocktails into Callahan's car. Acting in self-defense, he kills his pursuers when their car drives off the pier. To get Harry out of sight until the furor dies down, Callahan is sent to San Paulo.

Upon arrival, Callahan chases down a robber. The reckless but successful pursuit angers the San Paulo police. While jogging with his bulldog, Meathead (a gift from SFPD colleague, Horace), Callahan accidentally runs into Spencer. On returning to his room at a motel, he is targeted by the surviving Threlkis hitman, who is killed by Callahan. Meanwhile, Spencer kills Kruger, a second rapist. Callahan recognizes the modus operandi, but Lester Jannings, San Paulo's police chief, refuses to work with him.

Callahan learns both victims are friends of Jannings' son, Alby. Ray Parkins, the female member of the gang of rapists, figures out they are being targeted, and warns two of the remaining men, Tyrone and Mick. At an outdoor cafe, Callahan meets Spencer again. Over drinks, he learns that she shares his emphasis on results over methods when seeking justice, to a point, but he adds the caveat "'til it breaks the law." Callahan reveals that he is investigating Wilburn's murder, which rattles Spencer. Later, he finds Tyrone dead, shot in the genitals and the head, just as the previous victims.

To be more protected, Mick stays with Parkins at her place. While visiting them for questioning, Mick attacks Callahan. After Callahan subdues Mick and takes him to the police station, Spencer guns down Parkins.

Callahan and Spencer meet again and sleep together. On his way back to the motel, Callahan notices her car, which he had seen earlier at Parkins' place. Returning there, he finds Parkins' body. Two of Mick's friends bail him out of jail. Meanwhile, Callahan's partner Horace arrives at the motel to celebrate the easing of tensions in San Francisco. He meets Mick and his henchmen, instead, who have been waiting to spring an ambush. Mick's gang kills Horace and neuters Meathead with a switchblade. They then beat up Callahan before throwing him off a pier, presuming he will drown.

Spencer arrives at the Jannings home with the intention of killing Alby, another one of the rapists. To her surprise, Alby, like her sister, is catatonic; a guilty conscience caused him to attempt suicide, which left him with permanent brain damage. To protect his own reputation and his only child, Jannings refused to jail the guilty parties. He convinces Spencer to spare Alby's life and promises Mick will be punished. Mick and his henchmen, however, arrive and capture Spencer, using her gun to kill Jannings.

Enraged by the attacks to Horace and Meathead, Callahan goes after Mick's gang with his .44 Automag. The gang brings Spencer to the boardwalk for another rape but are startled by Callahan's apparent return from the dead. Callahan chases Mick after killing his henchmen. Mick drags Spencer to the top of a roller coaster, where she breaks free. Callahan shoots Mick, who falls from the top of the coaster, crashes through the glass roof of the carousel below, and is impaled on the horn of its unicorns.

As the local cops deal with the crime scene, Spencer asks Harry, "what happens now?" Before he can answer, she goes on an angry tirade, talking about rights and justice, saying Harry will never understand. A policeman informs Harry they have found a .38 on Mick. Ballistics, Callahan replies, will prove that "his gun … was used in all the killings," telling the cop that, "it's over." Callahan and Spencer leave the crime scene together.

== Cast ==
- Clint Eastwood as Inspector Harry Callahan
- Sondra Locke as Jennifer Spencer
- Pat Hingle as Chief Lester Jannings
- Bradford Dillman as Captain Briggs
- Paul Drake as Mick
- Michael Maurer as George Wilburn
- Albert Popwell as Horace King
- Audrie J. Neenan as Ray Parkins
- Jack Thibeau as Kruger
- Michael Currie as Lieutenant Donnelly
- Michael V. Gazzo as Threlkis
- Kevyn Major Howard as Hawkins
- Bette Ford as Leah
- Nancy Parsons as Mrs. Kruger
- Mara Corday as Coffee Shop Waitress
- Mark Keyloun as Officer Bennett
- Lisa Britt as Elizabeth Spencer
- Camryn Manheim as Girl in elevator

== Production ==
The script was initially written by Charles B. Pierce and Earl E. Smith for a separate film for Locke, but was later adapted into a Dirty Harry film by Joseph Stinson. Filming occurred in spring 1983. Many of the film's scenes were filmed in San Francisco and Santa Cruz, California. The scene where Harry chases a bank robber in the downtown business district offers a rare glimpse of the area before it was devastated by the Loma Prieta earthquake of October 17, 1989. Footage for the robbery in "Acorn Cafe" was shot at Burger Island, later a McDonald's and now the site of a hotel, at the corner of 3rd and Townsend in San Francisco. Santa Cruz Beach Boardwalk was the amusement park where the climactic scene was filmed. At this point in his career, Eastwood was receiving a salary that included 60% of all film profits, leaving the other 40% for the studio. Estimates had Eastwood earning $30 million for Sudden Impact.

It was Locke's last film to be widely released. Perpetuating a career-long pattern that saw her playing protagonists much younger than herself, (Note: It was 1967 when Locke erected a smokescreen over her age. She was 23 in 1967, but told the press she was only 17. Locke later admitted to lying about her age, but still lied about how many years she had shaved off.) at 39, Locke was older than the group of actors cast as the rapists and 21 years older than the youth catcalling her near the start of the movie. She was six years older than Audrie Neenan, though the character of Parkins is clearly meant to be older than Spencer. Moreover, the actress who played Locke's sister was 11½ years her junior.

Sudden Impact is the third film of the series to be scored by Lalo Schifrin (Jerry Fielding was in charge of the music on the previous film).

== Reception ==
=== Box office ===
In its opening weekend, the film took $9,688,561 in 1,530 theaters in the US. In total in the US and Canada, the film made $67,642,693, making it the highest grossing of the five films in the Dirty Harry franchise. The film also surpassed the $63.6 million gross of Thunderball (1965) to become the highest-grossing fourth installment of a film in the United States and Canada. Worldwide, it grossed more than $150 million.

=== Critical response ===
Review aggregation website Rotten Tomatoes retrospectively gave the film a score of 52% with a mean of 5.6 of a possible 10 based on 42 reviews. The consensus reads: "Sudden Impact delivers all the firepower – and the most enduring catchphrase – fans associate with the Dirty Harry franchise, but it's far from the best film in the series."

Vincent Canby criticized the film, stating: "The screenplay is ridiculous, and Mr. Eastwood's direction of it primitive, which is surprising because he has shown himself capable in such films as The Outlaw Josey Wales and The Gauntlet. Among other things, the movie never gets a firm hold on its own continuity. Sometimes scenes of simultaneous action appear to take place weeks or maybe months apart." Roger Ebert was more positive, awarding three stars out of four; while noting that the film was "implausible" with "a cardboard villain", he also praised it as "a Dirty Harry movie with only the good parts left in" and "a great audience picture." Variety noted that "everything is pitched for maximum action impact, so audiences should feel they got their money's worth," but also thought that the action scenes put "too much reliance on characters, particularly Harry, being in the right place at the right time." Gene Siskel of the Chicago Tribune gave the film two stars out of four and wrote that nothing in the Dirty Harry sequels "has ever come close to the evil Scorpio in its portrayal of a bad guy. Because of that they are lesser films. We never feel that Harry is in any real danger." Kevin Thomas of the Los Angeles Times slammed the film as "the exploitation picture at its most nakedly manipulative," which "doesn't just exploit sex and violence but also audience prejudices toward minorities. (True, Callahan's partner, played by Albert Popwell, is black, but he's around only briefly.) That it exploits with sleek cinematic skill—not to mention a great deal of righteousness—makes it all the more reprehensible." A negative review from Pauline Kael in The New Yorker remarked that the film "might be mistaken for parody if the sledgehammer-slow pacing didn't tell you that the director (Eastwood) wasn't in on the joke."

== Legacy ==
Sudden Impact is best remembered for Harry's catchphrase, "Go ahead, make my day". United States President Ronald Reagan used the "make my day" line in a March 1985 speech threatening to veto legislation raising taxes. When campaigning for office as mayor of Carmel-by-the-Sea, California, in 1986, Eastwood used bumper stickers entitled "Go Ahead — Make Me Mayor".

Excerpts from the dialogue of the French-dubbed version can be heard in the movie La Haine (1995).

The film is recognized by American Film Institute in these lists:

- 2005: AFI's 100 Years...100 Movie Quotes:
  - Harry Callahan: "Go ahead, make my day." – #6

"Make My Day" is a novelty song recorded by American country music artist T. G. Sheppard featuring Clint Eastwood. It was released in February 1984 as the second single from the album Slow Burn. The song reached #12 on the Billboard Hot Country Singles & Tracks chart. The song was written by Dewayne Blackwell.

== See also ==
- Dirty Harry (1971)
- Magnum Force (1973)
- The Enforcer (1976)
- The Dead Pool (1988)

== Bibliography ==
- Hughes, Howard (2009). Aim for the Heart. London: I.B. Tauris. ISBN 978-1-84511-902-7.
- Munn, Michael (1992). Clint Eastwood: Hollywood's Loner. London: Robson Books. ISBN 0-86051-790-X.
- Street, Joe (2016). Dirty Harry's America: Clint Eastwood, Harry Callahan, and the Conservative Backlash. University Press of Florida. ISBN 978-0-8130-6167-2.
