= The Man from Bitter Ridge =

1955 film by Jack Arnold

- Directed by: Jack Arnold
- Written by: Teddi Sherman (Adaptation by)
- Screenplay by: Lawrence Roman
- Produced by: Howard Pine
- Starring: Lex Barker; Mara Corday; Stephen McNally
- Cinematography: Russell Metty
- Edited by: Milton Carruth
- Color process: Eastmancolor
- Production company: Universal Pictures
- Distributed by: Universal Pictures
- Release date: April 12, 1955 (United States)
- Running time: 80 minutes
- Country: United States
- Language: English

The Man from Bitter Ridge is a 1955 American Western film directed by Jack Arnold and starring Lex Barker, Mara Corday and Stephen McNally.

== Plot ==
A special investigator, Jeff Carr (Lex Barker), is deployed to the cattle town of Tomahawk to collect evidence on a number of stagecoach holdups and killings. The town's leading banker-politician Ranse Jackman (John Dehner) and his gunslinging brothers resent Carr's inquiries, and blame the robberies on the upland sheepherders, led by Alec Black (Stephen McNally). Carr quickly discovers that Jackman and his henchman are the actual culprits, but a romantic conflict arises when Carr falls in love with shepherdess Holly Kenton (Mara Corday), the woman who Alec Black is also courting.

Carr and Black ultimately join forces, killing Ranse Jackman and his brothers in a climactic gunfight. Jeff and Holly make plans to marry.

== Cast ==
- Lex Barker as Jeff Carr
- Mara Corday as Holly Kenton
- Stephen McNally as Alec Black
- John Dehner as Rance Jackman
- Trevor Bardette as Sheriff Dunham
- Ray Teal as Shep Bascom
- Warren Stevens as Linc Jackman
- Myron Healey as Clem Jackman
- John Harmon as Norman Roberts
- John Cliff as Wolf Landers
- Richard Garland as Jace Gordon

== Production ==
Filmmaker Jack Arnold on directing Lex Barker:

The first day Lex came on the set, I had never seen anyone as nervous as he was. I started to stage the scene, and he just ran out of the set. So I told everyone to go get coffee and I went over to Lex to calm him down…”Believe me Lex, you can trust me. I will not print anything that’s bad.” And I won his confidence…So I had to baby him along and he was so grateful he gave me a gold tomahawk with a pearl handle [the film was originally titled Tomahawk]…Lex was a wonderful guy, I loved him, and I got to know him very well.

Film critic Dana M. Reemes reports “without doubt, The Man From Bitter Ridge is one of Lex Barker’s best performances.”

== Critical assessment ==
Describing The Man From Bitter Ridge as “a superb example of its genre and period,” biographer and film critic Dana M. Reemes notes actor Mara Corday's merits:

The aficionado of fifties popular culture will be highly entertained by Miss Corday’s wonderfully fashionable western attire. Though supposedly the daughter of impoverished sheep ranchers, she sports the latest in ladies’ riding gear, her orange-red lipstick in perfect color coordination with her neckerchief. Miss Corday is a delightful screen presence, full-figured yet petite and refined, who mounts her horse with agility, grace and sensuality.

Reemes adds that “a fuller disclosure of Miss Corday’s charms may be found in the October 1958 issue of Playboy magazine.”

== See also ==
- List of American films of 1955

== Sources ==
- Reemes, Dana M. 1988. Directed by Jack Arnold. McFarland & Company, Jefferson, North Carolina 1988. ISBN 978-0899503318
