= Cult of the Cobra =

1955 film by Francis D. Lyon

- Theatrical release poster by Reynold Brown
- Directed by: Francis D. Lyon
- Screenplay by: Jerry Davis; Cecil Maiden; Richard Collins
- Story by: Jerry Davis
- Produced by: Howard Pine
- Starring: Faith Domergue; Kathleen Hughes; Richard Long; Jack Kelly; David Janssen; Marshall Thompson; Edward Platt; Myrna Hansen
- Cinematography: Russell Metty
- Edited by: Milton Carruth
- Music by: Irving Gertz, William Lava, Lou Maury, Stanley Wilson (all uncredited)
- Distributed by: Universal-International
- Release date: March 11, 1955
- Running time: 82 minutes
- Country: United States
- Language: English

Cult of the Cobra is a 1955 American black-and-white horror film from Universal-International Pictures, produced by Howard Pine, directed by Francis D. Lyon, that stars Faith Domergue, Richard Long, Kathleen Hughes, Marshall Thompson, Jack Kelly, William Reynolds, and David Janssen. The film was released as a double feature with Revenge of the Creature on March 11, 1955.

In the film, six American enlisted men witness the secret ritual of Lamians (worshipers of women who can change into serpents). When the soldiers are discovered by the snake cult, the High Lamian Priestess vows that "the Cobra Goddess will avenge herself". A mysterious woman enters into the life of each service man, with disastrous results: "accidents" begin to happen, and before each death the shadow of a cobra is seen.

Critics noted story similarities with Val Lewton's earlier horror film Cat People, released in 1942.

== Plot ==
Before shipping home at the end of World War II, American Army Air Force enlisted men, Paul Able, Tom Markel, Nick Hommel, Pete Norton, Rico Nardi, and Carl Turner explore an Asian bazaar. There, they meet Daru, a snake charmer. Paul mentions the cult of the Lamians, who worship snakes. Daru says that if the soldiers pay him, they can see it for themselves. He brings the group to the Lamian temple, warning that they will die if caught. In disguise, they see a dance about the Lamian cobra goddess. As the dancer slides back into a woven basket, a drunk Nick photographs her. The Lamians are outraged, and their priest curses the intruders. Freeing himself from two Lamians, Nick grabs the basket. The Lamians kill Daru, and the servicemen set the temple afire to cover their escape. Fleeing in a jeep, the group stops when they see Nick on the road with a woman standing over him. A snake has bitten him.

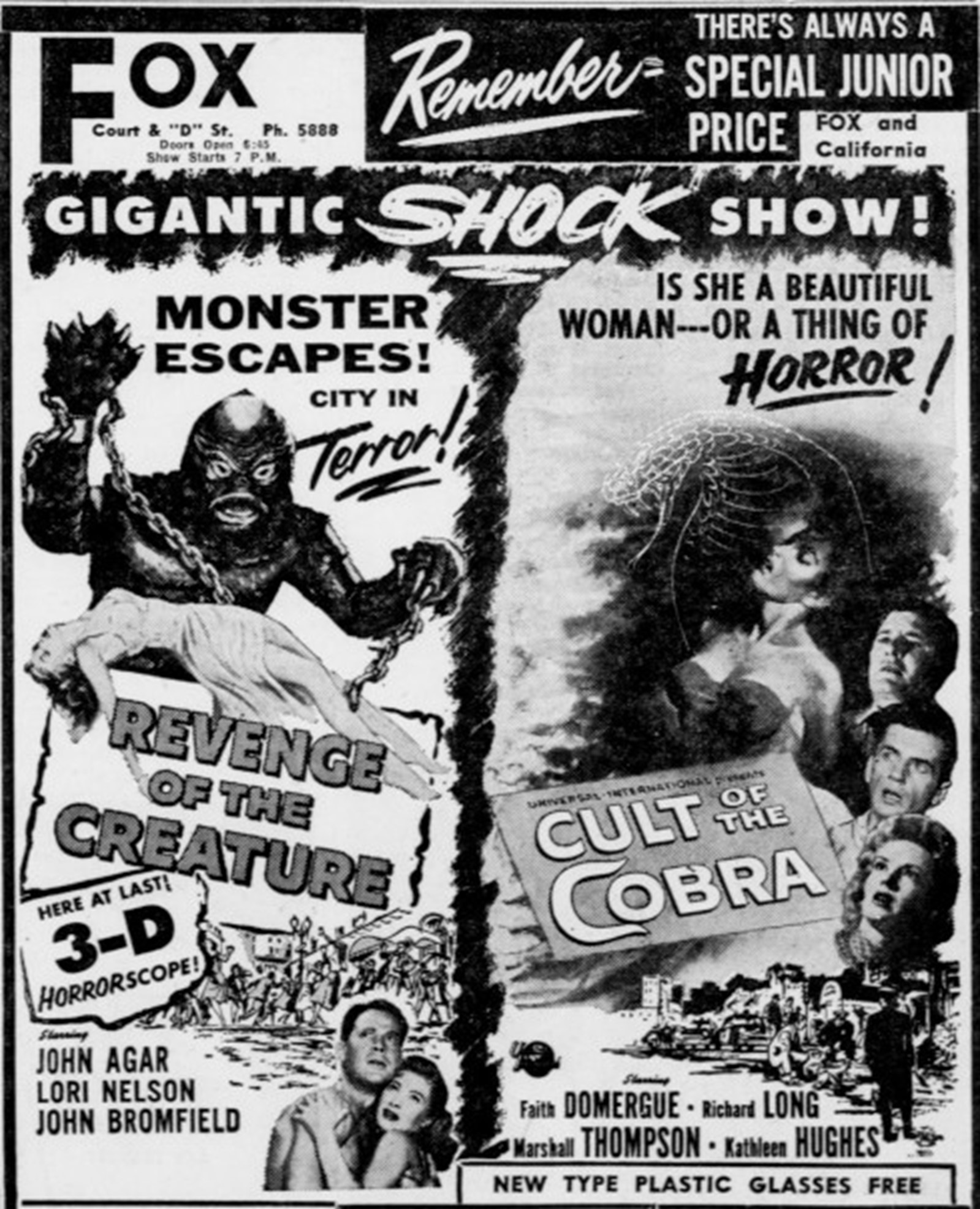
Advertisement from 1955 for Cult of the Cobra and co-feature, Revenge of the Creature.

In the hospital, Nick says that he can ship out the following day. As he sleeps, a cobra slips into his room through an open window and kills him. Nick's doctors recant their earlier statement that the venom had been purged from his body. The only logical explanation for Nick's death by cobra venom is that the same snake entered the hospital to bite him a second time.

Tom is dumped by his girlfriend, Julia Thompson, who decides to marry Paul instead. In his New York City apartment, Tom hears a scream from Lisa Moya, his new neighbor across the hall. He forces his way into Lisa's apartment and finds her cringing in terror from an intruder who has fled. After calming her down, he persuades her to go on a date with him.

That night, Rico the bowling alley he owns and drives home. A cobra in the back seat strikes at him. The car swerves, crashes, and flips over, killing him.

Carl and Pete, who are roommates, host a party. Carl flirts with Lisa, and a jealous Tom punches him. Tom and Lisa leave. Tom is increasingly smitten with Lisa, who remains standoffish. She returns to Carl's apartment when the party is over and Carl is cleaning up. While fixing Lisa a drink, he sees a cobra in the room and throws a statue at it. The cobra drives him backward out an open window. Bystanders gather. Pete returns and notices Lisa in the crowd.

Tom and Paul become suspects in Carl's death due to the altercation at the party. To redirect their suspicions, Paul tells the police about his theory that Lisa is killing them to make the Lamian curse appear real, but he has no evidence beyond Lisa being new in the neighborhood. Lisa tells Tom that she loves him, but also fears that she is a danger to him and talks about beliefs which she has found to be not true. Tom questions her, but she refuses to explain further.

Pete confronts Lisa about seeing her at the scene of Carl's death, and examines her arm in search of a scratch from the broken statue. Lisa transforms into a cobra and attacks him. Toxicology tests indicate that Carl and Rico were killed by cobra venom. Though there is still nothing pointing specifically to Lisa, the police agree to hold her for questioning. Searching for her at her apartment, they find Pete's body. Paul calls Tom at the theater about Pete's death, asking him to keep Lisa busy until the police arrive. Lisa enters Julia's dressing room. When Julia returns, a cobra attacks her. Tom rushes in. Using a hall tree, he corrals the cobra and pushes it out of the window. The cobra falls, dies and transforms back into Lisa. Tom runs down to the street to view her lifeless body, then covers his face and walks away through the gathered crowd of gawkers.

== Cast ==
- Faith Domergue as Lisa Moya
- Richard Long as Paul Able
- Marshall Thompson as Tom Markel
- Kathleen Hughes as Julia Thompson
- William Reynolds as Pete Norton
- Jack Kelly as Carl Turner
- Myrna Hansen as Marian Sheehan
- David Janssen as Rico Nardi
- Leonard Strong as Daru
- James Dobson as Cpl. Nick Hommel
- Edward Platt as Snake cult priest

== Production ==
Mari Blanchard started the film, but actress Faith Domergue replaced her a few days after shooting began.

== Release ==
=== Home media ===
Universal Pictures released Cult of the Cobra on DVD as part of the box set The Classic Sci-Fi Ultimate Collection Vol. 2, which also includes Dr. Cyclops, The Land Unknown, The Deadly Mantis, and The Leech Woman. Cult of the Cobra is also part of Scream Factory's four-movie set Universal Horror Collection: Volume 6, released on August 25, 2020. It features an audio commentary on the film.

== Reception ==
The Philadelphia Inquirer was as much amused as horrified, writing that "the snaky lady goes into her reptilian act once too often and meets her doom leaving some unfinished business behind. It's all pretty silly, and ... not even remotely frightening. The cobra-conscious lads whose sight-seeing gets them into trouble are played with a minimum of conviction".

== See also ==
- List of American films of 1955
