= Dawn at Socorro =

1954 film by George Sherman

- Directed by: George Sherman
- Written by: George Zuckerman
- Produced by: William Alland
- Starring: Rory Calhoun; Piper Laurie
- Cinematography: Carl E. Guthrie
- Edited by: Edward Curtiss
- Color process: Technicolor
- Production company: Universal International Pictures
- Distributed by: Universal Pictures
- Release dates: August 27, 1954 (New York City); September 1, 1954 (Los Angeles)
- Running time: 81 minutes
- Country: United States
- Language: English
- Box office: $1.1 million

Dawn at Socorro is a 1954 American Western film directed by George Sherman and starring Rory Calhoun and Piper Laurie. It was produced and distributed by Universal Pictures. The film is set mostly in Lordsburg, New Mexico, and the spoken introduction says the story is based on an actual shootout in the town in 1871. But no such incident happened there. The plot is actually a thinly veiled fictionalization of the famous 1881 shootout near the OK Corral in Tombstone, Arizona, which pitted the Earp brothers and Doc Holliday against the Clanton Gang.

== Plot ==
A tubercular retired gunfighter (Rory Calhoun) and a saloonkeeper (David Brian) play cards, with the saloon and a dance-hall girl (Piper Laurie) at stake.

== Cast ==
- Rory Calhoun as Brett Wade
- Piper Laurie as Rannah Hayes
- David Brian as Dick Braden
- Kathleen Hughes as Clare
- Alex Nicol as Jimmy Rapp
- Edgar Buchanan as Sheriff Cauthen
- Mara Corday as Letty Diamond
- Roy Roberts as Doc Jameson
- Skip Homeier as Buddy Ferris
- James Millican as Harry McNair
- Lee Van Cleef as Earl Ferris
- Stanley Andrews Old Man Ferris
- Richard Garland as Tom Ferris
- Scott Lee as Vince McNair
- Paul Brinegar as Desk Clerk
- Philo McCullough as Rancher (as Philo McCollough)
- Forrest Taylor as Jebb Hayes

== See also ==
- List of American films of 1954
