= Joseph Stinson =

American screenwriter

- Born: United States
- Occupation: Screenwriter

Joseph Stinson (also known as Joseph C. Stinson) is an American screenwriter best known for such films as City Heat, Stick and Sudden Impact.
