= Interjet =

Low-cost airline of Mexico (2005–2020)

IATA	ICAO	Call sign
4O	AIJ	ABC AEROLINEAS
- Founded: 5 March 2005; 21 years ago
- Commenced operations: 1 December 2005; 20 years ago
- Ceased operations: December 2020; 5 years ago
- AOC #: 23IF051B
- Operating bases: Cancún; Guadalajara; Mexico City; Monterrey
- Frequent-flyer program: Club Interjet; Intertours
- Parent company: Grupo Alemán
- Headquarters: Mexico City, Mexico
- Key people: Alejandro del Valle (President and Chairman); Carlos Rello (CEO) (CFO)
- Website: interjet.com

Interjet (official legal name ABC Aerolíneas, S.A. de C.V.), also known as Interjet Airlines, was a Mexican low-cost carrier headquartered in Mexico City. The airline operated scheduled flights to and from various destinations within Mexico, as well as to and from the Caribbean, Central America, North America, and South America. The airline was a family business: until December 2010, the president and CEO was Miguel Alemán Magnani, son of Miguel Alemán Velasco, who is president of the group that owns the airline, Grupo Alemán. Alemán Velasco is in turn son of former President of Mexico Miguel Alemán Valdés, who amassed a fortune while in office from 1946 to 1952.

As of December 2020, the Interjet CFO announced the suspension of all operations and from the IATA for its non-payment of debt, primarily fuel costs. The airline's website is currently inactive, as reported by sources.

The airline also served as a sponsor for Liga MX team Club America, from 2014 to 2020.

== Company slogans ==
- 2008-2010: Spanish: Como siempre debiste de haber viajado, As you should always travel
- 2010-2012: Spanish: Vuela más y mejor por menos, Fly more and better for less
- 2012-2014: Spanish: Volando en tu misma dirección, Flying in your direction
- 2014-2019: Spanish: Como tú quieres viajar, Fly your way

== History ==
=== Foundation ===
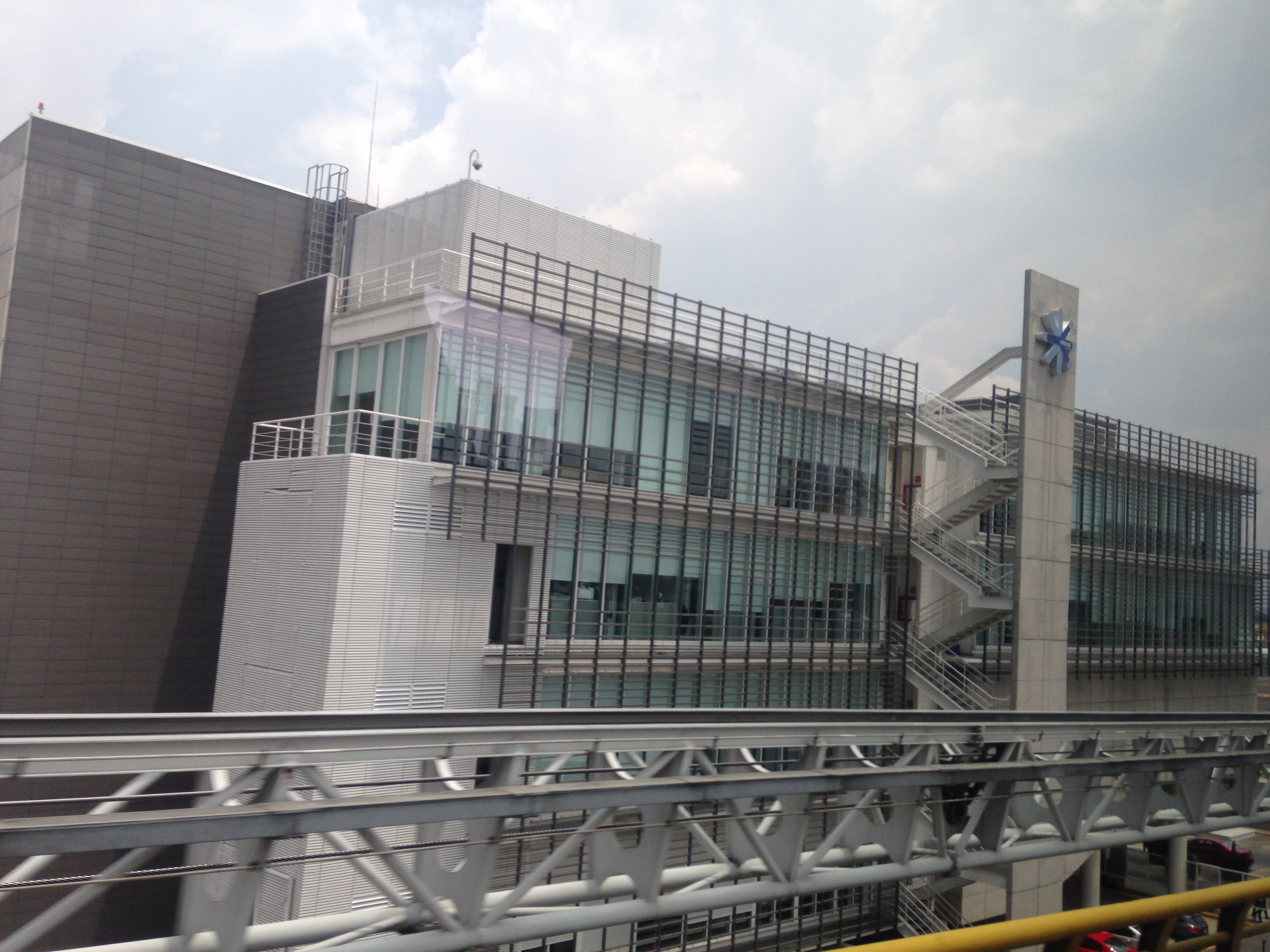
Interjet offices at Mexico City International Airport

Interjet started operations on December 1, 2005, with one Airbus A320 aircraft. The airline placed an order for 25 new A320s to replace the second-hand ones, which was increased by another ten aircraft on January 10, 2010.

Initially, most Interjet flights were to and from its hub in Toluca International Airport, which it branded "Mexico City - Toluca Airport" and which was widely seen at the time as a viable base for low-cost carrier service for the Mexico City market. By 2008 it had 14 routes from Toluca and three between other cities. After the demise of Mexico City-based competitor Aero California in August 2008, Interjet took over the vacant slots and established flight services to Mexico City International Airport.

=== Expansion and new fleet ===
On July 21, 2011, Interjet made its first flight in North America (and the fourth worldwide) using biofuel, on the Mexico City – Tuxtla Gutiérrez route, with an Airbus A320-200, registration XA-ECO.

In 2012 the airline committed to purchase the Sukhoi Superjet 100 (SSJ100), which sold for about a half the price of a comparable Bombardier Aerospace or Embraer aircraft. Interjet CEO Jose Luis Garza said it was the best choice for hot and high Mexico City, a bold bet on Russia's first major airplane since the Soviet Union collapsed.

In 2014, the airline described itself as the "JetBlue of Mexico". However, by 2018, the airline had moved to a hybrid model, with low ticket prices and high cost "extras" such as extra legroom, free legroom, but a more generous luggage policy associated with traditional carriers.

On March 2, 2015, Interjet confirmed ten SSJ100 options valued at $350 million.

In mid-January 2018, Bloomberg reported that four out of 22 of Interjet's SSJ100s were cannibalized for parts to keep others running, after having been grounded for at least five months because of SaM146 maintenance delays. This was later refuted by Interjet; a Russian magazine reported that one grounded SSJ100 was going to be back in service by January 19, and the remaining three by March.

In September 2018, Interjet was reported to be considering replacing its SSJ100s with Airbus A320neos, to make better use of its slots, with the SSJ technical problems a possible factor. This would have left CityJet as the only remaining Western customer. On September 12, Interjet denied the report.

Interjet claimed its capital cost for ten Superjets is equivalent to the pre-delivery payment for one Airbus A320. The pre-delivery payment amounts to 15-30 percent of an aircraft list price. The list price of an A320 was $88.3M in 2012.

By January 2020, Interjet confirmed that it was planning to phase out its SSJ100 fleet, and by November of that year was operating only 4 of its 22 SSJ100 models. After the carrier quit flying in December 2020 and entered bankruptcy in April 2021, its plan to try to resume operating was to attempt to return its SSJ100s to Sukhoi to cancel its debt, and fly instead with 10 Airbus A320 aircraft.

=== Financial debt, COVID-19, new CEO, and cancellations ===
With the suspension of many of its operations because of the COVID-19 pandemic, there were reports of financial problems. The airline has suspended all international operations following the pandemic. The shaky financial situation continued through 2020, with Interjet having to cancel all flights for 1 and 2 November after failing to pay for fuel. Even before the pandemic, the airline had been in financial trouble since 2013, citing unpaid taxes. The airline temporarily reduced the salaries of its workers by 50% to further cut debt. From November 30 to December 3, the airline again cancelled flights as it had still failed to pay for fuel despite its commitment to provide reimbursement by December 8, 2020. The airline didn't notify customers and staff, causing many to be stranded. In Cancún International Airport, following the cancellations, many paid up to 5,000 pesos for different airlines. The Procuraduría Federal del Consumidor (PROFECO) advised passengers against booking flights on and flying with the airline, and provided compensation for the affected customers. The airline once again cancelled all flights from December 11, 2020, until the end of January 2021, after still being unable to pay for fuel. As a result, IATA once again suspended the airline, but now entirely, and from its Billing and Settlement Plan, and advised travel agencies and GDS to suspend all ticket sales for the airline. In April, IATA dismissed the airline from the Clearing House. Despite the suspensions, the airline still remains a member of the IATA. The airline postponed its relaunch dates of December 17, December 31, and then January 11, 2021. Amidst the financial issues, Interjet's head Miguel Alemán Magnani resigned. In November 2020, Alejandro del Valle was appointed the airline's new CEO and later became chairman of the board of directors.

According to a report, the airline's unpaid taxes, bills, fees, and cancellations resulted in an embargo placed on the properties of the father of former president Miguel Alemán Magnani by the SAT, legal action by customers, and Chicago officials. Its licence to operate in Canada was suspended for failing to provide liability insurance coverage. The Secretariat of Communications and Transportation stated the airline owes up to 3 billion pesos (less than US$150 million) in debt at that time, including 2.6 billion pesos to the Mexican government. It was unable to resume operations until the remaining debt had been paid to the government, employees, and airports. A substantial percentage of their fleet had also been repossessed and grounded since April 3, 2020. Union workers had planned to go on strike on several occasions for the wages unpaid to 5,000 workers. There had been reports regarding many of the airline's staff, including pilots and maintenance workers, all refusing to work for the airline. The Confederation of Mexican Workers (CTM) stated the airline owed about 7 billion pesos (over US$350 million) in federal taxes, as well as an additional 2 billion pesos (est. US$100 million) for fuel.

Union workers had requested the Mexican government to take control of the airline, in which it declined and stated that in the event of the airline's bankruptcy, the government would lose a total of 7.350 billion pesos. Additionally, it denied the airline's request to transfer tax debts to the Servicios de Personal del Estado de México. Sources also said that 50 unpaid workers who were laid off since March 2020 filed lawsuits against the airline, stating it owed them $11 million pesos. Investors were encouraged to refuse investment and allow the airline's cessation of operations.

On December 13, 2020, the airline stated it was on the brink of bankruptcy. In an interview with a Mexican news outlet, tax authority director Raquel Buenrostro Sánchez said that the airline is already bankrupt, stating that "Interjet has no cash flow..." The airline's general director, Carlos Rello, stated that it depended on the SAT for tax payments with medical supplies in order to cover the debt and attract capital from investors.

On December 23, 2020, the Interjet Vacations brand announced on its website that its operating company, Resérvalo, filed for bankruptcy. The airline claimed that while the operating company had no relationship, it only managed commercial operations. According to a report, the Vacation brand had no social media activity since November 27, 2020, and added that hotel reservations for January 2021 were found to be invalid according to customers via social media.

On January 8, 2021, at 12:48pm, at least 5,000 of the airline's unpaid workers, including several unionized ones, went on strike after the airline missed a deadline of January 5 to reimburse months' worth of unpaid wages and benefits to the employees. They placed red and black strike flags on airports served by the airline. In addition to demanding payment, workers also protested about the airline's missed payments to Infonavit, Fonacot, and the Mexican Social Security Institute (IMSS). Following the strike, the airline's website became inactive with users reporting it to display an "HTTP Error 500" message.

Mexico's president Andrés Manuel López Obrador ruled out the possibility of a bailout from the government, stating that it "cannot be rescuing companies, [...which] was done previously and it was abused a lot." The president added that cooperating in the rescue could lead to financial debt for the government itself.

Interjet's current financial situation potentially could have led to the revival of operations for Mexicana de Aviación, a former major Mexican airline which ceased operations in 2010 due to similar financial struggles.

Former general director José Luis Garza Álvarez has founded a new airline, Aerala.

=== Bankruptcy ===
In March 2021, Interjet has officially requested to file for commercial bankruptcy by the end of the month in order to receive investment funds and resources. If unsuccessful, however, the airline would be put up for auction, according to CEO Alejandro del Valle. Additionally, the airline's Board of Director's president stated that Lufthansa Consulting has offered a deposit of $68 million, which would grant access to the Mexican market to the German-based airline consultancy. This has since been denied by Lufthansa Consulting, which stated that it "does not invest in airlines, nor is it interested in acquiring Interjet."

Interjet was still trying in early 2022 to resume limited flights using 10 Airbus A320 aircraft and potentially 10 Czech-made Let L-410 planes. However, the sub-Secretary of Transportation stated that the airline would first have to settle its current debt, about 40 billion pesos (nearly US$2 billion).

By April 2023, the federal court decided to liquidate the company and order the auction of its properties meaning Interjet will no longer fly again.

== Destinations ==
As of 2020, following financial issues and the COVID-19 pandemic, Interjet had limited flights to four cities in Mexico, including Cancún, Guadalajara, Mexico City, and Monterrey.

Interjet has served locations in Mexico, Canada, Colombia, Costa Rica, Cuba, El Salvador, Guatemala, Peru, and the United States from its bases in Cancún, Guadalajara, Mexico City, and Monterrey. Interjet has also become a popular choice for surfers traveling to Mexico because of its baggage policy of not charging extra fees for those passengers transporting a surfboard on domestic flights.

Interjet also operated several charter flights throughout the Americas, mainly in the Caribbean.

=== International ===
On July 1, 2011, Interjet began flights to its first international (and Central American) destination; to La Aurora International Airport in Guatemala City from Mexico City International Airport.

On February 23, 2012, Interjet started flights to its first U.S. destination; to Miami International Airport from Mexico City International Airport. On June 21 that year the airline began flights to its second Central America destination; to San José de Costa Rica from Mexico City International Airport.

On August 2, 2012, Interjet began flights to its second U.S. destination to John F. Kennedy International Airport in New York City from Mexico City International Airport. On August 27 the same year the airline received permission to fly to John Wayne Airport in Santa Ana, California; from Guadalajara International Airport in Guadalajara and Mexico City International Airport. The airline began daily scheduled flights six weeks later on October 11. As of July 20, 2014, Interjet had ended flights to John Wayne Airport.

Interjet intended to serve flights from Toluca to various cities in the United States, including O'Hare International Airport in Chicago, George Bush Intercontinental Airport in Houston, McCarran International Airport in Las Vegas and San Antonio International Airport in San Antonio; as of 2013, only flights to Las Vegas and San Antonio had begun, with flights to Las Vegas from Lic. Adolfo López Mateos International Airport in Toluca beginning on November 15, 2012.

On July 10, 2013, Interjet began service to El Dorado International Airport in Bogotá from Mexico City International Airport.

On June 10, 2014, Interjet and Iberia began a codeshare agreement on their flights.

On October 23, 2014, Interjet began service to Houston - George Bush Intercontinental Airport from Monterrey International Airport.

On February 18, 2016, Interjet began service to Los Angeles International Airport from Guadalajara International Airport. On May 5, 2016; Interjet began its first ever service to Jorge Chavez International Airport in Lima, Peru from Mexico City. On October 20, 2016, Interjet launched service to Los Angeles International Airport from Mexico City International Airport.

On May 15, 2017, Interjet announced its first routes to Canada, with thrice weekly flights to Montréal–Pierre Elliott Trudeau International Airport from Mexico City and Cancún with Airbus A320 aircraft. On July 28, 2017, service was launched to Toronto Pearson International Airport from Mexico City and Cancún, and on October 26, 2017, Vancouver International Airport became the third Canadian Interjet destination with service from both Mexico City and Cancún.

On March 14, 2018, Interjet began service to San Francisco International Airport from Cancún and Guadalajara.

On December 15, 2018, Interjet began service to Monseñor Óscar Arnulfo Romero International Airport in San Salvador from Mexico City.

On June 5, 2019, Interjet began service to José María Córdova International Airport in Medellín, Colombia from Mexico City and Cancún.

On October 1, 2019, Interjet began service to José Joaquín de Olmedo International Airport in Guayaquil, Ecuador from Mexico City and Cancún.

On October 28, 2019, Interjet began service to Mariscal Sucre International Airport in Quito, Ecuador from Mexico City.

On November 22, 2019, Interjet began service to Rafael Núñez International Airport in Cartagena, Colombia from Mexico City.

As of March 24, 2020, Interjet has suspended all international flights due to the COVID-19 pandemic.

The carrier quit flying altogether in December 2020 and entered bankruptcy in April 2021.

=== Codeshare agreements ===
Interjet had codeshare agreements with the following airlines:

- Air Canada
- Alitalia
- American Airlines
- All Nippon Airways
- British Airways
- Emirates
- EVA Air
- Hainan Airlines
- Iberia
- Japan Airlines
- LATAM Brasil
- LATAM Chile
- Lufthansa
- Qatar Airways

== Fleet ==
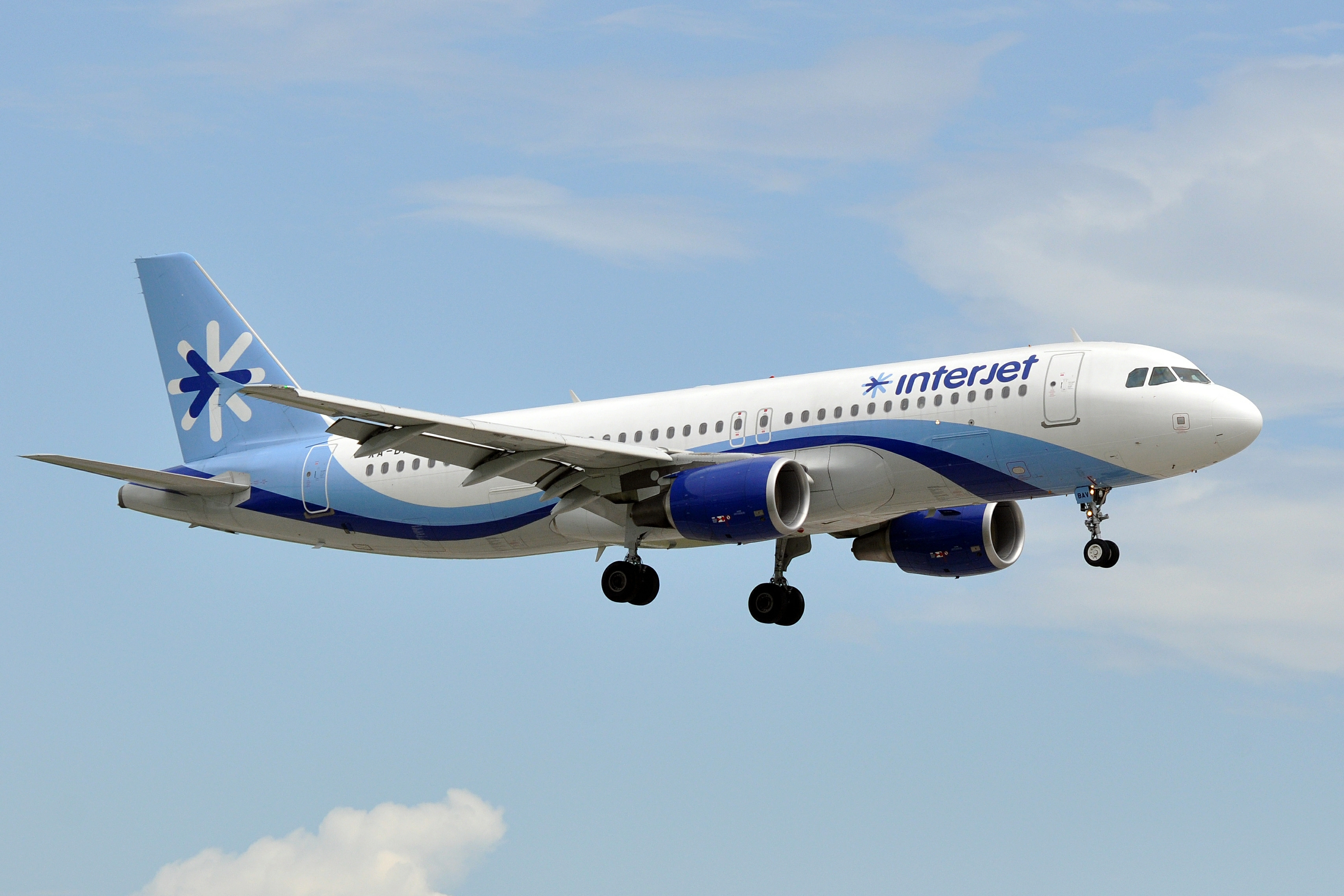
Interjet Airbus A320-200

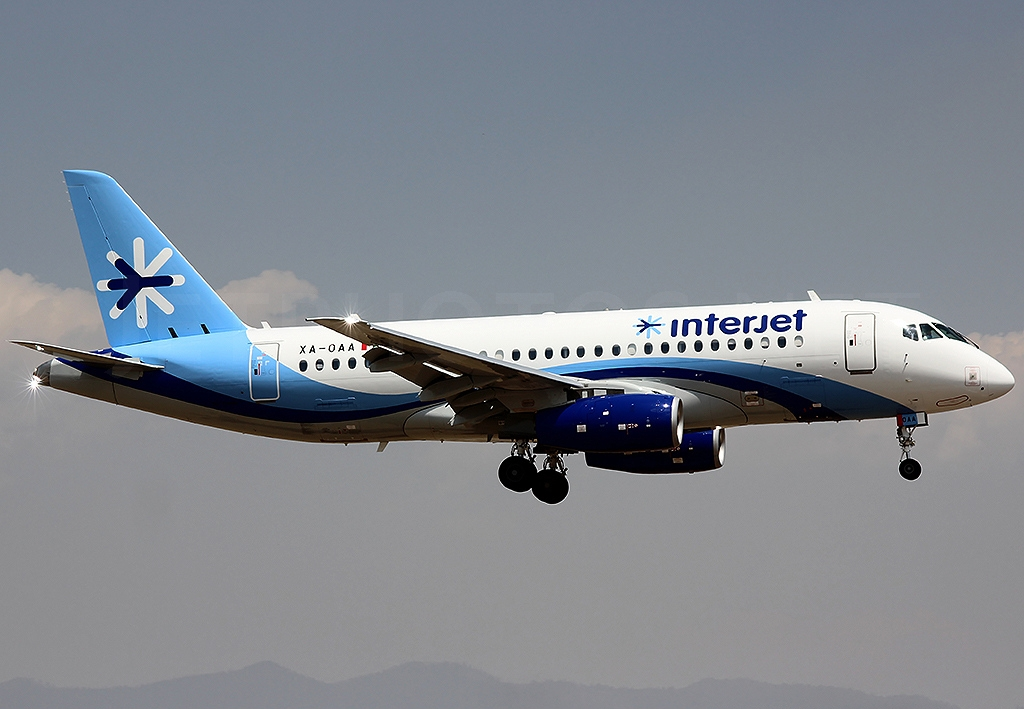
Interjet Superjet 100

In early 2020 before the COVID-19 pandemic the Interjet fleet consisted of 66 Airbus A320 family-based airplanes and 20 Sukhoi Superjet some of which were cannibalized for spares.

- Airbus A320-200
- Airbus A320neo
- Airbus A321-200
- Airbus A321neo
- Sukhoi Superjet 100-95

== Frequent-flyer program ==
Club Interjet logo

Interjet had a frequent-flyer program, called Club Interjet, in which it rewarded its members with cash instead of with points or miles.

== See also ==
- List of defunct airlines of Mexico
