= So This Is Paris (1954 film) =

Film by Richard Quine

- Theatrical release poster by Reynold Brown
- Directed by: Richard Quine
- Screenplay by: Charles Hoffman
- Produced by: Albert J. Cohen
- Starring: Tony Curtis; Gloria DeHaven; Gene Nelson; Corinne Calvet; Paul Gilbert; Mara Corday
- Cinematography: Maury Gertsman
- Edited by: Virgil Vogel
- Music by: Henry Mancini
- Production company: Universal-International
- Distributed by: Universal-International
- Release date: December 15, 1954
- Running time: 96 minutes
- Country: United States
- Language: English
- Box office: $1.5 million

So This Is Paris is a 1954 American Technicolor musical romantic comedy film directed by Richard Quine. It stars Tony Curtis (in his only film musical) and Gloria DeHaven.

== Plot ==
Joe, Al and Davy are in Paris, three sailors on a furlough. They see the sights, but have their sights set on getting to know three girls, including Colette d'Avril, a nightclub singer, and Suzzane Sorrel, who has just had her purse snatched.

Each is in for a surprise. Joe finds out that Colette is Janie Mitchell, a girl from Brooklyn. She also is raising several orphans at home with financial aid from a male benefactor. Al, meanwhile, learns that Suzzane is a high-society lady who lives in a mansion.

Complications occur when Suzzane makes a play for Joe, giving him a kiss that is photographed and appears in the next day's newspapers. Janie is not happy about that, but is grateful when the sailors organize a fund-raiser for the kids after her benefactor's death. All the boys need to get back to their ship, but promise they will be back.

== Cast ==
- Tony Curtis as Joe Maxwell
- Gloria DeHaven as Colette d'Avril / Jane Mitchell
- Gene Nelson as Al Howard
- Corinne Calvet as Suzzane Sorrel
- Paul Gilbert as Davy Jones
- Mara Corday as Yvonne
- Ann Codee as Grand'mere Marie
- Roger Etienne as Pierre Deshons
- Myrna Hansen as Ingrid
- Allison Hayes as Carmen
- Christiane Martel as Christiane
- Regina Dombek as Miss Photo Flash
- Arthur Gould-Porter as Albert, butler
- Pat Horn as dancer
- Michelle Ducasse as Simone
- Maithe Iragui as Cecile
- Lucien Plauzoles as Eugene
- Numa Lapeyre as Charlot
- Lizette Guy as Jeannine
