= Alison Martin =

American actress, writer and producer

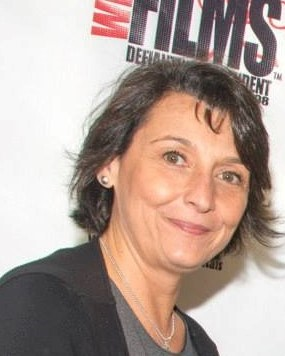
- Alison Martin "green" carpet for Favor at Dances with Films Festival June 10, 2013
- Born: September 8 New York City
- Education: Boston College
- Occupation: Actress/Writer
- Years active: 1987–present
- Spouse: Dan Hagen
- Children: Em J. and Brady J.

Alison Martin is an American character actress, writer and producer who has appeared on television, film, in podcasts and onstage. She is, along with Jean Trebek, the editor and co-founder of the podcast and online magazine insidewink. Martin made her Broadway debut playing opposite Nathan Lane in Neil Simon's Laughter on the 23rd Floor and traveled cross country on the national tour. Martin won an Emmy Award for acting in the children's television series A Likely Story for which she both wrote and acted. She garnered a second Emmy nomination for the Lifetime Channel series The World According to Us for which again she both wrote and acted.

== Early life ==
Martin was born on September 8 in the Bronx borough of New York City, the only child Joseph G. Martin and Josephine DiLorenzo, both journalists who met and married while working at the New York Daily News.

Joseph G. Martin had a career that spanned more than 45 years. As a reporter for the New York Daily News, he won nearly every possible honor for reporting: a Selurians Award (1950); two George Polk Awards (1952 and 1973) and a Newspaper Guild Page One Award (1956). In 1959, Martin won a Pulitzer Prize for international reporting for a 10-part series co-written with Philip Santori on Cuban dictator Fulgencio Batista. The piece predicted the fall of Batista months before it happened and was called “prophetic journalism” by the Pulitzer committee. Martin also served as New York Deputy Police Commissioner for public relations from 1965 to 1968.

Josephine DiLorenzo was raised in the Bronx. A highly gifted student, she graduated high school at 15 and entered Hunter College at 16 years of age. She got a job as one of the first female copyboys at the New York Daily News, working her way up to a reporter. Besides Daily News stories, DiLorenzo wrote celebrity interviews, including in-depth talks with Marilyn Monroe and Elizabeth Taylor. After becoming a stay-at-home Mom, DiLorenzo continued writing a weekly column for the Daily News titled “Trips and Treats.”

Following her graduation from Ursuline Highschool in the Bronx, Martin attended Boston College, graduating summa cum laude with a degree in Broadcast Communications and Theater. While at Boston College, she co-founded America's second oldest collegiate improv comedy troupe called My Mother's Fleabag which boasts a slew of celebrity alumni such as Amy Poehler.

== Career ==
=== Television ===
Martin has starred in hundreds of commercials, two of which she improvised that went on to win Clio Awards. She has also made more than forty recurring and guest star appearances in shows including How to Get Away with Murder, The Big Bang Theory, Code Black, American Princess, There's... Johnny!, Grace & Frankie, and The Office.

=== Film ===
Martin's film appearances include Soul Survivor, The Year of Spectacular Men, Four Christmases, Sleepover, and Blades of Glory. She is also best known on the Comic-Con trail for her work in Larry Blamire's Trail of the Screaming Forehead and The Lost Skeleton Returns Again.

=== Theater ===
Martin began her theater career in Boston, performing in America's longest running comedy, Shear Madness. In New York, Martin appeared Off-Broadway in original productions of works by Peter Tolan, David Ives and David Mamet. Martin made her Broadway debut opposite Nathan Lane in Neil Simon's Laughter on the 23rd Floor, later continuing with the national tour of the show. Martin is a member of The Echo Theater Company in Los Angeles, most recently performing the role of Soccer Mom in the company's 2019 LA Drama Critics Circle winning production of The Wolves.

=== Podcasts ===
Martin is currently co-host of the insidewink podcast along with Jean Trebek. Martin also produced and performed in The Audio Adventurebook of Big Dan Frater which won the Gold Nick Danger Mark Time award as best comedy album in 2015.

== Filmography ==
=== Film ===
Year	Title	Role	Notes
1986	Life Is a Banquet	Joanna Marson	TV movie
1993	The Perfect Woman	Herself	Short film
2004	Sleepover	Gabby's Friend	
2005	I'm Not Gay	Herself	Short film
2007	Blades of Glory	Female Judge in Stockholm	
2007	Trail of the Screaming Head	Millie Healey	
2008	Four Christmases	Churchgoer	
2008	The Lost Skeleton Returns Again	Chinfa, Queen of the Cantaloupe People	
2009	Dark and Stormy Night	Mrs. Cupcupboard	
2013	It's a Frame-Up!	Symona Boniface	Short film
2013	Favor	Pinback	
2013	Code Black	Judge Lily Taniston	
2014	A Zombie Next Door	Marge	Short film
2014	Audrey	Tootsie Palmer	
2017	The Year of Spectactular Men	Marg	
2020	RxR	Carol	Short film
2020	Soul Survivor	Karen	Short film
2022	Mind Thief	Norma	
2024	Tricks Can Go Wrong	Diane	
2024	Familiar Touch	Joan	
2024	Rock and Doris (try to) Write a Movie	Mrs. Dumont	
2026	Paul Ruins a Wedding	Aunt Barb	Short film

=== Television ===
Year	Title	Role	Notes
1987-1995	A Likely Story	Alison the Librarian	
1990	Wish You Were Here	Jean	Episode: "French Riviera"
1994-1996	Law & Order	Miss Dawkins/Dr. Florence Sanders	2 episodes
1995	Girls' Night Out	Herself	
1996	Party of Five	Woman	Episode: "Poor Substitutes"
1996	Grace Under Fire	Mrs. Strauman	Episode: "Positively Hateful"
1996	Townies	Mrs. Hammrick	Episode: "Faith, Hope, & Charity"
1997	7th Heaven	Teacher	Episode: "I Hate You"
1997-1998	Mad About You	Muriel	3 episodes
1998	The Naked Truth	Bonnie	Episode: "Day of the Locos"
1998	Cybill	Alison	Episode: "Don Gianni"
1998	Seinfeld	Lucy	Episode: "The Puerto Rican Day"
1998	Oh Baby	Nora	2 episodes
1998	The Practice	Mrs. Blair	Episode: "Rhyme and Reason"
1999	Katie Joplin	Lana	Episode: "Charcoaled Gray"
1999	Chicago Hope	Antonia Carver	Episode: "Upstairs, Downstairs"
1999	Maggie	Sharon	2 episodes
1999	Judging Amy	Mrs. Angela Compson	Episode: "Witch Hunt"
2000	Freaks and Geeks	Katey Desario	Episode: "Noshing and Moshing"
2002	Lizzie McGuire	Roberta Gordon	Episode: "Gordo's Bar Mitzvah"
2002	Providence	Episode: "Limbo"	
2002	Philly	Adele Foster	Episode: "Mojo Rising"
2002	NYPD Blue	Tess Barry	Episode: "Meat Me in the Park"
2003	Without a Trace	Mrs. Sawyer	Episode: "Sons and Daughters"
2005	Will & Grace	Gabby	Episode: "Sour Balls"
2005	Jack & Bobby	Herself	Episode: "A Child of God"
2005	ER	Mrs. Kendrick	Episode: "Dream House"
2007	Shark	Judge Rita Bardos	2 episodes
2007	Tales from the Pub	Jane Weldon/Caroline/Ruth Hammond	3 episodes
2009	Terminator: The Sarah Connor Chronicles	Molly Malloy	Episode: "Ourselves Alone"
2009	The Office	Herself	Episode: "Company Picnic"
2011	Desperate Housewives	Dr. Lippman	3 episodes
2011	Harry's Law	Elaine Lister	Episode: "Head Games"
2014	The Mentalist	Mrs. Macy	Episode: " II Tavolo Bianco"
2015	The Audio Adventurebook of Big Dan Frater, Vol. 1	Millie Healey	
2015	Mad Men	Viola	Episode: "Severance"
2015	The Exes	Dorothy	Episode: "Gone Girls"
2015-2017	Grace & Frankie	Judy	2 episodes
2016	JoJoHead	Herself	4 episodes
2017	The Young and the Restless	Linda	1 episode
2017	Hanazuki: Full of Treasures	Chicken Plant	4 episodes
2017	There's... Johnny!	Lorraine Klavin	3 episodes
2018	Code Black	Judge Lily Taniston	Episode: "The Business of Saving Lives"
2018	The Big Bang Theory	Andrea	Episode: "The Planetarium Collision"
2019	American Princess	Alma Quaid	2 episodes
2019	How to Get Away with Murder	Ms. Maloney	Episode: "I'm the Murderer"
2020	The Audio Adventurebook of Big Dan Fater, Vol. 2	Millie Healey	5 episodes
2021	PEN15	Sandra	Episode: "Bat Mitzvah"
2021-2022	General Hospital	Professor Kahn	4 episodes
2022	All Rise	Morgan Goodwin	Episode: "Truth Hurts"
2023	I Think You Should Leave with Tim Robinson	Cam	Episode: "When I First Thought of This You Didn't Even Have Hands Up There: You Were Just Walking Straight Up The Wall"
2026	Wylde Pak	Don/Fantasy Mom	Episode: "J-LAD/Big Honey"

=== Audio ===
Year	Title	Role	Notes
2015	Damn Dirty Geeks	Herself	Episode: "Funny Business with Big Dan Frater"
