= Andrew Parks =

American actor

- Years active: 1962–present
- Spouse: Katy Melody

Andrew Parks is an American film, television, and stage actor.

== Biography ==
Andrew Parks made his film debut at the age of 11, but did not return to acting for another eight years, beginning with The Strawberry Statement in 1970.

His feature film credits include W.C. Fields and Me (1976), The Mirror Has Two Faces (1996) and Donnie Brasco (1997). He is a key member of Larry Blamire's stock company, playing clueless alien Kro-Bar in The Lost Skeleton of Cadavra and its sequel The Lost Skeleton Returns Again, gullible scientist Dr. Philip Latham in Trail of the Screaming Forehead and monocled English dandy Lord Partfine in Dark and Stormy Night. Most recently, he mimicked Franklin Pangborn in the comedy short It's a Frame-Up!, the writing/directing debut of Blamire's producer Michael Schlesinger.

Parks' television credits include a recurring role on Angel and guest appearances on The Virginian, Room 222, Lucas Tanner, Cannon, Kojak, Barnaby Jones, Hart to Hart, M*A*S*H, Trapper John, M.D., Murder, She Wrote, The Trials of Rosie O'Neill, and Homicide: Life on the Street. He also voiced the role of Ben Day for the animated series These Are the Days. In 1971 Parks appeared as Jimmy Duff on "The Men From Shiloh" (rebranded name for The Virginian) in the episode titled "The Angus Killer."

Like his mother a long-time member of Theatre West, Los Angeles's oldest membership theatre company, Parks has appeared there in many plays, including Jim Beaver's Verdigris and a revival of Spoon River Anthology, which Theatre West originally developed in the 1960s with his mother in the cast. He also appears regularly at Pacific Resident Theatre in Venice, California, in plays such as Happy End and The Quick Change Room. On other stages, he has played Geoffrey in The Lion in Winter with Joan Fontaine, Ensign Pulver in Mister Roberts, and Tom in The Glass Menagerie.

Parks is married to Katy Melody. He is the brother of composer Garrett Parks.

== Filmography ==
- 1971 : The Virginian season 9 episode 18 (The Angus Killer) : Jimmy Duff
