= Yuri Bradac =

Slovenian actor and model

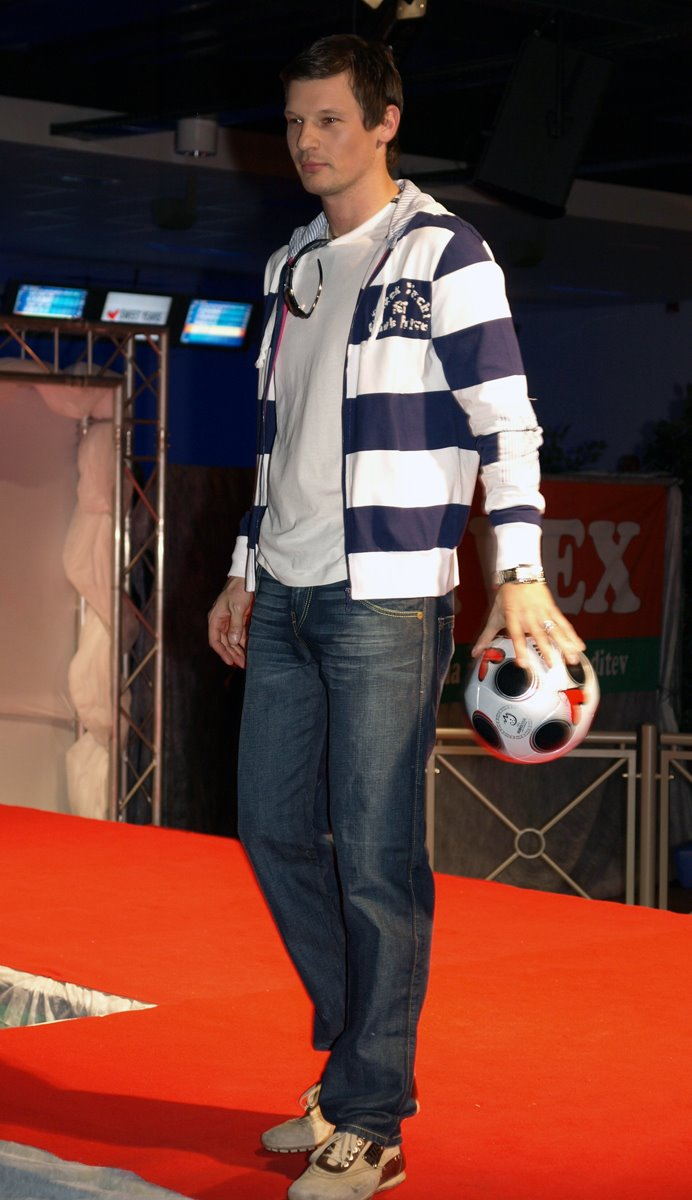
- Sweet Years opening in Maribor 2008
- Born: Jurij Bradač; June 29, 1973 (age 52); Maribor, Slovenia
- Citizenship: Slovenian
- Occupation(s): Actor, model
- Years active: 2005–present
- Parent: Nataša Ukmar

Jurij Bradač (born June 29, 1973 in Maribor), better known by his stage name Yuri Bradac, is a Slovenian actor and model.

== Career ==
His career began in television in the 2005 and has continued both in television and film since, including comedic, dramatic, and action roles. He is known for the role of Grigori in the Broken Angel and as Ivanoff in film Futbaal: The Price of Dreams. He has been working with such names as Lady Gaga, Enrique Iglesias, Jennifer Lopez, Timbaland and Lili Rocha, appearing in their respective music videos such as Bad Romance (Lady Gaga), Morning After Dark (Timbaland), On The Floor (Jennifer Lopez/Pitbull) and No Me Digas Que No (Enrique Iglesias).

== Actor ==
=== Filmography ===
Year	Film	Role
2007	Futbaal: The Price of Dreams	Ivanoff
2008	Broken Angel	Grigori
	TV series	Role
2006	Sex Games Vegas (episode: "Wireless")	Buck
	Short	Role
2005	46 minut	
2007	Mesage to Blind Flower	Marco
2008	The Last Appeal, St.Faustina: The Apostle of Divine Mercy	Fr. Sopocko
2008	The Last Appeal	Fr. Sopocko
2009	Rosecrans & Highland	Corrupt Cop
2010	Bocce	Rubio

=== Music videos ===
Year	Title	Artist(s)
2009	"Bad Romance"	Lady Gaga
2009	"Morning After Dark"	Timbaland (feat. Nelly Furtado & Soshy)
2010	"No Me Digas Que No"	Enrique Iglesias (feat. Wisin & Yandel)
2011	"On The Floor"	Jennifer Lopez (feat. Pitbull)
2011	"I Light a Candle for Our Love"	Lili Rocha
