= Larry Blamire =

American filmmaker, writer and artist

- Born: Massachusetts, U.S.
- Education: Art Institute of Boston
- Style: Illustrator, filmmaker

Larry Blamire is an American filmmaker, writer and artist best known for the independent film The Lost Skeleton of Cadavra.

== Biography ==
Blamire was raised in Massachusetts and studied illustration at the Art Institute of Boston.

=== Comic author ===
He dabbled briefly in underground comics, writing and drawing the Predator, a vigilante character, in Ace of Spades and Blazing Violence. After several years of various blue collar jobs, Blamire started working as a science fiction illustrator for Galileo, and later Aboriginal Science Fiction, among others.

=== Stage acting career ===
In the 1980s Blamire began acting on stage on a whim, landing roles at various Boston theatres; the Open Door Theatre, the Alley Theatre, as well as a season at the Boston Shakespeare Company. It was with the Open Door Theatre that he found a home, particularly in their outdoor summer productions at Jamaica Pond by the Pinebank Mansion in a natural formation known as the Kettlebowl. His first play, In the Nations, a dark western which he also directed, received critical and audience acclaim and was followed by his version of Robin Hood in which he played the title role but did not direct. It was later published by Bakers Plays, continuing to be performed worldwide. In 1984 he wrote and directed Interface, a science fiction thriller based on the alleged Philadelphia Experiment featuring ambitious effects and sound design. Performed indoors, it played well with audiences but, like Robin Hood, received a mixed reaction from the press.

=== Writing and directing movie career ===
In 1985, however, Blamire wrote and directed Jump Camp, a surreal dark comedy about a writer searching for a missing psychiatrist in a ghost town that took the quirky dialogue suggested by In the Nations and elevated it to heights of absurdity. The play was an instant hit with audiences and critics alike, ending up on the year's ten best lists in the Boston Globe, Boston Herald and Boston Phoenix. Moving outdoors again, Blamire's next play, Bride of the Mutant's Tomb, was a comedy about a hapless Ed Wood-inspired director trying to make his low-budget science fiction movie in the 1950s with a group of misfits. Despite less than complimentary reviews, it proved to be another crowd pleaser. In 1987 Blamire next wrote Whyo, a revenge tragedy about Irish gangs in 19th Century New York. It received a grant from the Massachusetts Council on the Arts and Humanities and an ambitious staged reading at Gloucester Stage Company. This led to Israel Horovitz commissioning a play, The Chroma Line, a partly autobiographical look at life in a wallpaper warehouse. His last play of the '80s was Ha'nt, a one-act performed as part of a horror anthology. During this period, Blamire received critical acclaim for a series of leading stage roles, including MacMurphy in One Flew Over the Cuckoo's Nest, Hotspur in Henry IV, Part 1, John Proctor in The Crucible, Tilden in Buried Child and Al in In the Boom Boom Room, for which he won The Boston Theatre Critics Circle Award for Best Actor. He also played the rapist in the Boston premiere of Extremities.

In the 1990s, despite revivals of In the Nations and Jump Camp (the latter at the Alliance Repertory Company in Los Angeles) and a lead role as the country DJ host in the hit show A Closer Walk with Patsy Cline at the Charles Playhouse, Blamire found himself moving away from theatre. In 1992 Blamire's comedy sketches were chosen for the HBO Writers Search, and he directed several at the Stella Adler Theatre in Los Angeles. They were also collected in an evening called Larry Blamire's Sketch-O-Rama by a new Massachusetts company, Theatre 9. Towards the end of the '90s, Blamire was writing more and more screenplays on spec, several of which were quarter- and semifinalists in the Academy of Motion Picture Arts and Sciences Nicholl Fellowship.

In 1997 Blamire began working with an internet start-up called Bali Hai Interactive, given carte blanche to develop new cutting edge entertainment. What resulted was The Wise Eye Guys, a quirky interactive nonlinear animated adventure for which he did thousands of drawings and directed the voice actors (which included his wife, actress Jennifer Blaire). Months after the company moved its offices to Los Angeles, it went under in the dot com crash of 2000. Trying unsuccessfully to raise money for the floundering Bali Hai, Blamire, having recently read about developments in digital video, got the idea of shooting an ultra-low-budget spoof of 1950s bargain basement science fiction movies, incorporating elements from Bride of the Mutant's Tomb. The resulting film, The Lost Skeleton of Cadavra, premiered at the Mill Valley Film Festival in 2002. Picked up by Michael Schlesinger for Sony, the film was released in 2004.

That same year, Blamire wrote and directed Johnny Slade's Greatest Hits (now Meet the Mobsters), produced by and starring John Fiore and some of The Sopranos cast. In 2005, he wrote and directed Trail of the Screaming Forehead. Though continuing the retro science fiction spoof theme, the film had a different look and feel, in widescreen and color, under the Ray Harryhausen Presents banner, with a title song composed by Blamire and sung by The Manhattan Transfer. After festival screenings, it was picked up by IFC, playing VOD in 2009, slated for DVD release in 2010. In 2007, Blamire formed a company, Bantam Street, with his core group of actors and technicians. Their acclaimed web series Tales From the Pub launched that same year. In 2008, Bantam Street made two films back-to-back; The Lost Skeleton Returns Again, a sequel to The Lost Skeleton of Cadavra, and Dark and Stormy Night, a stylistically authentic takeoff on 1930s "old dark house" movies. Both feature Bantam Street's ever-increasing pool of veteran character actors, including Betty Garrett, H.M. Wynant and James Karen.

=== Writing career ===
In 2009, Blamire published two books; Tales of the Callamo Mountains, a collection of his western horror short stories, and I Didn't Know You Came With Raisins, a collection of his surreal cartoons. He also completed a screenplay of Steam Wars, an ambitious longtime project with copious illustrations. Blamire continues to keep his hand in graphics, working in both Photoshop and acrylic paint. His paintings tend toward surrealism.

Blamire has contributed writing and art to a number of the They Came From...! TTRPG books, including They Came from Beneath the Sea!, They Came from [CLASSIFIED]! and They Came from the Cyclops's Cave!

== Personal life ==
Blamire is the nephew of British actor Bert Edgar. Blamire has two sons—Cory, by his first marriage and Griffin, by wife Jennifer Blaire, whom he married in 1998.

== Releases ==
- The Lost Skeleton of Cadavra was released on DVD by Sony Pictures Home Entertainment on June 22, 2004.
- Meet the Mobsters was released on DVD by Salient Media on May 20, 2008.
- Shout! Factory released both Dark and Stormy Night and The Lost Skeleton Returns Again on DVD on August 17, 2010. A free DVD of Tales from the Pub was given to those who preordered the DVDs on Shout! Factory's website.
- Trail of the Screaming Forehead was released on DVD in the United Kingdom by 4 Digital on June 20, 2011.
