= Betty Garrett =

American actress, comedian, singer and dancer (1919–2011)

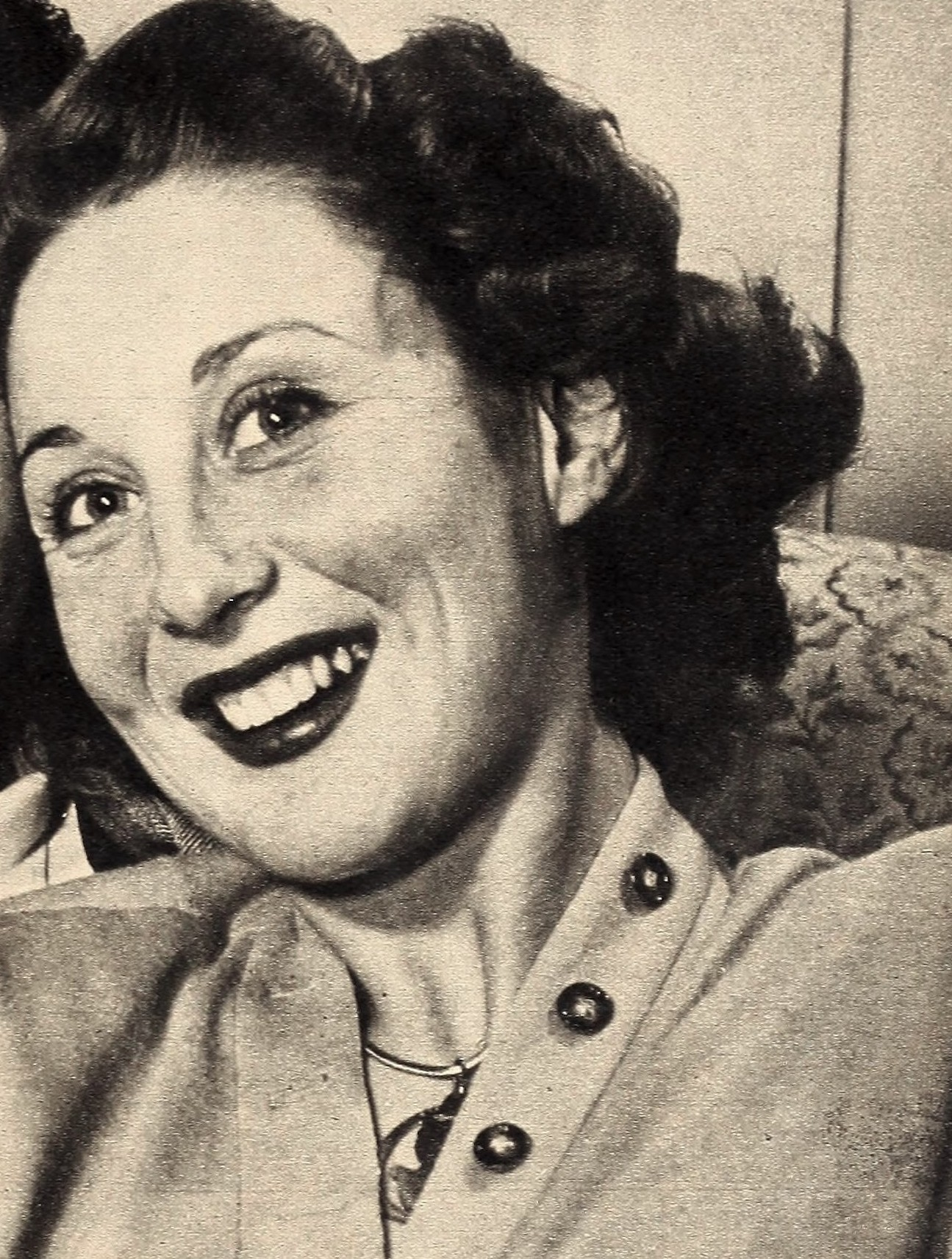
- Garrett in 1950
- Born: May 23, 1919; St. Joseph, Missouri, U.S.
- Died: February 12, 2011 (aged 91); Los Angeles, California, U.S.
- Education: Annie Wright School; Neighborhood Playhouse
- Occupations: Actress; comedian; dancer; singer
- Years active: 1938–2011
- Television: All in the Family, Laverne & Shirley
- Spouse: Larry Parks (m. 1944; died 1975)
- Children: 2, including Andrew Parks

Elizabeth Garrett Parks (May 23, 1919 – February 12, 2011) was an American actress, comedian, singer and dancer. She originally performed on Broadway, and was then signed to a film contract with Metro-Goldwyn-Mayer. She appeared in several musical films, then returned to Broadway and made guest appearances on several television series.

Garrett later became known for the roles she played in two prominent 1970s sitcoms: Archie Bunker's politically liberal neighbor Irene Lorenzo in All in the Family and landlady Edna Babish in Laverne & Shirley. In later years, she appeared in television series such as The Golden Girls, Grey's Anatomy, Boston Public and Becker as well as in several Broadway plays and revivals.

== Early life ==
Garrett was born in Saint Joseph, Missouri, the daughter of Elizabeth Octavia (née Stone) and Curtis Garrett. Shortly after her birth, her parents relocated to Seattle, Washington, where her mother managed the sheet music department at Sherman Clay, and her father worked as a traveling salesman. His alcoholism and fiscal irresponsibility eventually led to their divorce, and Garrett and her mother lived in a series of residential hotels in order to minimize expenses.

When Garrett was eight years old, her mother married the fiancé she had jilted in order to marry Curtis. They settled in Regina, Saskatchewan, where her new stepfather worked in the meat-packing industry. A year later, her mother discovered that her new husband was involved in a sexual relationship with his male assistant, so she and Betty returned to Seattle. After graduating from public grammar school, Garrett enrolled at the Annie Wright School in Tacoma, which she attended on a full scholarship. The school had no drama department, so she frequently organized musical productions and plays for special occasions. Following her senior year performance in Twelfth Night, the bishop urged her to pursue a career on the stage. At the same time, her mother's friend arranged an interview with Martha Graham, who was in Seattle for a concert tour, and the dancer recommended her for a scholarship at the Neighborhood Playhouse in New York City.

Garrett and her mother arrived in Manhattan in the summer of 1936 and Garrett began classes in September. Her teachers included Graham and Anna Sokolow for dance, Sandy Meisner for drama, Lehman Engel for music, and Margaret Webster for the Shakespearean classics, and fellow students included Daniel Mann and Richard Conte. She felt she was destined to be a dramatic actress and shied away from playing comedic roles.

== Early career ==
During the summer months, Garrett performed in the Borscht Belt, where she had the opportunity to work with Danny Kaye, Jerome Robbins, Carol Channing, Imogene Coca, and Jules Munshin, and she was encouraged to hone her singing and dancing skills. She joined Orson Welles' Mercury Theatre as an understudy in what was to be its last stage presentation, a poorly-reviewed and short-lived production of Danton's Death that gave her the opportunity to work with Joseph Cotten, Ruth Ford, Martin Gabel, and Arlene Francis. She performed with Martha Graham's dance company at Carnegie Hall and the Alvin Theatre, sang at the Village Vanguard, and appeared in satirical and political revues staged by the Brooklyn-based Flatbush Arts Theatre, which eventually changed its name to the American Youth Theatre and relocated to Manhattan. During this period she joined the Communist Party and began performing at fundraisers for progressive causes.

=== Broadway ===
Garrett made her Broadway debut in 1942 in the revue Of V We Sing, which closed after 76 performances but led to her being cast in the Harold Rome revue Let Freedom Sing later that year. It closed after only eight performances, but producer Mike Todd saw it and signed her to understudy Ethel Merman and play a small role in the 1943 Cole Porter musical Something for the Boys. Merman became ill during the run, allowing Garrett to play the lead for a week. During this time, she was seen by producer Vinton Freedley, who cast her in Jackpot, a Vernon Duke/Howard Dietz musical starring Nanette Fabray and Allan Jones. The show closed quickly, and Garrett began touring the country with her nightclub act.

=== Metro-Goldwyn-Mayer ===
After appearing on Broadway in Laffing Room Only, which closed there, Garrett traveled with the show as it played extended runs in Detroit and Chicago. After this, she returned to New York and was cast in Call Me Mister, which reunited her with Harold Rome, Lehman Engel, and Jules Munshin. She won critical acclaim and the Donaldson Award for her performance, which prompted Al Hirschfeld to caricature her in The New York Times. It led to her being signed to a one-year contract with Metro-Goldwyn-Mayer by Louis B. Mayer. Garrett arrived at the studio in January 1947 and made her film debut portraying nightclub performer Shoo Shoo O'Grady in Big City, directed by Norman Taurog and co-starring George Murphy and Robert Preston. Mayer renewed her contract and she appeared in the musicals Words and Music, On the Town, Take Me Out To The Ball Game, and Neptune's Daughter in quick succession.

The Jolson Story had been a huge hit in the United Kingdom, so Garrett and her husband Larry Parks decided to capitalize on its popularity by appearing at the London Palladium and then touring the U.K. with their nightclub act. Its success prompted them to return to the country three times but the increasing popularity of television eventually led to the decline of music hall entertainment. Garrett then was cast opposite Janet Leigh and Jack Lemmon in My Sister Eileen, a 1955 musical remake of a 1940 theatrical adaptation of stories by Ruth McKenney. Garrett got the part when Judy Holliday dropped out of the project due to a contract dispute. The following year, she and Parks replaced Holliday and Sydney Chaplin in the Broadway production of Bells Are Ringing during their vacation from the show. Over the next two decades. she worked sporadically, appearing on Broadway in two short-lived plays (Beg, Borrow or Steal with Parks and A Girl Could Get Lucky with Pat Hingle) and a musical adaptation of Spoon River Anthology, and making guest appearances on The Dinah Shore Chevy Show, The Lloyd Bridges Show, and The Fugitive.

== Later career ==
In the fall of 1973, All in the Family added two new people to the neighborhood, Frank Lorenzo and his feisty Irish-American wife Irene. Lear had been the publicity man for Call Me Mister, All in the Family writers Bernard West and Mickey West knew Garrett from her time with the American Youth Theatre, and Jean Stapleton had been in the cast of Bells Are Ringing, so Garrett appeared to be a front runner for the role of Irene. It went instead to Sada Thompson, but Thompson, unhappy after taping one episode, asked to be released from her commitment, freeing the role for Garrett. Irene was Catholic—a source of annoyance for Protestant Archie—and assumed many of the handyman household duties normally associated with husbands, and she therefore presented a kind of nemesis to Archie Bunker. She later worked with Archie at his place of employment, driving a forklift, and was paid less than the man she replaced (but more than Archie). Garrett remained with the series from 1973 through 1975. She won the 1974 Golden Globe for her performance on the series.

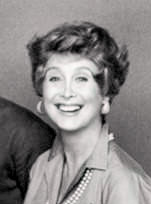
Betty Garrett in 1976

The following year, Garrett was performing her one-woman show Betty Garrett and Other Songs in Westwood, California when she was offered the role of landlady Edna Babish in Laverne & Shirley. The character was a five-time divorcée who eventually married Laverne's father Frank. Although Garrett reportedly felt she never was given enough to do on the show, she appreciated the fact that her musical talents occasionally were incorporated into the plot. In 1981, when the series was extended beyond what had been intended to be its final season, Garrett was forced to drop out because she had committed to performing with Sandy Dennis, Jack Gilford, Hope Lange, and Joyce Van Patten in The Supporting Cast on Broadway. The play closed after only eight performances, but returning to Laverne & Shirley was not an option as the writers had explained Edna's disappearance by having her divorce Frank, although this was not directly addressed until the series' final season.

In the ensuing years, Garrett appeared on television in Murder, She Wrote, The Golden Girls, Harts of the West, Union Square, Boston Public, Becker (for which she was nominated for the Emmy Award for Outstanding Guest Actress in a Comedy Series), and Grey's Anatomy, and on stage in Plaza Suite (with Parks), And Miss Reardon Drinks A Little, Meet Me in St. Louis as Katie, the feisty Irish maid, and the 2001 Broadway revival of Follies, receiving excellent notices for singing "Broadway Baby." At Theatre West, which she co-founded, she directed Arthur Miller's The Price and appeared in the play Waiting in the Wings. She won the Los Angeles Drama Critics Circle Award twice, for Spoon River Anthology and Betty Garrett and Other Songs.

Garrett received a star on the Hollywood Walk of Fame in 2003. On the occasion of her 90th birthday in 2009, she was honored at a celebration sponsored by Theatre West at the Music Box Theatre in Hollywood.

In 2010, Garrett appeared alongside former two-time co-star Esther Williams during Turner Classic Movies' first annual Classic Film Festival. Their film Neptune's Daughter was screened at the pool of the Roosevelt Hotel in Hollywood, California, while a Williams-inspired synchronised swimming troupe, The Aqualilies, performed.

== Awards and nominations ==
Golden Globes

- 1974: Won for Best Supporting Actress for the role of Irene Lorenzo in the television series All in the Family.

Primetime Emmy Awards

- 2003: Nominated for Outstanding Guest Actress in a Comedy Series for the role of Molly Firth in the CBS sitcom Becker.

Ovation Awards

- 2009: Nominated for Lead Actress in a Play for the role of Sarita Myrtle in the Theatre West production of Waiting in the Wings

== Personal life ==
While appearing in Los Angeles, Garrett was invited to perform a comedy sketch at the Actor's Lab in Hollywood. It was there where she met Larry Parks, who was producing the show. He invited her to join him for a drink, then drove her to the top of Mulholland Drive and told her "You're the girl I'm going to marry." During the next two weeks, the two were inseparable. Garrett departed for a nightclub engagement in Chicago. Eventually Parks joined her and introduced her to his mother, who lived in nearby Joliet, Illinois. Parks returned to Los Angeles to begin filming Counter-Attack, and Garrett traveled to New York to prepare for Laffing Room Only with Olsen and Johnson, but before rehearsals began, she called Parks and proposed marriage. The two were wed on September 8, 1944, four months after their initial meeting. Actor Lloyd Bridges served as best man. Garrett and Parks spent a month honeymooning in Malibu Beach, and they then lived apart for the next two years while pursuing their careers.

Garrett and Parks remained married until his death in 1975. They had two sons, composer Garrett Parks and actor Andrew Parks. Betty Garrett had one granddaughter, Madison Claire Parks, by her son Garrett Parks, and daughter-in-law, Broadway actress Karen Culliver.

== Blacklisting ==
Because of their past affiliations with the Communist Party, Garrett and Parks became embroiled with the House Un-American Activities Committee, although only Parks was forced to testify. He willingly admitted that he had been a member of the party and initially refused to name others, but he later did so. Despite that, he found himself on the Hollywood blacklist. Garrett also had trouble finding work but, as the mother of two young sons, she did not mind being unemployed as much as her husband did. Parks formed a highly successful construction business, and eventually the couple owned many apartment buildings scattered throughout the Los Angeles metropolitan area. Rather than sell them upon completion, Parks decided to retain ownership and collect rents as a landlord, a decision that proved to be extremely profitable. During that period, the couple occasionally performed in Las Vegas showrooms, summer stock productions, and touring companies of Broadway shows.

== Death ==
Garrett died of an aortic aneurysm in Los Angeles, on February 12, 2011, at the age of 91. Her body was cremated.

== Filmography ==
=== Features ===
Year	Title	Role	Notes
1948	Big City	Shoo Shoo Grady	
1948	Words and Music	Peggy Lorgan McNeil	
1949	Take Me Out to the Ball Game	Shirley Delwyn	
1949	Neptune's Daughter	Betty Barrett	
1949	On the Town	Brunhilde "Hildy" Esterhazy	
1949	Some of the Best		Short subject
1955	My Sister Eileen	Ruth Sherwood	
1957	The Shadow on the Window	Linda Atlas	
2003	Broadway: The Golden Age, by the Legends Who Were There	Herself	Documentary
2007	Trail of the Screaming Forehead	Mrs. Cuttle	
2009	Dark and Stormy Night	Mrs. Hausenstout	Final film role
2011	Troupers	Herself	Documentary
2012	Carol Channing: Larger Than Life	Herself	Documentary, posthumous released

=== Television work ===
Year	Title	Role	Notes
1955	Ford Theatre	Lorry Erskine	Episode: "A Smattering of Bliss"
1957	Ford Theatre	Georgia Penland	Episode:"The Penlands and the Poodle"
1961	The Dinah Shore Chevy Show	Bettina	Episode: "Autumn Crocus"
1962	The Lloyd Bridges Show	Ellen Pennington	Episode: "Mr. Pennington's Machine"
1964	The Fugitive	Margaret Ruskin	Episode: "Escape into Black"
1973-1975	All in the Family	Irene Lorenzo	24 episodes
1975	Great Performances	Mary Hallen	Episode: "Who's Happy Now?"
1976-1981	Laverne & Shirley	Edna Babish DeFazio	97 episodes
1978	The Love Boat	Martha McCoy	Episode: "Rocky/Julie's Dilemma/Who's Who?"
1981	All the Way Home	Catherine	TV movie
1982	Mr. Merlin	Elizabeth Rogers	2 episodes
1986	Blacke's Magic	Grace	Episode: "Wax Poetic"
1987	Murder, She Wrote	Martha Nielson	Episode: "Trouble in Paradise"
1991	Murder, She Wrote	Kit Parkins	Episode: "Who Killed J.B. Fletcher?"
1992	The Golden Girls	Sarah	Episode: "Old Boyfriends"
1994	Harts of the West	Thelma	Episode: "Ghost Run"
1994	The Good Life	Phyllis	Episode: "The Mother-in-law"
1996	Townies	Mrs. Gunders	Episode: "Faith, Hope & Charity"
1998	The Long Way Home	Veronica	TV movie
1998	Union Square	Agnes	Episode: "Out and in"
2003	Becker	Mrs. Firth	Episode: "Nightmare On Becker Street"
2003	Boston Public	Miriam Guber	Episode: "Chapter Fifty-Seve"
2006	Grey's Anatomy	Eleanor	Episode: Break on Through

== Stage work ==
- Danton's Death (1938)
- Railroads on Parade (1939)
- You Can't Sleep Here (1940)
- A Piece of Our Mind (1940)
- All in Fun (1941)
- Meet the People (1941)
- Of V We Sing (1942)
- Let Freedom Sing (1942)
- Something for the Boys (1943)
- Jackpot (1944)
- Laffing Room Only (1944)
- Call Me Mister (1946)
- The Anonymous Lover (1952)
- Bells Are Ringing (1958) (two-week replacement for Judy Holliday)
- Beg, Borrow or Steal (1960)
- Spoon River Anthology (1963)
- A Girl Could Get Lucky (1964)
- The Tiger/The Typists (1965)
- Plaza Suite (1968)
- Who's Happy Now? (1968)
- Call Me Mister (1969)
- Something for the Boys (1969)
- And Miss Reardon Drinks a Little (1972)
- Betty Garrett and Other Songs (1974)
- The Supporting Cast (1981)
- Breaking Up the Act (1982)
- Quilters (1984)
- Meet Me in St. Louis (1989)
- A High-Time Salute to Martin and Blane (1991)
- Tom-Tom on a Rooftop (1997)
- Arsenic and Old Lace (1998)
- Happy Lot! (1998)
- Tallulah & Tennessee (1999)
- Follies (2001)
- Follies (2004)
- Nunsense (2005)
- My One and Only (2006)
- Morning's at Seven (2007)
