= H. M. Wynant =

American film and television actor (born 1927)

H.M. Wynant
- Born: Chaim Weiner; February 12, 1927 (age 99); Detroit, Michigan, U.S.
- Occupation: Actor
- Years active: 1955–present
- Spouse(s): Ethel Winant (m. 1951-1971) (divorced) (3 children); Paula Davis (m. 1993-present) (1 child)

H. M. Wynant (born Chaim Weiner; 1926 or 1927) is an American film and television actor.

== Life and career ==
Wynant was born in Detroit, Michigan to Bessie and Jacob Weiner from Zabłotów, Poland (present-day Zabolotiv, Ukraine). He made his feature film debut as a Native American in Samuel Fuller's Run of the Arrow (1957). The following year Wynant played Yellow Bull, a Sioux Indian, in the Walt Disney film Tonka.

His film credits include Run Silent, Run Deep (1958); The Slender Thread (1965); Track of Thunder (1967); The Helicopter Spies (1968); Marlowe (1969); Conquest of the Planet of the Apes (1972); The Horror at 37,000 Feet (1973); Hangar 18 (1980); Earthbound (1981); and Solar Crisis (1990). He played a villain who fought Elvis Presley in the 1963 film, It Happened at the World's Fair.

Among his many television credits are appearances on shows such as Playhouse 90; Sugarfoot; Hawaiian Eye; Combat!; The Wild Wild West; Perry Mason (10 appearances); The Twilight Zone; Daniel Boone; Gunsmoke (8 appearances); Frontier Circus; Get Smart; Hawaii Five-O; The Big Valley; Hogan's Heroes; Bat Masterson; Mission: Impossible; Quincy, M.E.; and Dallas.

== Partial filmography ==
- Alfred Hitchcock Presents (1956) (Season 2 Episode 3: "De Mortuis") - Truck Driver (credited as Haim Winant)
- Sweet Smell of Success (1957) - Patron at Toots Shor's (uncredited)
- Run of the Arrow (1957) - Crazy Wolf
- Decision at Sundown (1957) - Spanish
- Oregon Passage (1957) - Black Eagle
- Run Silent, Run Deep (1958) - Corpsman Hendrix (uncredited)
- Tonka (1958) - Yellow Bull
- Mike Hammer (1958) Episode "Stay Out Of Town" as gunman.
- It Happened at the World's Fair (1963) - Vince Bradley
- The Wheeler Dealers (1963) - Bo Bluedog (uncredited)
- The Slender Thread (1965) - Doctor Morris
- Get Smart (1967) (Season 2 Episode 27: "Pussycats Galore") - Frank Valentine
- Track of Thunder (1967) - Maxwell Carstairs
- The Search for the Evil One (1967)
- Sail to Glory (1967) - Captain Dick Brown
- The Helicopter Spies (1968) - The Aksoy Brothers (archive footage)
- The Virginian (1968) (Season 7 Episode 5: "The Wind of Outrage") - Sturdevant
- Marlowe (1969) - Sonny Steelgrave
- Conquest of the Planet of the Apes (1972) - Hoskyns
- The Horror at 37,000 Feet (1973, TV Movie) - Frank Driscoll
- The Rockford Files (1975) (Season 2 Episode 2: "The Farnsworth Stratagem") - Danzi
- The Last Tycoon (1976) - Man at Dailies (uncredited)
- Grand Jury (1976) - Mr. Potter
- Hangar 18 (1980) - Flight Director
- Earthbound (1981) - Dave
- Solar Crisis (1990) - IXL executive #1
- The Big Empty (1997) - J.W. McCreedy
- Whigmaleerie (2005) - Hector MacDougall
- Trail of the Screaming Forehead (2007) - Dr. Applethorpe
- The Lost Skeleton Returns Again (2008) - General Scottmanson
- Dark and Stormy Night (2009) - Dr. Van Von Vandervon
- Yesterday Was a Lie (2009) - Art Patron
- Footprints (2011) - Victor
- Marafon (2013) - David
- The Adventures of Biffle and Shooster (2015) - 'Montague Shaw' as Andrew
- Living Room Coffin (2018) - Terry
