= Dark and stormy =

Dark and stormy may refer to:

- Dark 'n' stormy, the alcoholic drink
- It was a dark and stormy night, the English literary phrase
- "Dark and Stormy", a song by Hot Chip

== See also ==
- Dark and Stormy Night, a 2009 independent film
