= Fay Masterson =

British actress

- Born: 15 April 1974 (age 51); Kent, England, UK
- Occupation: Actress
- Years active: 1988–present

Fay Masterson (born 15 April 1974) is a British actress. She is best known for her roles as Head Girl in The New Adventures of Pippi Longstocking, Andrea Garnett in The Last Ship, and as Gail Jones in Fifty Shades Darker and Fifty Shades Freed.

== Career ==
Masterson's performance career began as a dancer which she gave up at age 11 after being cast in The New Adventures of Pippi Longstocking. Masterson started her acting career as a child actress at age 14 with her first appearance as Head Girl in "The New Adventures of Pippi Longstocking", a fantasy-adventure, musical, family film based on the books by the late Astrid Lindgren. Fay originally auditioned for the role of Pippi Longstocking, but the role went to her former co-star Tami Erin. Ken Annakin liked her so much that he wrote the part of the head girl at the children's home just for her. Since then she has appeared in over twenty-five films and over thirty-five television productions. She has additionally voiced characters in several video games.

In 1986 she was interviewed by a stand-in presenter Kenneth Williams on the British tv show Wogan.

These roles include guest appearances on the television series Jupiter Moon (1990 and 1996), Casualty (1993), Game On (1996) and The Ruth Rendell Mysteries (1991).

She has appeared in American films including The Power of One (1992), The Man Without a Face (1993) and A Christmas Carol (2009). She also was in the role of ship's Chief Engineer, LCDR Andrea Garnett, on TNT's The Last Ship.

== Filmography ==
=== Film ===
Year	Title	Role	Notes
1988	The New Adventures of Pippi Longstocking	Head Girl	
1988	Billy's Christmas Angels	Hope	
1992	The Power of One	Maria Elisabet Marais	
1993	The Man Without a Face	Gloria Norstadt	
1994	Jock of the Bushveld	Lilian Cubitt	
1994	Cops & Robbersons	Cindy Robberson	
1995	The Quick and the Dead	Mattie Silk	
1995	Avenging Angel	Miranda Young	
1995	Paparazzo	Sadie Prince	
1997	Forbidden Territory: Stanley's Search for Livingstone	Alice Pike	
1999	Eyes Wide Shut	Sally	
1999	The Manor	Dolly	
1999	A Touch of Hope	Rochelle Kraft	
1999	The Apartment Complex	Alice	
2000	We Married Margo	Take Out Girl One	
2000	Quantum Project	Mia	Short film
2000	Sorted	Tiffany	
2001	Venus and Mars	Celeste	
2001	Brightness	Carla	Short film
2001	The Lost Skeleton of Cadavra	Betty Armstrong	
2001	Drive, She Said	Her	Short film
2002	Johnson County War	Clara Jager	
2003	The Lone Ranger	Grace Hartman	
2004	Rancid	Monica Klein	
2004	Paparazzi	Marcy	
2004	Happily Even After	Elizabeth	
2006	Sam's Lake	Sam	
2007	Her Best Move	Lori	
2007	Trail of the Screaming Forehead	Dr. Sheila Bexter	
2008	Broken Angel	Mimi	
2008	Visioneers	Cindy	
2008	The Lost Skeleton Returns Again	Betty Armstrong	
2009	The Crooked Eye	Sharon	Short film
2009	Dark and Stormy Night	Sabasha Fanmoore	
2009	A Christmas Carol	Martha Cratchit / Guest #1 / Caroline (Voices)	Animated film
2010	Amish Grace	Jill Green	
2016	A Boy Called Po	Valerie	
2016	The Maid	Colleen	
2017	Fifty Shades Darker	Gail Jones	
2018	Fifty Shades Freed	Gail Jones-Taylor	
2018	Vice	Edna Vincent	
2019	Wish Man	Lorraine	

=== Television ===
Year	Title	Role	Notes
1990	Press Gang	Claire Pearson	Episode: The Week and Pizza
1990–1996	Jupiter Moon	Gabriella Tanzi	13 episodes
1991	The Ruth Rendell Mysteries	Saffron	Episode: Means of Evil
1993	Casualty	Amy Croft	Episode: Child's Play
1993	Highlander: The Series	Jenny Harris	Episode: The Beast Below
1996	Game On	Susie	Episode: Bruce Willis & Robert De Niro Holding A Fish
1996	Strangers	Clarice	Episode: Touch
1997	Soldier of Fortune, Inc.	Allison Trout	Episode: Collateral Damage
1999	Mercy Point	Joanne Collinswood	Episode: No Mercy
2001	Judging Amy	Miss Weldon	Episode: Off the Grid
2001	UC: Undercover	Veronica	Episode: Honor Among Thieves
2002	The Agency	Jennifer	Episode: Son Set
2002	Johnson County War	Clara Jager	TV miniseries
2003	Peacemakers	Debra Wannamaker	Episode: Pilot
2003	Monk	Diane Luden	Episode: Mr. Monk Meets the Playboy
2003	Miss Match	Gabby Thompson	Episode: Who's Your Daddy?
2004	Without a Trace	Melinda Guthrie	Episode: Exposure
2005	Carnivàle	Waitress	Episode: Ingram, TX
2005	Medium	Female Passenger	Episode: Being Mrs.O'Leary's Cow
2005	Close to Home	Jodie Ericson	Episode 6 : Parents on Trial
2005–2006	The Inside	Karen Ryan	2 episodes: Thief of Hearts and Aidan
2006	Ghost Whisperer	Vera	Episode: Miss Fortune
2007	Cane	Marley	3 episodes: The Two Alex Vegas, Brotherhood, and One Man Is an Island
2007	Life	Amy Dujardin	Episode: Dig a Hole
2007	Saving Grace	Sister Finnian	Episode: Is There a Scarlet Letter on My Breast?
2008	Emily's Reasons Why Not	Vinessa	Episode: Why Not to Date a Twin
2008	The Starter Wife	Katrina Jane Vanderbrook	2 episodes: Her Old Man & The Sea and Woman Over the Influence
2009	Big Love	Sandy	Episode: On Trial
2009	The Mentalist	Melinda Batson	Episode: The Scarlet Letter
2010	Bones	Grace Bryson	Episode: The Dentist in the Ditch
2010	CSI: Miami	Laura Williams	Episode: Mommie Deadest
2010	Sex and the Austen Girl	Jane Mansfield	8 episodes
2011	Lie to Me*	Gina Dobar	Episode: Funhouse
2011	NCIS	Angela Simms (uncredited)	Episode: Thirst
2013	NCIS	Gloria Hebner	Episode: Oil & Water
2014–2018	The Last Ship	Commander Andrea Garnett	31 episodes

=== Video games ===
Year	Title	Role	Notes
2007	Blazing Angels 2: Secret Missions of WWII	Emily Ruston	voice
2009	Dragon Age: Origins	Kaitlyn / Oriana Cousland / Panowen / Additional Voices	voice
2009	Legendary	Vivian	voice
2011	Gears of War 3	Warehouse Woman #2	voice
2011	Star Wars: The Old Republic	Agent Feyenn / Agent Ryleah / Darth Synar / Emma Thex / Lieutenant Mallohe	voice
2012	Mass Effect 3: Leviathan	Dr. Ann Bryson	voice
