= Ajla Hodžić =

Bosnian actress (born 1980)

Ajla Hodžić (born 25 January 1980 in Sarajevo, Yugoslavia, presently in Bosnia and Herzegovina) is a Bosnian actress.

== Biography ==
Hodžić appeared in a variety of film and television projects in her home country. Currently working and residing in Los Angeles, she is a graduate of Wellesley College. She speaks Bosnian, English, Spanish, Italian and Turkish.

== Film ==
- Don't Look Up (feature) - Chavi
- Broken Angel (feature) - Asli
- Walk Hard (feature) - Pierced Lip Girl
- Laura (short feature) - Laura
