= Aclan Bates =

American film director

AKA Aclan Büyüktürkoğlu
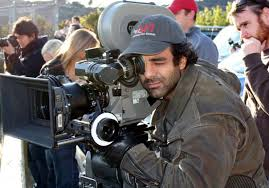
- Born: June 25, 1966 (age 60); Ankara
- Occupations: theater and film actor, director

AKA Aclan Büyüktürkoğlu (born 25 June 1966, Ankara) is a Turkish/American theater and film actor and director.

He was born on June 25, 1966 in Ankara. He completed his undergraduate education at Hacettepe University, Ankara State Conservatory Theater Department between 1987 and 1991. In 1991, he was appointed to the Trabzon State Theater and was accepted as a State Theater actor. While continuing his career as an actor, he completed his first master's degree on theater directing and acting education at Hacettepe University Ankara State Conservatory Theater Department. He gave his thesis by staging Bertolt Brecht's play "The Good Person of Szechwan".

He completed his second master's degree at Ankara University, Faculty of Educational Sciences, Department of Fine Arts Education. He gave his thesis on "Problems of Training Actor in Theater Education Schools".

Meanwhile, he participated in the Denizli International Theater Festival by staging Jean Paul Sartre's "Flies" at TOBAV Art Education Center. He settled in America to get closer to the art of cinema, which he was interested in as well as theater. He was accepted to the American Film Institute Film Directing Department with the short film he shot in America called "Relief". In the USA, "Versus", "The Revelation of T.H. Carlson", "The Hunt", "Ashes to Flames", the short film "Cesar Chavez" and shot documentaries.

He completed his third master's degree by giving his thesis with the film "Condemned", which he shot for the American Film Institute. In the same year, he won the first prize at the Ankara International Film Festival with the film "Condemned". He directed many documentaries and commercials. He shot a documentary about the state of California and the life of Cesar Chavez.

In 2003, he returned to the State Theaters with the musical play "Animal Farm", which he directed at the Trabzon State Theatre, and he translated and directed many plays one after the other. He introduced the highly acclaimed plays of American theater to the Turkish theater audience. Kafka's play "The Trial", which he directed for Write Act Repertory Theater in Los Angeles, was awarded the Stage Alliance award. He staged Norman Barasch's "Standing By" at the Matrix Theater and the work received great acclaim. He resigned from the State Theaters in 2004 and continued his work in Los Angeles.

He acted as an actor in the works "Lincoln Lights" for the ABC television series, "A Taxi to Jennah" for the Fountain Theater, and "Josephine" for the Stage 52 theater. He voiced in the movie "Pirates of the Caribbean 3". He directed Kafka's The Trial for Write Act Repertory Theater and was nominated for a Los Angeles Stage Alliance award. In addition to his film work, he gave cinema and theater acting lessons at the acting studio Acting Clan in Los Angeles.

He directed the first Turkish film, Meleğin Sırları, shot entirely in Hollywood.

He teaches cinema acting and screenwriting at the Filmstar Performing Arts Center, which he founded in Ankara, Turkey, and continues his theater and film work as a director.

In 2015, he directed and starred in the movie Antikacı, for which he also wrote the script. He is a working actor/director at the Turkish State Theatres.

== Stage and Film work ==
=== Director/Actor ===
- 2025 Directed Adolph Green and Betty Comden's Singin' in the Rain for the Turkish State Opera and Ballet
- 2023 Directed Richard Nash's The Rainmaker for the Turkish State Theatres, Ankara
- 2022 Directed Abdullah Öztürk's Holden's Cinderellas for the Turkish State Theatres, Ankara
- 2019 Directed Sarah Ruhl's The Clean House for the Turkish State Theatres, Ankara
- 2015 Directed the feature-length film Antikaci
- 2014 Directed Anton Chekhov's The Swan Song /A Marriage Proposal for the Turkish State Theatres, Ankara
- 2013 Performed in Unutma Beni as Cevher
- 2012 Performed in Taken 2
- 2012 Directed Paolo Levi’s Pinedus Affair
- 2011 Directed Jeanne Beckwith’s “A War Story at the Realto”
- 2010 Directed Beth Henley’s ‘’Crimes of the Heart’’
- 2009 Performed in Mark Sickman’s A Taxi to Jannah
- 2009 Josephine, Studio 52 as "Pepito" and "Juan Perón" Los Angeles
- 2008 Directed Melegin Sırları (Broken Angel) and performed as "Hakan"
- 2008 Lincoln Heights "lead" Los Angeles
- 2007 Directed Norman Barasch’s Standing By at the Matrix Theatre, Los Angeles
- 2006 Agır Roman (East Side Story), Istanbul National Ballet, Los Angeles Production at the Ford Amphitheatre, Production Supervisor
- 2005 Directed The Trial for Write Act Repertory Theatre: Los Angeles
- 2004 Produced and Directed Cesar Chavez Documentary
- 2004 Directed George Orwell's Animal Farm
- 2000–02 American Film Institute Hollywood, California Writer/Director
- 1991–2009 Turkish National Theatre, Ankara, Turkey

=== Actor/Director ===
- 1998–99 Jules Feiffer's Little Murders as "Kenny"
- 1996–98 Luigi Pirandello's Liola as "Liola"
- 1997–98 Directed Jean-Paul Sartre's The Flies
- 1996–98 David Hare's Skylight as "Edward"
- 1995–97 Anton Chekhov's The Seagull as "Treplev"
- 1994–95 Victor Haim's The Visitor as "Mataresco
- 1994–95 Directed Bertolt Brecht's The Good Person of Szechuan
- 1993–94 Georg Büchner's Woyzeck as Charlatan
- 1992–93 Necip Fazıl Kısakürek's Bir Adam Yaratmak (The Making of a Man) as "Mansur"
- 1991–92 One-man play, Kus by Coskun Irmak, Karalarin Memetleri as "Ali" by Cahit Atay, Ay Isiginda Samata as "Erol" by Haldun Taner, Genc Osman in various roles
- 1995–96 Turkish Radio and Television Ankara, Turkey

=== Actor ===
- Prime Time TV series Ferhunde Hanimlar as "Tayfun"
- 1991–99 TRT and Private Stations Ankara, Turkey

== Education ==
- 2000—2002 American Film Institute, Directing. Hollywood, California. Masters of Fine Arts. Thesis Film: Condemned
- 1995–1999 Ankara University, Education Sciences Faculty. Education Programs & Training. Ankara, Turkey Masters of Arts. Thesis: Problems of Training Actors in Theatre Education Institutions
- 1991–1995 Hacettepe University, Ankara National Conservatory Theatre Department Ankara, Turkey Masters of Fine Arts Emphasis in Theatre Education and Directing
- 1987–1991 Hacettepe University, Ankara National Conservatory Theatre Department Ankara, Turkey. Bachelor of Arts

== Translations ==
- Adolph Green, Betty Comden Singin' in the Rain
- Beth Henley, Crimes of the Heart
- David Mamet, Sexual Perversity in Chicago
- George Orwell, Animal Farm (Nelson Bond's stage adaptation)
- Sarah Ruhl, Eurydice
- Sarah Ruhl, The Clean House
- Sarah Ruhl, Late, A cowboy Song
- Joe Masteroff, Cabaret
- Alan Ball, Five Women Wearing the Same Dress
- Sarah Kane, 4:48 Psychosis
- Richard Nash, The Rainmaker
- Peter Shaffer, Black Comedy
