= Galileo (magazine) =

Galileo Magazine of Science & Fiction
- Galileo first issue (1976)
- Editor: Charles C. Ryan
- Categories: Science fact & science fiction
- Frequency: Quarterly (issues #1-3); bimonthly (issues #4–16)
- Format: Magazine
- Publisher: Vincent McCaffrey
- Total circulation (July 1978): 50,000
- Founder: Vincent McCaffrey
- Founded: 1976
- First issue: September 1976; 48 years ago
- Final issue Number: January 1980; 16
- Company: Avenue Victor Hugo Publishers (issues #1-6 ) Galileo Magazine, Inc. (issues #7-17)
- Country: U.S.
- Based in: Boston, Massachusetts
- Language: English

Galileo Magazine of Science & Fiction was an American science and science fiction magazine published out of Boston, Massachusetts.

== Publication history ==
The first issue was released in September 1976. Issue #5 was published in October 1977. It then changed to a bimonthly publishing schedule beginning with issue #6 published in January 1978. The last issue published was issue #16 in January 1980. Issue #17 was planned, but the magazine folded and only the covers for #17 were printed.

== Contributors ==
Larry Niven's The Ringworld Engineers was serialized in #13–#16. Other contributors include:

- Brian Aldiss
- Ray Bradbury
- Damien Broderick
- Arthur C. Clarke
- Harlan Ellison
- Joe Haldeman
- Frank Herbert
- Robert Silverberg
- Joan D. Vinge
- Jack Williamson
- Larry Blamire - Illustrator

== Issues ==
- Issue #1 1976 (quarterly)
- Issue #2 1976 (quarterly)
- Issue #3 1977 (quarterly)
- Issue #4 July 1977 (quarterly)
- Issue #5 October 1977 (quarterly)
- Issue #6 January 1978 (bimonthly)
- Issue #7 March 1978 (bimonthly)
- Issue #8 May 1978 (bimonthly)
- Issue #9 July 1978 (bimonthly)
- Issue #10 September 1978 (bimonthly)
- Issue #11 & 12 double issue June 1979 (bimonthly)
- Issue #13 July 1979 (bimonthly)
- Issue #14 September 1979 (bimonthly)
- Issue #15 November 1979 (bimonthly)
- Issue #16 January 1980 (bimonthly)

== See also ==
- List of defunct American magazines
- Locus magazine
- Galactic Central
