= Broken Angel (2008 film) =

- Teaser poster
- Directed by: Aclan Bates
- Written by: Leslie Bates-Büyüktürkoğlu; Tulay Pirlant
- Produced by: Leslie Bates-Büyüktürkoğlu; Kevin Totti Corchiani; Unicvisions
- Starring: Nehir Erdoğan; Nilüfer Açıkalın; Patrick Muldoon; Devon Odessa; Fay Masterson; Jay Karnes; Ayşe Nil Şamlıoğlu; Zachary Charles; Yuri Bradac
- Cinematography: Neil Lisk
- Edited by: Aclan Bates; Radu Ion; Bayard Stryker; Chris Ward
- Music by: Kemal Günüç (Turkish version); Edwin Wendler (international version)
- Production company: Aegean Entertainment Blue Cactus Pictures Kenan Productions
- Distributed by: Warner Bros. Pictures
- Release date: March 14, 2008
- Running time: 121 minutes
- Countries: United States; Turkey
- Languages: English; Turkish

Broken Angel (Turkish: Meleğin Sırları) is a 2008 film adaptation of the novel Windy City (Turkish: Ruzgarli Sehir). The film tells the real-life story of Ebru, a Turkish girl who came to the United States in the 1980s and fell prey to the image of fame and fortune. It was directed by Aclan Bates. Broken Angel premiered in Istanbul and Izmir.

== Plot ==
A young Turkish girl comes to America in search of the life she saw in the movies and on TV. Broken Angel shows that life for a foreigner is not always the Hollywood life, especially when you do not speak the language. As she is slowly swallowed by the realities, only one boy, a deaf artist, can reach her and save her life.

The film also debates American-Turkish relations and the perceptive image of Turks in the U.S. and vice versa.

== Cast ==
- Nehir Erdoğan as Ebru
- Ajla Hodzic as Asli
- Nilüfer Açıkalın as Filiz
- Patrick Muldoon as Kevin
- Devon Odessa as Elizabeth
- Fay Masterson as Mimi
- Jay Karnes as Michael Levy
- Clyde Kusatsu as Dondi
- Colin Fickes as Hank
- Ayşe Nil Şamlıoğlu||
- Maree Cheatham as Mrs. Kraus
- Zachary Charles as Rusty
- Yuri Bradac as Grigori

== Production ==
The picture was filmed in Los Angeles in 2007.
