= The Crooked Eye =

The Crooked Eye is a 20-minute drama film short adapted, directed and edited by D. C. Douglas. It is based on the short story of the same name by Betty Malicoat. In 2009 the film won for Best Animated Short at the Red Rock Film Festival in Utah.

== Synopsis ==
The Crooked Eye follows a quiet woman through her daily drudgery while persistent memories of a recently unraveled marriage dreamily connect the guilty moments that made her world so unreal and unreliable.

== Cast ==
Linda Hunt ... Sharon's Narrator
Fay Masterson ... Sharon
Katherine Boecher ... Rosemary
D. C. Douglas ... Frank
Joe Duer ... Roy
Clement Blake ... Wayne
Monnae Michaell ... Sharon's Supervisor
Ari Barak ... Sharon's Doctor
Robin Daléa ... Sharon's Tough Co-Worker
Karen McClain ... Sharon's Loud Co-Worker

== Awards ==
- Won Grand Jury Prize at Red Rock Film Festival (2009)
- Won Best Screenplay in a HD Short at HDFest (2009)
- Won the STIFFY Award at Seattle True Independent Film Festival (2009)

== Trivia ==
The movie was filmed entirely on green screen. All the environments were animated in post.
