= Tom Reese (actor) =

American actor

- Publicity Photo of Tom Reese
- Born: Tom Allen; August 8, 1928; Chattanooga, Tennessee, U.S.
- Died: December 12, 2017 (aged 89); Studio City, California, U.S.
- Occupation: Actor
- Years active: 1958–2009
- Height: 6 ft 3 in (191 cm)

Tom Reese (August 8, 1928 – December 12, 2017) was an American actor who appeared in many westerns on both the big- and small-screens.

== Early life ==
Reese's father and uncle were country-western singers known as "The Allen Brothers," who traveled and performed bluegrass music with the family. Reese served two tours in the United States Marine Corps, and was a military policeman. His G.I. Bill enabled him to study dramatics at the American Theater Wing. Reese spent fifteen years on the road working nightclubs, studied with Lee Strasberg, and performed off-Broadway and in local TV shows.

== Career ==
His film debut was in John Cassavetes' New York-made Shadows (1958). His next film credit was in the Elvis Presley western Flaming Star (1960). His early film credits also include, Marines, Let's Go (1961), 40 Pounds of Trouble (1962), and Murderers' Row (1966), among others. In 2009 Reese played the part of Inspector Riley in Dark and Stormy Night, an independent film that spoofs both the haunted house and murder mystery genres.

For his television debut in 1959, Cassavetes also cast Reese in an episode of his detective series Johnny Staccato. He would go on to make guest appearances in shows such as Bonanza, Branded, Charlie's Angels, Eight Is Enough, Emergency!, The Fugitive, Gunsmoke, The Guns of Will Sonnett, Have Gun – Will Travel, The High Chaparral, Knight Rider, Kung Fu, Laredo, Lawman, Mannix, Police Woman, Rawhide, Simon & Simon, The Six Million Dollar Man, The Twilight Zone, The Untouchables, The Virginian, The Wild Wild West, and Wonder Woman, among others.

His television career also includes miniseries and movies, such as Dick Tracy (1967), The Hollywood Detective (1989), Once an Eagle (1976), Six Against the Rock (1987), Stranger on the Run (1967), and The Virginia Hill Story (1974) about the real-life girlfriend of mobster Bugsy Siegel.

From 1975 to 1976, Reese had a recurring role as Sergeant Thomas Velie in the television series Ellery Queen. He also appeared in three episodes of The Red Hand Gang (1977) as Dolan's Partner.

At 6'3" and around 230 pounds, Reese has been in a number of notable fight scenes, going up against characters portrayed by other large actors, including James Arness, Chuck Connors, Mike Connors, Tony Curtis, Glenn Ford, Roy Jenson, Dean Martin, Doug McClure, and Elvis Presley, among others. In a comedic fight opposite Woody Allen in Sleeper (1973), Reese was out of action for twelve weeks after being injured.

== Death ==
Reese died in December 2017 in Studio City, California, at the age of 89.

== Filmography ==
=== Film ===
- Shadows (1958) as Tom
- Flaming Star (1960) as Jute
- Marines, Let's Go (1961) as Pfc. Desmond "Let's Go" McCaffrey
- 40 Pounds of Trouble (1962) as Bassett / Uncle Norman
- Taggart (1964) as Vince August
- Blood on the Arrow (1964) as Charlie
- The Greatest Story Ever Told (1965) as Thomas
- The Money Trap (1966) as Matthews
- Murderers' Row (1966) as Ironhead
- The St. Valentine's Day Massacre (1967) as Ted Newberry
- Support Your Local Sheriff! (1969) as Gunfighter (uncredited)
- Vanishing Point (1971) as Sheriff
- The Outfit (1973) as Hit Man
- The Wild Party (1975) as Eddy
- North Dallas Forty (1979) as Coach Waddy
- Dark and Stormy Night (2009) as Inspector Riley

=== Television ===
Year	Title	Role	Notes
1959	Johnny Staccato	Eddie Dasko	"The Return "
1960	Bonanza	Burton	"Blood on the Land"
1960	Gunsmoke	Tulsa	"Gentleman's Disagreement"
1960	Gunsmoke	Leeds	"Friend's Pay-Off"
1960	Have Gun – Will Travel	Yates	"The Tender Gun"
1960	My Sister Eileen	Alan Dahorsameche, "The Wreck"	"You Should Meet My Sister"
1961	Gunsmoke	Ben	"Tall Trapper"
1961	Gunsmoke	Scorp	"Harriet"
1961	Lawman	Bob Mengis	"The Son"
1961	The Twilight Zone	Intruder	"The Midnight Sun"
1962	Gunsmoke	Wellman	"Reprisal"
1962	The Virginian	Wid	"Woman from White Wing"
1963	The Untouchables	Sonny Dale	"Search for a Dead Man"
1964	Bonanza	Lee Burton	"The Underdog"
1965	The Fugitive	Norman	"Scapegoat"
1964	Gunsmoke	Judd	"Friend"
1964	Rawhide	Bert Carrico	"Piney"
1965	Gunsmoke	Wayne Hooker	"The Pariah"
1965	Gunsmoke	Wade Keys	"The Hostage"
1965	Laredo	Tom Baker	"The Golden Trail"
1965	Rawhide	Jennings	"Escort to Doom"
1965	The Virginian	Hans Wollsack	"Dangerous Road"
1965	The Wild Wild West	Wagon Driver	"The Night of the Inferno"
1966	Bonanza	Sgt. Devlin	"The Last Mission"
1966	Branded	Jess Muhler	"McCord's Way"
1966	Gunsmoke	Okie	"The Brothers"
1966	Gunsmoke	Dave Westerfeldt	"Quaker Girl"
1966	Laredo	Jake McBryde	"That's Noway, Thataway"
1967	Dick Tracy	Ben	TV movie
1967	The Guns of Will Sonnett	Lando	"Meeting at Devil's Fork"
1967	Gunsmoke	Ben Stearman	"Nitro!" Parts 1 & 2
1967	Stranger on the Run	Leo Weed	TV movie
1968	Gunsmoke	Slick Ragan	"Waco"
1968	The High Chaparral	Judson	"Ebenezer"
1969	The Bold Ones: The Protectors	Tony Stovall	"Draw a Straight Man"
1969	Land of the Giants	Sgt. Gedo	"Rescue"
1972	Mannix	Sweeny	"Lost Sunday"
1973	Mannix	Springer	"Cry Danger"
1974	Emergency!	Dando	"Details"
1974	Kung Fu	Sheriff	"Blood of the Dragon (Part 1)"
1974	The Six Million Dollar Man	Joe Alabam	"The Last of the Fourth of Julys"
1974	The Virginia Hill Story	Mac Hill	TV movie
1975	Gunsmoke	Charlie Dent	"The Squaw"
1975	Ellery Queen	Sgt. Thomas Velie	22 episodes (1975–1976)
1976	Once an Eagle	Sergeant Stoner	TV mini series, parts 4 & 5
1976	Police Woman	Piers	"The Melting Point of Ice"
1976	Wonder Woman	Carl	"Wonder Woman vs Gargantua"
1977	Charlie's Angels	Reed	"Circus of Terror"
1977	The Red Hand Gang	Dolan's Partner	3 episodes
1978	Eight Is Enough	Jack O'Hara	"A Hair of the Dog"
1982	Simon & Simon	Frost	"Double Entry"
1984	Knight Rider	Brother Carey	"The Ice Bandits"
1987	Six Against the Rock	Captain Weinhold	TV movie
1989	The Hollywood Detective	Lt. Victor Grabouski	TV movie
