= Stranger on the Run =

1967 TV film

- DVD cover of Stranger on the Run
- Genre: Drama; Western
- Based on: Reginald Rose
- Written by: Dean Riesner
- Directed by: Donald Siegel
- Starring: Henry Fonda; Anne Baxter; Michael Parks
- Music by: Leonard Rosenman
- Country of origin: United States
- Original language: English

Production
- Producer: Richard E. Lyons
- Cinematography: Russell Harlan
- Editor: Bruce B. Pierce
- Running time: 97 minutes
- Production company: Universal Television

Original release
- Network: NBC
- Release: October 31, 1967

Stranger on the Run is a 1967 American made-for-television Western film directed by Donald Siegel and starring Henry Fonda (in his television film debut), Anne Baxter and Michael Parks. In some countries it premiered in cinemas.

== Plot ==
Former inmate and alcoholic Ben Chamberlain comes to a railway town inquiring about a woman, of whom all seem afraid to speak; he receives a beating just for asking. Chamberlain braves the threats and calls at her house; he discovers her strewn, beaten dead body. The sheriff and his posse of local thuggish enforcers, incorrectly assuming that Chamberlain is the culprit because he left town without reason, form a posse. Although they catch him in the desert, the sheriff prevents his being lynched and gives him a horse and a head-start chance to reach the border. Chamberlain meets a lonely, widowed homesteader, a woman whose troubles also include a son who aspires to be a gunman, but does not have the steely nature it takes. Chamberlain and she start to develop a mutual attraction, but this is interrupted when the posse arrives.

Both her son and the town need a new beginning in life. If the two can survive a 20-minute gunfight before the sheriff arrives, then all may be given their last chance in life.

== Cast ==
- Henry Fonda as Ben Chamberlain
- Anne Baxter as Valvera Johnson
- Michael Parks as Vince McKay
- Dan Duryea as O.E. Hotchkiss
- Sal Mineo as George Blaylock
- Lloyd Bochner as Mr. Gorman
- Michael Burns as Matt Johnson
- Tom Reese as Leo Weed
- Bernie Hamilton as Dickory
- Zalman King as Larkin
- Madlyn Rhue as Alma Britten
- Walter Burke as Abraham Berk
- Rodolfo Acosta as Mercurio
- George Dunn as Pilney
- Pepe Hern as Manolo

== Reception ==
Quentin Tarantino called it Siegel's best western after Flaming Star. He stated, "even though it has the Universal TV look of a The Virginian episode, it has, after Andy Robinson's performance as Scorpio in Dirty Harry, the best performance in a Siegel film: Michael Parks as stoic, resilient, walrus-mustached sheriff Vince McKay."

Biographer Judith M. Kass offers this assessment of Stranger on the Run:

"Although made for television, Stranger shows that Siegel gave it as much attention as any of his best feature work. Its muted tans, dusty atmosphere and the feeling of most of the inhabitants that the town is in the grip of a force stronger than itself pervades the film. It is a movie that parallels much in Siegel's feature film work."

Kass adds: "By constructing a narrow world where good confronts evil, often within the same personality, Siegel's films show the audience his preoccupations."

== Sources ==
- Kass, Judith M. (1975). Don Seigel: The Hollywood Professionals, Volume 4 (1975 ed.). New York: Tanvity Press. p. 207. ISBN 0-498-01665-X.
