= These Are the Days (TV series) =

- Voices of: Frank Cady; Pamelyn Ferdin; Moosie Drier; Sam Edwards; Jack Haley; Henry Jones; June Lockhart; Andrew Parks
- Country of origin: United States
- Original language: English
- No. of seasons: 1
- No. of episodes: 16

Production
- Executive producers: William Hanna; Joseph Barbera
- Running time: 30 minutes
- Production company: Hanna-Barbera Productions

Original release
- Network: ABC
- Release: September 7, 1974 – September 27, 1975

These Are the Days is a 30-minute Saturday morning animated series produced by Hanna-Barbera Productions and broadcast on ABC from September 7, 1974, to September 27, 1975.

== Plot ==
Set at the turn of the 20th century in a small town called Elmsville located somewhere on the Great Plains, These Are the Days portrayed the everyday lives of the Day family, which consisted of a widow, her three children and her father, a self-styled inventor. Various family members interacted with friends and neighbors, with the story usually ending with a lesson learned.

== Production ==
Due to the popularity of The Waltons, ABC decided to take a chance on an animated program set around the turn of the century. It was one of three "serious" programs the network aired on Saturday mornings in 1974, the others being the prehistoric live-action drama Korg: 70,000 B.C. and the animated family drama Devlin. These Are the Days and Devlin were among the very few dramatic programs ever produced by Hanna-Barbera, who were known primarily for slapstick comedies and action-adventure cartoons. (Warner Bros. has since acquired Hanna-Barbera Productions via Turner Entertainment, as well as Lorimar Productions, which produced The Waltons.)

Despite critical acclaim, however, These Are the Days was a ratings failure, as were Devlin and Korg: 70,000 B.C.; all three series were cancelled by the end of the year. These Are the Days continued in re-runs (only twelve original episodes were shown in the fall of 1974), with four new episodes shown in September 1975.

== Cast ==
- Frank Cady as Homer Gladfet
- Pamelyn Ferdin as Kathy Day
- Jackie Earl Haley as Danny Day
- Henry Jones as Jeff Day
- June Lockhart as Martha Day
- Andrew Parks as Ben Day

== Episodes ==
No.	Title	Original release date
1	"Sensible Ben"	September 7, 1974
An introduction to the Day family and their friends. The normally sensible Ben is swindled out of his savings by a hustler, but he is not the only person to be conned.
2	"The Fire Brigade"	September 14, 1974
Grandpa Day loses his job as a fireman when he is told he is too old to do the job.
3	"Danny's Musical Dilemma"	September 21, 1974
Danny is torn between doing what he wants to do and what he should do. The Day family has their annual family reunion on the same day as the tryouts for a band that he wants to join. He only has a few hours left to make his decision.
4	"Danny Runs Away"	September 28, 1974
Jeff tries to play peacemaker between Ben and Danny, only to have it backfire on him. Danny gets so upset by the situation that he decides to run away from home. Ben and Jeff set out to find their brother before he gets too far away or is injured.
5	"Ben for President"	October 5, 1974
Ben decides to make a run for class President and hopes for the support of his family and friends. He finds himself disappointed when one of his supporters becomes a challenger for the job.
6	"The Good Luck Charm"	October 12, 1974
After Danny gets two black eyes from the local bully, Judd Taylor, Ben gives him a piece of a lamp to use as a good luck charm.
7	"Kathy's Job"	October 19, 1974
Kathy gets a job at Gundersen's Ice Cream Parlor in order to buy a dress for an upcoming dance.
8	"The Runaway Horse"	October 26, 1974
Ben wants to keep a runaway horse, and names it Pegasus.
9	"How Ben Was Cowed"	November 2, 1974
When Jeff's prize cow, Delilah, wanders off due to carelessness on Ben's part, he and his siblings set out to find her and bring her home before Martha and Jeff return from running errands in another town.
10	"Grandpa and the Great Cyclic Harmonium Swindle"	November 9, 1974
Jeff invents the cyclic harmonium, a bicycle with a gramophone attached. Mr. Whitehead and Mr. Barnaby swindle him out of $750. Ben, Kathy, and Danny concoct a plan to get the money back.
11	"The Visitor"	November 16, 1974
Murdock the magician comes to town, and agrees to take part in a benefit show to raise money for a new bell at the town hall.
12	"The Most Precious Gift of All"	November 23, 1974
Danny forgets to buy Jeff a birthday present. So when he finds a watch bob in the street, he decides to give it as a gift, only to discover it was lost by his coach.
13	"The Spa"	September 6, 1975
The Days discover a hot spring on their property, and Jeff decides to use it as a spa.
14	"Hello Mrs. McGivern, Goodbye"	September 13, 1975
Mrs McGivern is brought in to act as a housekeeper while Martha visits her mother. Trouble is, this housekeeper subjects the kids and Jonas to strict discipline.
15	"The Balloon"	September 20, 1975
Jeff decides to use a hot air balloon to facilitate hauling logs. Homer steals it after he and Jeff argue about a property line.
16	"The Feud"	September 27, 1975
Jeff and his friend Rupert Bottomley begin feuding over a catfish, with Danny Day and Rupert's grandson, Butch, caught in the crosshairs.

== Broadcast ==
The series was initially broadcast on Saturday mornings on ABC from September 7, 1974 through September 5, 1976. The series was rebroadcast on Cartoon Network from June 28, 1993 through September 17, 1993.
