= Brian Howe (actor) =

American actor

- Born: United States
- Occupation: Actor
- Years active: 1996–present
- Height: 6 ft 0 in (183 cm)

Brian Howe is an American actor. He is best known for his portrayal of stockbroker Jay Twistle in the film The Pursuit of Happyness.

== Career ==
His other films include K-PAX, The Majestic, Catch Me If You Can, RV, Déjà Vu, Return to Me, Evan Almighty, Gran Torino (as Steve Kowalski) and Annabelle. Howe has appeared in guest roles in a number of television series, including Crossing Jordan, Criminal Minds, Judging Amy, Law & Order, The Unit, Without a Trace, Boston Legal, The Shield, Lie to Me, Charmed, and was a regular on Journeyman as the newspaper editor until the cancellation of the show by NBC in December 2007 due to low ratings. More recently, he has had recurring roles on Nikita, Justified and Westworld. In 2021, he had a main role in Kevin Can F**k Himself as Peter McRoberts.

Howe is part of the stock company formed by filmmaker Larry Blamire, and has played Dr. Roger Fleming, the evil scientist who awakens the skeleton, in the 2004 science-fiction spoof The Lost Skeleton of Cadavra, his twin brother Peter Fleming in its sequel, The Lost Skeleton Returns Again, the dim but heroic sailor Big Dan Frater in Trail of the Screaming Forehead, and the foppish Englishman Burling Famish Jr. in Dark and Stormy Night.

== Selected filmography ==
=== Television ===
Year	Title	Role	Notes
1988	Spenser: For Hire	Cab Driver	Episode: "Hawk's Eyes"
1994	Law & Order	Duffy	Episode: "Snatched"
1995-97	Bonnie	Sammy Sinatra	Main role
1997	Dave's World	Bryce	Episode: "Touched by an Agent"
1997	Law & Order	John Mack	Episode: "Barter"
1999	Law & Order	Detective Harry Sorkin	Episode: "Hate"
1999	LateLine	Freddy	Episode: "Protecting the Source"
1999	Family Law	John Carrigalo	Episode: "Damages"
2000	The Huntress	Anthony Jackson	Episode: "The Kid"
2000	Touched by an Angel	Jerry Fleming	Episode: "Quality Time"
2000	Grosse Pointe	Photographer	Uncredited; Episode: "Thieves Like Us"
2001	Crossing Jordan	Cosgrove	Episode: "The Ties That Bind"
2001	CSI: Crime Scene Investigation	Mr. Winston	Episode: "Face Lift"
2001	Any Day Now	Cary Johnson	2 episodes
2001	Dead Last	Bill Dotson	Episode: "Laughlin It Up"
2001	Touched by an Angel	Sheriff Charlie	Episode: "A Winter Carol"
2001	Felicity	Eric Scott	Episode: "A Perfect Match
2002	Will & Grace	Ken	Episode: "He Shoots, They Snore"
2002	Judging Amy	Police Officer	Episode: "Thursday's Child"
2003	The District	Hatfield	Episode: "Untouchable"
2003	Boomtown	Bartender	Episode: "Blackout"
2003-04	A Minute with Stan Hooper	Gary	Main role
2003	Good Morning, Miami	Steve	Episode: "Good Morning, Manhattan"
2004	Quintuplets	Paul	Episode: "Quint Con"
2005	Charmed	Ronny	Episode: "Ordinary Witches"
2005	CSI: Miami	Dale Buford	Episode: "Nothing to Lose"
2005	Killer Instinct	Marty	Episode: "Forget Me Not
2006	The Unit	Special Agent Griffiths	Episode: "Stress"
2006	All of Us	Unknown	Episode: "The N-Word"
2006	Without a Trace	Grant Stoker	Episode: "Crossroads"
2007	NCIS	Sheriff Tom Barrett	Episode: "Suspicion"
2007	The Shield	Carlos Morganza	Episode: "Haunts"
2007	Journeyman	Hugh Skillen	Main role
2008	Boston Legal	Martin Monrow	Episode: "Dances with Wolves"
2008	Bones	Sheriff Leonard Wilkinson	Episode: "The Con Man in the Meth Lab"
2009	Numb3rs	Robert Posdner	Episode: "Disturbed"
2009	Mental	Bob Escamilla	Episode: "Life and Limb"
2009	CSI: Crime Scene Investigation	Harvey Wincroft	Episode: "Ghost Town"
2009	Three Rivers	Mr. Hubbell	Episode: "Code Green"
2009	Lie to Me	Garrett Denning	Episode: "Lack of Candor"
2010	Cold Case	Harry Denton '74	Episode: "The Runaway Bunny"
2010	Nip/Tuck	Ron Mark	Episode: "Dr. Griffin"
2010	The Mentalist	Arliss St. Germain	Episode: "Red Herring"
2010	The Defenders	Chief of Detectives	Uncredited; Episode: "Las Vegas vs. Johnson"
2010	Medium	John Claybourne	Episode: "The People in Your Neighborhood"
2011	The Cape	Mick Reese	3 episodes
2011	The Closer	Nick Rhodes	Episode: "Death Warrant"
2011	Against the Wall	Father Chet	Episode: "Wonder What God's Up To"
2012	Castle	Aaron Lerner	Episode: "Murder He Wrote"
2012	NCIS: Los Angeles	Jack Caldwell	Episode: "Dead Body Politic"
2012-13	Nikita	Morgan Kendrick	3 episodes
2012-13	Franklin & Bash	A.D.A. Brad Hewett	2 episodes
2013	Justified	Arnold	Recurring role (season 4)
2013	The Client List	Judge Overton	Recurring role (season 2)
2013	Longmire	Dale Lowry	Episode: "The Road to Hell"
2013-15	Masters of Sex	Sam Duncan	3 episodes
2013	Betrayal	Frank Perkins / Matthew Hendricks	2 episodes
2013-14	Hart of Dixie	Gerald Thibodaux	2 episodes
2014	Grey's Anatomy	Robert Fischer	Episode: "Take It Back"
2014	Growing Up Fisher	Unknown	Episode: "The Man with the Spider Tattoo"
2014	The Newsroom	Barry Lasenthal	3 episodes
2015	House of Lies	Dante Valerio	2 episodes
2015	Criminal Minds	Alex Zorgen	Episode: "The Hunt"
2016	CSI: Cyber	Richard Reynolds	Episode: "404: Flight Not Found"
2016	American Horror Story	Mark Phillips	Episode: "Chapter 10"
2016	Westworld	Sheriff Pickett	3 episodes
2016	The Middle	Tom	Episode: "Trip and Fall"
2016-17	The Last Tycoon	Red Ridingwood	2 episodes
2016-17	Vice Principals	Superintendent Jeremy Haas	Recurring role
2017	Survivor's Remorse	Mike Valorose	Episode: "The Gala"
2017	SEAL Team	Oliver Carter	Episode: "Ghost of Christmas Future"
2017	Designated Survivor	Harry	Episode: "Home"
2017-20	Chicago Fire	Nick Porter	Recurring role
2018	S.W.A.T.	Craig	Episode: "Crews"
2018-19	Superstore	Neil Penderson	2 episodes
2018	Code Black	Richard Fields	Episode: "The Same as Air"
2018	Ghosted	Terry Katzenberg	Episode: "The Airplane"
2018	9-1-1	Harlow	Episode: "7.1"
2019	Ryan Hansen Solves Crimes on Television	Warden Lafors	Episode: "The Ry Guy Goes to Jail"
2019	Hawaii Five-0	Carl	Episode: "E'ao lu'au a kualima"
2019	Grand Hotel	Detective Kelly	Episode: "Groom Service"
2019	All Rise	Wallace Fisk	Episode: "Drispy"
2021-22	Kevin Can F**k Himself	Peter McRoberts	Main role
2022	Super Pumped	Donald Kalanick	3 episodes
2023-26	Shrinking	Kip	3 episodes
2024	Georgie & Mandy's First Marriage	Dr. Hill	Episode: "Some New York Nonsense"
2025	High Potential	Gavin Tillman	Episode: "Content Warning
2026	Spider-Noir	Carmedy	Supporting role
2026	The Hawk	Gus	5 episodes

=== Film ===
Year	Title	Role	Notes
2000	Return to Me	Mike	
2001	K-PAX	Dr. Steven Becker	
2001	The Majestic	Carl Leffert	
2001	The Lost Skeleton of Cadavra	Dr. Roger Fleming	
2002	Catch Me If You Can	FBI Agent Earl Amdursky	
2006	RV	Marty	
2006	Déjà Vu	Medical Examiner	
2006	The Pursuit of Happyness	Jay Twistle	
2007	Evan Almighty	Builder	
2007	Trail of the Screaming Forehead	Big Dan Frater	
2008	Gran Torino	Steve Kowalski	
2009	Dark and Stormy Night	Burling Famish Jr.	
2014	Annabelle	Pete Higgins	
2017	Annabelle: Creation	Pete Higgins	
2021	Sweet Girl	Pete Micelli	
2021	Being the Ricardos	Charles Koerner	
