= Lili Rocha =

- Also known as: Lili Rocha
- Born: Lindinalva de Souza Rocha; Bahia, Brazil
- Genres: Pop, pop rock, rock
- Occupations: Singer, musician
- Instrument: Vocals
- Labels: IDEA Musica, Milan, Italy
- Website: Official website

Lindinalva de Souza Rocha (born December 23), better known by her stage name Lili Rocha, is a Brazilian pop rock musician who started her career in Italy with her first album, Me Deixa Sonhar (2003).

== Life and career ==
Rocha won the Gabriela talent show in Ilhéus, Brazil. She then toured in Portugal, Italy, and Switzerland, and subsequently moved to Switzerland to study at the Accademia di Musica Italiana under Antonio Guglielmi, with whom she recorded her early songs.

Her albums contain songs in Portuguese, Spanish, and Italian. Me Deixa Sonhar (2003) was released in Italy and Brazil. Her second album, Recomeçar (2004), was released in Europe. Rocha's third album, Amuleto (2007), was followed by a concert tour in Italy and Spain, which produced the live album Lili Rocha Live (2009).

Rocha later recorded an English album in the United States, performing in New York City, Los Angeles, and Miami.

== Discography ==
- Me Deixa Sonhar (2003)
- Recomeçar (2004)
- Amuleto (2007)
- Lili Rocha Live (2009)
- Lili Rocha Rocks! (2010)

== See also ==
• Music of Brazil
