= The Lost Skeleton of Cadavra =

2001 film by Larry Blamire

- Promotional release poster
- Directed by: Larry Blamire
- Written by: Larry Blamire
- Produced by: F. Miguel Valenti
- Starring: Larry Blamire; Fay Masterson; Andrew Parks; Susan McConnell; Brian Howe; Jennifer Blaire
- Cinematography: Kevin F. Jones
- Edited by: Bill Bryn Russell
- Production companies: TriStar Pictures; Fragmighty; Transom Films; Valenti Entertainment
- Distributed by: Sony Pictures Releasing
- Release dates: October 8, 2001 (Mill Valley Film Festival); March 12, 2004 (United States)
- Running time: 90 minutes
- Country: United States
- Language: English
- Budget: $40,000

The Lost Skeleton of Cadavra is a 2001 American independent science-fiction parody film directed by Larry Blamire. The film is a spoof of B movies released during the 1950s. The film was videotaped on a budget of less than US$100,000, and was converted to black-and-white film in post-production. Larry Blamire acted in and directed the film, wrote its screenplay, and provided the voice of the film's titular Skeleton. Jennifer Blaire, who performs Animala, is Blamire's wife.

The film, which was shot at Bronson Canyon in Los Angeles, California, premiered at the Mill Valley Film Festival on October 8, 2001 and received a limited release in theatres on March 12, 2004.

== Plot ==
In 1961, scientist Dr. Paul Armstrong and his wife Betty drive into the mountains. Dr. Armstrong is searching for a meteorite that has fallen in the nearby woods, suspected to contain the rare element atmosphereum. Another scientist in the area, Dr. Roger Fleming questions Ranger Brad about Cadavra Cave, a site rumored to contain a "Lost Skeleton".

That evening, both the Armstrongs and Dr. Fleming observe another falling meteor. A short time later a farmer, encountered by the Armstrongs on their way to the cabin, is mutilated by a mysterious beast. The second meteorite is actually a spaceship carrying two aliens. Kro-Bar and Lattis are from the planet Marva and are now stranded on Earth, in need of the element atmosphereum to repair their powerless ship. The ship's pet mutant escapes from its cage while they are distracted.

The next day, Dr. Roger Fleming finds Cadavra Cave and locates the Lost Skeleton. The Skeleton commands Fleming to bring atmosphereum to resurrect him. Meanwhile, Dr. Armstrong and Betty venture into the woods, discovering the meteorite just outside Cadavra Cave. Dr. Fleming overhears them and plots to steal the meteorite from the pair. Kro-Bar and Lattis also journey into the woods, locating the cabin with the meteorite. Using a device called the "transmutatron," they disguise themselves as "Earth people" and clumsily manage to talk their way into the cabin, having been mistaken for the property owners. Not long after they arrive, Dr. Fleming discovers the aliens' transmutatron, left outside the cabin since it would ruin their disguise. He uses it to create an ally for himself, the alluring Animala (Jennifer Blaire), created from four different animals. After briefly teaching Animala the basics of human interaction, he leads her to the cabin and convinces the Armstrongs to invite him inside.

Soon it becomes clear to Lattis and Kro-Bar (calling themselves "Turgaso" and "Bammin" on Earth in an effort to pass as earth humans) that Fleming knows their secret. They soon cooperate in stealing the meteorite, after Betty is psychically attacked by the Skeleton and Dr. Armstrong is entranced by Animala's dancing. The evil scientist tricks the pair, however, and the Skeleton uses his mind powers to freeze the aliens in their tracks once Dr. Fleming has the meteorite. Dr. Fleming and Animala soon use the atmosphereum to resurrect the Skeleton. Meanwhile, Betty, waiting for Dr. Armstrong to come back, encounters the Mutant, who appears to fall in love with her, but she is terrified and faints.

While Fleming and Animala are resurrecting the skeleton, Armstrong arrives and encounters the unfrozen aliens. They also find Betty, who has realized that the mutant has some sort of feelings for her. After bonding over a meal, the four head off to try to obtain the meteorite before it can be used to resurrect the skeleton, but they are attacked by the Mutant. Dr. Armstrong is injured in the fight, but realizes that the monster does not want to harm Betty. Armstrong and his wife return to the cabin to recover, while the aliens try to stop Fleming on their own. However, they are captured by the skeleton's mind powers, and forced to dance by his psychic powers.

The Skeleton uses his mental powers to force Lattis into becoming his bride, much to Kro-Bar's chagrin. The Skeleton mocks everyone, including Fleming, but keeps them in line with his telepathy. When Armstrong sees what is going on, he comes up with a plan to get Betty to lure the Mutant to the wedding to disrupt it. After getting the Mutant to follow them, Armstrong and Betty attack Fleming and Animala. During the fight, the Skeleton kills Fleming after the latter is beaten by Armstrong. The Mutant then arrives at the wedding and attacks the Skeleton, whose powers do not affect beings with as simple minds as the Mutant. They instead fight until the Skeleton is thrown over a cliff, smashing apart on impact. The mutant then succumbs to its injuries and dies. Animala is turned back into the animals she originally was via the transmutatron. The alien and human couples spout traditional homilies about different species working together in harmony, then go to retrieve the atmosphereum.

== Cast ==
- Larry Blamire as Dr. Paul Armstrong
- Fay Masterson as Betty Armstrong
- Andrew Parks as Kro-Bar/Bammin
- Susan McConnell as Lattis/Turgaso
- Brian Howe as Dr. Roger Fleming
- Jennifer Blaire as Animala
- Dan Conroy as Ranger Brad
- Robert Deveau as the Farmer
- Darrin Reed as the Mutant

== Production ==
It was partly filmed in Bronson Canyon, a legendary B-movie location. Actors were instructed to give wooden performances to help with the intentional cheesiness of the film. In total, it took five days to write, and just over ten days to film.

== Release ==
The film premiered at the Mill Valley Film Festival in Mill Valley, California on October 8, 2001. Acquired by Sony Pictures' Michael Schlesinger after a screening at the American Cinematheque in Hollywood, the film was released in theaters in February 2004, and on DVD in June 2004.

== Reception ==
The Lost Skeleton of Cadavra has received mixed reviews. The film has a rating of 54% on review aggregation website Rotten Tomatoes, based on 69 critic reviews. The website's critics consensus reads, "Lost Skeleton is clever at spoofing B-movies, but the joke isn't sustainable for its running time." On Metacritic, the film has a score of 45% based on 23 critic reviews, indicating "mixed or average reviews".

Dave Kehr of The New York Times called it "a gray, unfunny parody of 1950's science fiction films". Roger Ebert gave the film 1-and-a-half out of 4 stars, writing that "'The Lost Skeleton of Cadavra' has been made by people who are trying to be bad, which by definition reveals that they are playing beneath their ability". Keith Phipps of The A.V. Club wrote that "Once the initial joke wears off, Skeleton is a dull slog that even the miracle process of 'Skeletorama' can't set right".

Dennis Harvey of Variety wrote that the film "takes true trash cinema devotion to satirize the clunky visuals, banal dialogue, logic gaps and pseudoscientific silliness of a bygone era’s schlockiest obscurities quite so accurately, complete with one-beat-tardy editorial rhythms". Ed Gonzales and Jeremiah Kipp, writing for Slant Magazine, said that the "perilously low budget plays to Lost Skeleton's advantage, and the scant 90-minute running time assures that it doesn’t wear out its welcome".

== Sequels ==
A sequel, The Lost Skeleton Returns Again, was filmed in March 2008, again written and directed by Blamire, produced by Mark Allen Stuart, and featuring virtually all of the original cast (though three actors whose characters were killed in the original are back in different roles), as well as several actors who appeared in Blamire's subsequent Trail of the Screaming Forehead. However, unlike the first film, it does not repeat the "ultra-cheap independent" feel, but is intended to look more like a studio B-picture from the same era, such as those produced by Sam Katzman or Edward Small. It had its world premiere at the Mill Valley Film Festival October 4, 2008 and its Los Angeles premiere November 9 at the Egyptian Theatre. The film began its theatrical run at the Coolidge Corner in Boston on May 21, 2010, and was released on DVD by Shout! Factory on August 17, 2010, as was another Blamire film, Dark and Stormy Night.

In January 2012, Blamire announced on his Facebook page that a third picture, The Lost Skeleton Walks Among Us, was in development. In November 2012, a Dread Central article by Sean Decker announced that Blamire was teaming with famed monster-maker Cleve Hall to make the picture in 2013, but it was delayed by a book project. Early in 2014, Blamire posted on his Facebook page that production was now targeted for that year, and a Kickstarter campaign was begun in June. The funding goal was not met (as per the project's Kickstarter page), and the project remains unrealized as of early 2026.
