= Theatre West =

American theatre company from Los Angeles, California

Coordinates: 34.1308°N 118.3511°W

Theatre West is a theatre company in Hollywood, California, the oldest continually-operating theatre company in Los Angeles.

== History ==
Originally conceived as a venue for working professional actors in the film and television industries to exercise their artistic skills in roles and material far different from what they were called upon to do in front of the camera, Theatre West was founded by Joyce Van Patten, Betty Garrett, Charles Aidman and came together as an informal workshop led by Curt Conway. Among its early members were Scott Marlowe, Philip Abbott, Barbara Rush, Sandy Kenyon, Robert Elston, Naomi Caryl, Richard Dreyfuss, Jack Nicholson, Lee Meriwether, Martin Landau, Earl Holliman, Harry Dean Stanton, Sally Field, Beau Bridges, Carroll O'Connor, Harold Gould, and Marvin Kaplan. More recent members include Chazz Palminteri, Ray Bradbury, Jim Beaver, John Cygan, Sherwood Schwartz, Pat Harrington, Cecily Adams, Bridget Hanley, Anne Haney, Leslie Caveny, and William Blinn.

One of the company's earliest and most successful productions went on to become a Broadway hit and a treasured perennial of the American theatre. Spoon River Anthology, Charles Aidman's dramatization of poetry of Edgar Lee Masters, was developed in the Theatre West workshop, was transferred to television, and since 1963 has been performed in thousands of productions around the world.

More recently, Chazz Palminteri's A Bronx Play was developed in the Theatre West workshop, produced by the company, moved to Off-Broadway and then became a feature film, A Bronx Tale, directed by and starring Robert De Niro. John Gallogly adapted and directed two poems by Poet Laureate James Dickey, author of 'Deliverance', that starred Bridget Hanley. May Day Sermon was nominated as Best of the Fest by BBC Scotland at the Edinburgh Festival. Bronwen, the Traw, and the Shape-Shifter premiered after Mr. Dickey's death. Both plays were selected by the California Arts Council for inclusion in the Touring Artists Directory and played throughout California as well as in Atlanta, South Carolina and other states. Love of a Pig by Leslie Caveny traveled to Dublin and is produced around the United States.

A vital part of the company is Storybook Theatre, an acclaimed program of original musical plays for children. Begun in 1984, by Lloyd J. Schwartz and Barbara Mallory Schwartz, Storybook Theatre has been honored with commendations from the United States Senate and House of Representatives in addition to scores of local theatre and civic awards and commendations. Storybook Theatre presents interactive, non-threatening musicals with a message.

The company is a democratic membership company, run by an artistic board of directors elected by the membership. In addition to producing plays, the theatre presents workshops for actors, writers, musical comedy performers, and students of William Shakespeare, and a special two-year free training class for young professionals, the associate membership. Membership is primarily by audition (for actors) and script submission (for writers). Current artistic moderators for the workshops are Arden Teresa Lewis (actors), Doug Haverty and Christine DiGiovanni (writers), Anthony Grupposo (musical comedy), and Nick McDow (Shakespeare). The managing director is Lindsay Lefler. The current Artistic Board of Directors is composed of established Los Angeles-based actors/writers/directors and includes Rick Simone, David Mingrino, Constance Mellors, Laura James, Michael Van Duzer, and Dina Morrone.

Among Theatre West productions are Morning's at Seven with Betty Garrett, Marvin Kaplan, and Malachi Throne, Patrick Hamilton's Gaslight, an original adaptation, Acting - The First Six Lessons starring Beau Bridges and Emily Bridges, James Goldman's The Lion in Winter starring Jim Beaver and Bridget Hanley, Beaver's own play Verdigris, Rod Serling's Requiem for a Heavyweight, Charlie Mount's political thriller The Leather Apron Club, and Garry Michael Kluger's A Thorn In The Family Paw, Steve Nevil's comedy The Night Forlorn, or Waitin' on Godsford. Theatre West reopened on September 24 after being closed due to the Covid-19 pandemic with the world premiere of Our Man in Santiago by Mark Wilding.
