= James Karen =

American actor (1923–2018)

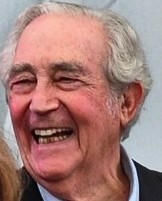
- Karen in 2014
- Born: Jacob Karnofsky; November 28, 1923; Wilkes-Barre, Pennsylvania, U.S.
- Died: October 23, 2018 (aged 94); Los Angeles, California, U.S.
- Other name: Mr. Pathmark
- Education: Neighborhood Playhouse School of the Theatre
- Occupation: Actor
- Years active: 1948–2018
- Spouses: Susan Reed (m. 1958; div. 1967); Alba Francesca (m. 1986)
- Children: 1

James Karen (born Jacob Karnofsky; November 28, 1923 – October 23, 2018) was an American character actor of Broadway, film and television. Karen is known for his roles in Poltergeist, The China Syndrome, Wall Street, The Return of the Living Dead, Invaders from Mars and The Pursuit of Happyness, but was perhaps best known as the signature pitchman for Pathmark, famously appearing in commercials for the East Coast supermarket chain from the late 1970s to the early 1990s which earned his nickname "Mr. Pathmark".

Karen is also known for his recurring television role as Tom Bradford's boss, Eliot Randolph, in Eight Is Enough. He was nominated for a Saturn Award for his 1985 role in The Return of the Living Dead. He also appeared in an episode of Cheers as Frasier's mentor and the father of Carla's sixth child.

== Early life ==
Karen was born Jacob Karnofsky in Wilkes-Barre, in northeastern Pennsylvania, the son of Russian-born Jewish immigrants Mae (née Freed) and Joseph H. Karnofsky, a produce dealer. His cousin was Morris Carnovsky, a prominent actor and co-founder of the Group Theatre.

As a young man, Karen was encouraged to be an actor by U.S. Democratic Congressman Daniel J. Flood, who was an amateur thespian himself, recruiting him into a production at the Little Theatre of Wilkes-Barre. He attended the Neighborhood Playhouse School of the Theatre in New York. Karen also served in the U.S. Army Air Forces during World War II.

== Career ==
Karen's big break came when he was asked to understudy Karl Malden in the original Broadway production of A Streetcar Named Desire.

On television, he played Dr. Burke on As the World Turns and was the original Lincoln Tyler on All My Children. He was perhaps best known for his recurring role on the television series Eight Is Enough. He is also well-known on the East Coast for his 20 years as television and radio spokesman for the Pathmark supermarket chain. On the streets of New York, Karen was known as "Mr. Pathmark".

Karen appeared in an episode of the 1977 NBC situation comedy The Kallikaks, and played Earl Silbert in the 1979 miniseries Blind Ambition, and M*A*S*H season 11, episode 12 on 1/23/83. A decade later, he appeared in an episode of The Golden Girls as a prospective love interest for Dorothy. He is also known for having played Herbert Purcell, a businessman and leader of a local Ku Klux Klan chapter, in a 1981 episode of The Jeffersons; and the evil tycoon Nathan Lassiter, who killed the town of Walnut Grove in the final TV movie of Little House on the Prairie. Karen was a lifelong member of The Actors Studio. Karen's other notable film credits include The China Syndrome and Oliver Stone's Wall Street.

Perhaps his best known roles were in the low-budget horror comedy The Return of the Living Dead, where Karen starred as the manager of a medical warehouse who inadvertently releases a gas that re-animates the dead, and in Poltergeist (1982) where he played real-estate developer Teague, who built the California planned community of Cuesta Verde on top of a former cemetery. In a 2006 interview about his role in The Return of the Living Dead, Karen noted that he helped write most scenes for his character: “It was the deal where he figures out he’s becoming a zombie and decides to incinerate himself in the crematorium...He kisses his wedding ring as he goes in. It was a very emotional scene, but it also got me out of being one of the rain-drenched zombies milling around outside the place at the end of the film. I didn't really want to do all that muddy stuff".

Karen was set to appear in Superman Returns (2006) as Ben Hubbard, but his scenes were ultimately cut. Later in his career, Karen was recognized for his role as Martin Frohm in the 2006 film The Pursuit of Happyness. His final film roles were in the low-budget films Bender (2016), directed by John Alexander, and Cynthia (2018).

== Personal life and death ==
He was married to Susan Reed, the actress and folk singer, with whom he had one son, Reed. Reed's godfather was Buster Keaton, Karen's good friend. Karen and Reed divorced in 1967. He married Alba Francesca in 1986.

Karen died on October 23, 2018, at his home in Los Angeles, at the age of 94.

The dedication of James Curtis’s 2022 biography Buster Keaton: A Filmmaker's Life reads “In memory of James Karen.”

In 2026, Karen was announced as a posthumous inductee into the Luzerne County Arts & Entertainment Hall of Fame.

== Selected filmography ==
- Sources:
- Film (1965, Short) as Passerby
- Frankenstein Meets the Space Monster (1965) as Dr. Adam Steele
- Hercules in New York (1970) as Professor Camden
- I Never Sang for My Father (1970) as Old Age Home Director
- Sit Down, Shut Up, or Get Out (1971) as Mr. Newman
- Rivals (1972) as Child Psychiatrist
- Amazing Grace (1974) as Mr. Annenberg
- All the President's Men (1976) as Hugh Sloan's Lawyer
- Something for Joey (1977, TV Movie) as Dr. Wingreen
- Mary Jane Harper Cried Last Night (1977, TV Movie) as Dr. Sutterman
- The Gathering (1977, TV Movie) as Bob Block
- Capricorn One (1978) as Vice President Price
- Opening Night (1977) as Bellboy
- F.I.S.T. (1978) as Mr. Andrews
- Institute for Revenge (1979, TV Movie) as Power Broker
- The China Syndrome (1979) as Mac Churchill
- The Jazz Singer (1980) as Barney Callahan
- Take This Job and Shove It (1981) as Loomis
- Poltergeist (1982) as Mr. Teague
- Time Walker (1982) as Dr. Wendell J. Rossmore
- Frances (1982) as Judge Hillier
- Kiss Me Goodbye (1982) as Lawyer (uncredited)
- Sam's Son (1984) as Mr. Collins
- The Boy Who Loved Trolls (1984, TV Movie) as Richman
- Little House: The Last Farewell (1984, TV Movie) as Nathan Lassiter
- The Return of the Living Dead (1985) as Frank Johnson
- Jagged Edge (1985) as Andrew Hardesty
- Invaders from Mars (1986) as General Climet Wilson
- Hardbodies 2 (1986) as Logan
- Billionaire Boys Club (1987, TV Movie) as Mr. Fairmont Sr.
- Wall Street (1987) as Mr. Lynch
- Return of the Living Dead Part II (1988) as Ed Mathews
- Girlfriend from Hell (1989) as Carl's Dad
- Vital Signs (1990) as Dean of Students
- Road Lawyers and Other Briefs (1990) as Judge Bowelmore (segment "Road Lawyers")
- The Willies (1990) as Uncle Harry / Mr. Jenkins
- The Closer (1990) as Ned Randall
- Heart of the Deal (1990)
- The Unborn (1991) as Dr. Richard Meyerling
- Stone Soup (1993) as Paul
- Future Shock (1994) as Kafka
- Revenge of the Nerds IV: Nerds in Love (1994, TV Movie) as Mylan Whitfield
- Congo (1995) as College President, Elliot's Boss
- Piranha (1995) as Governor
- Nixon (1995) as Bill Rogers
- Up Close & Personal (1996) as Tom Orr
- Behind Enemy Lines (1997) as TV Reporter
- Always Say Goodbye (1997) as William Tager
- Joyride (1997) as The Client
- A River Made to Drown In (1997) as Ray
- Freedom Strike (1998) as President Mitchell
- Shadow of Doubt (1998) as Norman Calloway
- Girl (1998) as Dad
- Apt Pupil (1999) as Victor Bowden
- One Last Flight (1999) as Gramps
- My Last Love (1999) as Phil Morton
- Any Given Sunday (1999) as Christina's Advisor / Ed
- Thirteen Days (2000) as George Ball
- Mulholland Drive (2001) as Wally Brown
- A House on a Hill (2003) as Sy
- Unscripted (2005, TV Series) as Dante's Friend
- Superman Returns (2006) as Ben Hubbard (Scenes Deleted)
- Outlaw Trail: The Treasure of Butch Cassidy (2006) as Leroy Parker
- The Pursuit of Happyness (2006) as Martin Frohm
- Trail of the Screaming Forehead (2007) as Reverend Beaks
- Dark and Stormy Night (2009) as Seyton Ethelquake
- Jack and the Beanstalk (2009) as Verri Saddius
- Sympathy for Delicious (2010) as Father Rohn
- The Butterfly Room (2012) as Taxidermist
- Ambush at Dark Canyon (2012) as Seymour Redfield
- America's Most Haunted (2013) as Ralph George
- Rain from Stars (2013) as Spencer
- Bender (2016) as Old Man Bender
- Confessions of a Teenage Jesus Jerk (2017) as Interviewee No. 1
- Cynthia (2018) as Frank Teague

== Awards ==
Karen was nominated for a Saturn Award for Best Actor for his role in The Return of the Living Dead in 1985. For his contributions to the horror film industry, Karen received an honorary Saturn Award in 1998. He was nominated for a Fangoria Chainsaw Awards for Best Supporting Actor for his role in The Unborn in 1991.
