= Jim Beaver =

American actor (born 1950)

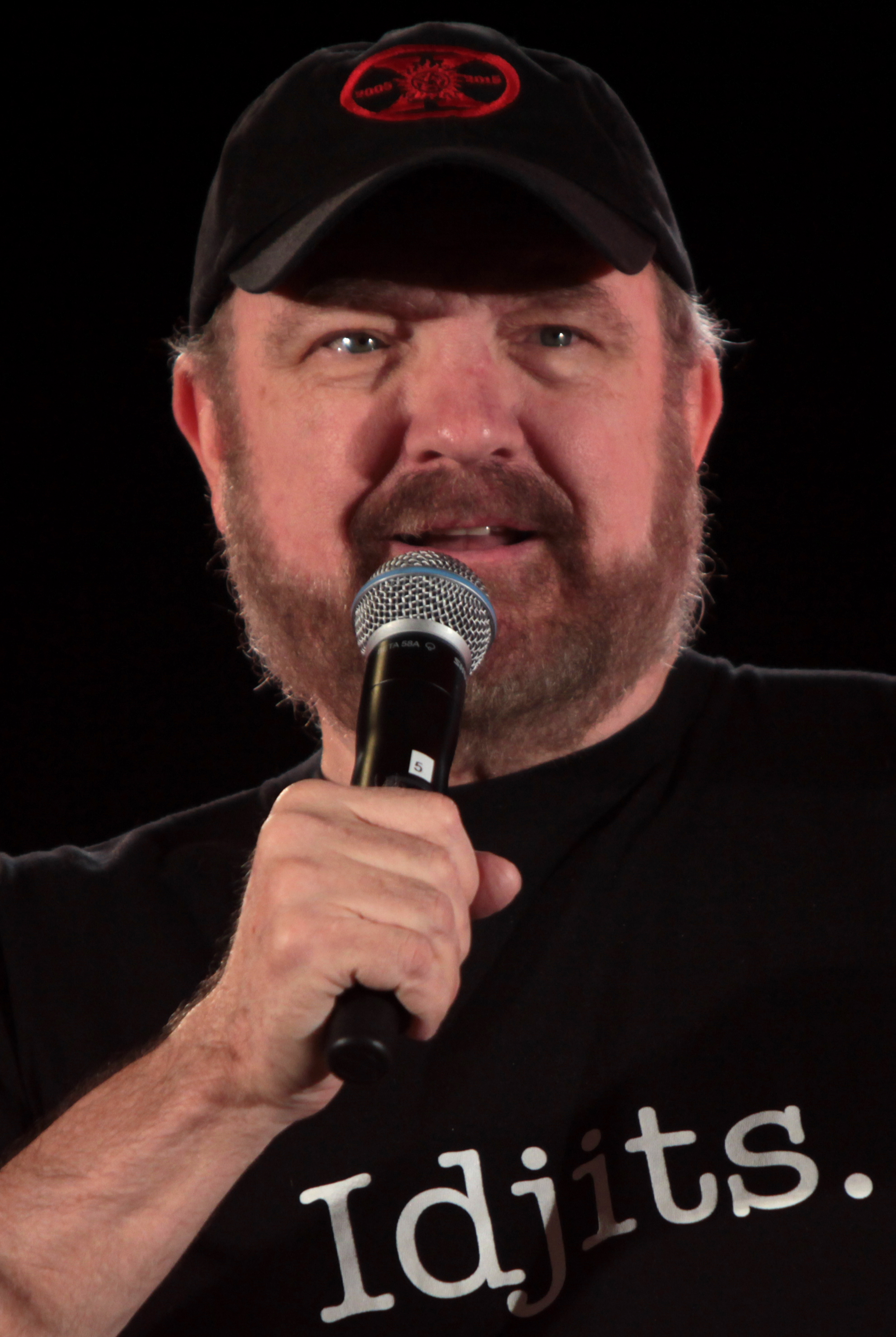
- Beaver in 2015
- Born: James Norman Beaver Jr. August 12, 1950 (age 76); Laramie, Wyoming, U.S.
- Occupations: Actor; writer; film historian
- Years active: 1972–present
- Spouses: Debbie Young (m. 1973; div. 1976) Cecily Adams (m. 1989; died 2004) Sarah Spiegel (m. 2019; div. 2024)
- Children: 1

James Norman Beaver Jr. (born August 12, 1950) is an American actor, writer, and film historian. He portrayed Bobby Singer in Supernatural. He also played Whitney Ellsworth on the HBO Western drama series Deadwood, which brought him acclaim and a Screen Actors Guild Awards nomination for Ensemble Acting, Sheriff Shelby Parlow on the FX series Justified, and Robert "Dakota Bob" Singer on the Amazon Prime Video series The Boys. He appeared in starring roles in two films directed by Guillermo del Toro, Crimson Peak and Nightmare Alley. His memoir Life's That Way was published in April 2009.

== Early life ==
Beaver was born in Laramie, Wyoming, the son of Dorothy Adell (née Crawford) and James Norman Beaver, a minister. His father was of English and French heritage; the family name was originally de Beauvoir, and Beaver is a distant cousin of author and philosopher Simone de Beauvoir and Pennsylvania governor General James A. Beaver. Beaver's mother has Cherokee, German, and Scottish ancestry, and is a descendant of three-time U.S. Attorney General John J. Crittenden.

Although his parents' families had both long been in Texas, Beaver was born in Laramie, as his father was doing graduate work in accounting at the University of Wyoming. Returning to Texas, Beaver Sr. worked as an accountant and as a minister for the Church of Christ in Fort Worth, Crowley, Dallas, and Grapevine. For most of Beaver's youth, his family lived in Irving, Texas, even while his father preached in surrounding communities. He and his three younger sisters (Denise, Reneé, and Teddlie) all attended Irving High School, where he was a classmate of ZZ Top drummer Frank Beard, but he transferred in his senior year to Fort Worth Christian Academy, from which he graduated in 1968. He also took courses at Fort Worth Christian College. Later, he attended Oklahoma Christian College. Despite having appeared in some elementary school plays, he showed no particular interest in an acting career, but immersed himself in film history and expressed a desire for a career as a writer, publishing a few short stories in his high school anthology.

== Military service and education ==
Fewer than two months after his graduation from high school, Beaver followed several of his close friends into the United States Marine Corps. Following basic training at Marine Corps Recruit Depot San Diego, Beaver was trained there as a microwave radio relay technician. He served at Marine Corps Base Twentynine Palms and at Marine Corps Base Camp Pendleton before being transferred to the 1st Marine Division near Da Nang, South Vietnam in 1970. He served as a radio operator at an outlying detachment of the 1st Marine Regiment, then as supply chief for the division communications company. He returned to the U.S. in 1971 and was discharged as a Corporal (E-4), though he remained active in the Marine Reserve until 1976.

Upon his release from active duty in 1971, Beaver returned to Irving, and worked briefly for Frito-Lay as a corn-chip dough mixer. He entered what is now Oklahoma Christian University, where he became interested in theatre. He made his true theatrical debut in a small part in The Miracle Worker. The following year, he transferred to Central State University (now known as the University of Central Oklahoma). He performed in numerous plays in college and supported himself as a cabdriver, a movie projectionist, a tennis-club maintenance man, and an amusement-park stuntman at Frontier City. He also worked as a newscaster and hosted jazz and classical music programs on radio station KCSC. During his college days, he also began to write, completing several plays as well as his first book, on actor John Garfield, while still a student. Beaver graduated with a degree in oral communications in 1975. He briefly pursued graduate studies, but soon returned to Irving, Texas.

== Career ==
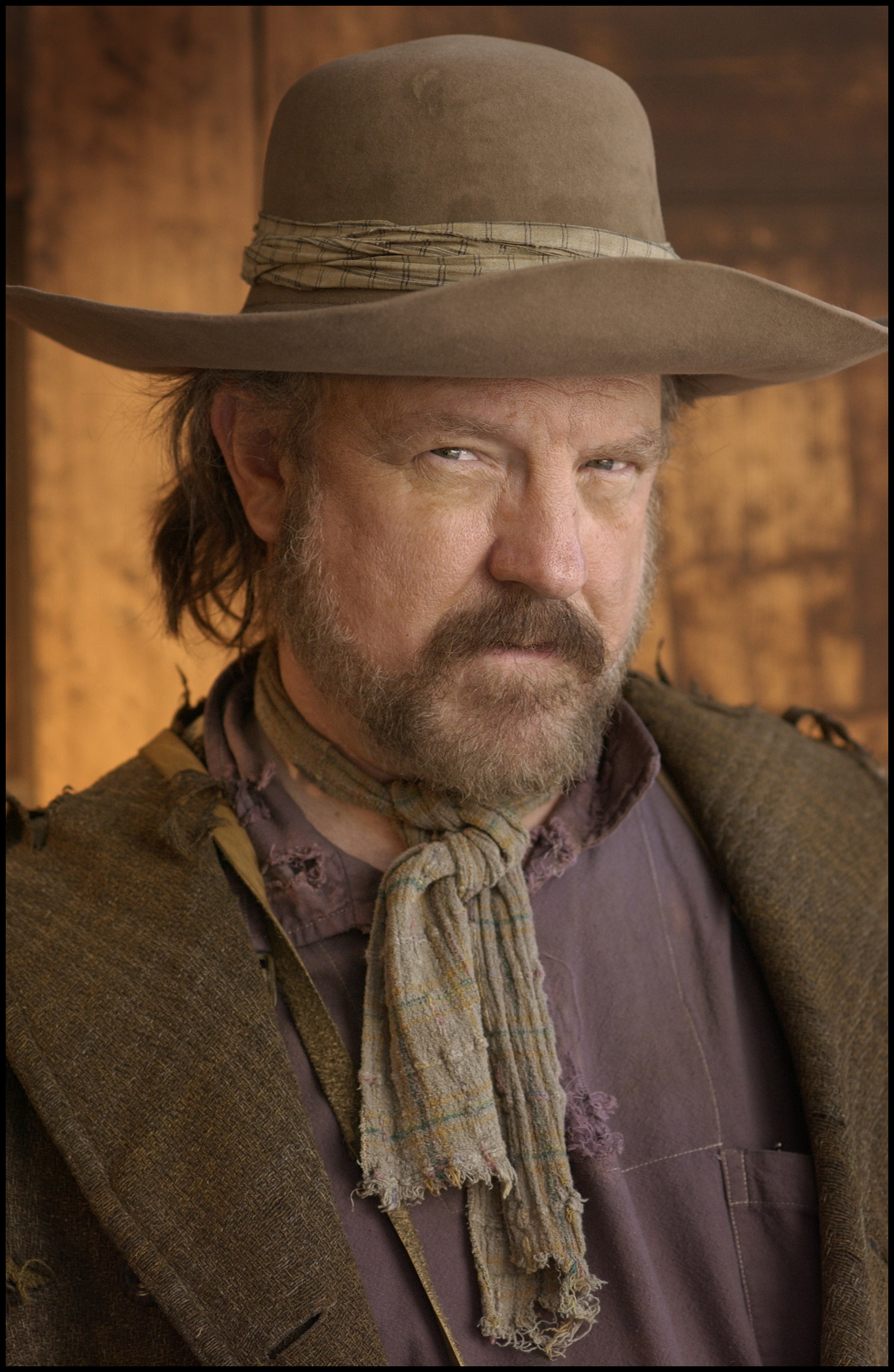
Beaver as his Whitney Ellsworth character in Deadwood

Beaver made his professional stage debut in October 1972, while still a college student, in Rain, from W. Somerset Maugham's short story, at the Oklahoma Theatre Center in Oklahoma City, Oklahoma. After returning to Texas, he performed extensively in local theatre in the Dallas area, supporting himself as a film cleaner at a 16 mm film rental firm and as a stagehand for the Dallas Ballet. He joined the Shakespeare Festival of Dallas in 1976, performing in numerous productions. In 1979, he was commissioned by Actors Theatre of Louisville to write the first of three plays for that company (Spades, Sidekick and Semper Fi), and was twice a finalist in the theatre's national Great American Play Contest (for Once Upon a Single Bound and Verdigris). Along with plays, he continued writing for film journals and for several years was a columnist, critic, and feature writer for the National Board of Review of Motion Pictures magazine Films in Review.

Moving to New York City in 1979, Beaver worked steadily onstage in stock and on tour, simultaneously writing plays and researching a biography of actor George Reeves. He continues to pursue this project between acting jobs. He appeared in starring roles in such plays as The Hasty Heart and The Rainmaker in Birmingham, Alabama, and The Lark in Manchester, New Hampshire, and toured the country as Macduff in Macbeth and in The Last Meeting of the Knights of the White Magnolia. During this period, he ghostwrote the book Movie Blockbusters for critic Steven Scheuer.

In 1983, he moved to Los Angeles, California, to continue research on his biography of George Reeves. He worked for a year as the film archivist for the Variety Arts Center. Following a reading of his play Verdigris, he was asked to join the prestigious Theatre West company in Hollywood, where he continues as an actor and playwright to this day. Verdigris was produced to positive reviews in 1985 and Beaver was signed by the Triad Artists agency. He immediately began to work writing episodes of television series including Alfred Hitchcock Presents (he received a 1987 CableACE Award nomination for his very first TV script for this show), Tour of Duty and Vietnam War Story. He also worked occasionally in small roles in films and television.

The 1988 Writers Guild of America strike fundamentally altered the freelance television writing market, and Beaver's television writing career came to an abrupt halt. A chance meeting led to his being cast as the best friend of star Bruce Willis in Norman Jewison's drama about Vietnam veterans, In Country, and his acting career began flourishing where his writing career had faltered. Beaver was the only actual Vietnam veteran among the principal cast of In Country.

Subsequently, he has appeared in many popular films, including Sister Act, Sliver, Bad Girls, Adaptation., Magnolia, and The Life of David Gale. He starred in the television series Thunder Alley as the comic sidekick to Ed Asner, and as homicide cop Earl Gaddis on Reasonable Doubts. He was also French Stewart's sullen boss Happy Doug on the sitcom 3rd Rock from the Sun.

In 2002, Beaver was cast as one of the stars of the ensemble Western drama Deadwood in the role of Whitney Ellsworth, a goldminer whom he often described as "Gabby Hayes with Tourette syndrome". Ellsworth went from being a filth-covered reprobate to marrying the richest woman in town and becoming a beloved and stalwart figure in the community. Originally Ellsworth did not have a first name, but when it became necessary to provide one, Beaver requested he be named Whitney Ellsworth, after the producer of George Reeves's Adventures of Superman. He continued his long research for the Reeves biography, and in 2005 served as the historical and biographical consultant on the theatrical feature film about Reeves's death, Hollywoodland.

Beaver joined the cast of the HBO drama John from Cincinnati in 2006, while simultaneously playing the recurring roles of Bobby Singer on Supernatural and Carter Reese on another HBO drama Big Love, appearing at least once a season on Supernatural. He then took on the role of Sheriff Charlie Mills in the CBS drama Harper's Island. He recurred as the gun dealer Lawson on Breaking Bad and its prequel Better Call Saul, and played Sheriff Shelby Parlow for three seasons on FX's Justified.

Following his acclaimed work in Justified, Beaver had a starring role in Guillermo del Toro's gothic ghost story feature film, Crimson Peak, in a part del Toro wrote for him. He also had roles in the feature films The Frontier and Billy Boy.

His memoir about the year after his wife's 2003 lung cancer diagnosis, titled Life's That Way, was purchased in a preemptive bid by Putnam/Penguin publishers in the fall of 2007. Prior to publication in April, 2009, it was chosen for the Barnes & Noble Discover Great New Writers program for 2009.

His performance in The Silence of Bees won him the Best Actor Award at the 2010 New York Film and Video Festival.

Beaver was nominated for Best Guest Performance in a Drama by the Broadcast Television Journalists' Association Critics' Choice Awards in 2013, for his performance as Sheriff Shelby Parlow on Justified.

He wrote and directed the short film Night Riders (2013), based upon his play of the same title.

In 2014, he was given the Lifetime Merit Award of the Idyllwild International Festival of Cinema.

Beaver studied acting with Clyde Ventura and Academy Award-winning actor Maximilian Schell.

In March 2015, Theatre West presented a 30th anniversary revival of Beaver's play Verdigris, with Beaver in a starring role.

Actress Maureen Stapleton played the leading role in a workshop of Beaver's play Verdigris in 1985 at the Berkshire Theatre Festival. In June, 2016, Beaver returned to the Festival to play Big Daddy in Tennessee Williams's Cat on a Hot Tin Roof.

Since 2018, Beaver has portrayed Secretary of Defense/U.S. presidential candidate/U.S. President Robert "Dakota Bob" Singer on the Amazon series The Boys, produced by Eric Kripke, creator of Supernatural. Beaver's characters on The Boys and Supernatural share the same name.

In March 2023, he reprised his role as Bobby Singer in The Winchesters spinoff series.

Beaver was awarded the 2023 Soaring Talent Award for Career Achievement by the Tallgrass Film Festival.

In addition to his film and television work, Beaver has, as of mid-2025, appeared in over 110 stage productions.

In September, 2014, Beaver announced that he had been made a member of the Cherokee Elders Council.

== Personal life ==
For several years after his 1983 move to California, Beaver shared a house with character actor Hank Worden, whom he considered a close friend and surrogate grandfather. He became friends with Worden as a child, after writing him a fan letter that sparked a lengthy correspondence between them.

During college, Beaver married a fellow student, Debbie Young, in August 1973. They separated four months later but did not divorce until 1976.

In 1989, after four years of dating, Beaver married actress and casting director Cecily Adams, daughter of comic actor and voiceover artist Don Adams. Their daughter Madeline was born in 2001. (She now portrays the lead character in the video game Ava.) Adams, though a non-smoker, died of lung cancer on March 3, 2004.

Beaver began a relationship in 2016 with actress and singer Sarah Spiegel. They were married on June 20, 2019. Beaver filed for divorce from Spiegel on August 24, 2022, citing irreconcilable differences. Their divorce was final on January 23, 2024.

== Filmography ==
=== Film ===
Year	Title	Role	Notes
1977	Semi-Tough	B.E.A.T. Member	Uncredited
1978	The Seniors	Client	Uncredited
1979	Warnings	The Artist	Short film
1981	Nighthawks	Subway Passenger	Uncredited
1983	Girls of the White Orchid	Pedestrian	Uncredited; alternative title Death Ride to Osaka
1983	Silkwood	Plant Manager	Uncredited
1985	File 8022	Ben Crysler	
1987	Sweet Revenge	Smuggler	Uncredited
1987	Hollywood Shuffle	Postal Worker	
1988	Two Idiots in Hollywood	Crying Man	
1988	Defense Play	FBI Agent	
1989	Mergers & Acquisitions	Gabby Hayes	Short film
1989	Turner & Hooch	Plant Manager	
1989	The Cherry	The Captain	Short film
1989	In Country	Earl Smith	
1990	El Diablo	Spivey Irick	
1990	The Court-Martial of Jackie Robinson	Major Trimble	
1991	Little Secrets	Liquor Store Cashier	Credited as Richard Muldoon
1992	Sister Act	Detective Clarkson	
1993	Sliver	Detective Ira	
1993	Geronimo: An American Legend	Proclamation Officer	
1994	Twogether	Oscar	
1994	Blue Chips	Ricky's Father	
1994	Children of the Dark	Roddy Gibbons	Deliberately uncredited
1994	Bad Girls	Pinkerton Detective Graves	
1997	Wounded	Agent Eric Ashton	
1998	At Sachem Farm	Foreman	
1999	Impala	Sheriff Bert Davis	Short film
1999	Ah! Silenciosa	Ambrose Bierce	Short film
1999	Magnolia	Smiling Peanut Patron #1	
2000	Fraud	Detective Mason	Short film
2000	Where the Heart Is	'Clawhammer'	Scenes deleted
2001	Joy Ride	Sheriff Ritter	
2002	Wheelmen	Agent Hammond	
2002	Adaptation.	Ranger Tony	
2003	The Life of David Gale	Duke Grover	
2003	Wave Babes	Amos Nandy	
2003	The Commission	Howard L. Brennan	
2007	Next	FBI Director Wisdom	
2007	Cooties	The Man	Short film
2008	Reflections	Frank	Short film
2008	The Silence of Bees	Parker Lam	Short film
2009	Dark and Stormy Night	Jack Tugdon	
2011	The Legend of Hell's Gate: An American Conspiracy	J. Wright Mooar	
2013	Night Riders		Short film; writer, director, executive producer
2015	The Frontier	Lee	
2015	Crimson Peak	Carter Cushing	
2016	Injection	Pops	
2017	Billy Boy	Crabtree	
2017	Remember The Sultana	Joseph Taylor Elliott / First Engineering Officer Nathaniel Wintringer	
2017	The Angry River	Jacob Alsea	
2018	Hospitality	"The Boss"	
2019	Mama Bear	Doctor	
2020	Blindfire	Sergeant Ward	
2021	Nightmare Alley	Sheriff Jedediah Judd	
2021	Liberty	Stace Lamott	
2021	Teddy	Theodore Roosevelt	
2025	No More Time	The Radio Host	
2024	Rock and Doris (Try to) Write a Movie	Mayor Astor Cargan	
2026	Chimera	Ben	
2026	Greg's Going to Rehab	Gus	
2026	What Was Planned	George	

=== Television ===
Year	Title	Role	Notes
1978	Desperado	Nathan	TV film
1978–1979	Dallas	Diner / Julie's Gardener	2 episodes
1979	Dallas Cowboys Cheerleaders	Cowboy Player	TV film
1986	Divorce Court	Wrench McCoy	
1987	Jake and the Fatman	Defense Attorney	Episode: "Fatal Attraction"
1988	Matlock	Barney Sutler	Episode: "The Umpire"
1988	Paradise	Frank Foster	Episode: "The Holstered Gun"
1988	Perry Mason: The Case of the Lady in the Lake	Motel Manager	TV film
1989	CBS Summer Playhouse	Wrong House Neighbor	Episode: "Elysian Fields"
1989	The Young Riders	Johnson	Episode: "The Kid"
1989	Mothers, Daughters and Lovers	Sheriff Jack Edzard	TV film
1990	Follow Your Heart	Craig Hraboy	TV film
1990	Midnight Caller	Tom Barlow	Episode: "Ryder on the Storm"
1990	Nasty Boys	Wetstone	Episode: "Desert Run"
1990	Father Dowling Mysteries	Drake	Episode: "The Murder Weekend Mystery"
1991–1993	Santa Barbara	Andy, The Rapist / Motel Man	5 episodes
1991–1993	Reasonable Doubts	Detective Earl Gaddis	13 episodes
1992	Gunsmoke: To the Last Man	Deputy Willie Rudd	TV film
1993	Lois & Clark: The New Adventures of Superman	Henry Barnes	Episode: "I'm Looking Through You"
1993	Gunsmoke: The Long Ride	Traveling blacksmith	TV film
1994-1995	Thunder Alley	Leland DuParte	28 episodes
1995	Home Improvement	Duke Miller	Episode: "Doctor in the House"
1995	Unsolved Mysteries	Himself	Episode: "Who Killed Superman?"
1996	High Incident	Father In Wreck	Episode: "Women & Children First"
1996–1997	Murder One	Donald Cleary	2 episodes
1996	Bone Chillers	Edgar Allan Poe	Episode: "Edgar Allan Poe-Session"
1996–2004	Days of Our Lives	Father Timothy Jansen	26 episodes
1997	NYPD Blue	Truck Driver / Jesus Christ	Episode: "Taillight's Last Gleaming"
1997	Moloney	Detective Ashton	Episode: "The Ripple Effect"
1997	Spy Game	Thornbush	Episode: "Lorne and Max Drop the Ball"
1997	Total Security	Detective McKissick	Episode: "Das Bootie"
1997	Divided by Hate	Danny Leland	TV film
1998	Melrose Place	Ranger Virgil	Episode: "Amanda's Back"
1998	Pensacola: Wings of Gold	Actor	Episode: "Power Play"
1998	Mr. Murder	Agent Jason Reiling	TV film
1998–1999	E! Mysteries & Scandals	Himself	2 episodes
1998–1999	3rd Rock from the Sun	Doug 'Happy Doug'	7 episodes
1999	The X-Files	Coroner	Episode: "Field Trip"
2000	Biography	Himself	Episode: "George Reeves: The Perils of a Superhero"
2000	The Trouble with Normal	Gary	8 episodes
2001	That '70s Show	Tony	Episode: "Who Wants It More?"
2001	The Division	Fred Zito	Episode: "High on the Hog"
2001	Star Trek: Enterprise	Admiral Daniel Leonard	Episode: "Broken Bow: Part 1"
2001	The West Wing	Carl	Episode: "Manchester: Part 1"
2001	Philly	Nelson Vanderhoff	Episode: "Loving Sons"
2001	Warden of Red Rock	Jefferson Bent	TV film
2003	Andy Richter Controls the Universe	Craig	Episode: "Charity Begins in Cellblock D"
2003	Six Feet Under	Prison Officer	Episode: "Twilight"
2003	Tremors	Sheriff Sam Boggs	Episode: "Water Hazard"
2003	The Lyon's Den	Hank Ferris	Episode: "The Other Side of Caution"
2004	Monk	Sheriff Mathis	Episode: "Mr. Monk Gets Married"
2004	Crossing Jordan	Ranger Diggory	Episode: "Revealed"
2004–2006	Deadwood	Whitney Ellsworth	28 episodes
2006	The Unit	Lloyd Cole	Episode: "Manhunt"
2006	CSI: Crime Scene Investigation	Stanley Tanner	2 episodes
2006–2020	Supernatural	Bobby Singer	69 episodes
2007	Day Break	Nick 'Uncle Nick' Vukovic	5 episodes
2007	John from Cincinnati	Joe 'Vietnam Joe'	8 episodes
2007	Big Love	Carter Reese	3 episodes
2007	Criminal Minds	Sheriff Williams	Episode: "Identify"
2009	Harper's Island	Sheriff Charlie Mills	11 episodes
2009	Psych	Pete 'Stinky Pete' Dillingham	Episode: "High Noon-ish"
2010	Law & Order: LA	Frank Loomis	Episode: "Hollywood"
2010	The Mentalist	Cobb Holwell	Episode: "The Red Ponies"
2010	Lie to Me	Gus	Episode: "Veronica"
2010	Love Bites	Trucker	Episode: "Keep On Truckin'"
2011–2012	Breaking Bad	Lawson	2 episodes
2011–2013	Justified	Sheriff Shelby Parlow	14 episodes
2012	Dexter	Clint McKay	Episode: "The Dark...Whatever"
2013	The Middle	Mr. Stokes	Episode: "Dollar Days"
2013	Mike & Molly	Dwight	2 episodes
2013	Longmire	Lee Roskey	Episode: "Natural Order"
2013	Revolution	John Franklin Fry	2 episodes
2014	Major Crimes	Donald Beckwith	Episode: "Return to Sender Part 2"
2014	NCIS	Captain Tom O'Rourke	Episode: "The San Dominick"
2015–2017	The New Adventures of Peter and Wendy	George Darling	Web series
2016	Better Call Saul	Lawson	2 episodes; Same character from Breaking Bad
2016	Bones	George Gibbons	Episode: "The Monster in the Closet"
2017	NCIS: New Orleans	Jackson Hauser, Rig Manager	Episode: "Hell on the High Water"
2017	Timeless	Jake Neville	3 episodes
2017	Criminal Minds: Beyond Borders	Donald Atwood	Episode: "Blowback"
2017	Shut Eye	Bob Caygeon	2 episodes
2017–2019	The Ranch	Chuck Phillips	12 episodes
2019–2026	The Boys	Robert A. "Dakota Bob" Singer	11 episodes
2019	Watchmen	Andy	Episode: "Martial Feats of Comanche Horsemanship"
2020	Young Sheldon	Kenneth	Episode: "Contracts, Rules and a Little Bit of Pig Brains"
2021	B Positive	Spencer Williams	Recurring role; 14 episodes
2023	The Winchesters	Bobby Singer	Episode: "Hey, That's No Way To Say Goodbye"; Same character from Supernatural
2024	Outer Range	Harrison Farber	Episode: "Ode to Joy"
2025	Night Visions	The Wizard	

=== Online ===
Year	Title	Role	Notes
2021	Vought News Network: Seven on 7 with Cameron Coleman	Robert "Dakota Bob" Singer (voice)	Guest role; web series promoting The Boys

== Literary works ==
=== Books ===
- John Garfield: His Life and Films (1978)
- Movie Blockbusters (with Steven Scheuer) (1982, revised edition 1983)
- Life's That Way: A Memoir (2009)
- The Oliver Stone Experience (2016) by Matt Zoller Seitz; (contributing essayist)

=== Fiction ===
- The Afternoon Blood Show, Alfred Hitchcock's Mystery Magazine, April 29, 1981
- Blood Show, Nawyecka Productions, 2024. (Novella, a revision of the story The Afternoon Blood Show)

=== Plays ===
- The Cop and the Anthem (adapted from the short story by O. Henry) (1973)
- Once Upon a Single Bound (1974)
- As You Like It, or Anything You Want To, Also Known as Rotterdam and Parmesan Are Dead (1975)
- The Ox-Bow Incident (adapted from the novel by Walter Van Tilburg Clark) (1978)
- Spades (1979)
- Sidekick (1981)
- Semper Fi (1984)
- Verdigris (1985)
- Truth, Justice, and the Texican Way (1986)
- Pressing Engagements (1990)
- Mockingbird (2003)
- Night Riders (2006)
- The American Way (2011)
- Whigs, Pigs, and Greyhounds (2011)
- Lettering (2013)
- Marmeladov (2026)

=== Magazine articles ===
- "John Wayne", Films in Review, May 1977
- "George Raft", Films in Review, April 1978
- "John Carradine", Films in Review, October 1979
- "James Stewart", Films in Review, October 1980
- "Steve McQueen", Films in Review, August–September 1981
- "Frank Perry", Films in Review, November 1981
- "Strother Martin", Films in Review, November 1982
- "Ad Glib" (regular column). Films in Review, November 1981 – December 1983
