= Trail of the Screaming Forehead =

- Original theatrical lobby card release poster
- Directed by: Larry Blamire
- Written by: Larry Blamire
- Produced by: Larry Blamire
- Starring: Larry Blamire
- Cinematography: Kevin F. Jones
- Edited by: Bill Bryn Russell
- Production company: Rangeland Productions
- Distributed by: IFC Films
- Release date: June 8, 2007 (Seattle)
- Running time: 88 minutes
- Country: United States
- Language: English

Trail of the Screaming Forehead is a 2007 American science fiction comedy film written by, directed by and starring Larry Blamire.

== Plot ==
In the quiet little town of Longhead Bay, something sinister is afoot - crawling alien forehead parasites that take over people's bodies! But while all that is going on, Dr. Sheila Baxter, convinced that the center of independent thought is not the brain, but the forehead, starts experimenting on her colleague Dr. Philip Latham (whom he also has an affair with). In the meantime, two sailors who have arrived in town, Big Dan Frater and Dutch "The Swede" Annacrombie, strike up a friendship with librarian Millie Healey, and start to notice the increasingly strange activities of the townsfolk, who are quickly taken over by the foreheads. After they encounter a crawling forehead and squash it, they report it to the police but get ignored. Sheila strikes a deal with local hoodlum Nick Vassidine to get a supply of more foreheads for her experiment. Nick's moll and local bar singer Droxy Chapelle seduces a drunk Big Dan, and get him to open the freezer where his boat's cargo - human cadavers ferried for medical research - are stored, and steal their foreheads. A now suspicious Chief Bartnett questions Nick, but is then taken over by a forehead. In the meantime, Dr. Philip finds his forehead growing as a result of the experiment. Dr. Applethorpe, who is already taken over by a forehead, mistakes Philip for one of their own, and invites them to their secret meeting, where the aliens try to come up with a way to disguise their bulging foreheads, eventually settling for little hats with veils. The three friends look for a book on foreheads in the library, but a forehead attaches itself to Millie. They free her and tie up the forehead, which tells them its story - their race came from a planet devastated by nuclear war "similar to your Earth, except different." They now want to take over human bodies as hosts. The three take the forehead to the police, only to find the Chief being one of the aliens and chased away. Philip confesses his infidelity to his wife, Mary, but continues with the experiments, turning into a horrific monster with a giant forehead, and running away screaming. Sheila, Nick and Droxy are also taken over by foreheads. Millie finds information in a book that various sound frequencies hurt foreheads, and she and the sailors arm themselves with bells, successfully repelling the attacking "bubbleheads". However, the aliens return with earplugs and capture them, until Philip returns, and sacrifices himself by setting off the fire alarm which knocks out the possessed people but also kills Philip. The movie ends with an after-credits scene of a remaining forehead crawling into a prop rocket, swearing revenge

== Cast ==
- Brian Howe as Big Dan Frater
- Dan Conroy as Dutch "The Swede" Annacrombie
- Andrew Parks as Dr. Philip Latham
- Fay Masterson as Dr. Sheila Bexter
- Alison Martin as Millie Healey
- Jennifer Blaire as Droxy Chappelle
- Larry Blamire as Nick Vassidine
- Betty Garrett as Mrs. Cuttle
- Dick Miller as Eddie
- Daniel Roebuck as Amos
- Susan McConnell as Sarah
- H.M. Wynant as Dr. Applethorpe
- Trish Geiger as Mary Latham
- Robert Deveau as Chief Bartnett
- James Karen as Reverend Beaks
- Kevin McCarthy as Latecomer
