= Dark and Stormy Night =

- Directed by: Larry Blamire
- Written by: Larry Blamire
- Produced by: James N. Perry, Jr., Trish Geiger
- Starring: Larry Blamire; Jennifer Blaire; Brian Howe; Fay Masterson; Jim Beaver; Dan Conroy; Daniel Roebuck
- Cinematography: Anthony J. Rickert-Epstein
- Edited by: Bill Bryn Russell
- Music by: Christopher Caliendo
- Distributed by: Shout! Factory
- Release date: January 16, 2009 (Palm Springs)
- Running time: 93 minutes
- Country: United States
- Language: English
- Budget: $1 million

Dark and Stormy Night is a 2009 independent film spoofing the haunted house and murder mystery films produced by Hollywood in the 1930s and 1940s. Larry Blamire directed and acted in the film and wrote the screenplay. The film also includes many cast members from Blamire's previous films (such as The Lost Skeleton of Cadavra and Trail of the Screaming Forehead).

The title refers to the often-parodied opening sentence from the novel Paul Clifford by Edward Bulwer-Lytton.

== Plot ==
On a dark and stormy night in the 1930s, a number of people gather at an isolated country estate to hear the reading of the will of the wealthy Sinas Cavinder, including: wealthy nephew Burling Famish Jr. (Brian Howe) and his wife Pristy (Christine Romeo); Pristy's dim-witted lover Teak Armbruster (Kevin Quinn); big-game hunter Jack Tugdon (Jim Beaver); the foppish Lord Partfine (Andrew Parks); elderly Mrs. Hausenstout (Betty Garrett); kindly Seyton Ethelquake (James Karen); and the fragile Sabasha Fanmoore (Fay Masterson), Cavinder's ward.

They are joined by rival reporters Eight O'Clock Faraday (Daniel Roebuck) and Billy Tuesday (Jennifer Blaire) along with cab driver Happy Codburn (Dan Conroy), to whom Faraday owes "toity-five cents" (not including tip). The party grows by two when psychic Mrs. Cupcupboard (Allison Martin) and "stranded motorist" Ray Vestinhaus (Larry Blamire) arrive unexpectedly.

The large group gathers in the home's parlor so that lawyer Farper Twyly (Mark Redfield) can read the will. Before Twyly begins, the guests note the unusual threats surrounding the estate: Sabasha has been the subject of mysterious death threats; a serial killer known as the "Cavinder Strangler" is still at large and in the area; and it happens to be the same night on which the 300-year-old ghost of Sarah Cavinder is supposed to return.

Twyly reads the will, revealing that some characters receive trivial gifts and other substantial ones. The bulk of the estate is given to Sabasha, but with the clause that upon her death the estate would then be given to Burling. Twyly then reveals the existence of an additional letter that amends the will; he discovers that it has been stolen, but assures the group that he and only he knows the contents. Before he can recite the letter, the lights are turned off. When they are turned back on, the group discovers that Twyly has been stabbed to death.

When Ray tells the group that the only bridge back to town collapsed behind him, Faraday and Tuesday suggest that they all wait until morning for the police to arrive. However, at the stroke of midnight, Pristy is strangled by a masked killer. Dr. Van Von Vandervon (H.M. Wynant) arrives and announces that he's tracked an escaped lunatic to the house, but because of the nature of his work (in which the therapist and patient never see each other), he is not sure what the patient looks like, or even if it's a man or woman.

Over the course of the evening, the group attempts to find both the letter and clues leading to the killer. A seance is held by Mrs. Cupcupboard, but the spirit (Marvin Kaplan) is of no help. Mrs. Hausenstout occasionally pops up with a gorilla (Bob Burns) in tow, and a police inspector (Tom Reese) arrives—and is promptly killed. As the night progresses, Jack, Teak, Seyton and Dr. Von Vandervon are murdered, as is Archie the cook (Robert Deveau). Happy discovers a woman (Susan McConnell) locked in an attic room. Although the group assumes she is the ghost of Sarah Cavinder, the housemaid Jane (Trish Geiger) tells them that she is Thessaly, the confrontational and slightly insane daughter of Sinas Cavinder. Jane also knows the contents of the letter and tells Faraday and Tuesday that the letter makes Thessaly, not Sabasha, the inheritor of the estate.

Faraday and Tuesday track down and confront the guilty parties—Burling and Sabasha, who began the night working independently but who later "joined forces" to knock off their rivals to the inheritance. Faraday and Tuesday also deduce that the real Sabasha is dead and that the woman pretending to be her is actually Dr. Von Vandervon's escaped lunatic.

Burling threatens to blow up the house unless Faraday and Tuesday turn over the letter, but he is accidentally electrocuted after being confronted by Thessaly. Ray appears and admits that he is actually Bax Tremblay, a police investigator working undercover. He, Faraday, and Tuesday attempt to apprehend the false Sabasha, but she strangles herself to death to avoid capture.

The next morning, Thessaly takes possession of the estate. Faraday proposes marriage to Tuesday and she accepts; the two of them agree to share their newspaper "scoop". They are driven away by Happy, who belatedly realizes that because he left the cab's meter running all night, Faraday owes him $87.42.

== Cast ==
- Daniel Roebuck as 8 O'Clock Faraday
- Jennifer Blaire as Billy Tuesday
- Dan Conroy as Happy Codburn
- Jim Beaver as Jack Tugdon
- Larry Blamire as Ray Vestinhaus
- Brian Howe as Burling Famish, Jr.
- James Karen as Seyton Ethelquake
- Allison Martin as Mrs. Cupcupboard
- Fay Masterson as Sabasha Fanmoore
- Susan McConnell as Thessaly
- Andrew Parks as Lord Partfine
- Kevin Quinn as Teak Armbruster
- Christine Romeo as Pristy Famish
- H.M. Wynant as Dr. Van Von Vandervon
- Trish Geiger as Jane Hovenham
- Tom Reese as Inspector Riley

== Release ==
The film was first screened at the Palm Springs International Film Festival on January 16, 2009. The film began its theatrical run at the Coolidge Corner in Boston on May 21, 2010, and was released on DVD by Shout! Factory on August 17, 2010, as was another Blamire film, The Lost Skeleton Returns Again.

In February 2020, it was announced that the a Special Edition "Dark and Stormy Night" Blu-Ray was going to be released in July 2020. The Blu-Ray will include an HD version of the film in Black and white, a color version in SD, first ever released Behind the Screens footage along with 2 "Reanimated Movie Classic" short film featurettes titled "Curse of the Droptraus" and "The Girl in the Clock".

== Reception ==
Dark and Stormy Night received mixed reviews. Boston Phoenix film critic Peter Keough gave the film a rating of 2 1/2 stars (out of 4), calling it a "fitfully entertaining black-and-white farce."

Boston Globe critic Tom Russo gave the film 2 stars (out of 4), noting that "patter and performances will grow on you, but only after you've built some stamina."

The website Huffington Post gave the film an incredibly strong review, stating that "Blamire’s loving tribute to 1930s “dark house horror flicks," entitled Dark and Stormy Night, embraces and celebrates every cliché of the genre."

== See also ==
- List of black-and-white films produced since 1970
