= Baegunsan =

Baegunsan (백운산; 白雲山) is the name of several mountains in South Korea:

- Baegunsan (Uiwang/Suwon), in the communities of Uiwang, Suwon, and Yongin in Gyeonggi-do
- Baegunsan (Gangwon/Gyeonggi), in the city of Pocheon, Gyeonggi-do and Hwacheon County, Gangwon-do
- Baegunsan (North Chungcheong/Gangwon), in the cities of Wonju, Gangwon-do and Jecheon, Chungcheongbuk-do
- Baegunsan (Jeongseon/Pyeongchang), in Jeongseon and Pyeongchang Counties, Gangwon-do
- Baegunsan (South Jeolla), in Gwangyang, Jeollanam-do
- Baegunsan (South Gyeongsang/North Jeolla), in Hamyang County, Gyeongsangnam-do and Jangsu County, Jeollabuk-do
