= List of wild edible plants in Mongolian cuisine =

The following is a list of wild edible plants in Mongolian cuisine:

== Oil ==
- Cannabis sativa

== Cereal ==
- Abutilon theophrasti
- Agriophyllus arenarium
- Artemisia anethifolia
- Artemisia annua
- Artemisia pectina
- Artemisia xerophytica
- Convolvulus gortschakovii
- Corispermum mongolicum
- Elymus giganteus
- Fagopyrum esculentum
- Kalidium foliatum
- Polygonum alpinum
- Polygonum sibiricum
- Psammochloa villosa

== Fruits and berries ==
- Amygdalus mongolica
- Crataegus sanguinea
- Elaeagnus angustifolia
- Ephedra sinica
- Fragaria orientalis
- Grossularia acicularis
- Hippophae rhamnoides
- Malus baccata
- Malus pallasiana
- Nitaria Roborowskii
- Oxycoccus microcarpus
- Padus asiatica
- Prunus armeniaca sibirica
- Ribes altissimum
- Ribes nigrum
- Ribes rubrum
- Rubus sachalinensis
- Sorbus sibirica
- Vaccinium vitisidaea

== Mushrooms ==
- Psalliota arvensis
- Psalliota campestris

== Onion family ==
- Allium altacium
- Allium anisopodium
- Allium fischeri
- Allium lineare
- Allium macrostemon
- Allium ramosum
- Allium prostratum
- Allium senescens
- Allium victorialis

== Nuts ==
- Pinus sibrica

== Spices ==
- Carum buriaticum
- Schizonepeta annua

== Tea substitutes ==
- Bergenia crassifolia
- Betula gmelinii
- Chamaenerion angustifolium
- Dasiphora fruticosa
- Dendranthema indicum
- Geranium pseudosibiricum
- Lagopsis supina
- Lycium chinense
- Paeonia anomala
- Populus tremula
- Serratula cardunculus
- Spiraea media

== Starchy plants ==
- Agropyron repens
- Asparagus dahuricum
- Butomus umbellatus
- Cirsium esculentum
- Lilium martagon
- Lilium tenuifolium
- Phlomis tuberosa
- Phragmites communis
- Polygonum divaricatum
- Polygonum viviparum rhizome
- Potentilla anserina root
- Rumex altaicum
- Rumex compactum
- Rumex undulatum
- Sanguisorba officinalis root
- Sinomorium songaricum
- Sphallerocarpus gracilis
- Typha laxmanni

== Sweeteners ==
- Glycyrrhiza uralensis

== Snacks ==
- Corylus heterophylla
- Cyanchum chinense
- Erodium stephanianum
- Juglans mandshurica

== Greens ==
- Cynanchum sibiricum
- Heracleum dissectum
- Rheum nanum
- Rumex acetosa
- Polygonum aviculare
- Urtica angustifolia

== Vegetables ==
- Adenophora remotiflora
- Adenophora polyantha
- Amaranthus retroflexus
- Armeniaca sibirica
- Artemisia frigida
- Athyrium brevifrons
- Caltha palustris
- Chenopodium acuminatum
- Chenopodium album
- Cirsium setosum
- Codonopsis lanceolata
- Crataegus pinnatifida
- Cynanchum thesioides
- Ferula bungeana
- Hemerocallis minor
- Hemiptelea davidii
- Kochia scoparia
- Lespedeza davurica
- Lilium pumilum
- Malva verticillata
- Oenanthe javanica
