= Hemerocallis hongdoensis =

Hongdo Island day-lily hongdo-wonch'uri

Scientific classification
- Kingdom: Plantae
- Clade: Tracheophytes
- Clade: Angiosperms
- Clade: Monocots
- Order: Asparagales
- Family: Asphodelaceae
- Subfamily: Hemerocallidoideae
- Genus: Hemerocallis
- Species: H. hongdoensis

Binomial name
- Hemerocallis hongdoensis M.G. Chung & S.S. Kang

Species of flowering plant

Hemerocallis hongdoensis, common name Hongdo Island day-lily or (in Korean) hongdo-wonch'uri, is a plant species native to a group of small islands in the Yellow Sea, off the southwest coast of South Korea. The species is named for Hongdo Island, where the type specimen was collected, about 115 km SW of Mokpo. The region is part of Dadohaehaesang National Park.

The species is not recognized by Plants of the World Online, which considers it to be a synonym of Hemerocallis hakuunensis.

Hemerocallis hongdoensisis a perennial herb with tuberous roots but no rhizomes. Leaves are narrow, thick, up to 100 cm long. Flowering stalks are up to 80 cm tall, sometimes bearing as many as 25 flowers, with ovate to lanceolate bracts below the inflorescence. Tepals are yellow-orange, up to 10 cm long. Fruits are egg-shaped to almost spherical, up to 4 cm long, the surface usually covered with wart-like projections. Seeds black, egg-shaped, up to 7 mm long. The species is distinguished from others in the genus by having swollen roots but no rhizomes, and relatively large fruits with wartlike projections.
