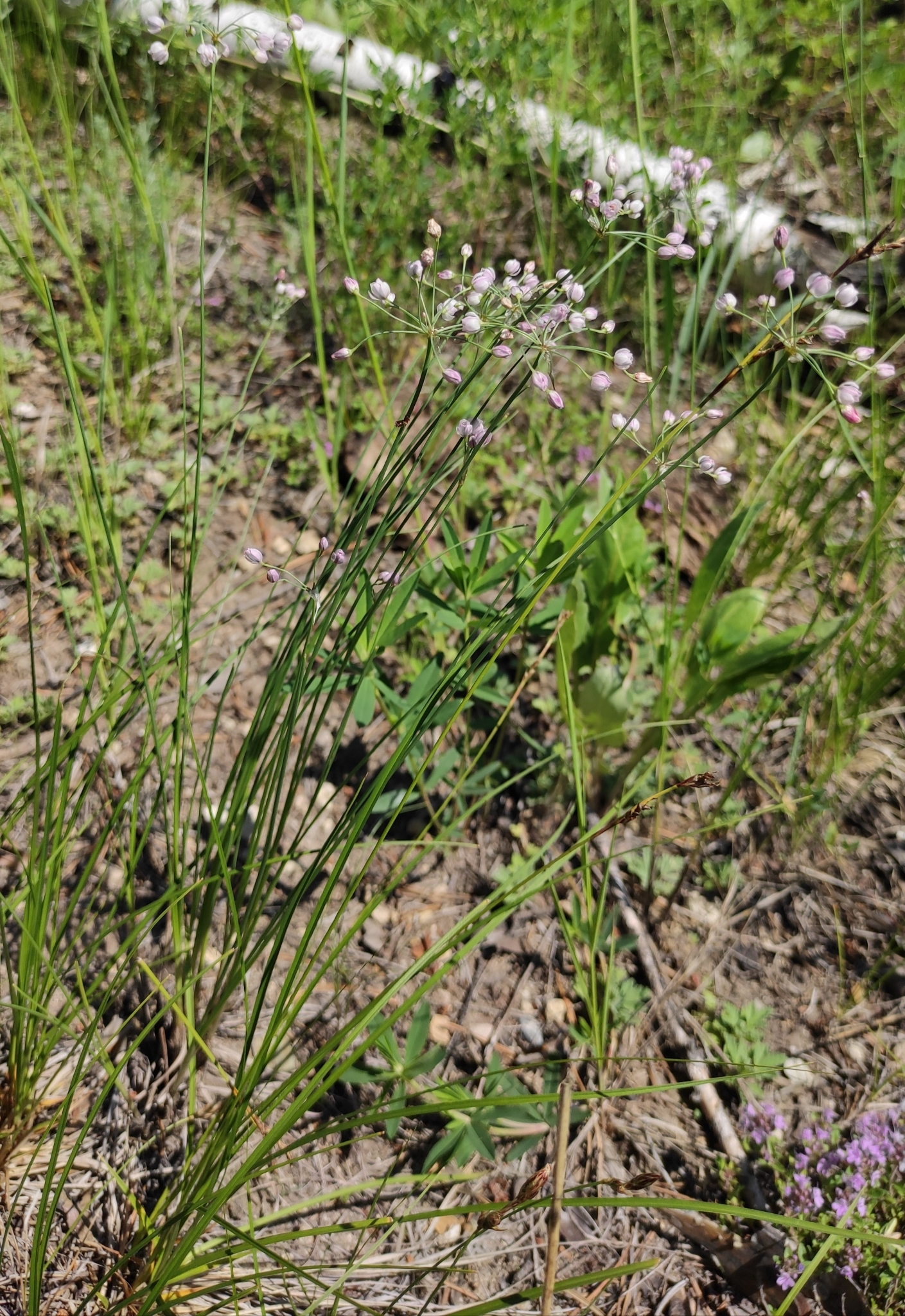

Scientific classification
- Kingdom: Plantae
- Clade: Embryophytes
- Clade: Tracheophytes
- Clade: Spermatophytes
- Clade: Angiosperms
- Clade: Monocots
- Order: Asparagales
- Family: Amaryllidaceae
- Subfamily: Allioideae
- Genus: Allium
- Subgenus: A. subg. Rhizirideum
- Species: A. tenuissimum

Binomial name
- Allium tenuissimum L.

Synonyms
- Allium tenuissimum var. purpureum Regel

= Allium tenuissimum =

Species of flowering plant

Allium tenuissimum is an Asian species of wild onion native to Mongolia, Asiatic Russia, Korea, Kazakhstan and China.

Allium tenuissimum produces a cluster of small, narrow bulbs. Scapes are up to 50 cm tall. Leaves are tubular, shorter than the scapes, about 10 mm in diameter. Flowers are white or pink with a narrow red midvein along each of the tepals.

Varieties

- Allium tenuissimum var. nalinicum S.Chen - Inner Mongolia
- Allium tenuissimum var. tenuissimum - most of specific range

formerly included

- Allium tenuissimum var. anisopodium, now called Allium anisopodium
- Allium tenuissimum f. zimmermannianum, now called Allium anisopodium var. zimmermannianum
