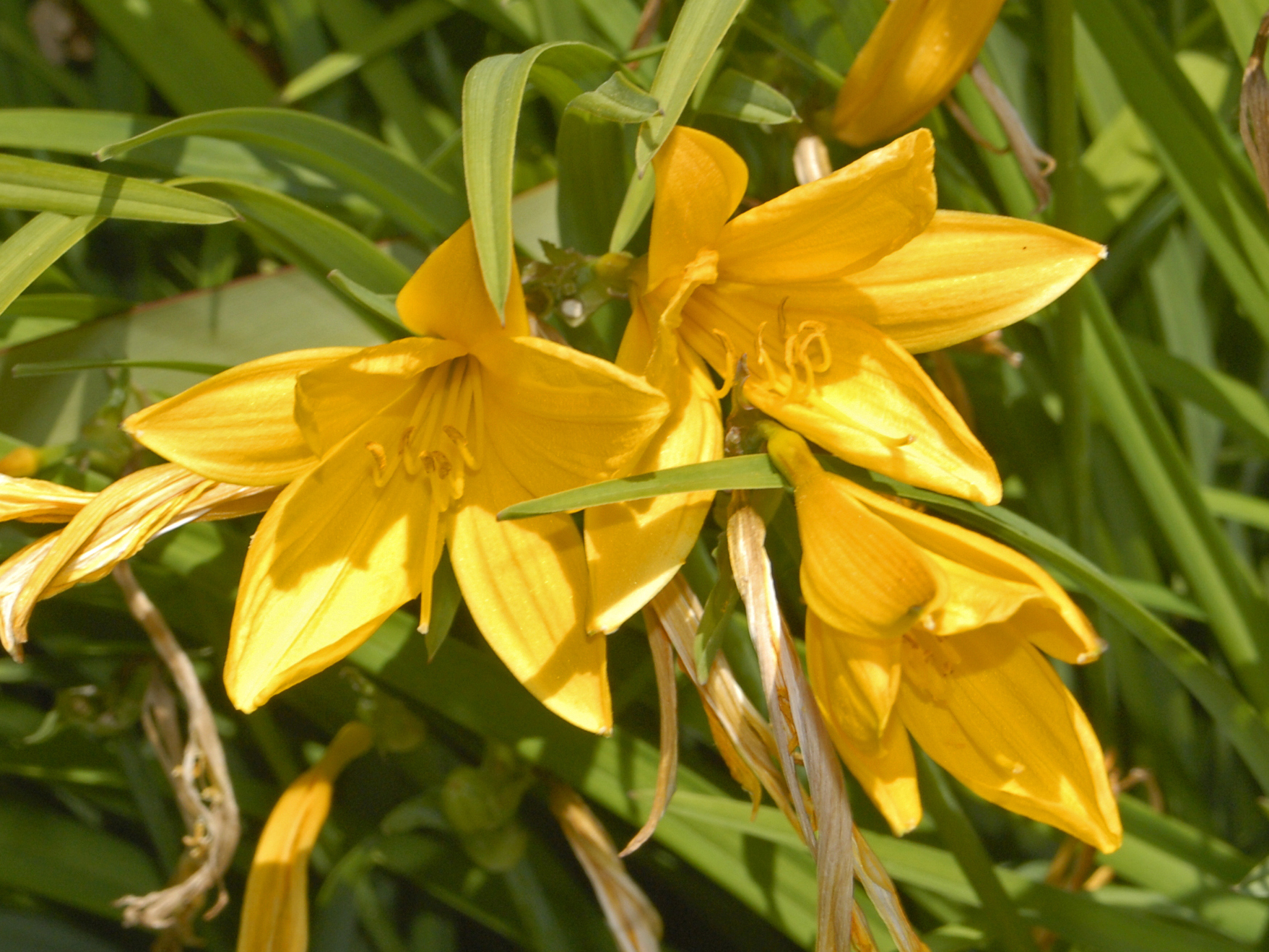
- At the Jardin des Plantes, Paris

Scientific classification
- Kingdom: Plantae
- Clade: Tracheophytes
- Clade: Angiosperms
- Clade: Monocots
- Order: Asparagales
- Family: Asphodelaceae
- Subfamily: Hemerocallidoideae
- Genus: Hemerocallis
- Species: H. citrina

Binomial name
- Hemerocallis citrina Baroni

= Hemerocallis citrina =

Species of flowering plant

Hemerocallis citrina, commonly known as citron daylily and long yellow daylily, is a species of herbaceous perennial plant in the family Asphodelaceae.

== Description ==
Hemerocallis citrina can reach a height of 90–120 centimetres (35–47 in). It has bright green, linear arching leaves about 40 cm long. Flowers are lemon yellow, trumpet-shaped, showy and very fragrant, about 15 centimetres (5.9 in) in diameter. They bloom from June to July.

Long yellow day lily is cultivated in Asia for its edible flowers.

== Distribution and habitat ==
This species is native to East Asia and China. It grows in forest margins, grassy fields and slopes, at an elevation of 0–2,000 metres (0–6,562 ft) above sea level.

== Culinary uses ==
The tubers, inflorescences, buds and flowers can all be cooked and eaten.

Dried or fresh flowers, sometimes called "gum jum" or "golden needles" (Chinese: 金針; pinyin: jīnzhēn; Jyutping: gam1 zam1) or as huánghuācài (黃花菜, lit. 'yellow flower vegetable') are used in Chinese cuisine for dishes including hot and sour soup, daylily soup (金針花湯), Buddha's delight, and moo shu pork.

In Burmese, dried daylily flowers are called pangyauk (ပန်းခြောက်; lit. 'dried flower'), and feature in several soups and Burmese salads, including kya zan hinga.

== Toxicity ==
Consuming its raw or undercooked non-dried flowers may cause unwellness. Symptoms include vomiting, abdominal pain and diarrhea.
