= Hemerocallis coreana =

Scientific classification
- Kingdom: Plantae
- Clade: Tracheophytes
- Clade: Angiosperms
- Clade: Monocots
- Order: Asparagales
- Family: Asphodelaceae
- Subfamily: Hemerocallidoideae
- Genus: Hemerocallis
- Species: H. coreana

Binomial name
- Hemerocallis coreana Nakai

Species of flowering plant

Hemerocallis coreana is a species of plant in the family Asphodelaceae. It is native to China, southwestern Korea and southern Japan.
