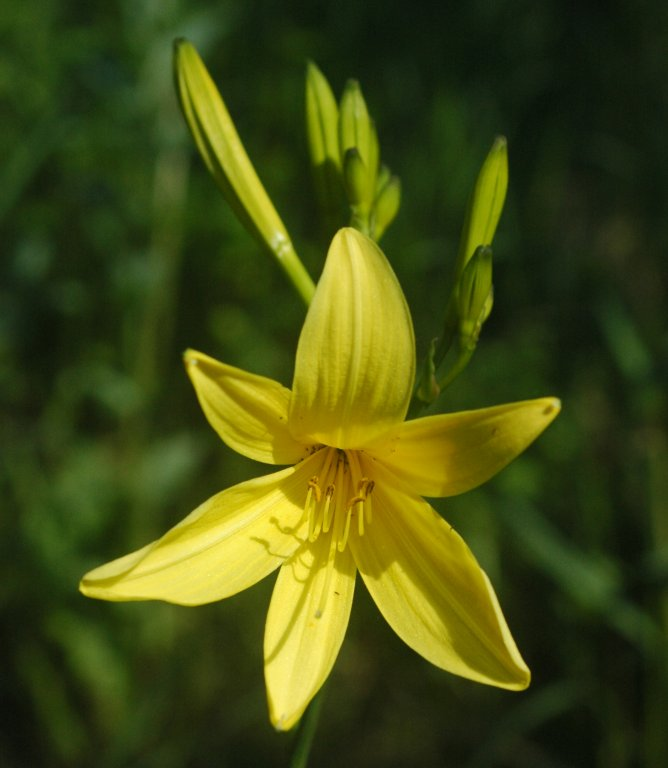
- Hemerocallis lilioasphodelus

Scientific classification
- Kingdom: Plantae
- Clade: Embryophytes
- Clade: Tracheophytes
- Clade: Spermatophytes
- Clade: Angiosperms
- Clade: Monocots
- Order: Asparagales
- Family: Asphodelaceae
- Subfamily: Hemerocallidoideae
- Genus: Hemerocallis; L.

Type species
- Hemerocallis lilioasphodelus L.

Synonyms
- Lilioasphodelus Fabr.; Cameraria Boehm. in C.G.Ludwig

= Daylily =

Genus of flowering plants

A daylily, day lily or ditch-lily is a flowering plant in the genus Hemerocallis /ˌhɛmɪroʊˈkælɪs/, a member of the family Asphodelaceae, subfamily Hemerocallidoideae, native to Asia. Despite the common name, it is not taxonomically classified in the lily genus. Gardening enthusiasts and horticulturists have long bred Hemerocallis species for their attractive flowers; a select few species of the genus have edible petals, while some are extremely toxic. Thousands of cultivars have been registered by the American Daylily Society, the only internationally recognized registrant according to the International Code of Nomenclature for Cultivated Plants. The plants are perennial, whose common name alludes to its flowers, which typically last about a day.

== Description ==
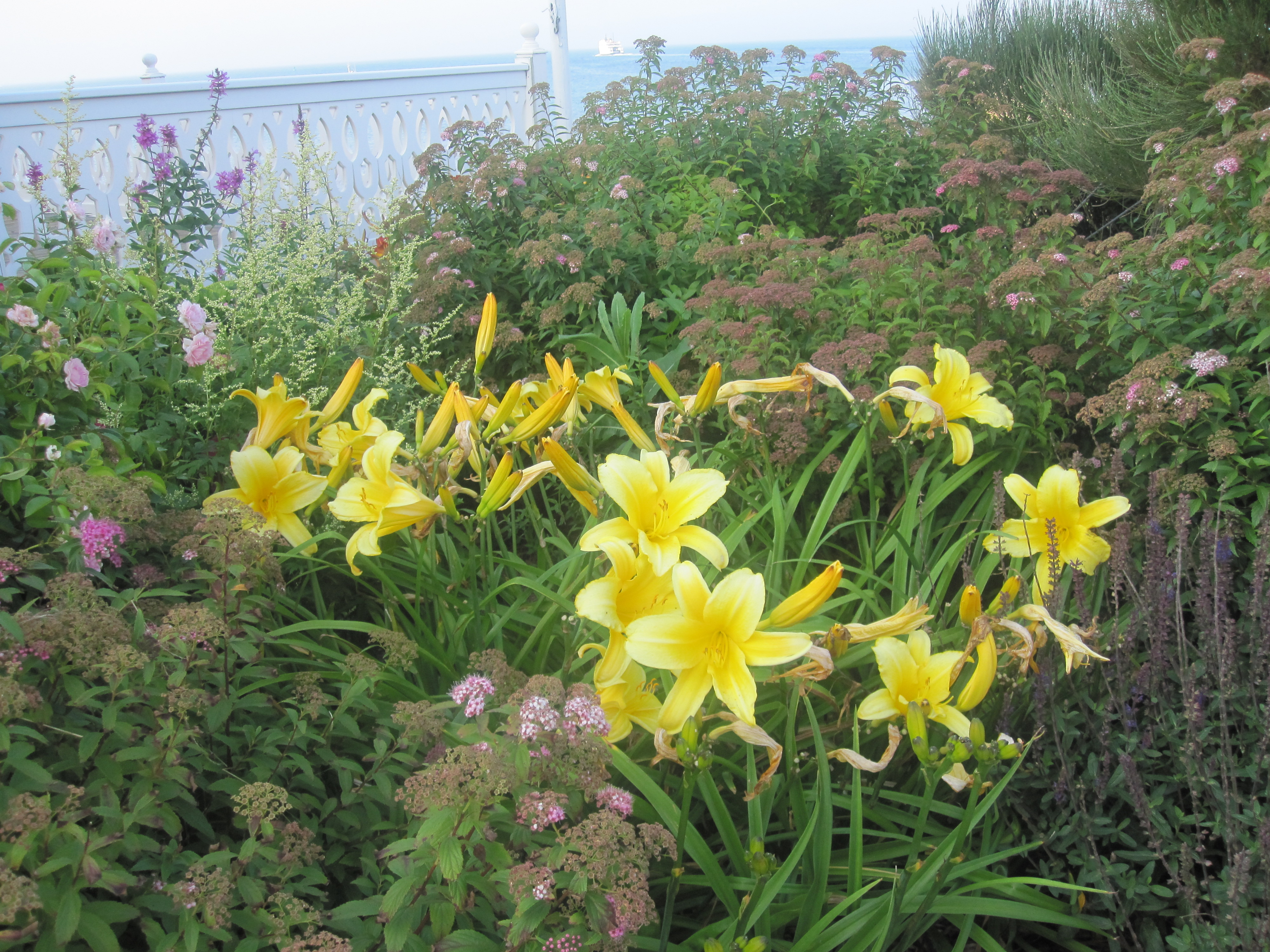
Daylilies on Block Island, Rhode Island.

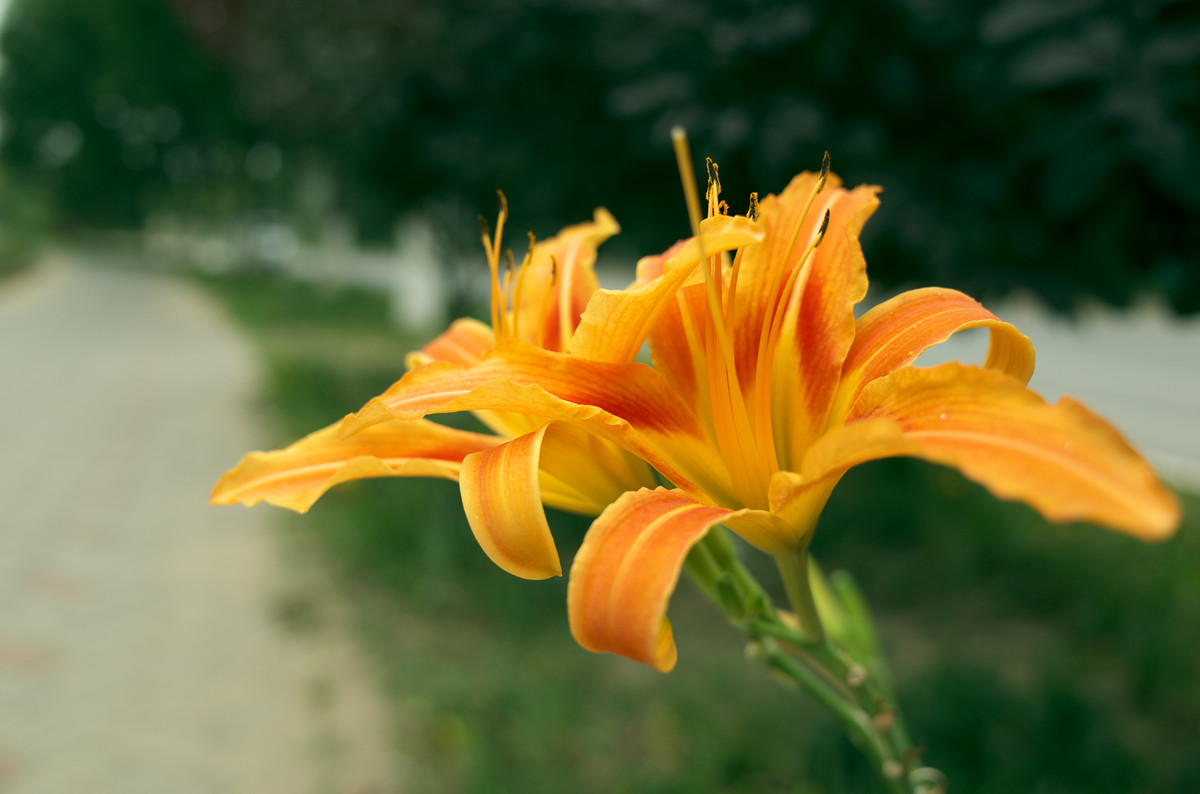
The orange daylily (Hemerocallis fulva) in China

Hemerocallis are herbaceous clump-forming perennials growing from rhizomes, some produce spreading stolons. They have a fibrous or fibrous-tuberous root system with contractile roots. The tuberous roots are used to store nutrients and water. The arching leaves are produced from the base of the plant (basal) and lack petioles, they are strap-like, long, linear lanceolate leaves and grow in the shape of water spraying up from a fountain, curving downward as it falls. The crown is the small portion between the leaves and the roots. The large showy flowers are produced on scapes. The slightly irregular shaped flowers are arranged in helicoid cymes, or produced solitarily. The scapes of some species and cultivars produce small leafy proliferations arising from the nodes or in bracts. The proliferations are clones that root when planted.

Typically Hemerocallis flowers have three similar petals and three sepals, collectively called tepals, and each has a midrib. The centermost part of the flower, called the throat, may be a color differing from the more distal areas of the tepals. Each flower has six stamens joined to the perianth tube, each with a two-lobed anther. The unequal stamen filaments are curved upward with the linear-oblong anthers dorsifixed. The superior ovary is green, with three chambers and the stigma is 3-lobed or capitate. The fruit is a capsule (often erroneously called a pod since botanical pods are found in Fabaceae). The fruits may have no seeds (sterile), or many relatively large, shiny, black, roundish seeds. The flowers of most species open in early morning and wither during the following night, possibly replaced by another one on the same scape the next day. Some species are night-blooming. The haploid number of chromosomes is eleven.

== Taxonomy ==
Despite their common name, daylilies are not true lilies (plants from the genus Lilium, family Liliaceae). Although the flowers of Hemerocallis and Lilium species have a similar shape, their growth habits, stems and leaf shapes are distinctive. Before 2009, the scientific classification of daylilies put them into the family Liliaceae. In 2009, under the APG III system, daylilies were removed from the family Liliaceae and assigned to the family Xanthorrhoeaceae, subfamily Hemerocallidoideae. Xanthorrhoeaceae was renamed in 2017 to Asphodelaceae in the APG IV system

=== Species ===
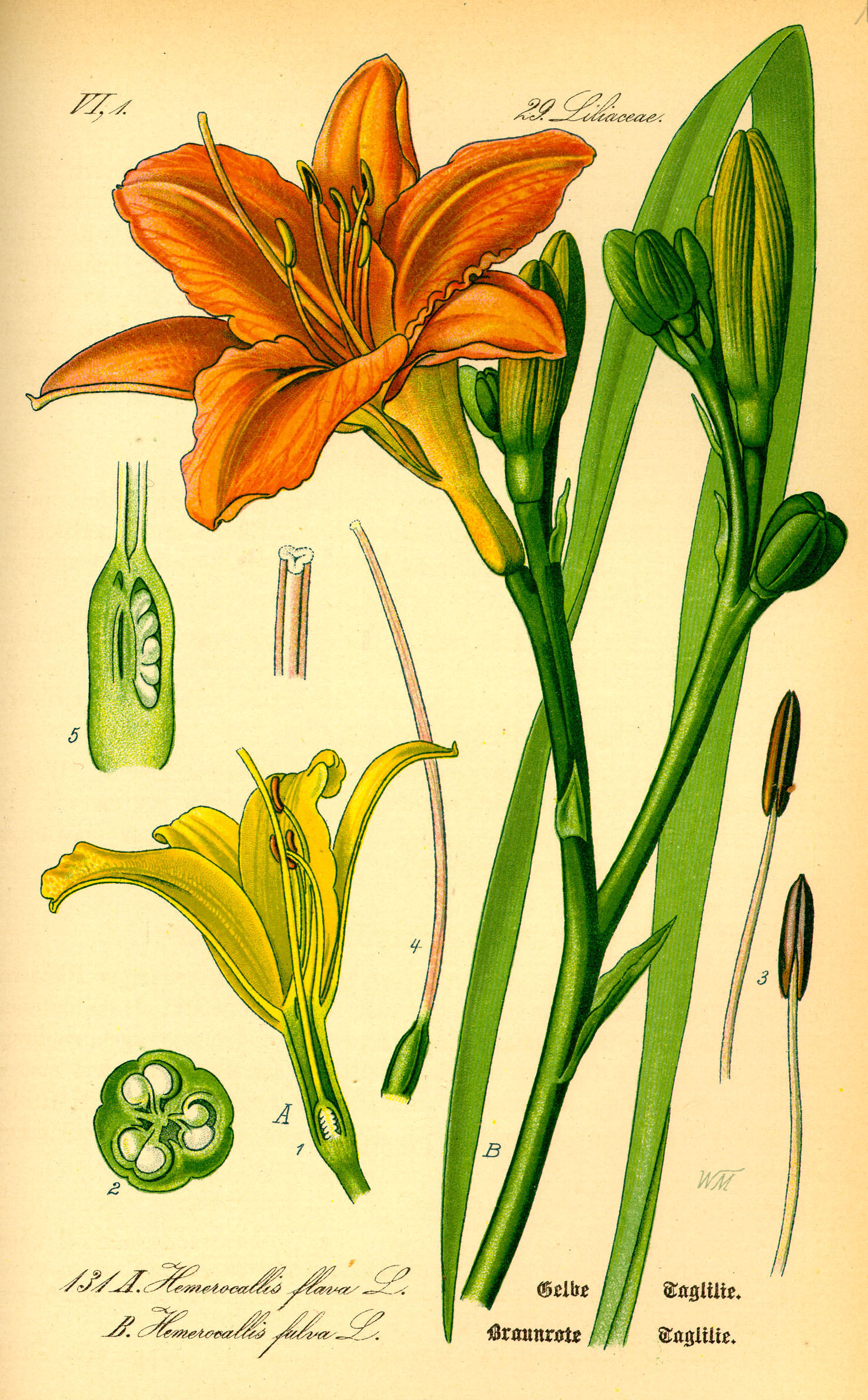
Hemerocallis fulva, illustration of 1885

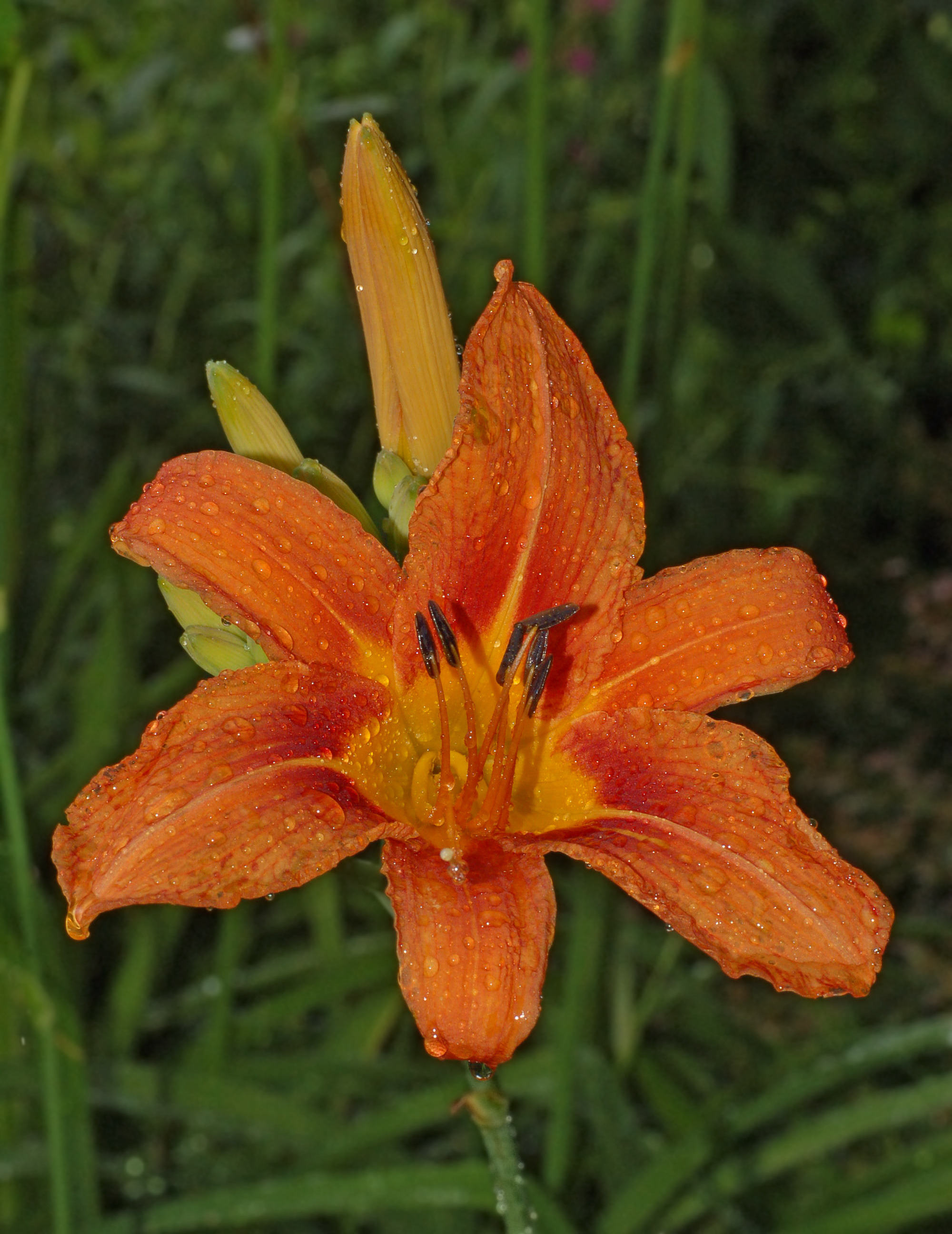
The tawny daylily (Hemerocallis fulva)

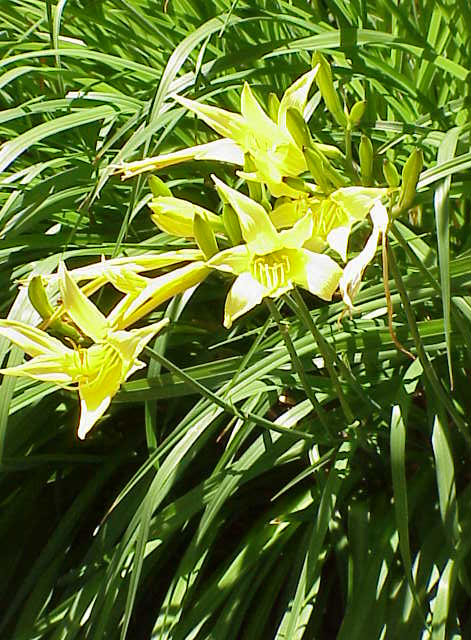
Hemerocallis thunbergii

As of January 2020, Plants of the World Online recognized 16 species:

- Hemerocallis citrina Baroni (syn. H. altissima Stout, H. coreana Nakai) - China, Japan, Korea, Russian Far East
- Hemerocallis coreana Nakai - Japan, Korea, Shandong Province in China
- Hemerocallis darrowiana S.Y.Hu - Sakhalin Island in Russia
- Hemerocallis dumortieri E.Morren - China, Japan, Korea
- Hemerocallis forrestii Diels - Sichuan + Yunnan Provinces in China
- Hemerocallis fulva (L.) L. (H. sempervirens Araki, H. sendaica Ohwi and H. aurantiaca Baker are now treated as varieties of this species) – orange daylily, tawny daylily, tiger lily, ditch lily - China, Japan, Korea; naturalized in Europe, North America, New Zealand, Indian Subcontinent; considered an invasive weed in some places
- Hemerocallis hakuunensis Nakai (syn. H. micrantha Nakai) - Korea; includes Hemerocallis hongdoensis M.G.Chung & S.S.Kang
- Hemerocallis lilioasphodelus L. (syn. H. flava (L.) L.) – lemon lily, yellow daylily - China, Mongolia, Russian Far East, Siberia, Kazakhstan; naturalized in Europe and North America
- Hemerocallis major (Baker) M.Hotta
- Hemerocallis middendorffii Trautv. & C.A.Mey. - China, Japan, Korea, Russian Far East

including H. middendorffii var. esculenta (Koidz.) Ohwi, syn. H. esculenta Koidz. – Japan; H. middendorffii var. exaltata, syn. H. exaltata Stout

- Hemerocallis minor Mill. (syn. H. sulphurea Nakai) - China, Mongolia, Korea, Russian Far East, Siberia
- Hemerocallis multiflora Stout - Henan Province in China
- Hemerocallis nana W.W.Sm. & Forrest - Yunnan Province in China
- Hemerocallis plicata Stapf - Sichuan + Yunnan Provinces in China
- Hemerocallis thunbergii Barr (syn. H. serotina Focke, H. vespertina Hara) - Japan
- Hemerocallis yezoensis H.Hara - Japan, Kuril Islands

Two hybrids are recognized:

- Hemerocallis × exilis Satake = H. fulva var. angustifolia × H. thunbergii
- Hemerocallis × fallaxlittoralis Konta & S.Matsumoto = H. littorea × H. thunbergii

A number of hybrid names appear in the horticultural literature but are not recognized as valid by the World Checklist of Selected Plant Families. These include:

- H. × hybrida
- H. × ochroleuca
- H. × stoutiana
- H. × traubara, H. × traubiana
- H. × washingtonia
- H. × yeldara, H. × yeldiana

=== Etymology ===
The name Hemerocallis comes from the Greek words ἡμέρα (hēmera) "day" and καλός (kalos) "beautiful".

== Distribution and habitat ==
Hemerocallis species are native to Asia, primarily eastern Asia, including China, Korea, Japan and southern Siberia. This genus is popular worldwide because of the showy flowers and hardiness of many kinds. There are over 80,000 registered cultivars. Hundreds of cultivars have fragrant flowers, and more scented cultivars are appearing more frequently in northern hybridization programs. Some earlier blooming cultivars rebloom later in the season, particularly if their capsules, in which seeds are developing, are removed.

Daylilies have been found growing wild for millennia throughout China, Mongolia, northern India, Korea, and Japan. There are thousand-year-old Chinese paintings showing orange daylilies that are remarkably similar to the flowers that grace modern gardens.

Daylilies may have been first brought to Europe by traders along the silk routes from Asia. However it was not until 1753 that daylilies were given their botanic name of Hemerocallis by the Swedish naturalist Carl Linnaeus.

Daylilies were first brought to North America by early European immigrants, who packed the roots along with other treasured possessions for the journey to the New World. By the early 1800s, the plant had become naturalized, and a bright orange clump of flowers was a common sight in many homestead gardens.

The orange or tawny daylily (Hemerocallis fulva), common along roadsides in much of North America, is native to Asia. Along with the lemon lily (Hemerocallis flava), it is the foundational species for most modern cultivars.

== Cultivation ==
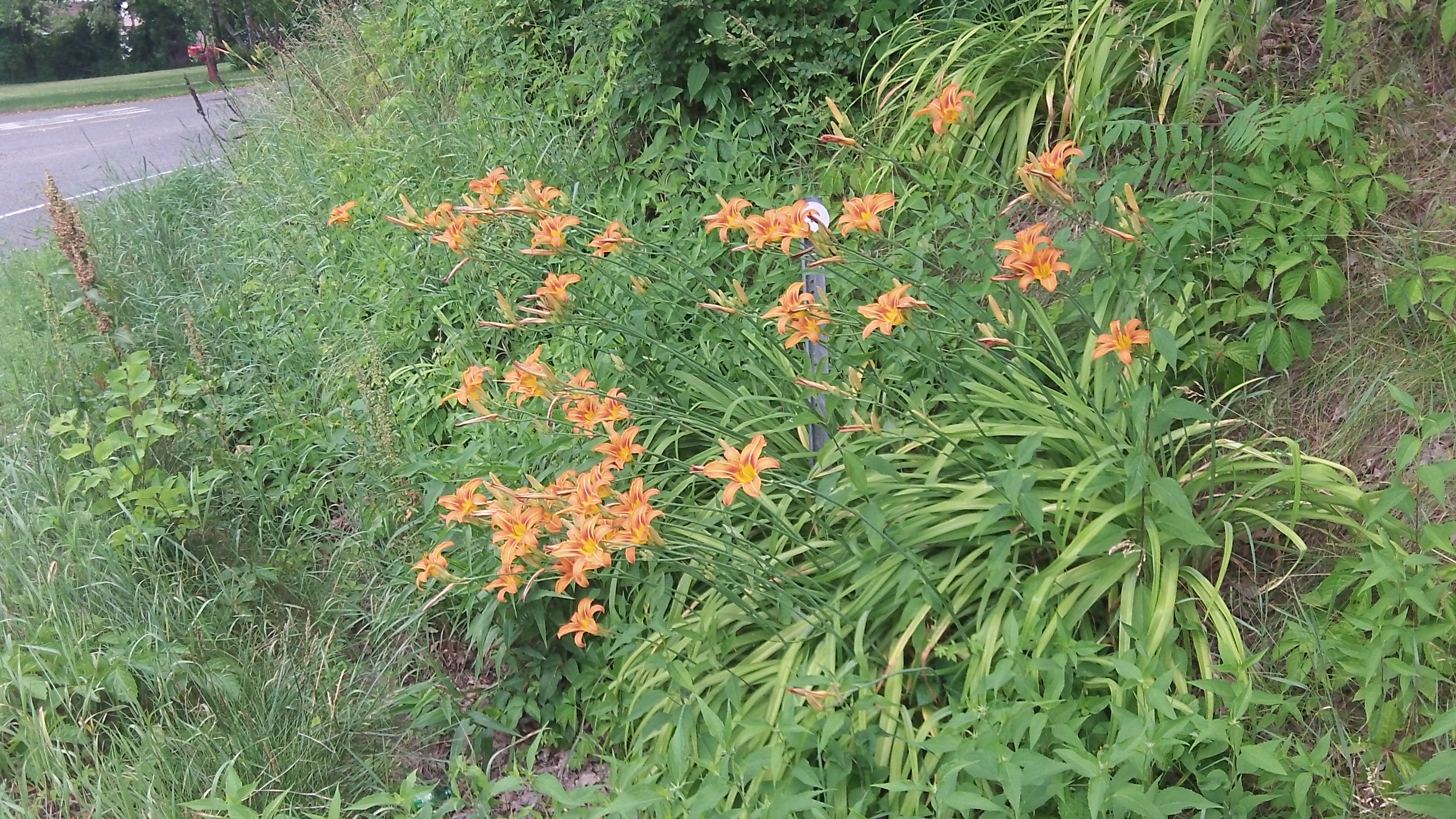
As the nickname "ditch lily" suggests, daylilies are capable of thriving with little or no human maintenance.

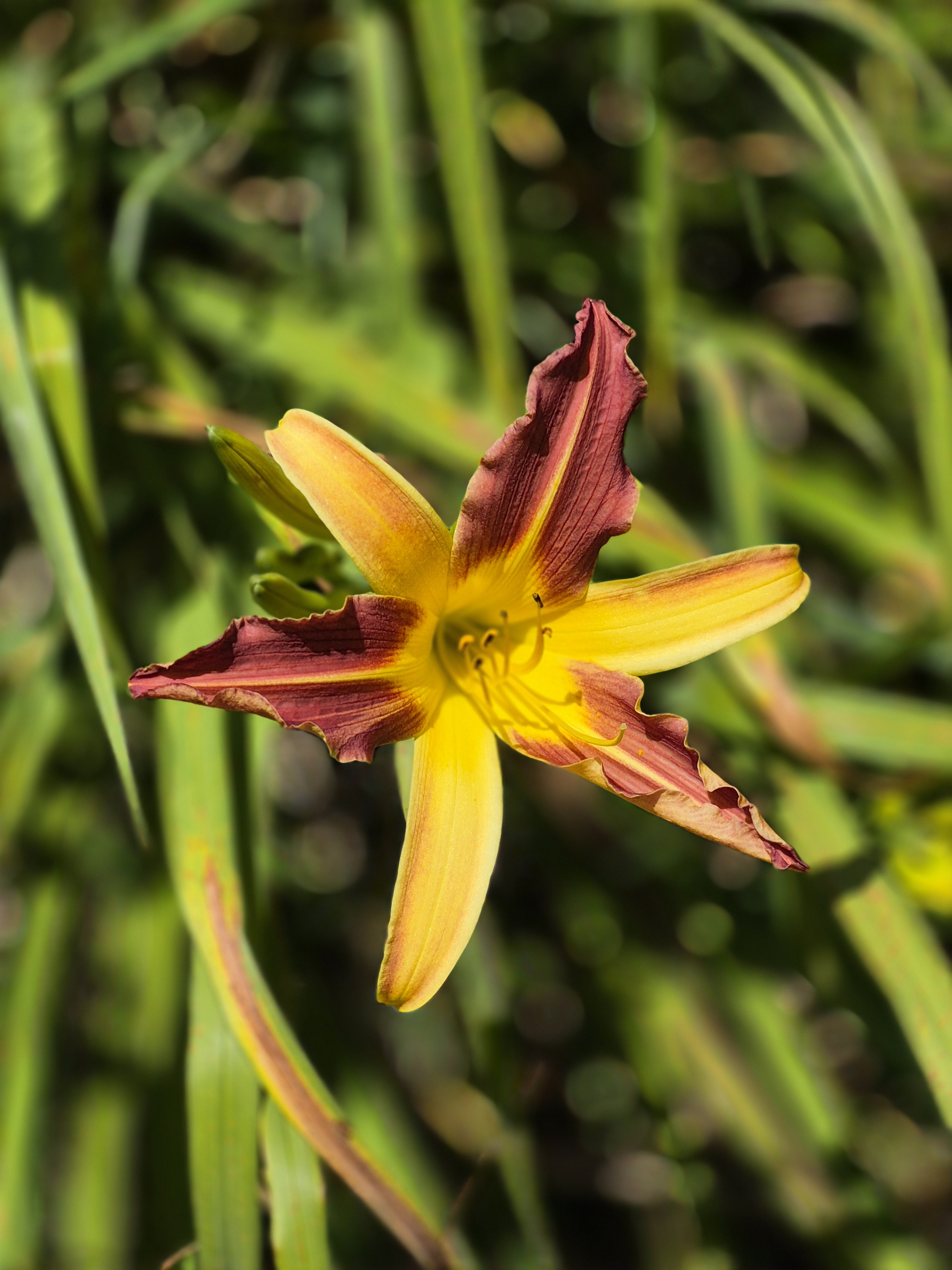
Specimen found in Brazil

As popular as daylilies were for many hundreds of years, it was not until the late 19th century that botanists and gardeners began to experiment with hybridizing the plants. Over the next hundred years, thousands of different hybrids were developed from only a few wild varieties. In fact, most modern hybrids are descended from two types of daylily. One is Hemerocallis flava—the yellow lemon lily. The other is Hemerocallis fulva, the familiar tawny-orange daylily, also known affectionately as the "ditch lily".

The daylily has been nicknamed "the perfect perennial" by gardeners, due to its brilliant colors, ability to tolerate drought and frost and to thrive in many different climate zones, and for being generally low maintenance. It is a vigorous perennial that lasts for many years in a garden, with very little care and adapts to many different soil and light conditions. Daylilies have a relatively short blooming period, depending on the type. Some will bloom in early spring while others wait until the summer or even autumn. Most daylily plants bloom for 1 through 5 weeks, although some bloom twice in one season ("rebloomers)". Daylilies are not commonly used as cut flowers for formal flower arranging, yet they make good cut flowers otherwise, as new flowers continue to open on cut stems over several days.

=== Cultivars ===
There are more than 100,000 daylily cultivars, the milestone having been achieved in 2024 Depending on the species and cultivar, daylilies grow in USDA plant hardiness zones 1 through 11, making them some of the more adaptable landscape plants. Hybridizers have developed the vast majority of cultivars within the last 100 years. The large-flowered, bright yellow Hemerocallis 'Hyperion', introduced in the 1920s, heralded a return to gardens of the once-dismissed daylily, and is still widely available in the nursery trade. Daylily breeding has been a specialty in the United States, where daylily heat- and drought-resistance made them garden standbys since the 1950s. New cultivars have sold for thousands of dollars, but many sturdy and prolific cultivars sell at reasonable prices of US$20 or less.

Hemerocallis is one of the very highly hybridized plant genera. Hybridizers register hundreds of new cultivars yearly. Hybridizers have extended the genus' color range from the yellow, orange, and pale pink of the species, through vibrant reds, purples, lavenders, greenish tones, near-black, near-white, and more. However, hybridizers have not yet been able to produce a daylily with primarily blue flowers. Flowers of some cultivars have small areas of bluish shades, particularly in the eyezones.

Other flower traits that hybridizers developed include height, scent, ruffled edges, doubling, contrasting "eyes" in the center of a bloom, fringed edges called ‘teeth’, and an illusion of glitter called "diamond dust". Sought-after improvements include rust resistance, foliage color, variegation, plant disease resistance, and the ability to form large, neat clumps. Hybridizers also seek to make cultivars cold-hardier by crossing evergreen and semi-evergreen plants with dormant varieties.

In recent decades, many hybridizers have focused on breeding tetraploid plants, which tend to have sturdier scapes and tepals than diploids, as well as some flower-color traits that are not found in diploids. Until this trend took root, nearly all daylilies were diploid. Tetraploid cultivars have 44 chromosomes, while triploids have 33 chromosomes and diploids have 22 chromosomes per individual plant. Diploid and tetraploid daylilies cannot be crossed to produce new cultivars Hemerocallis fulva 'Europa', H. fulva 'Kwanso', H. fulva 'Kwanso Variegata', H. fulva 'Kwanso Kaempfer', H. fulva var. maculata, H. fulva var. angustifolia, and H. fulva 'Flore Pleno' are all triploids that almost never produce seeds and reproduce almost solely by underground runners (stolons) and dividing groups by gardeners. A polymerous daylily flower is one with more than three sepals and more than three petals. Although some people synonymize "polymerous" with "double", some polymerous flowers have as many as twice the normal number of sepals and petals.

Formerly daylilies were only available in yellow, pink, fulvous (bronzed), and rosy-fulvous colors, now they come in an assortment of many more color shades and tints thanks to intensive hybridization. They can now be found in nearly every color except pure blue and pure white. Those with yellow, pink, and other pastel flowers may require full sun to bring out all of their colors; darker varieties, including many of those with red and purple flowers are not colorfast in bright sun.

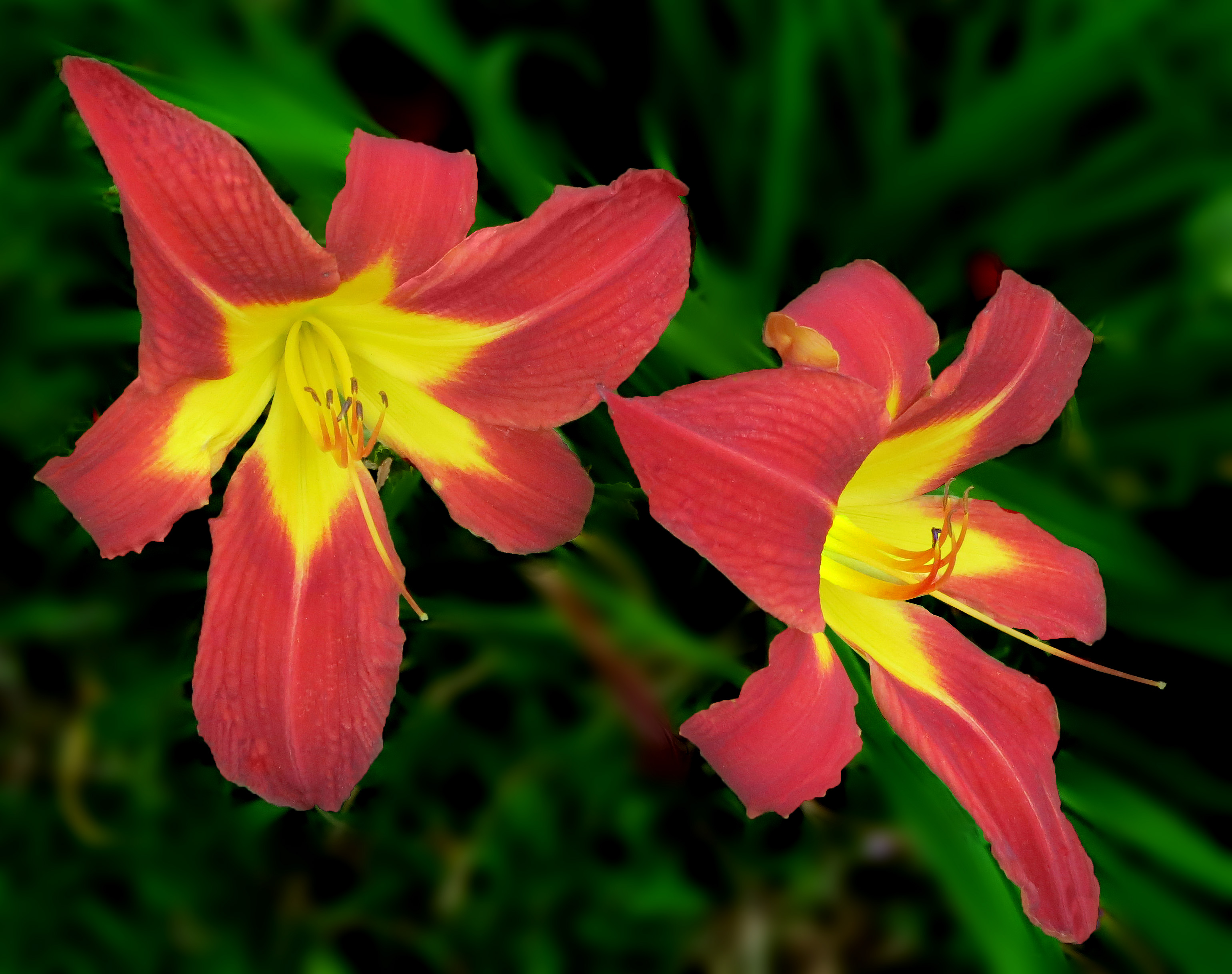
H. 'Ruby Spider'

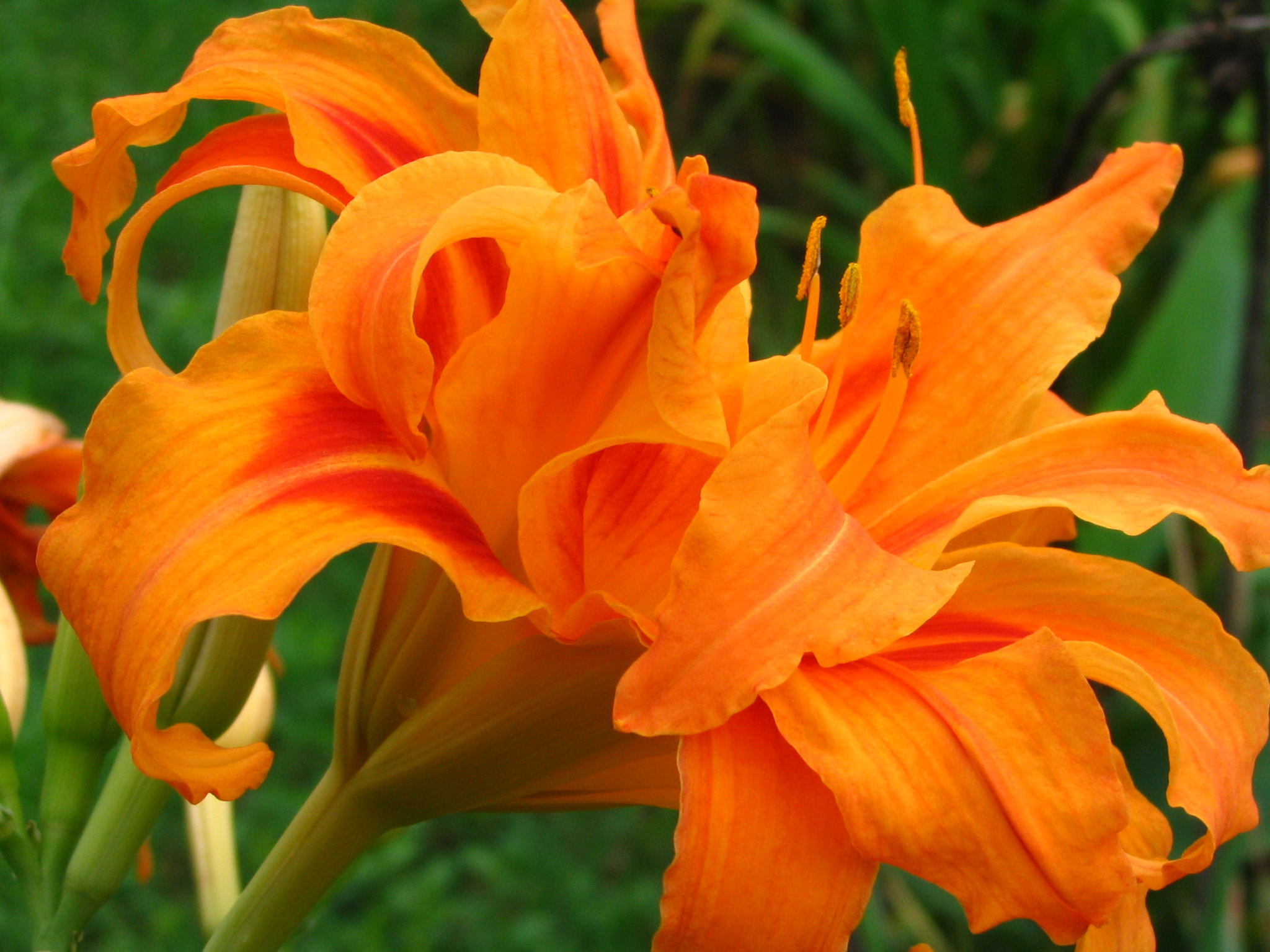
H. 'Kwanzo' – a triple-flowered triploid cultivar

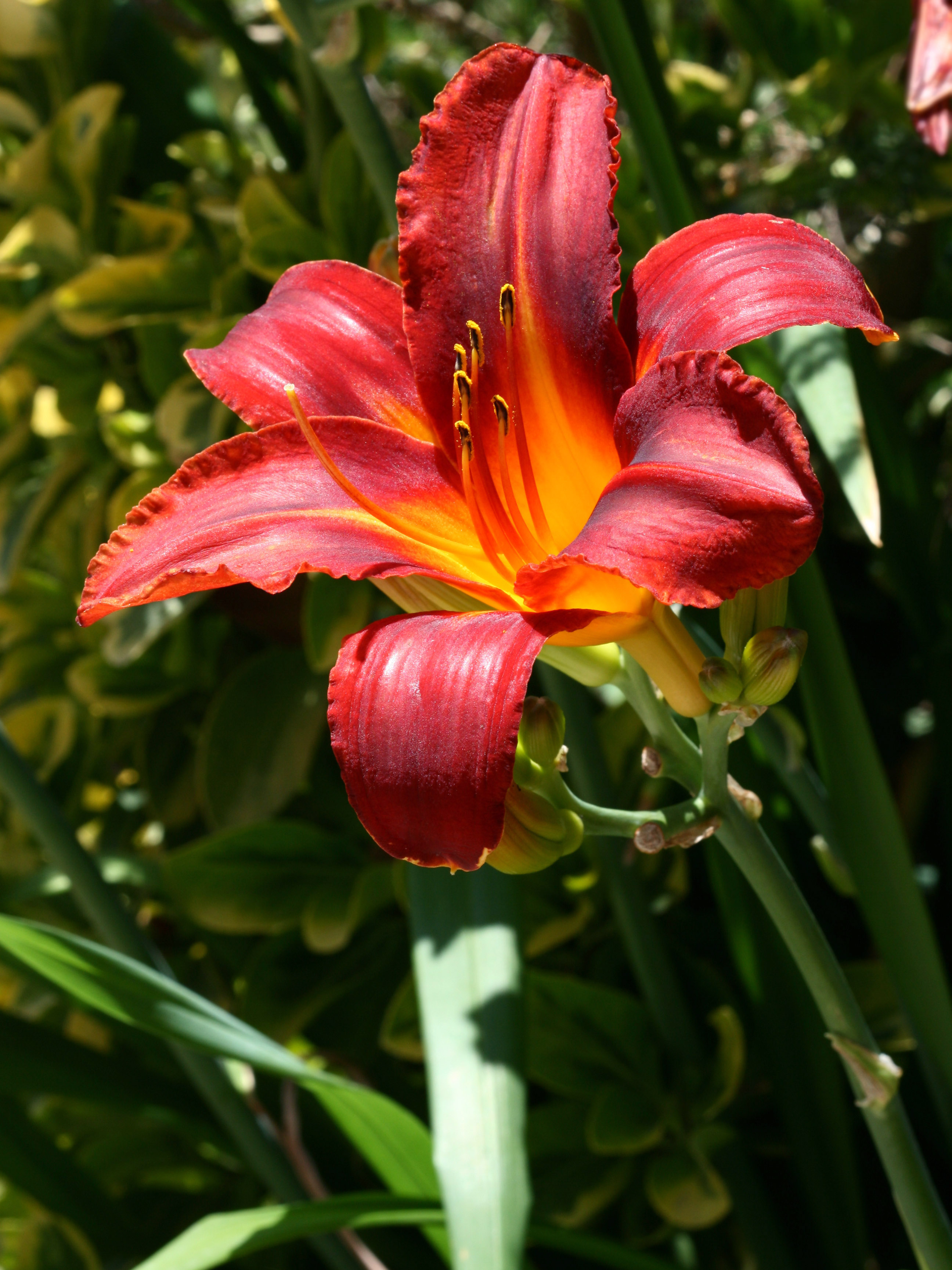
H. 'Red Magic'

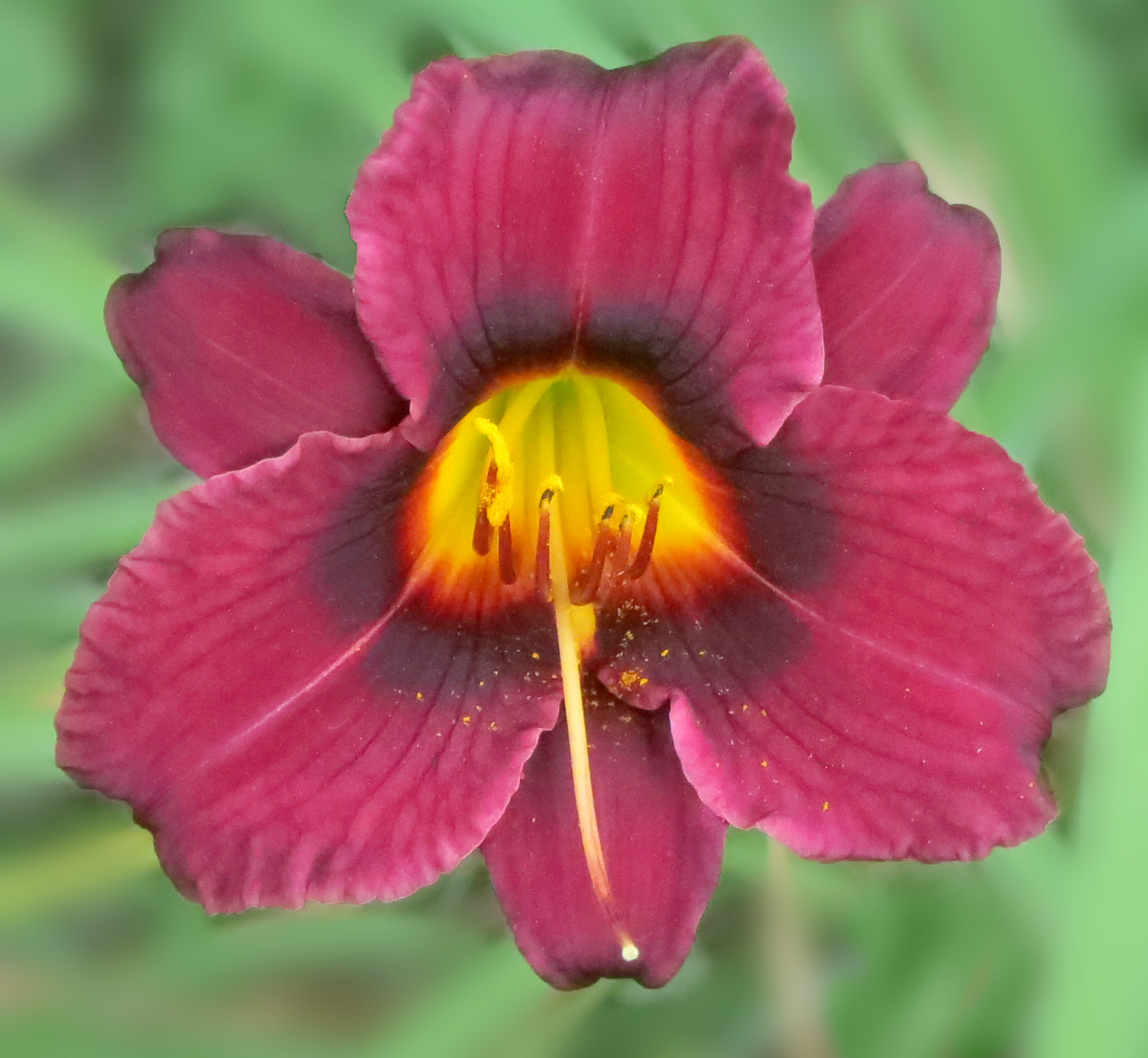
H. 'Wayside King Royale'

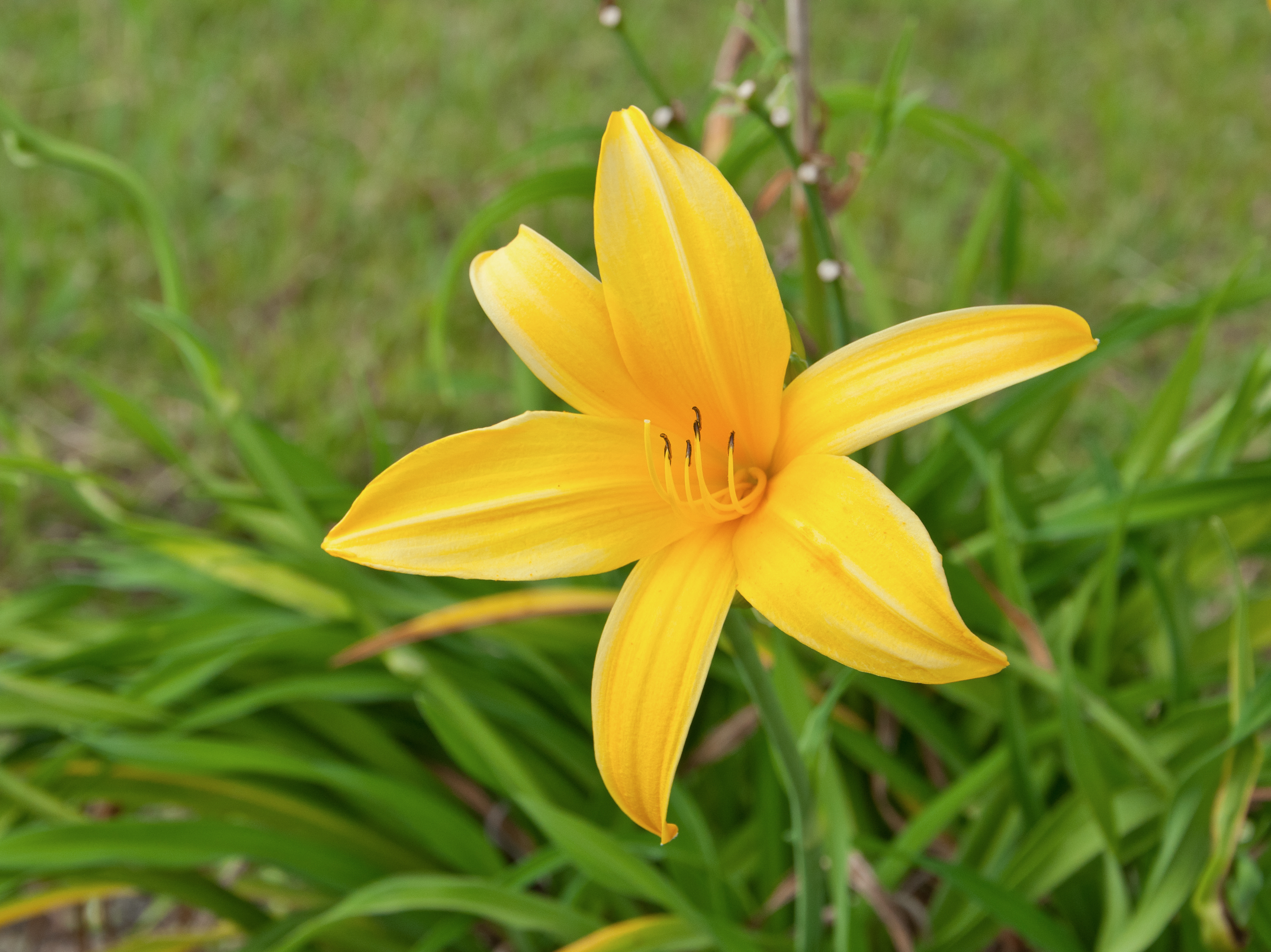
A Hemerocallis lilioasphodelus cultivar growing in Venezuela

==== Awards ====
The highest award a cultivar can receive in the United States is the Stout Silver Medal, given in memory of Dr. Arlow Burdette Stout, who is considered to be the father of modern daylily breeding in North America. This annual award—as voted by American Hemerocallis Society (AHS) Garden judges—can be given only to a cultivar that has first received the Award of Merit not less than two years previously. The 2014 winner of the Stout Silver Medal is 'Webster's Pink Wonder', hybridized by Richard Webster and introduced by R. Cobb. A complete list of Stout Silver Medal winners can be seen on the AHS website.

In the UK the following cultivars have gained the Royal Horticultural Society's Award of Garden Merit:

- 'All American Chief'
- 'Always Afternoon'
- 'Arctic Snow'
- 'Asterisk'
- 'August Frost'
- 'Beauty to Behold'
- 'Burning Daylight'
- 'Cat Dancer'
- 'Cayenne'
- 'Cherry Eyed Pumpkin'
- H. citrina
- 'Condilla'
- 'Curly Cinnamon Windmill'
- 'Custard Candy'
- 'Eggplant Escapade'
- 'Elegant Candy'
- 'Fooled Me'
- 'Grey Witch'
- 'Holly Dancer'
- 'Jamaican Me Crazy'
- 'Jellyfish Jealousy'
- 'Julie Newmar'
- 'Karen's Curls'
- 'Killer'
- 'Lady Neva'
- 'Lime Frost'
- 'Mahogany Magic'
- 'Mary's Gold'
- 'Moonlit Masquerade'
- 'North Wind Dancer'
- 'Old Tangiers'
- 'Performance Anxiety'
- ‘Pink Damask’
- 'Primal Scream'
- 'Radiant Moonbeam'
- ’Red Precious’
- 'Ruby Spider'
- 'Running Late'
- 'Russian Rhapsody'
- 'Selma Longlegs'
- 'Serena Sunburst'
- 'Sir Modred'
- 'Spider Man'
- 'Stafford'
- 'Strawberry Candy'
- 'Tuxedo Junction'

=== Pests and diseases ===
Contarinia quinquenotata, commonly known as the daylily gall midge, is a small gray insect infesting the flower buds of Hemerocallis species causing the flower to remain closed and rot. It is a pest within the horticultural trade in several parts of the world, including Southern and Eastern Europe, the United Kingdom, Canada, and the United States.

== Toxicity ==
Eating too many uncooked flowers of some species can cause diarrhea. Hemerocallis species are toxic to cats and ingestion may be fatal. Treatment is usually successful if started before kidney failure has developed.

== Uses ==
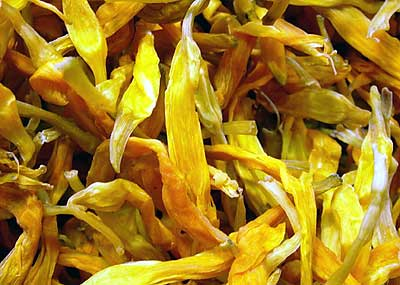
Dried golden needles

Daylilies are an economically important group of plants used medicinally, as food, and as horticultural plants. They have been cultivated in East Asia starting in China for thousands of years. Hemerocallin, a root neurotoxin, has been used as poison and therapeutically as part of traditional oriental medicine. Some flowers of certain species such as Hemerocallis citrina are used in Chinese cuisine. They are sold fresh or dried in Asian markets as gum jum (金针 in Chinese; pinyin: jīn zhēn) or yellow flower vegetables (黃花菜 in Chinese; pinyin: huáng huā cài). These are used in hot and sour soup, daylily soup (金針花湯), Buddha's delight, and moo shu pork. The tubers and young leaves of H. fulva can be eaten raw or cooked. The flowers are more palatable upon cooking.

Moreover, Daylilies are among the most popular North American garden plants. Registered cultivars of Hemerocallis now exceed 38,000, including more than 13,000 named clones of H. fulva.

== See also ==
- Arlow Stout – pioneer in the hybridization of daylilies
- Contarinia quinquenotata – daylily gall midge
- Hemerocallis 'Duke of Durham'
- Siloam daylilies – over 450 daylily cultivars registered by Pauline Henry.
- List of plants known as lily
