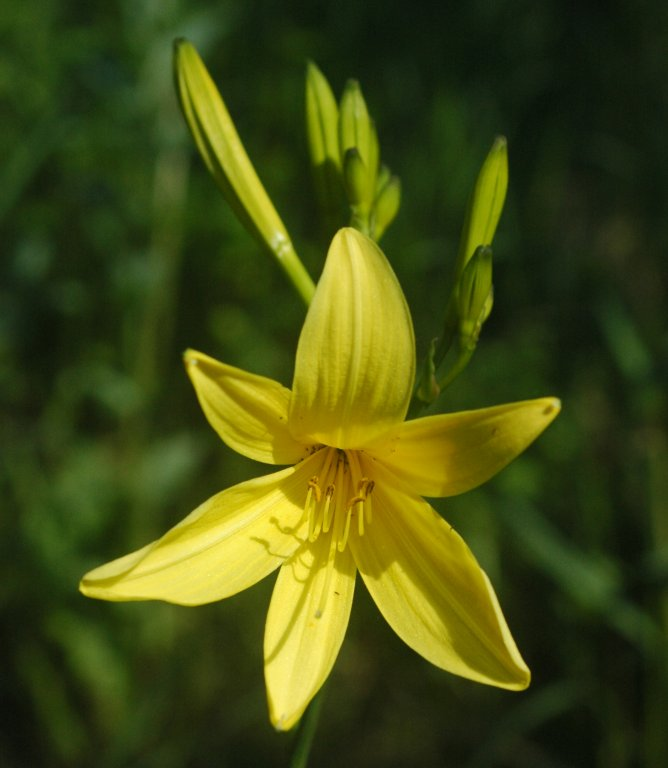

Scientific classification
- Kingdom: Plantae
- Clade: Tracheophytes
- Clade: Angiosperms
- Clade: Monocots
- Order: Asparagales
- Family: Asphodelaceae
- Subfamily: Hemerocallidoideae
- Genus: Hemerocallis
- Species: H. lilioasphodelus

Binomial name
- Hemerocallis lilioasphodelus L.

= Hemerocallis lilioasphodelus =

Lemon daylily

Species of flowering plant

Hemerocallis lilioasphodelus (syn. Hemerocallis flava, known as lemon daylily, lemon lily, yellow daylily, and other names) is a plant of the genus Hemerocallis. It is found in China, northeastern Italy, and Slovenia. It was also one of the first daylilies used for breeding new daylily cultivars.

Hemerocallis lilioasphodelus grows in big, spreading clumps, and its leaves grow to 75 cm (30 in) long. Its scapes each bear from 3 through 9 sweetly fragrant, lemon-yellow flowers.

== Culinary use ==
The flowers of some daylillies, including Hemerocallis lilioasphodelus are edible and are used in Chinese and Japanese cuisine.

== Gallery ==
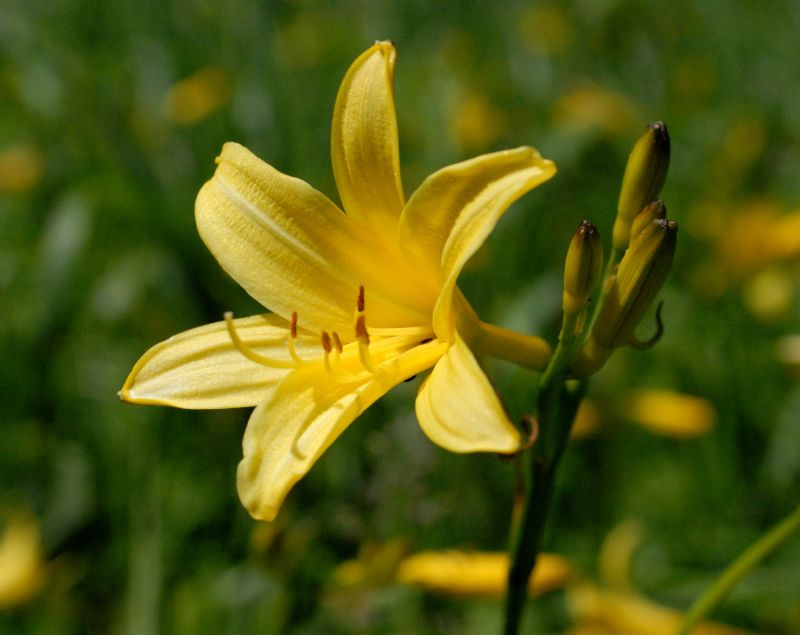
Hemerocallis lilioasphodelus

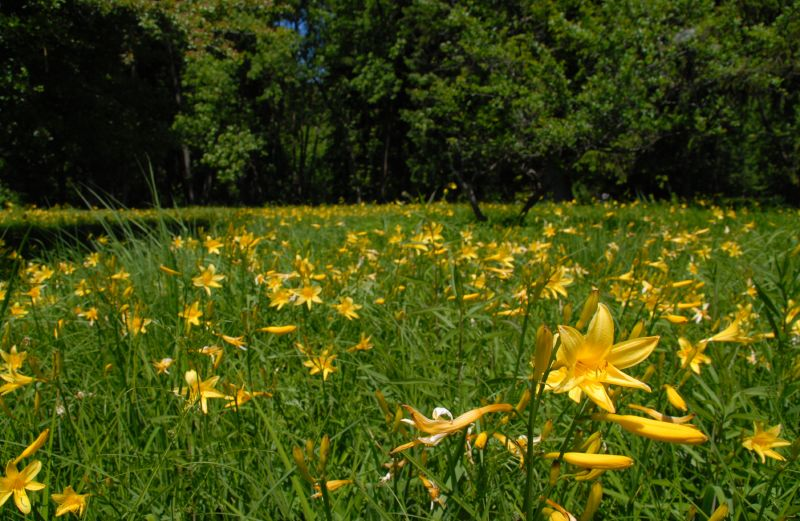
Hemerocallis lilioasphodelus

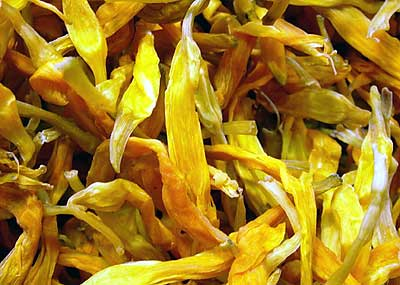
Dried golden needles

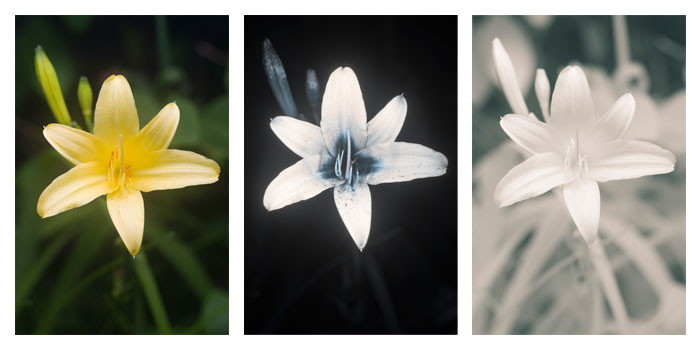
Comparison showing flower in visible light, ultraviolet, and infrared. Note the nectar guide pattern visible in UV

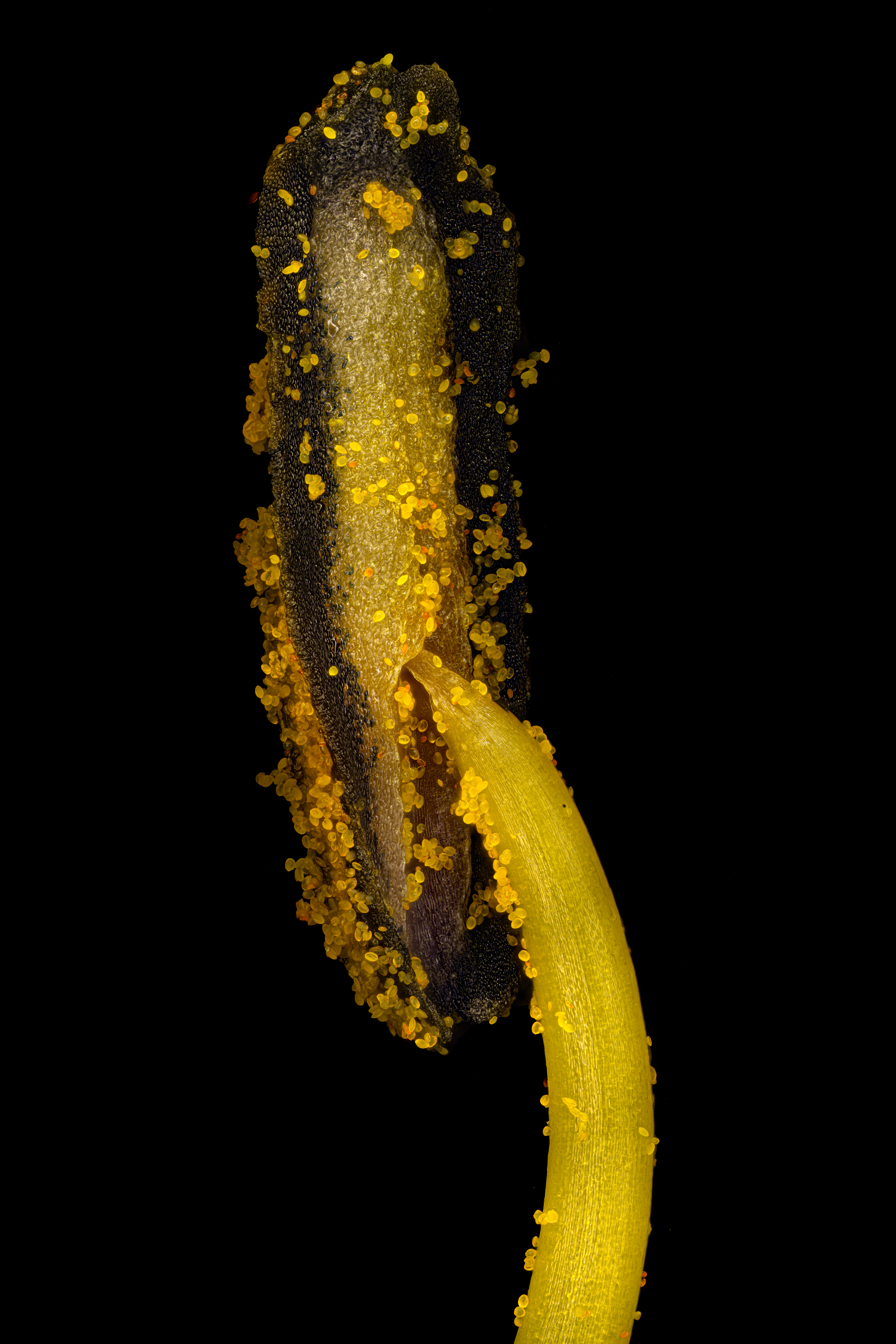
Hemerocallis lilioasphodelus Stamen under the microscope. Magnification x9
