= Hemerocallis yezoensis =

Scientific classification
- Kingdom: Plantae
- Clade: Tracheophytes
- Clade: Angiosperms
- Clade: Monocots
- Order: Asparagales
- Family: Asphodelaceae
- Subfamily: Hemerocallidoideae
- Genus: Hemerocallis
- Species: H. yezoensis

Binomial name
- Hemerocallis yezoensis H.Hara

Plant species

Hemerocallis yezoensis (Japanese: エゾキスゲ, romanized: ezokisuge, Russian: Красоднев иезский, romanized: Krasodnev iyezskiy) is a species of plant in the genus Hemerocallis, native to eastern Hokkaido and the southernmost extremities of the Kuril Islands.

== Description ==
Hemerocallis yezoensis is a perennial species of plant with a cespitose basal rosette of linear leaves and multiple inflorescences consisting of large, yellow flowers on a narrowly branching stem. It grows to a height of 0.75 m (30 inches).

== Range ==
Hemerocallis yezoensis has been reported in eastern Hokkaido and the southern point of Kunashir Island of the Kuril Island chain.

== Habitat ==
Hemerocallis yezoensis grows in fields and other open areas in full sun. It blooms in July through August.

== Etymology ==
The specific epithet "yezoensis" is derived from the word "Ezo", a historical term used to describe the Japanese Islands north of Honshu.
