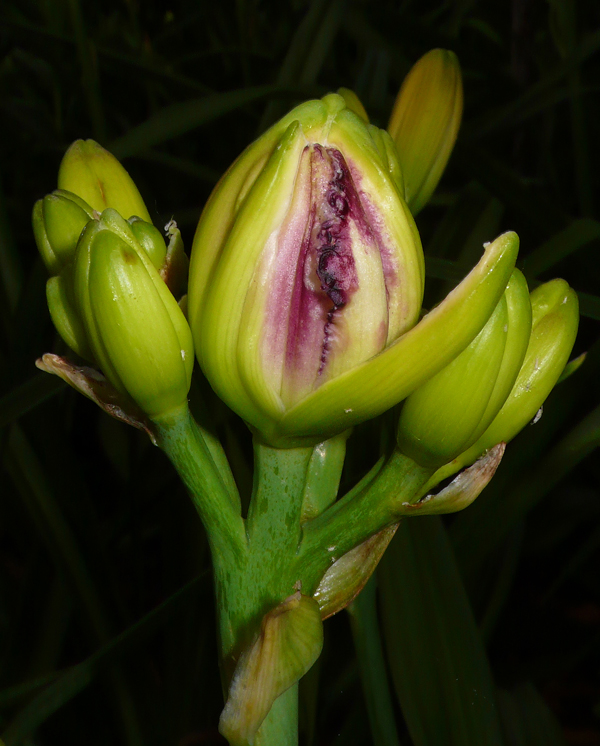
- Damage to the bud of a Hemerocallis flower from larvae of C. quinquenotata

Scientific classification
- Kingdom: Animalia
- Phylum: Arthropoda
- Class: Insecta
- Order: Diptera
- Family: Cecidomyiidae
- Genus: Contarinia
- Species: C. quinquenotata

Binomial name
- Contarinia quinquenotata Loew 1888

= Contarinia quinquenotata =

Species of fly

Contarinia quinquenotata is a small midge which infests the flower buds of Hemerocallis, causing the buds to swell, remain closed and rot. It is a pest in several parts of the world. It is known by the common names of daylily gall midge and hemerocallis gall midge.

== Description ==
Adults are tiny greyish-brown midges about 2 mm long. Females deposit their eggs with their long, penetrating ovipositors on developing Hemerocallis flower buds during May through early July although this may vary by location. This fly is difficult to see when it is flying.

== Life cycle ==
This fly is univoltine, having only one annual cycle. It mates shortly after emerging from its overwintering cocoon. Females lay eggs on developing Hemerocallis buds which hatch into 2-mm-long, elongate, legless white larvae. Their presence and feeding causes distortion of bud tissues and failure of buds to open. Infested buds characteristically become more globular than normal, tepals within buds become thickened, and a watery liquid is present between the tepals in which the larvae live. A few through hundreds of larvae live within a single bud. Larvae emerge from disfigured buds and enter the soil in which they pupate, spend the winter as pupae, and emerge as adults in the following spring.

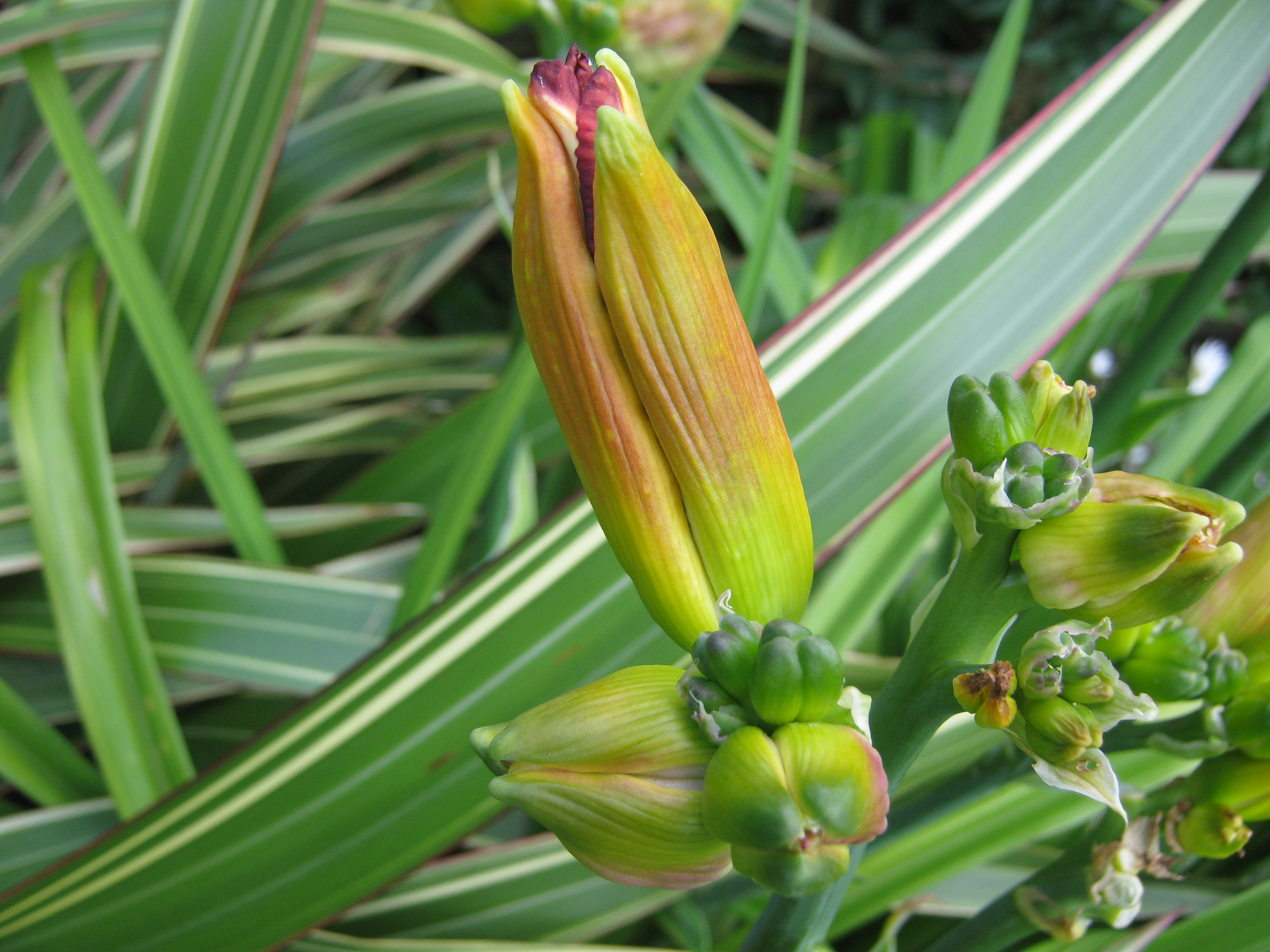
Buds of a Hemerocallis cultivar with a short globular bud (lower left) distorted by infestation of the hemerocallis gall midge, compared with normal cylindrical bud at centre

== Distribution ==
Contarinia quinquenotata possibly originated in Asia where wild Hemerocallis are native although it was first recorded in Europe in the 1800s. The midge has been slowly spreading across the world in infested Hemerocallis plants and soil. This fly was first noted in the United Kingdom in 1989 and has now spread to many parts of the United Kingdom. It was first reported in Canada in 2001 and has spread into the USA.

The spread is assumed to occur from larvae within buds of imported plants or the soil in plant containers.

== Commercial impact ==
Devaluation of infested plants by their failure to produce the attractive flowers favoured by gardeners for their colourful displays. Plants can safely be shipped only without their flower scapes, flower buds, and flowers and with bare roots. The need to control the midge by whatever means increases the cost of producing Hemerocallis plants.
