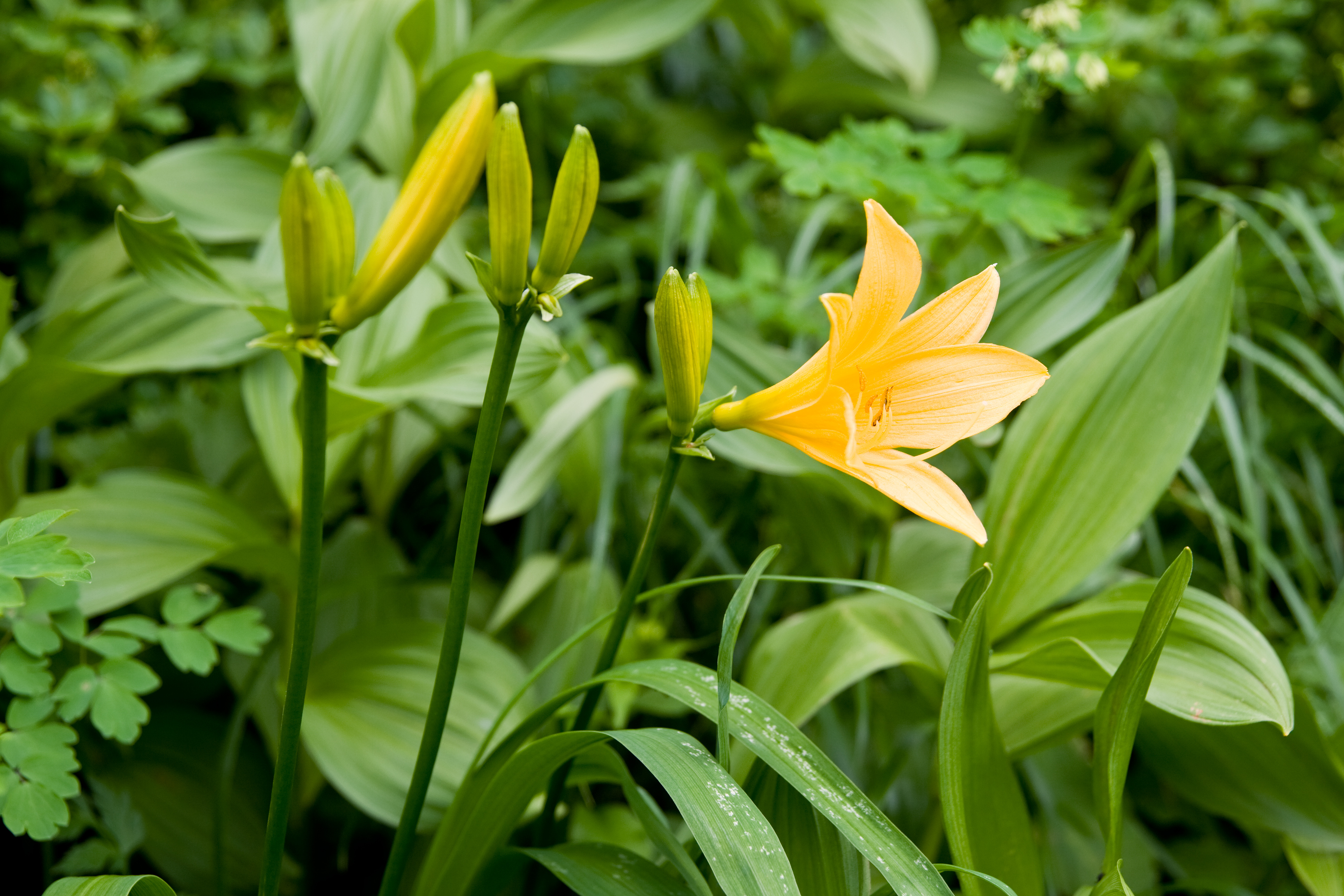

Scientific classification
- Kingdom: Plantae
- Clade: Tracheophytes
- Clade: Angiosperms
- Clade: Monocots
- Order: Asparagales
- Family: Asphodelaceae
- Subfamily: Hemerocallidoideae
- Genus: Hemerocallis
- Species: H. dumortieri

Binomial name
- Hemerocallis dumortieri C.Morren

= Hemerocallis dumortieri =

Species of flowering plant

Hemerocallis dumortieri is a species of plant in the family Asphodelaceae. It is native to Korea and possibly parts of China, and has been introduced into Japan. Hemerocallis dumortieri var. esculenta is native to Hokkaidō.
