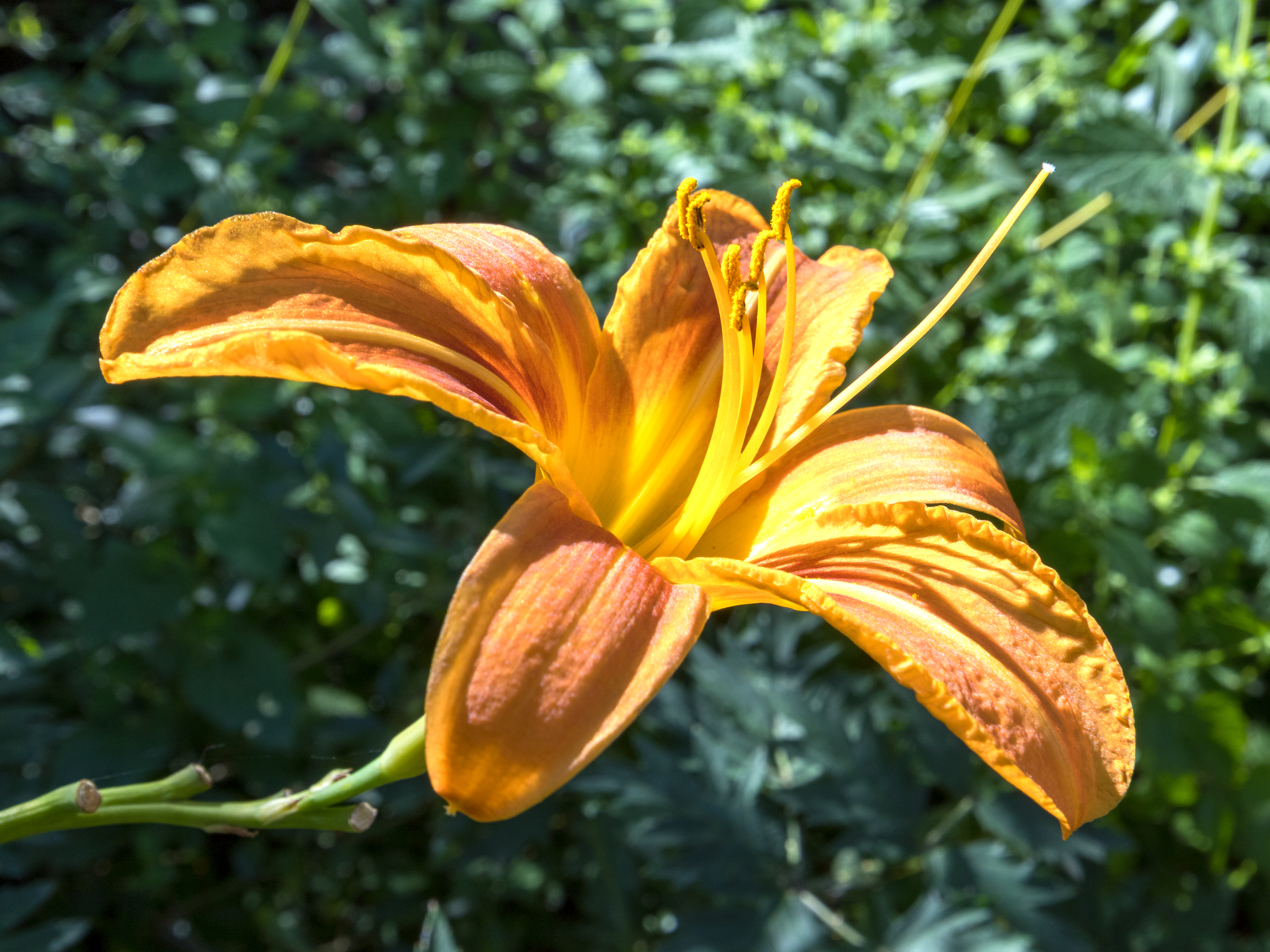
- Flower of Hemerocallis fulva var. fulva

Scientific classification
- Kingdom: Plantae
- Clade: Tracheophytes
- Clade: Angiosperms
- Clade: Monocots
- Order: Asparagales
- Family: Asphodelaceae
- Subfamily: Hemerocallidoideae
- Genus: Hemerocallis
- Species: H. fulva

Binomial name
- Hemerocallis fulva (L.) L.

Synonyms
- Hemerocallis crocea Lam.; Gloriosa luxurians Lour. ex B.A.Gomes (syn. of H. fulva var. fulva); Hemerocallis fulva var. kwanso Regel

= Hemerocallis fulva =

Species of flowering plant

Hemerocallis fulva, the orange day-lily, tawny daylily, corn lily, tiger daylily, fulvous daylily, ditch lily or Fourth of July lily (also railroad daylily, roadside daylily, outhouse lily, track lily, and wash-house lily), is a species of daylily native to Asia. It is very widely grown as an ornamental plant in temperate climates for its showy flowers and ease of cultivation. It is not a true lily in the genus Lilium, but gets its common name from the superficial similarity of its flowers to Lilium and from the fact that each flower lasts only one day.

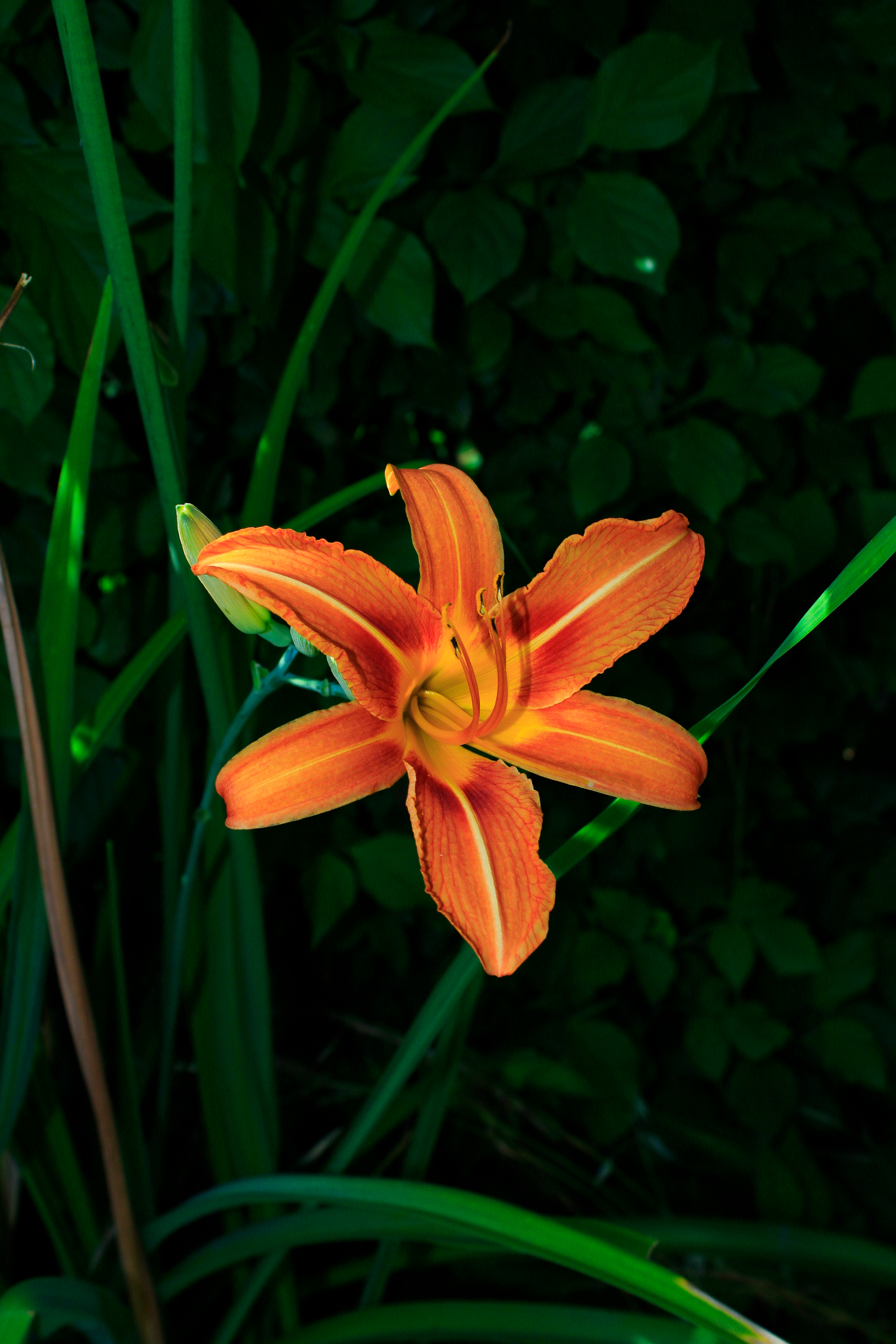
Orange day-lily in Tashkent Botanical Garden

== Etymology ==
The genus name Hemerocallis is from Ancient Greek: ἡμεροκαλλές hēmerokallés, literally, beautiful [for a] day (from Ancient Greek: ἡμέρα hēméra - day, and Ancient Greek: κάλλος kállos - beautiful). In Ancient Greek, it referred to martagon lily and describes the daily nature of flower opening.

The species name is from Latin: fulva meaning reddish yellow in reference to the flower's color.

== Description ==
It is an herbaceous perennial plant growing from tuberous roots, with stems 40–150 centimetres (16–59 inches) tall. The leaves are linear, 0.5–1.5 metres (1 1/2–5 feet) long and 1.5–3 cm (1/2–1 1/4 in) broad. The flowers are 5–12 cm (2–4 3/4 in) across, orange-red, with a pale central line on each tepal; they are produced from early summer through late autumn on scapes of ten through twenty flowers, with the individual flowers opening successively, each one lasting only one day. Its fruit is a three-valved capsule 2–2.5 cm (3/4–1 in) long and 1.2–1.5 cm (1/2–5/8 in) broad which splits open at maturity and releases seeds.

Both diploid and triploid forms occur in the wild, but most cultivated plants are triploids which rarely produce seeds and primarily reproduce vegetatively by stolons. At least four botanical varieties are recognized, including the typical triploid var. fulva, the diploid, long-flowered var. angustifolia (syn.: var. longituba), the triploid var. Flore Pleno, which has petaloid stamens, and the evergreen var. aurantiaca.

== Distribution ==
Orange daylily is native to Asia from the Caucasus east through the Himalaya through China, Japan, and Korea. Orange daylily persists where planted, making them a very good garden plant.

Hemerocallis fulva var. fulva has escaped from cultivation across much of the United States and parts of Canada and has become a weedy or invasive species. It persists also where dumped and spreads more or less rapidly by vegetative increase into woods and fields and along roadsides and ditches, hence its common name ditch lily. It forms dense stands that exclude native vegetation, and is often mistaken for a native species.

Hemerocallis fulva is an invasive non-native plant in parts of the United States and is included on lists of plants to avoid planting in some states, including Delaware, Maryland, Virginia and other mid-Atlantic states.

== Cultivation ==
Hemerocallis fulva has been cultivated in Europe, and naturalized in many countries there, since at least the 16th century. Several modern cultivars exist which are grown as ornamental plants. As most of the varieties in cultivation are sterile triploids, and all spread via subterranean bulb offsets, the most common (and simplest) method of propagation is by root- or bulb-division.

H. fulva are long-lived perennials, and are adaptable to a range of climatic conditions. The species is a vigorous grower in nearly any location, thriving even in difficult areas where other plants do not thrive. The plants grow well in full sun to open shade, and are drought tolerant. H. fulva is winter hardy to UDSA Zone 4.

All parts of Hemerocallis species are seriously and often fatally toxic to cats and somewhat toxic to dogs (as are all lilies in the "true lily" and "daylily" families). Cats are particularly vulnerable as their grooming behaviour causes them to lick accidentally transferred pollen from their fur.

== Uses ==
The flowers, leaves, and tubers of H. fulva are edible. The leaves and shoots can be eaten raw or cooked when very young, lest they become too fibrous. The flower petals and young tubers can also be eaten raw in salads, stir-fried, or otherwise cooked. The petals seem to taste better when cooked, but can also be fried for storing, or dried and used as a thickener in soups or sauces. The cooked flower buds, served with butter, taste like green beans or wax beans. The tubers are a good potato substitute, with a reportedly "nutty" flavor.

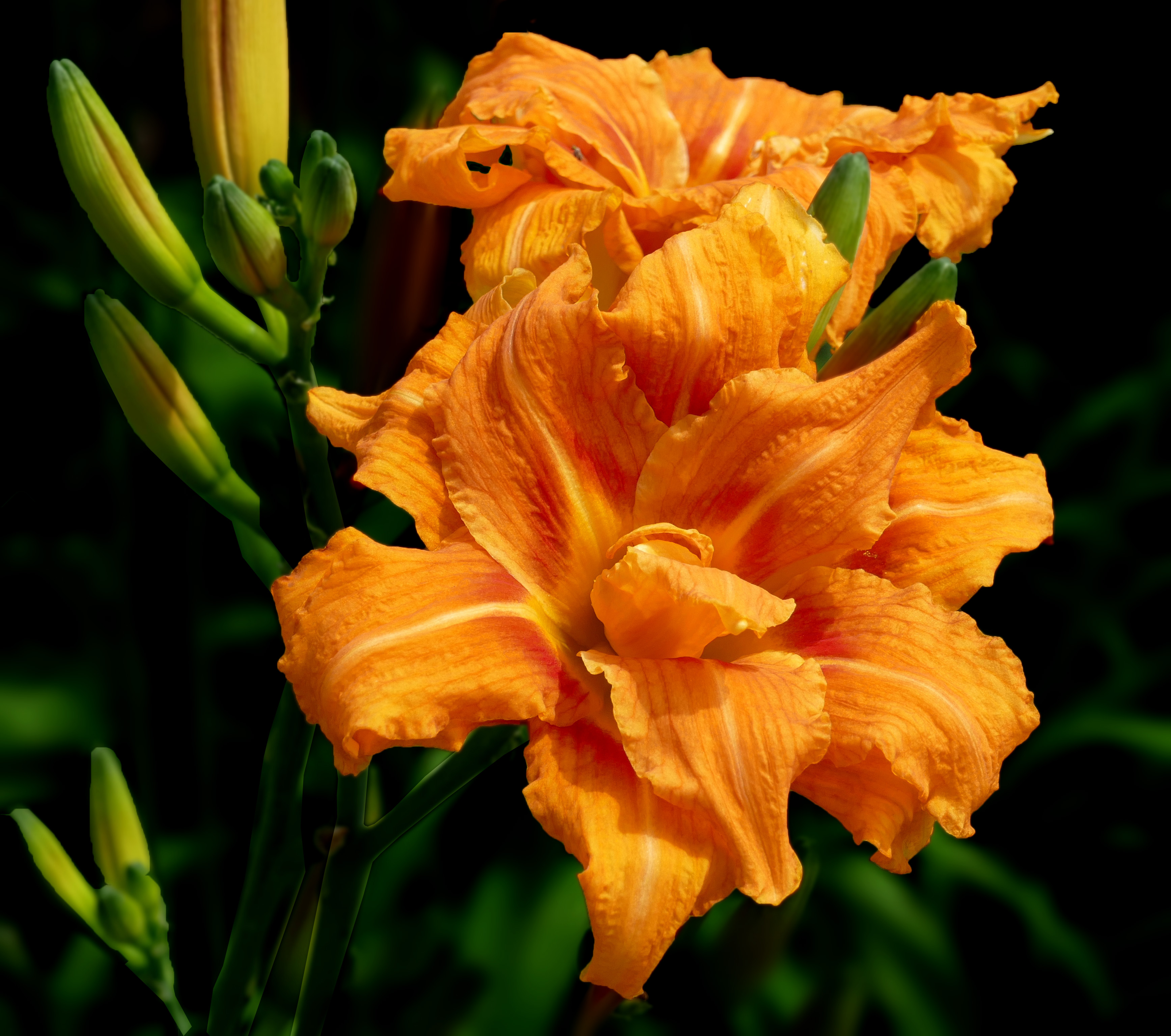
Hemerocallis fulva 'Flore Pleno'
