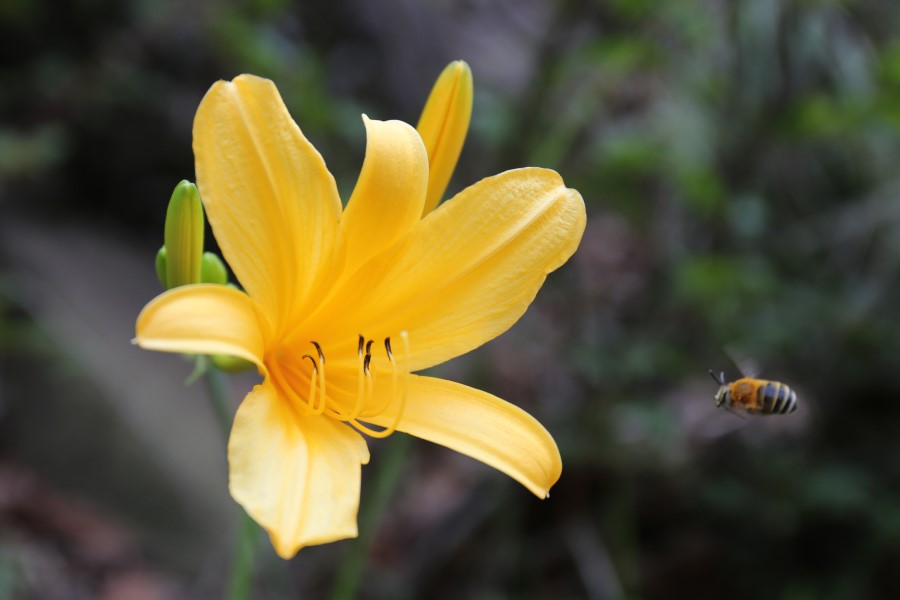

Scientific classification
- Kingdom: Plantae
- Clade: Tracheophytes
- Clade: Angiosperms
- Clade: Monocots
- Order: Asparagales
- Family: Asphodelaceae
- Subfamily: Hemerocallidoideae
- Genus: Hemerocallis
- Species: H. hakuunensis

Binomial name
- Hemerocallis hakuunensis Nakai

Synonyms
- Hemerocallis micrantha Nakai; Hemerocallis hongdoensis M.G.Chung & S.S.Kang; Hemerocallis taeanensis S.S.Kang & M.G.Chung

= Hemerocallis hakuunensis =

Species of flowering plant

Hemerocallis hakuunensis, known as Baekunsan daylily, is a species in the family Asphodelaceae, native to Korea, and Japan.

This plant was first described by Takenoshin Nakai in 1943

Its Korean name is Baegunsan wonchuri (백운산원추리). Baegunsan (백운산) is the name of several mountains. The word wonchuri (원추리) refers to a variety of daylily species in Korean, and H. hakuunensis is the most commonly encountered and gastronomically consumed daylily species in Korea.
