= Hemerocallis 'Duke of Durham' =

Hybrid lily

- Genus: Hemerocallis
- Hybrid parentage: 'Sea Warrior' × 'Chocolate Pudding'
- Cultivar: 'Duke of Durham'
- Origin: Elliott, 1977

Hemerocallis 'Duke of Durham' is a hybrid daylily introduced in 1977 by Dr. Robert Day Elliott, Jr.

At the time of its introduction, the color combination was unusual, and the flower won Dr. Elliott his first award from the American Hemerocallis Society, a Junior Citation in 1977 for "new cultivars that appear to have outstanding qualities and distinction". This was followed by an Honorable Mention Award in 1980. Today 'Duke of Durham' can be found growing throughout the United States and Canada. It thrives in a wide range of temperature zones and is still used to breed healthy new cultivars, although because rust to brown tones have fallen into disfavor, it has lost prestige among hybridizers.
