= Allium prostratum =

Scientific classification
- Kingdom: Plantae
- Clade: Tracheophytes
- Clade: Angiosperms
- Clade: Monocots
- Order: Asparagales
- Family: Amaryllidaceae
- Subfamily: Allioideae
- Genus: Allium
- Subgenus: A. subg. Rhizirideum
- Species: A. prostratum

Binomial name
- Allium prostratum L.C.Trevir. 1822 not Maxim. 1859

Synonyms
- Synonymy: Allium cernuum Schult. & Schult.f. 1830, illegitimate name not Roth 1798; Allium congestum G.Don; Allium declinatum Rchb. 1841, illegitimate name not Willd. 1827; Allium declinatum Willd. 1827; Allium deflexum Fisch. ex Kunth 1843, illegitimate name not Willd. 1799; Allium fischeri Besser ex Schult. & Schult.f. 1830 not Regel 1875; Allium satoanum Kitag.; Allium stellerianum var. prostratum (Trevir.) Regel

Species of flowering plant

Allium prostratum is an Asian species of wild onion native to Siberia (Zabaykalsky Krai, Buryatia, Yakutia), Mongolia, Inner Mongolia, and Xinjiang. It grows in sunlit locations on steppes and rocky slopes.

Allium prostratum spreads by means of a robust horizontal rhizome. It produces 1 or 2 bulbs up to 10 mm in diameter. Scape is up to 25 cm tall. Leaves are tubular, shorter than the scape. Umbel is hemispheric, with purple flowers.
