= Baegunsan (Jeonnam-Gwangju) =

Mountain in South Korea

Highest point
- Elevation: 1,222 m (4,009 ft)
- Prominence: 1,089 m (3,573 ft)
- Listing: Ribu, Mountains of Korea
- Coordinates: 35°06′23″N 127°37′18″E

Geography
- Country: South Korea
- Provincial-level city: South Jeolla
- Parent range: Sobaek Mountains

Korean name
- Hangul: 백운산
- Hanja: 白雲山
- RR: Baegunsan
- MR: Paegunsan

Baegunsan (Korean: 백운산) is a mountain in Jeonnam-Gwangju, South Korea. Its area extends across Gwangyang. Baegunsan has an elevation of 1,222 metres (4,009 ft).
