= Moo shu pork =

American Chinese dish

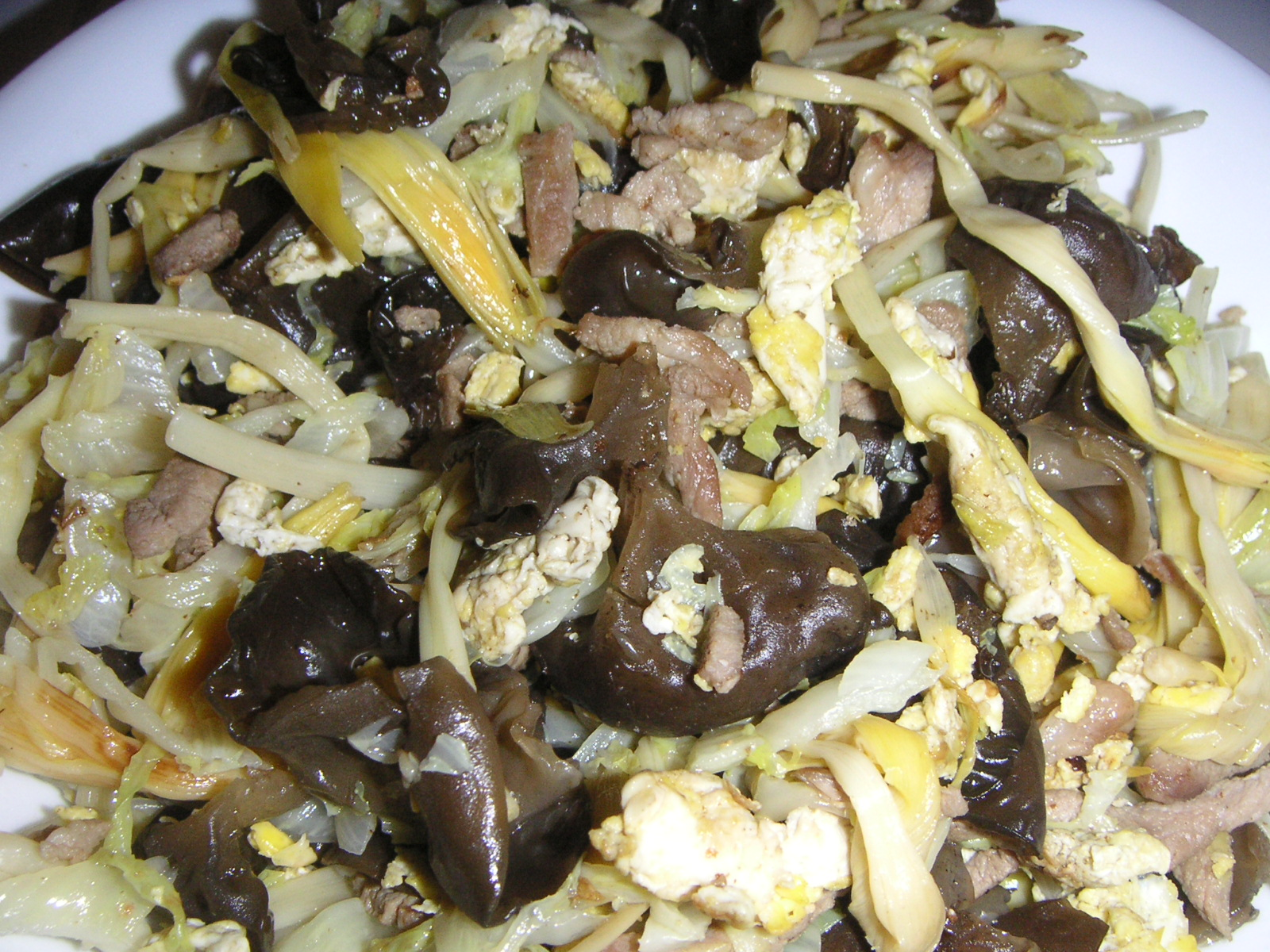
- Traditional Chinese: 木須肉
- Simplified Chinese: 木须肉
Transcriptions
Standard Mandarin
- Hanyu Pinyin: mù xū ròu
- Wade–Giles: mu^{4} hsü^{1} jou^{4}

Alternative Chinese name
- Chinese: 木樨肉
Transcriptions
Standard Mandarin
- Hanyu Pinyin: mù xī ròu
- Wade–Giles: mu^{4} hsi^{1} jou^{4}

Moo shu pork or mu shu (Chinese: 木須肉), originally spelled moo shi pork (Chinese: 木樨肉) is a dish of northern Chinese origin, originating from Shandong. It invariably contains egg, whose yellow color is reminiscent of blossoms of the osmanthus tree, after which the dish is named.

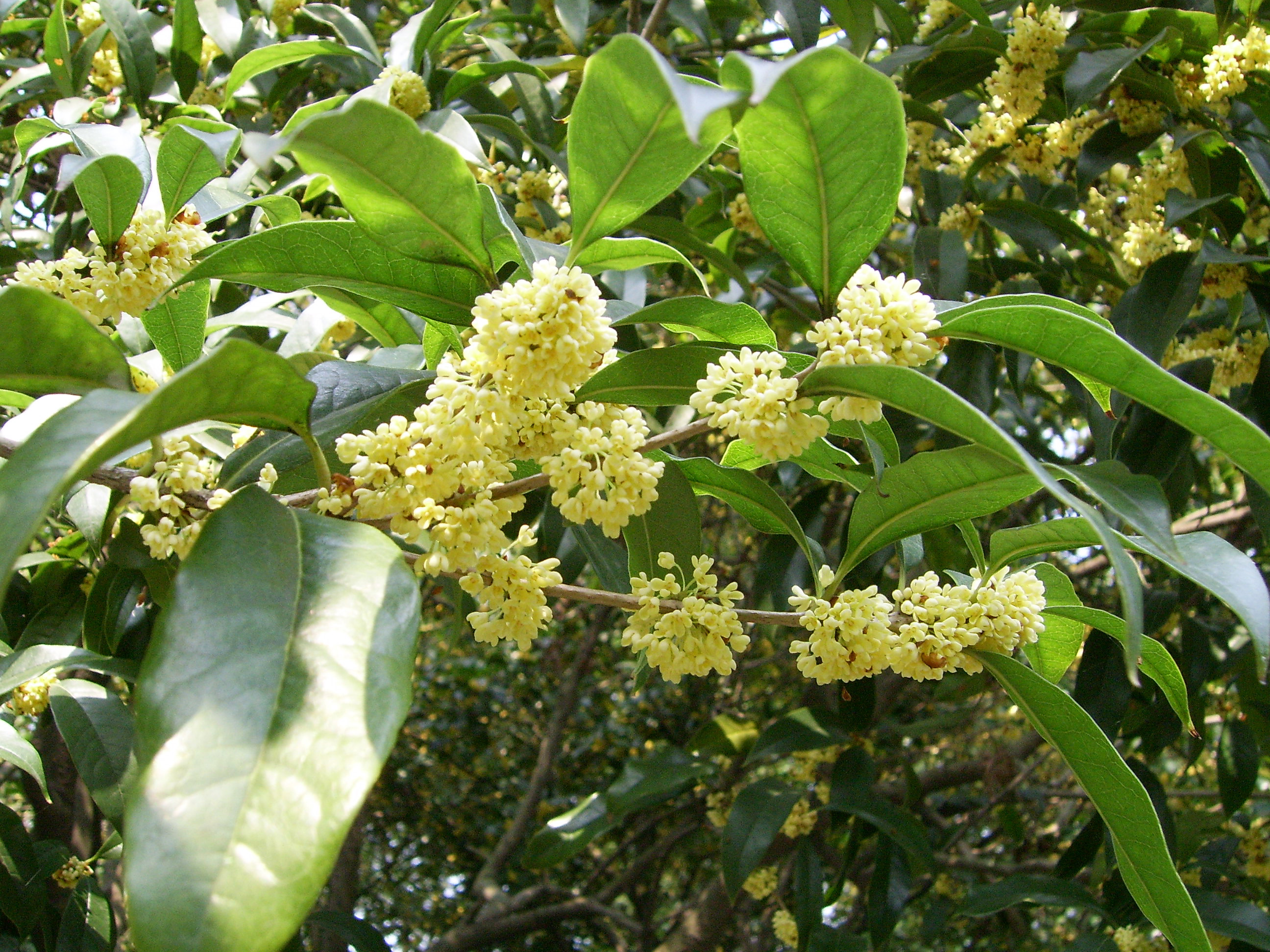
Blossoms of the sweet osmanthus tree (resemble scrambled eggs)

== Description ==
=== Chinese ===
In its traditional Chinese version, moo shu pork consists of sliced pork tenderloin, cucumber, and scrambled eggs, stir-fried in lard together with bite-sized cuttings of wood ear mushrooms (black fungus). Historically the original dish in Shandong Confucius family cuisine contained bamboo shoots. It was adapted into normal commercial in Shandong province also Beijing cuisine replacing bamboo with rehydrated dried daylily blossoms. When home-cooked either may be replaced with cucumber. The dish is seasoned with minced ginger and garlic, scallions, soy sauce, and rice cooking wine (usually huangjiu). The dish is traditionally eaten by itself.

=== American Chinese ===
In American Chinese cuisine, the dish is prepared with julienned pork, cabbage, scrambled egg, carrots, and wood ear mushrooms (black fungus). Hoisin sauce is painted on the inside of a thin flour-and-water pancake, or recently, sometimes, a Mexican tortilla, which is then used to wrap the filling.

In the United States, the dish seems to have appeared in Chinese restaurants in New York City and Washington, D.C., in approximately 1966, receiving mention in a New York Times guide to Washington restaurants published that year. One of the first restaurants in Manhattan to serve the dish was Pearl's, one of the best known New York City Chinese restaurants to serve non-Cantonese food in the 1960s. A 1967 article in The New York Times states that another of the first restaurateurs to serve the dish in Manhattan was Emily Kwoh, the owner of the Mandarin House, Mandarin East, and Great Shanghai restaurants.

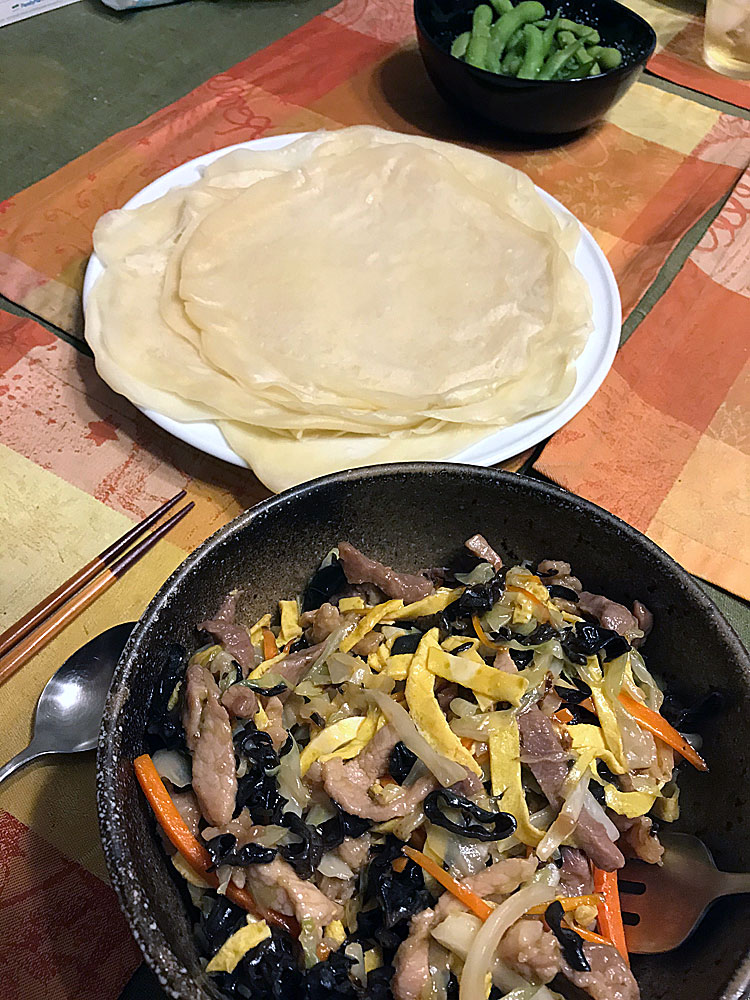
American-style moo shu pork, with pancakes, ready to wrap

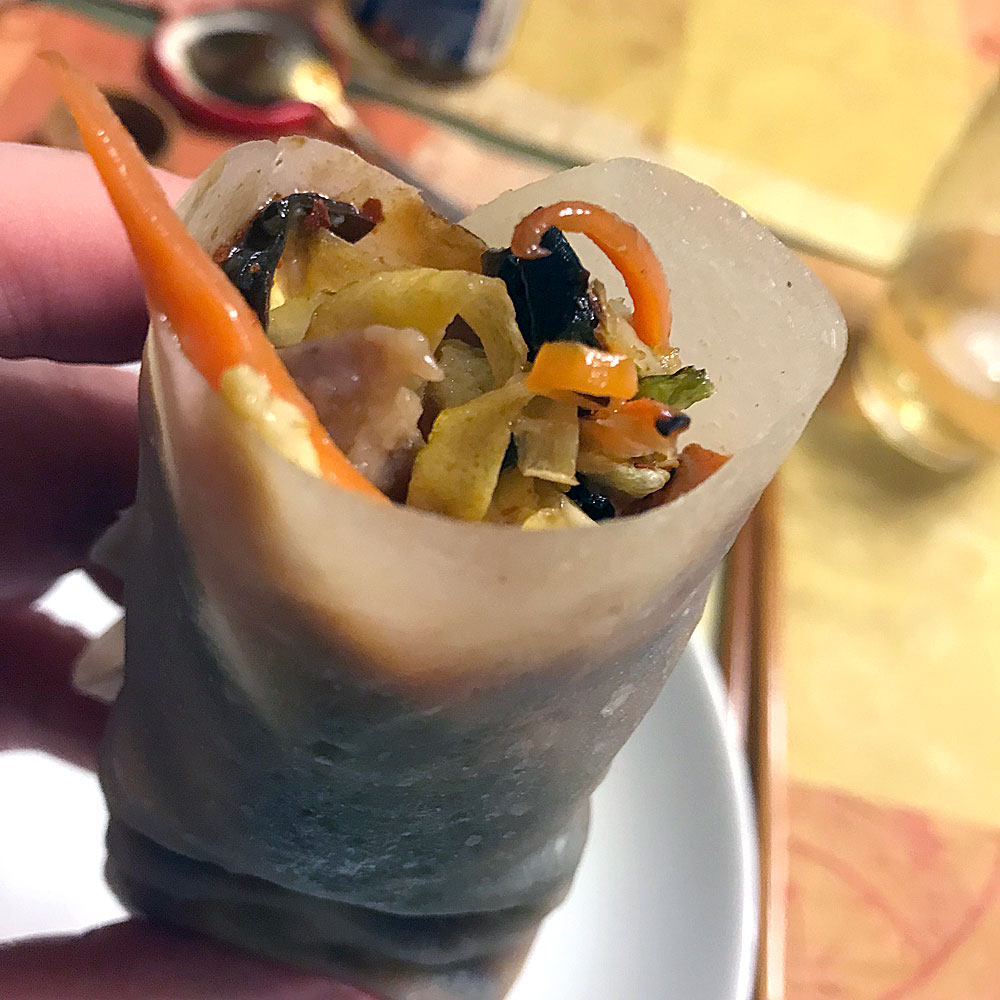
American-style moo shu pork, wrapped in pancakes

== Etymology ==
There are two competing histories regarding how the name of this dish is written and explained.

One story gives the name as 木犀肉 (pinyin: mù xī ròu). The last character 肉 (ròu) means "meat" and refers to the pork in the dish. The first part 木犀 (mù xī) is the name for the sweet osmanthus, a small ornamental tree that produces bunches of small and fragrant blossoms that may be yellow or white. Scrambled eggs have an appearance that remind people of the mixed yellow and white flowers, so 木犀 (mù xī) is a poetic way of referring to the scrambled eggs used in preparing this dish. Additionally, at Chinese Confucian death anniversary celebrations, the Chinese word for "egg" (蛋; pinyin: dàn) is avoided when referring to dishes containing eggs, as many Chinese curses contain this word. Thus, the word dàn was typically substituted using the euphemism "sweet osmanthus." By this reasoning, in this version of the dish's name, the first character, 木 (mù) is short for 木耳 (mù'ěr, meaning "wood ear fungus") and 樨 (xī, meaning "sweet osmanthus tree") is short for 桂花 (guíhuā, meaning "sweet osmanthus flower").

The second way of writing the name of this dish that is commonly seen in Chinese restaurants in the United States is 木须肉 (pinyin: mù xū ròu). The second character 须 (xū) means "whiskers," and is often given an additional determinative component in writing (to distinguish the meaning of "whiskers" from the other meanings of 須) so that it comes to be written as 鬚. It is possible that 木須肉 (literally "wood whiskers pork") might have been used on the menus of the first American Chinese restaurants to serve the dish in place of the correct compound 木樨肉 ("sweet osmanthus pork") due to haste or simply because of the limitations of Chinese typewriters. It may also merely have been the result of writing the wrong character with a similar pronunciation.

Two additional explanations of the name have unclear origins and may be examples of folk etymology: there is a neighborhood with a similar name in Beijing called Muxidi (木樨地), which is home to the Muxidi station (木樨地站). The dish is also occasionally also called 苜蓿肉 (mùsù ròu) meaning "alfalfa meat".

== See also ==
- List of pork dishes
