= Baegunsan (North Chungcheong and Gangwon) =

Mountain in South Korea

Highest point
- Elevation: 1,085.7 m (3,562 ft)

Geography
- Location: South Korea

Korean name
- Hangul: 백운산
- Hanja: 白雲山
- RR: Baegunsan
- MR: Paegunsan

Baegunsan (Korean: 백운산) is a mountain between the provinces of Gangwon Province and North Chungcheong Province in South Korea. Its area extends into the cities of Wonju and Jecheon. It has an elevation of 1,085.7 m (3,562 ft).

== See also ==
- List of mountains in Korea
