= Baegunsan (South Gyeongsang and North Jeolla) =

Mountain in South Korea

Highest point
- Elevation: 1,279 m (4,196 ft)

Geography
- Location: North Jeolla Province, South Korea

Korean name
- Hangul: 백운산
- Hanja: 白雲山
- RR: Baegunsan
- MR: Paegunsan

Baegunsan (Korean: 백운산) is a mountain of North Jeolla Province, western South Korea. It has an elevation of 1,279 metres.

== See also ==
- List of mountains of Korea
