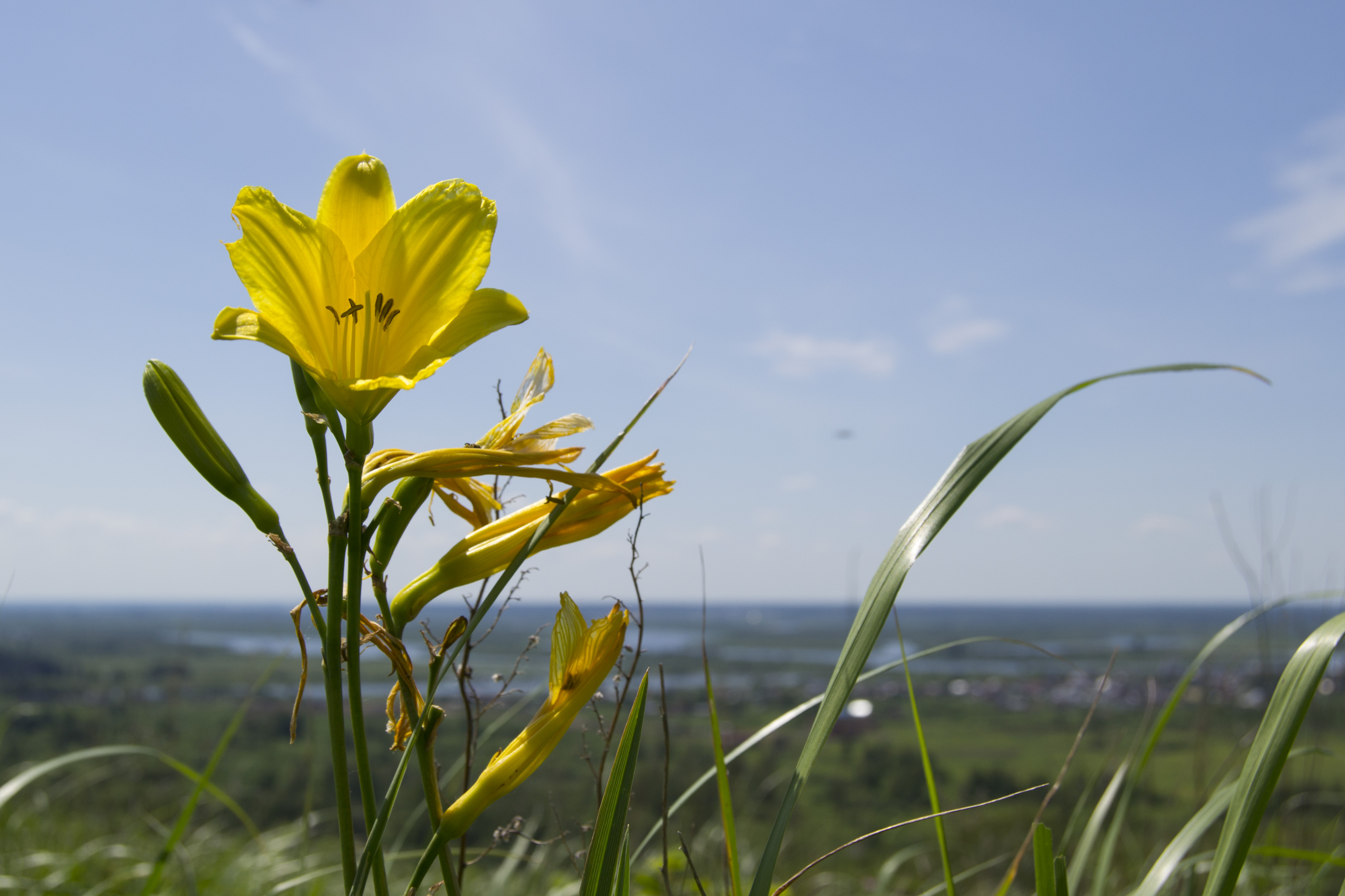

Scientific classification
- Kingdom: Plantae
- Clade: Tracheophytes
- Clade: Angiosperms
- Clade: Monocots
- Order: Asparagales
- Family: Asphodelaceae
- Subfamily: Hemerocallidoideae
- Genus: Hemerocallis
- Species: H. minor

Binomial name
- Hemerocallis minor Mill.

= Hemerocallis minor =

Species of flowering plant

Hemerocallis minor, is also known as dwarf daylily, grassleaf lily and small daylily. It is native to northern Asia (Siberia, Mongolia, China, Korea). The plant grows up through 0.5 m high. Its wide yellow flowers are scentless. It is a hermaphroditic species, pollinated by insects such as honey bees.

In China, the flowers are eaten as a traditional food.

== Propagation ==
Propagation is by seed, which Hemerocallis minor produces in capsules, and by dividing clumps.
