= Baegunsan (Jeongseon and Pyeongchang) =

Mountain in Gangwon Province, South Korea

Highest point
- Elevation: 883 m (2,897 ft)
- Listing: Mountains of Korea
- Coordinates: 37°17′57″N 128°34′48″E

Geography
- Country: South Korea
- Province: Gangwon
- Counties: Jeongseon and Pyeongchang

Korean name
- Hangul: 백운산
- Hanja: 白雲山
- RR: Baegunsan
- MR: Paegunsan

Baegunsan (Korean: 백운산) is a mountain in Gangwon Province, South Korea. Its area extends across the counties of Jeongseon and Pyeongchang. Baegunsan has an elevation of 883 m (2,897 ft).
