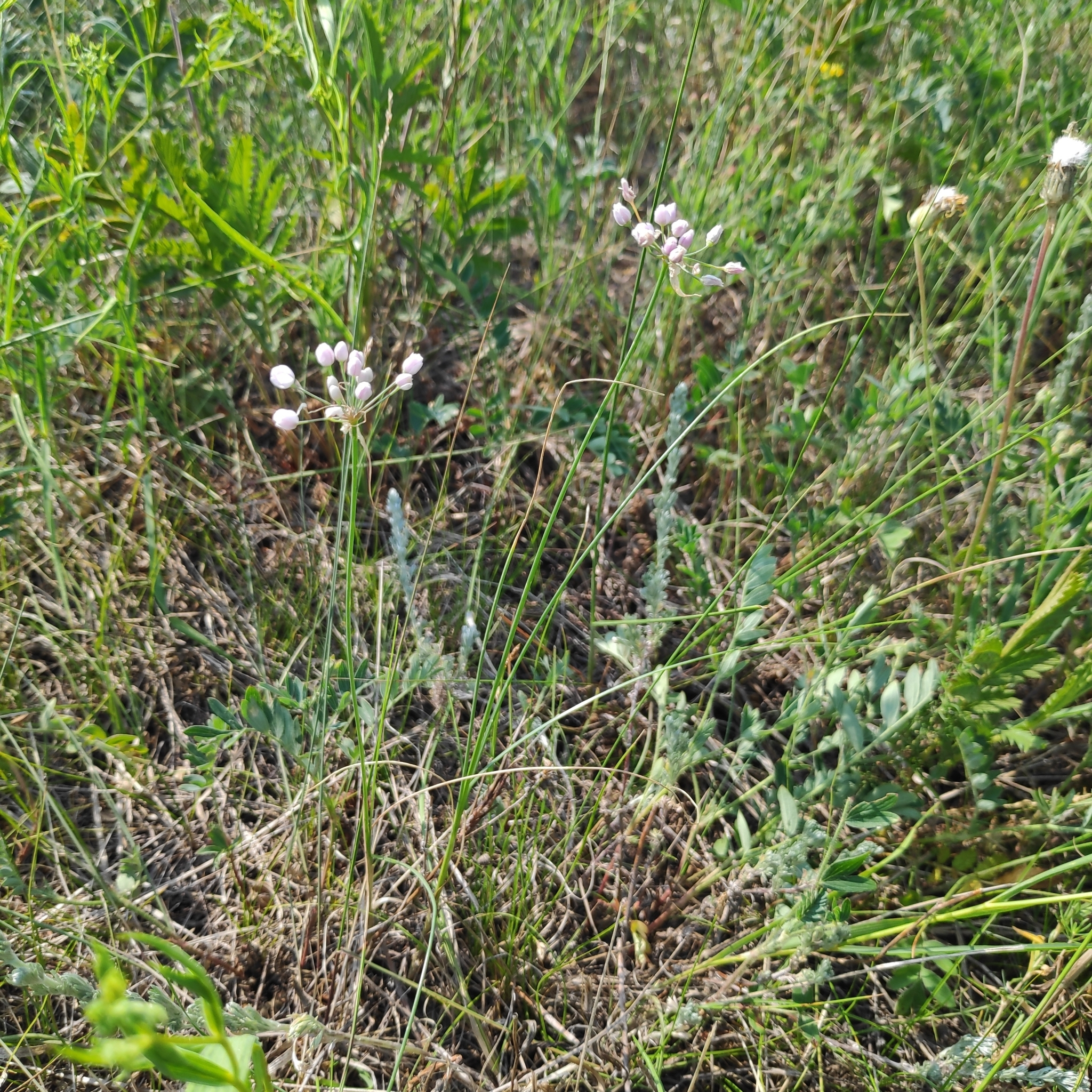

Scientific classification
- Kingdom: Plantae
- Clade: Tracheophytes
- Clade: Angiosperms
- Clade: Monocots
- Order: Asparagales
- Family: Amaryllidaceae
- Subfamily: Allioideae
- Genus: Allium
- Subgenus: A. subg. Rhizirideum
- Species: A. anisopodium

Binomial name
- Allium anisopodium Ledeb.

Synonyms
- Allium anisopodium subsp. argunense Peschkova; Allium tchefouense Debeaux; Allium tenuissimum var. anisopodium (Ledeb.) Regel; Allium tenuissimum subsp. anisopodium (Ledeb.) Printz

= Allium anisopodium =

Species of plant

Allium anisopodium, also called thread-leaf chive, is a species of plant native to Siberia, the Russian Far East, Korea, Kazakhstan, Mongolia, and northern China.

Allium anisopodium is a perennial herb with a scape (round in cross-section) up to 70 cm tall. Leaves are about the same length as the scape. Flowers are purple.

== Varieties ==
Two varieties are generally recognized:

Allium anisopodium var. anisopodium --- Leaves, scape and pedicels smooth

Allium anisopodium var. zimmermannianum (Gilg) F.T. Wang & T. Tan (syn: Allium zimmermannianum Gilg) --- Leaves, scape and pedicels with a rough surface
