= Siloam (disambiguation) =

Siloam most often refers to the ancient site of Silwan in Jerusalem. Articles directly related to Siloam in Jerusalem include:

- Pool of Siloam
- Siloam inscription
- Siloam tunnel
- Tower of Siloam

Siloam may also refer to:

== Places ==
In the United States

- Siloam, Colorado
- Siloam, Georgia
- Siloam, Illinois
- Siloam, New Jersey
- Siloam, North Carolina
- Siloam Township, Surry County, North Carolina
- Siloam, a hamlet in the town of Smithfield, New York

Elsewhere

- Siloam, Ontario, Canada

== Cemeteries ==
- Siloam Cemetery in New Jersey, United States
- Siloam, a section of Cemetery of the Evergreens in Brooklyn, NY

== Schools ==
- Siloam School (Charlotte, North Carolina), United States
- Siloam School (Eastover, South Carolina), United States

== Other uses ==
- Siloam Baptist Church in Alabama, United States
- Siloam daylilies, a type of flower

== See also ==
- Siloam Springs (disambiguation)
