= Youa =

Youa can refer to:

- A place in Guinea
- A character in Gran Torino
