= The Mule (2018 film) =

2018 film directed by Clint Eastwood

- Theatrical release poster
- Directed by: Clint Eastwood
- Screenplay by: Nick Schenk
- Based on: "The Sinaloa Cartel's 90-Year-Old Drug Mule" by Sam Dolnick
- Produced by: Clint Eastwood; Tim Moore; Kristina Rivera; Jessica Meier; Dan Friedkin; Bradley Thomas
- Starring: Clint Eastwood; Bradley Cooper; Laurence Fishburne; Michael Peña; Dianne Wiest; Andy García
- Cinematography: Yves Bélanger
- Edited by: Joel Cox
- Music by: Arturo Sandoval
- Production companies: Imperative Entertainment; Bron Creative; Malpaso Productions
- Distributed by: Warner Bros. Pictures
- Release dates: December 10, 2018 (Regency Village Theater); December 14, 2018 (United States)
- Running time: 116 minutes
- Country: United States
- Languages: English; Spanish
- Budget: $50 million
- Box office: $174.8 million

The Mule is a 2018 American crime drama film starring and directed by Clint Eastwood, and produced by Eastwood, Dan Friedkin, Jessica Meier, Tim Moore, Kristina Rivera, and Bradley Thomas. The screenplay, written by Nick Schenk, is based on the 2014 The New York Times article "The Sinaloa Cartel's 90-Year-Old Drug Mule" by Sam Dolnick, which recounts the story of Leo Sharp, a World War II veteran in his 80s who became a drug courier for the Sinaloa Cartel.

The film co-stars Bradley Cooper, Laurence Fishburne, Michael Peña, Dianne Wiest, and Andy García. This was Eastwood's first acting project since 2012, and his first starring leading role in a film directed by himself since 2008. Filming began in early June 2018, taking place in Atlanta and Augusta, Georgia, with other film locations in Las Cruces, New Mexico and Colorado.

The Mule was released in the United States on December 14, 2018, by Warner Bros. Pictures. It grossed over $174 million. The film received generally positive reviews, with critics calling it "poignant and charming" and praising Eastwood's performance.

== Plot ==
In 2005, Korean War veteran and celebrated daylily horticulturalist Earl Stone misses his daughter Iris's wedding so he can receive a lifetime award celebrating his professional accomplishments. Enraged that her father once again chose his career over her, Iris stops speaking to him and his wife Mary files for divorce.

Twelve years later, Earl visits his granddaughter Ginny to attend her wedding rehearsal, not telling his family that the only reason he's there is because his flower farming business has gone bankrupt, and his home has just been foreclosed on by the bank. While there, he is spotted by a member of a drug cartel who had been tipped off by one of Earl's former employees as to his financial problems. Earl accepts the gangster's offer and becomes a "mule", transporting cocaine through Illinois for the cartel.

Facing little suspicion due to his age, ethnicity, spotless criminal history, and strict adherence to driving laws, Earl is soon entrusted with huge amounts of drugs, the delivery of which earns him thousands of dollars. Over time, Earl gets more involved with the cartel and becomes one of their best mules. With the money he buys a new truck, buys back his home, and even pays for badly needed renovations on behalf of the local VFW post that had been damaged in a fire. Earl even pays for Ginny's wedding and tuition so she can attend college.

Meanwhile, Special Agent Colin Bates moves to the Chicago DEA office and is assigned Agent Trevino as his partner. They are tasked with closing in on the cartel's deliveries to Chicago. Bates and Trevino find an informant from within the cartel and start looking for their most profitable driver, Tata (“grandfather”). The head of the cartel, Latón, is overjoyed with Earl's success and invites him to a party. During the festivities, Earl dances with one of Latón's escorts before she leads him to a private bedroom; they are soon joined by another, and he engages in a sexual encounter with the two women. All the while, Earl mistakenly believes that the cartel considers him their friend. Things take a turn for the worse when Latón is assassinated and replaced by another gangster, Gustavo. Gustavo is more bloodthirsty and controlling than Latón and demands Earl be kept under tighter control.

In the middle of a $12 million cocaine shipment, Earl winds up in a diner with Bates. Neither man recognizes the other, and the elderly Earl gives Bates advice to try and mend fences with his wife and not make the mistakes Earl has made. Earl then leaves to conclude the delivery of the shipment but then gets a call from Ginny, who informs him that Mary is gravely ill. Earl initially tells Ginny there's nothing he can do until she rebukes him for his perceived lack of care. Earl relents and disobeys Gustavo, making peace with Mary and staying with her in her final moments. Mary dies peacefully days later. After attending the funeral and finally reconciling with Iris and the rest of his family, Earl resumes the delivery as both the DEA and the cartel close in on him.

The cartel's enforcers catch him and upon discovering that he disobeyed them to care for his ex-wife, they call Gustavo to request leniency. Gustavo tells them to kill Earl but the DEA, overhearing the conversation, send in air and ground units to interject. Earl appears in his truck alone, looking severely beaten and encounters the DEA agents who have set up a roadblock and arrest him; Bates has a pleasant aside with Earl before sending him away. In court, Earl's lawyer starts to give an impassioned plea, asking for mercy for Earl due to his age and military service, and implies he murdered Gustavo’s men. However, a clearly guilt-ridden Earl interrupts her to plead guilty to all charges and is promptly sent to federal prison. His family lend him their support and promise to visit him. In prison, he returns to horticulture.

== Cast ==
- Clint Eastwood as Earl Stone, a drug mule (based on Leo Sharp)
- Bradley Cooper as Colin Bates, a DEA agent (based on Jeff Moore)
- Laurence Fishburne as Warren Lewis, Bates' supervisor
- Michael Peña as Trevino, Bates' partner
- Dianne Wiest as Mary Stone, Earl's estranged ex-wife
- Ignacio Serricchio as Julio Gutierrez, Earl's cartel handler
- Andy García as Latón, a Cartel boss
- Taissa Farmiga as Ginny, Earl's granddaughter
  - Kinsley Isla Dillon as young Ginny
- Alison Eastwood as Iris, Earl's estranged daughter
- Richard Herd as Tim Kennedy
- Lobo Sebastian as Bug, a cartel enforcer
- Manny Montana as Axl
- Noel G. as Bald Rob
- Eugene Cordero as Luis Rocha, DEA informant inside the cartel
- Clifton Collins Jr. as Gustavo, who takes over from Latón
- Victor Rasuk as Rico, an attendee at Ginny's bridal party who offers Earl his first job
- Robert LaSardo as Emilio, Earl's first employer
- Daniel Moncada as Eduardo, a high-ranking cartel member
- Lee Coc as Assault Rifle Guy

== Production ==
=== Development ===
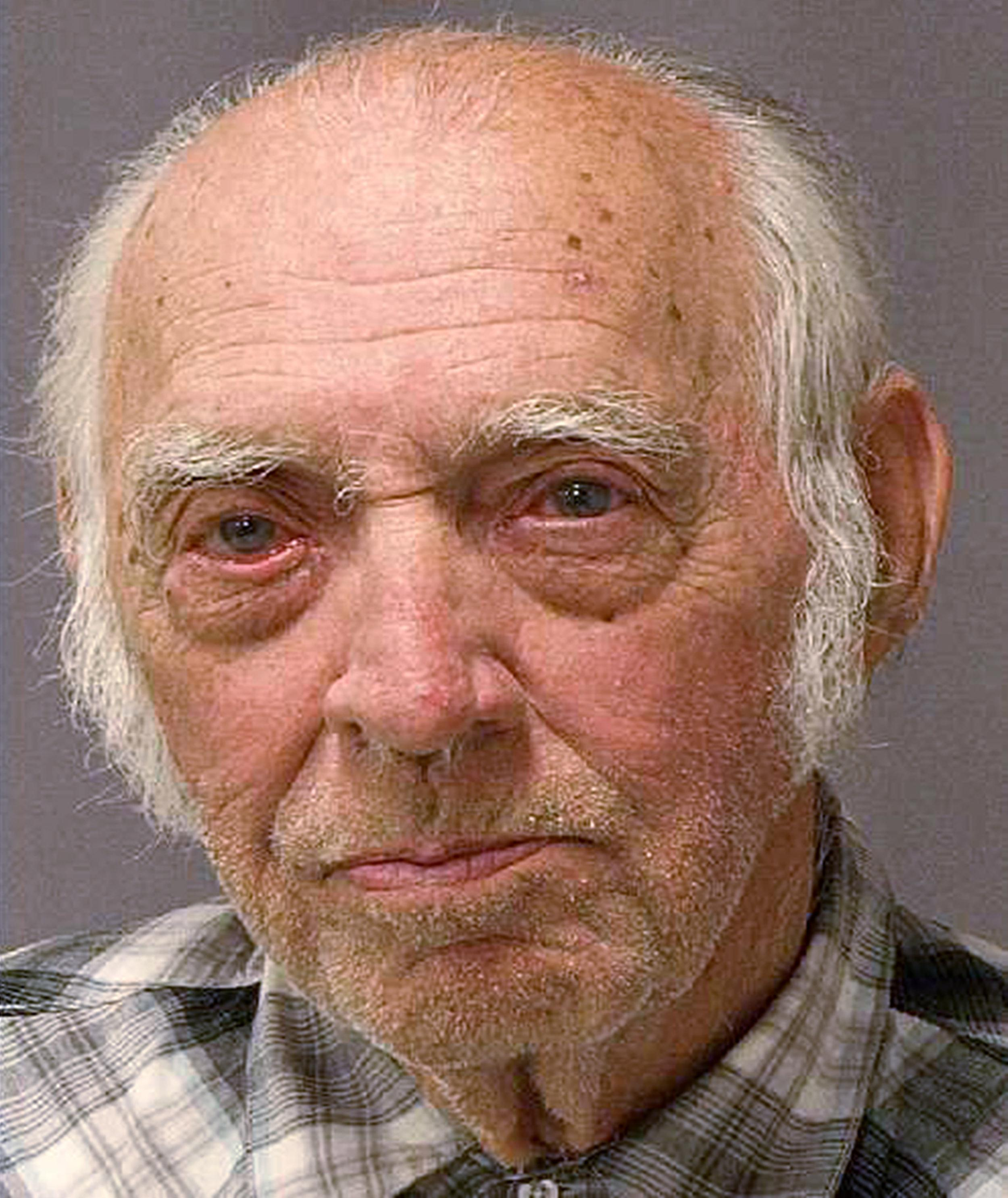
The Mule is based on "The Sinaloa Cartel's 90-Year-Old Drug Mule", a New York Times article about Leo Sharp, pictured here upon his arrest in 2011 at the age of 87.

During 2014, DEA Special Agent Jeff Moore, who arrested 87-year-old Leo Sharp in 2011, was interviewed by The New York Times regarding the investigation of Sharp, the world's oldest and most prolific drug mule. The rights to the subsequent article, "The Sinaloa Cartel's 90-Year-Old Drug Mule" by Sam Dolnick, were sold to Imperative Entertainment later that year.

Imperative hired Ruben Fleischer to direct and produce the film. In February 2015, Nick Schenk was hired to adapt the article into a film screenplay.

In January 2018, it was revealed that the film would be titled The Mule and that Clint Eastwood would direct the film instead, as well as produce and star in it, for Warner Bros. Entertainment and Imperative. Producers include Eastwood for Malpaso Productions, along with Tim Moore, Kristina Rivera and Jessica Meier, and Dan Friedkin and Bradley Thomas for Imperative Entertainment. Fleischer executive produced.

=== Casting ===
In January 2018, Eastwood was set to play the role of Earl Stone, a Korean War veteran in his 80s, based on World War II veteran Leo Sharp, who worked as a drug courier for a Mexican cartel. In May 2018, Bradley Cooper joined the cast to play DEA agent Colin Bates, based on agent Jeff Moore, who is chasing Stone, and along with Cooper, Lobo Sebastian also joined the film. In June 2018, Dianne Wiest and Michael Peña joined the film's cast to play Earl Stone's ex-wife and Bates' fellow DEA agent, respectively. More cast members were also confirmed, including Laurence Fishburne as a DEA special agent in charge, Alison Eastwood as Stone's daughter, Taissa Farmiga as Stone's granddaughter, and Ignacio Serricchio as Stone's cartel handler. That same month, Loren Dean joined the cast of the film. In July 2018, Victor Rasuk was cast, and Manny Montana was also confirmed.

=== Filming ===
Principal photography on the film began on June 4, 2018, in Atlanta, Canton, Rome, and Augusta, Georgia. It was also shot in Las Cruces, New Mexico and various locations in Colorado, including Cave of the Winds in Manitou Springs and in Fort Morgan along Interstate 76.

== Release ==
The film was released on December 14, 2018, in the United States and released on January 25, 2019, in the United Kingdom. It premiered on December 10, 2018, in Westwood, California.

=== Home media ===
The Mule was released on digital HD on March 19, 2019, and on 4K UHD Blu-ray, Blu-ray and DVD on April 2, 2019. It is also available for online streaming video and digital downloading through Apple's iTunes Store and Vudu.

== Reception ==
=== Box office ===
The Mule grossed $103.8 million in the United States and Canada, and $69.8 million in other territories, for a total worldwide gross of $173.6 million, against a production budget of $50 million.

In the United States and Canada, The Mule was released alongside Spider-Man: Into the Spider-Verse and Mortal Engines, and was projected to gross $15–18 million from 2,588 theaters in its opening weekend. It made $5.9 million on its first day and $17.5 million over the weekend, finishing second at the box office and marking the third-best opening of Eastwood's acting career, after Gran Torino and Space Cowboys. It made $9.5 million in its second weekend, finishing fifth, and then $4.9 million on Christmas Day.

=== Critical response ===
On Rotten Tomatoes, the film holds an approval rating of 70% based on 190 reviews, with an average rating of 6.2/10. The website's critical consensus reads, "A flawed yet enjoyable late-period Eastwood entry, The Mule stubbornly retains its footing despite a few missteps on its occasionally unpredictable path." On Metacritic, the film has a weighted average score of 58 out of 100, based on 37 critics, indicating "mixed or average reviews". Audiences polled by CinemaScore gave the film an average grade of "A−" on an A+ to F scale, while those at PostTrak gave it four out of five stars.

Peter Debruge of Variety wrote, "It's a great true story, colorfully told by Sam Dolnick in The New York Times". David Ehrlich of IndieWire gave the film a "B+" and called it Eastwood's best in over 25 years, writing: "This soulful and deeply satisfying film—a fitting swan song, if ever there was one—makes a compelling argument that change is always possible, and that the path we're on is never as narrow as the highway makes it look." In 2019, The Mule was included in Richard Brody's list of the 27 best films of the decade.
