= Bitcoin (disambiguation) =

Bitcoin is a cryptocurrency.

Bitcoin may also refer to:

- Bitcoin Core, the actual software that enables sending Bitcoin (the currency) and implements the P2P protocol (also called Bitcoin) and its consensus rules (also called Bitcoin)
- Bitcoin (film), an upcoming film
