= History of the Hmong Americans in Metro Detroit =

As of 2007 most Hmong people in the State of Michigan lived in northeastern Detroit, but they have been increasingly moving to Pontiac and Warren.

== History ==
Many Hmong immigrated to Michigan after the end of the Vietnam War in the 1970s. The Hmong had moved to Detroit in order to obtain employment and so members of the same families could live in the same area. Hmong people had migrated to Detroit from various places in the United States.

By 2000 there were about 1,700 Hmong people in the Osborn neighborhood of Detroit. As of 2001 there were about 5,000 Hmong in total in Metro Detroit, with most of them living in the east side of Detroit and Warren. As of that year, Metro Detroit's Hmong population is smaller than the major Hmong populations in California, Minnesota, and Wisconsin.

As of 2002 the concentrations of Hmong and Laotian people in the tri-county area were in northeast Detroit, southern Warren, and central Pontiac. In 2002 Booza and Metzger wrote that "The 3,943 Hmong living in tri-county area are one of the most concentrated of the Asian groups." A 2010 report from Data Driven Detroit, City Connect Detroit, stated that within the Osborn neighborhood of Detroit, the Hmong, which now numbered at 560, "had established a tight-knit community". By 2013 the Hmong population in the Osborn neighborhood had declined due to Hmong people moving to Warren and Sterling Heights.

== Demographics ==
Emily Lawsin, a lecturer in Asian/Pacific Islander American Studies at the University of Michigan, stated in 2006 that most Asians in the City of Detroit are Hmong.

As of 2001 40% of Detroit Hmong households had members of three generations living in each residence. As of 2001 the average Hmong household in Metro Detroit had 5.7 residents. The weighted average from the 1990 U.S. census stated that the average household size in Detroit and Warren was 2.6 residents.

As of 2001 the average adult Hmong person came from a family that had an average of 8.2 children, so the average adult Hmong had 7.2 siblings. The average adult Hmong planned to have five children and had three children, making it a decline of 3.2 children in one generation, while it remained higher than the U.S. average of 1.9 children per family.

City	Hmong Population	Hmong Percentage
Warren	2,631	1.925%
Pontiac	1,191	1.933%
Detroit	326	0.050%
Sterling Heights	201	0.150%
Auburn Hills	147	0.603%

== Economics ==
As of 2001 90% of households had an income between $30,000 and $70,000. The changes in welfare laws and acculturation caused more Hmong to work.

As of 2001 most Hmong worked in blue collar jobs, including factory work and machine parts jobs. Many Hmong worked in automobile plants. In addition as of that year many worked for Detroit Public Schools as bilingual teachers and assistants. The number of Hmong bilingual teachers and assistants was increasing as of 2001. Other than the teachers and assistants there were few professional Hmong.

At that time most Hmong did not own businesses. As of 2001 almost 100 restaurants, serving Chinese and Thai food, were owned by Hmong, making Michigan the state with the highest number of Hmong-owned restaurants. In addition, as of 2001 three Hmong grocery stores were located in Detroit, and some Hmong operated Hmong grocery stores.

Smith stated that due to the small size of the Detroit Hmong community, the teaching sector and the restaurant sector "occupies [sic] a non-trivial share of the adult population and allows a substantial number of Hmong to work with co-ethnics."

== Institutions ==
The Hmong Community Inc. in Detroit previously served as a decision-making committee for the Hmong community and had a more active role. Natalie Jill Smith, author of the PhD thesis "Ethnicity, Reciprocity, Reputation and Punishment: An Ethnoexperimental Study of Cooperation among the Chaldeans and Hmong of Detroit (Michigan)" wrote that the activity in the group had declined by 2001: now it had once monthly meetings to plan the annual Hmong New Year festival, and the organization itself "consists of a room with an answering machine."

Smith wrote that there were few organized Hmong groups in Michigan. Those that existed included the Hmong Women United of Michigan, which in 2001 had been newly established, and some Hmong churches.

The Hmong Women United of Michigan was founded by a group of Hmong women. Some Hmong men felt threatened by an increasing power in Hmong women and they prohibited their wives from joining that group.

The Detroit Asian Youth Project (DAY Project) seeks to develop political self-awareness, awareness about Asian cultures, and leadership skills. The group, founded by students, primarily works with Hmong students.

== Language ==
In a 2001 study of Detroit and Warren Hmong, 50% spoke both English and Hmong in the house, 29% spoke only Hmong in the house, and 21% spoke only English in the house. Parents spoke to themselves in Hmong. Most children spoke to their parents in Hmong but some younger schoolchildren spoke to their parents in English. Hmong siblings tended to speak to each other in English. Smith wrote that she believed that English will become the primary language in Hmong households as Hmong children who speak English among one another grow up and have their own families.

== Education ==
As of 2001 Detroit Hmong had below average educational attainment. The area had a total of one Hmong doctor and relatively few people who had already graduated from university. At the time some Hmong were attending university.

In 2006 two Hmong high school students who spoke at a forum hosted by the United Asian American Organizations at the University of Michigan stated that the upholding of traditional family obligations and the lack of English knowledge from their parents complicated their high school careers.

A former teacher at Osborn High School in Osborn, Detroit stated that the student body was about one third Hmong after the first wave of Hmong people moved into northeast Detroit.

== Religion ==
Smith stated that she had been told that the percentage of Christians in the Detroit Hmong community had ranged from 25% to 50% but that it "is not known with certainty".

One Hmong church in Metro Detroit had about 100-200 congregants on every Sunday. Only one member, a White woman married to a Hmong person, was a non-Hmong.

== Popular culture ==
The film Gran Torino depicts a Hmong family living in Metro Detroit.

== See also ==
- Demographics of Metro Detroit
