= Ahney Her =

American actress (born 1992)

Whitney Ahney Her
- Born: Whitney Her; July 13, 1992 (age 33); Lansing, Michigan, U.S.
- Other name: Ahney Her
- Years active: 2008–present

Whitney Cua Her (born 1992), better known by her stage name Ahney Her, is an American actress. She is of Hmong descent.

== Early life and education ==
Born and raised in Lansing, Michigan, and completed high school at Sexton High School before being cast for Gran Torino. She studied drama in a local talent school for three years.

== Career ==
Her first film role was in the 2008 film Gran Torino, directed by Clint Eastwood. In Gran Torino, Eastwood plays a Korean War veteran who helps a Hmong American family in his Detroit neighborhood. She plays Sue Lor, the intelligent, witty older sister of Thao Vang Lor, who was portrayed by Bee Vang. She was 16 years old at the time of the film's opening in wide release on January 9, 2009.

She was cast in the film after responding to an open casting call sign-up at a soccer tournament. The open call was specifically looking for potential Hmong actors. In a 2009 interview with The Grand Rapids Press, she recalled, "I didn't believe it, 'cause the tent said, you know, 'Clint Eastwood movie' or something like that, 'Hmong people needed.' And I'm like, 'OK, yeah right. Like this would happen.' Out of all people, Hmong people? No."

Ahney Her was in Grand Rapids, Michigan, to watch the first screening of Gran Torino. The film made its Grand Rapids debut at the Theater One at Celebration! Cinemas North on January 9, 2009.

In 2011, she was cast in the action comedy movie Night Club as Nikki, alongside Zachary Abel, Natasha Lyonne, Ernest Borgnine, and Mickey Rooney.

== Filmography ==
=== Film ===
| Year | Title | Role | Notes |
|---|---|---|---|
| 2008 | Gran Torino | Sue Lor | |
| 2011 | Night Club | Nikki | |
| 2016 | Batman v Superman: Dawn of Justice | Hostage Girl #1 | |
