= Walt Kowalski =

Fictional character from the 2008 film Gran Torino

- Walt Kowalski as portrayed by Clint Eastwood
- First appearance: Gran Torino (2008)
- Last appearance: Gran Torino (2008)
- Portrayed by: Clint Eastwood

In-universe information
- Full name: Walter Kowalski
- Gender: Male
- Occupation: Ford auto assembly-line worker (retired)
- Affiliation: United States Army (1951–53)
- Family: Mitch Kowalski (son); Brian Kowalski (son); Karen Kowalski (daughter-in-law); Ashley Kowalski (granddaughter); Josh Kowalski (grandson)
- Significant others: Dorothy Kowalski (wife; deceased)
- Nationality: American

Walter Kowalski is a fictional character portrayed by Clint Eastwood in the 2008 American film Gran Torino. Walt is depicted as an irritable and prejudiced Korean War veteran whose aging Metro Detroit neighborhood has become home to Hmong immigrants and is plagued with gang violence.

The character of Walt and Eastwood's performance have garnered positive reception.

== Character overview ==
Walt is introduced as an elderly, cantankerous, Polish-American whose wife of 50 years dies, leaving him alone in his Rust Belt neighborhood of Highland Park, Michigan. Adhering to conservative values and openly prejudiced, he dislikes that his neighborhood has become home to poor immigrants. Adding to his isolation, Walt is retired and does not have a close relationship with his family. His only companions are fellow members of the VFW and his elderly Labrador Retriever, Daisy. A handyman, Walt spends his days maintaining his property. He is a heavy drinker and tobacco user; often seen drinking Pabst Blue Ribbon, chewing Red Man tobacco, and smoking cigarettes.

Walt is a decorated Korean War combat veteran, having served in the United States Army's 1st Cavalry Division. He was awarded the Silver Star for valor, having been the only survivor of his unit's assault on an enemy machine gun nest. By his own admission, he killed thirteen or more enemy soldiers during the conflict, but is particularly haunted by his unordered killing of a teenage North Korean soldier who had been trying to surrender to him. After the war, Walt returned to Michigan, worked at a Ford automobile factory, got married and had two sons. In 1972, he put the steering column in a Ford Torino he helped assemble, and at some point obtained the car for himself.

== Character arc ==
In 2008, Dorothy Kowalski dies after a prolonged illness, leaving Walt a widower. Walt rebuffs his two sons when they express concerns for his well-being, and instead chooses to remain alone in his aging home and neighborhood. His neighbors, the Vang Lor family, are poor Hmong immigrants with whom he does not get along. Walt also rejects multiple attempts by Dorothy's priest to comfort him.

One night, Walt catches 15-year-old Thao Vang Lor attempting to steal his Ford Torino as part of a Hmong gang initiation. He nearly shoots Thao, who narrowly escapes. The following day, the gang attempts to abduct Thao; Walt intervenes and threatens the gang at gunpoint. Much to Walt's dismay, the local Hmong bring him gifts out of respect. Additionally, Thao's mother requires Thao to do work for Walt as penance.

Walt has Thao perform various jobs around his home and the neighborhood, and the two begin to form a mutual respect. Walt also rescues Thao's sister Sue from the unwanted advances of African American gangsters. He begins to bond with the Vang Lor family, recognizing their traditional values are more in line with his own beliefs than he originally thought. Walt, plagued by coughing fits and occasionally spitting up blood, visits the doctor and seemingly receives a poor prognosis.

Walt becomes a mentor to Thao, helping him to gain a construction job. When the gang assaults Thao, Walt responds by attacking and threatening one of the members. The gang retaliates by committing a drive-by shooting on the Vang Lor household and raping Sue. Thao begs Walt to help him retaliate.

Recognizing that Thao and his family will never be safe from the gang, Walt develops a plan. Thao, wanting revenge, looks to Walt for guidance. After making some preparations including a Catholic confession, Walt locks Thao in his basement, expressing that he wants to save him from being haunted by violence.

Walt presents himself at the gang's residence and begins insulting them. As the gang draws their firearms, Walt places a cigarette in his mouth and quickly reaches into his jacket; the gang opens fire and shoots Walt dead. Walt was unarmed and reached for his Zippo lighter. When Sue and Thao arrive, police reveal that witnesses have come forward and that the gang will be going to prison.

After Walt's funeral, his will and testament is read; he leaves his Ford Torino to Thao and everything else to the church much to the dismay of his family who were looking forward to taking possession of Walt's house and belongings for themselves.

== Views and morality ==
Walt initially is depicted as openly prejudiced, specifically toward East Asian people, often using ethnic slurs such as "gook" to describe them. He also dislikes Japanese automakers and is vocal about his dislike of rice burners (in contrast to traditional American muscle cars). Over the course of the film, Walt comes to appreciate the Hmong culture and people.

He also utilizes slurs when bantering with others, including his Italian-American barber Martin whom he calls a "wop" and "dago", as well as his Irish-American friend whom he calls a "mick". He also calls a gang of African-American youths he confronts in the film "spooks".

Todd McCarthy of Variety said that Walt's "racist mutterings, which employ every imaginable epithet for Asians, are blunt and nasty, but Eastwood grunts them out in an over-the-top way that provokes laughs, and his targets are no less sparing of him." Walt originally perceives his Hmong neighbors as being generic Asians rather than as the Hmong that they are. Mark Jenkins of National Public Radio says "He hates everything new or foreign, so much so that he growls at the modern world like a junkyard dog." Tom Charity says that the character's "racist Bunker mentality thaws" when Sue introduces him to Hmong food.

John Serba of The Grand Rapids Press says that the intolerance demonstrated by Walt "goes deeper than skin color" since he is also against stupidity, "trait that transcends superficialities". Serba adds that "his definition of unintelligent is broader than the average person's, thus, his conversations tend to become confrontations quickly, and perhaps surprisingly, to our amusement."

Wanda Teays, author of Seeing the Light: Exploring Ethics Through Movies, said that Walt originally is a "moral absolutist" who believes that values are universal and do not differ at all even if the context is different. She said that after Walt beats a gangster in retaliation for an attack on Thao Vang Lor, the gangsters retaliate by attacking Sue Lor. Teays said that this causes him to rethink his tactics.

== Similarities and differences with other Eastwood characters ==
Tania Modleski, author of "Clint Eastwood and Male Weepies", said that "[f]or many reviewers, Gran Torino represents the final step in Eastwood's repudiation of the Dirty Harry [sic] persona. If Unforgiven ends up being equivocal in its attitude toward violence and vigilantism, Gran Torino appears to accept the impotence of the lone avenging hero" and that the impotence "is perhaps underlined by Walt's repeated gesture of pointing his finger at villains as if it were a gun." Amy Biancolli of the Houston Chronicle said that even though Walt, an "old fart", does not have the same name as Inspector Harry Callahan, the protagonist of Dirty Harry, played by Eastwood, "there's no mistaking the rasp in his voice or the uncompromising crankiness of his Weltanschauung." Tom Charity of CNN said that Walt, "Like other Eastwood heroes before him, Walt sacrifices his independence by accepting that others depend on him." Serba said that Walt, who is "bitter, hopelessly cranky", "shares a sense of moral certainty" with Callahan, but that Walt "is infused with the wisdom and weariness" that Callahan does not have. Jenkins said that Walt is similar to Frankie Dunn, a character played by Eastwood in Million Dollar Baby.

Nick Schenk, the writer of the script of the film, said "Walt is like a lot of shop teachers and coaches that you have in school. He's the kind of guy who's just waiting for you to screw up so he can roll his eyes at you." Eastwood has said that the car is "sort of a symbol of his days with the Ford plant" and that the gun "is sort of a symbol of his days in the military. … He's clinging to the memory of the war. You'll find out when you see it, some of (the memories) are not as pleasant as others. That helps make him even tougher to get along with."

Anthony Breznican of USA Today said that even though Clint Eastwood had served in the Korean War (in a non-combat role) he "has little in common with Kowalski." Jenkins explained that Walt is "a man of action who's offended by the Catholic church's dogmatic insistence that it understands mortality better than a grizzled vet who's seen comrades die." Jenkins added that Walt also "learned firsthand that self-sacrifice is not transcendent" in a similar manner to John Bradley, the protagonist of Flags of Our Fathers, and Tadamichi Kuribayashi, the protagonist of Letters from Iwo Jima. Jenkins explained that Walt ultimately "assumes a Christ-like posture, both to save his new friends and to put Janovich in his place." John Serba of The Grand Rapids Press argues that Eastwood in Gran Torino "finds his focus on" Walt and "When Walt wields his weapons with righteous fury, Eastwood the actor shows us a damaged man suffering a horrible wartime flashback, without stating it outright." Serba argues that the "suggestiveness makes it easier to overlook the inexperience of his supporting cast and the occasionally overstated, transparent dialogue." Biancolli said that Eastwood, as Walt, "just keeps doing his Dirty Harry glare, whipping out guns real and imaginary. But it's hard not to see him as Mr. Wilson [George Everett Wilson] — Dennis the Menace's crotchety neighbor. Skinnier, hairier, no mustache."

Schenk said that he got the inspiration for Walt Kowalski from several war veterans he met while working as a clerk in a liquor store. Schenk explained that "I just knew this character well. When I was working construction, I'd meet a lot of guys like Walt Kowalski. Because I liked history, I'd always be the one that the older guys on the site would tell their stories to." He originally intended for Walt's car to be a Ford because a Ford assembly line was near Schenk's location in the Minneapolis area. He was not aware that Harry Callahan, the main character in Dirty Harry, drove a Gran Torino. Schenk said that the vehicle could have been a Crown Victoria but he preferred the sound of the name "Gran Torino". Schenk said that individuals told him that he would not be successful in selling a script that had an elderly man as the main character, and especially one who sounds like he has racist views.

== Reception ==
Serna said that "Walt's Archie Bunker-ish sandpaper brusqueness" gives the film "a refreshing, if not outright surprising, levity." Jenkins argued that Walt "is just not convincing, even as a semi-comic character" because the racism espoused by Walt "is as one-dimensional as his reluctant heroism". Peter Howell of the Toronto Star said that Eastwood "transforms a stereotypical racist into a fully realized character."

== See also ==
- List of Gran Torino characters
