= Noblett =

Noblett, Noblette, or Noblitt may refer to:

- William Noblett (born 1953), an Anglican priest and author
- Noblett Creek, a stream in the U.S. state of Missouri
- 77856 Noblitt, a minor planet
- Irene Noblett (1902–1973, also Noblitt or Noblette) or Irene Ryan, an American actress
