= Grimmet, Missouri =

- Unincorporated community
- Location within Missouri Location within the United States Location within the United States
- Coordinates: 36°46′53″N 92°00′24″W
- Country: United States
- State: Missouri
- County: Howell
- Named after: Samuel Grimmet, early settler
- Elevation: 1,086 ft (331 m)
- Time zone: UTC-6 (Central Standard Time)
  - Summer (DST): UTC-5 (Central Daylight Time)
- ZIP Code: 65775
- Area code: 417
- GNIS feature ID: 750166

Grimmet is an unincorporated community in western Howell County, Missouri, United States. The community is located approximately one mile north of Tabor Creek, south of Missouri Route 14 and about 3.5 miles east of Siloam Springs.

== History ==
A post office called Grimmet was established in 1893, and remained in operation until 1937. The community was named after Samuel Grimmett, a settler who was credited with securing the town a post office.
