= Night Club (2011 film) =

- Film poster
- Directed by: Sam Borowski
- Screenplay by: Larry Delrose; Tom Hass
- Story by: Larry Delrose
- Produced by: Sam Borowski; Brian LaBelle; Samuel M. Sherman; J. Todd Smith
- Starring: Ernest Borgnine; Mickey Rooney
- Cinematography: William Schweikert
- Edited by: Joann Murano
- Distributed by: The Naoj Company
- Release date: April 7, 2011
- Country: United States
- Language: English

Night Club is a 2011 American comedy film starring Ernest Borgnine and Mickey Rooney. It is the directorial debut of Sam Borowski.

== Plot ==
Justin (Zachary Abel), Nikki (Ahney Her) and Chris (Bryan Williams) take jobs at a retirement home to pay their way through college. With the help of Alfred (Ernest Borgnine), one of the residents, they set up a nightclub on the premises.

== Cast ==
- Ernest Borgnine as Albert
- Zachary Abel as Justin Palma
- Natasha Lyonne as Mrs. Keaton
- Ahney Her as Nikki
- Mickey Rooney as Jerry Sherman
- Sally Kellerman as Dorothy
- Daniel Roebuck as Frank
- Rance Howard as Chuck
- Paul Sorvino as himself
- Alex Hyde-White as Preacher
- Chuck McCann as Manny Melowitz
- Mary Dimino as Gina Palma
- Jan Rooney as Janet
- Clint Howard as Cliff

== Awards ==
The film won Best Feature, Best Director, Best Actor (Borgnine), Best Actress (Lyonne), and Best Supporting Actor/Actress (Kellerman) at the Golden Door Film Festival in Jersey City, New Jersey.
