= List of Gran Torino characters =

Several characters of Gran Torino. From left to right, Walt Kowalski (Clint Eastwood), Thao Vang Lor (Bee Vang), Vu Lor (Brooke Chia Thao), Gran (Chee Thao), and Sue Lor (Ahney Her).

The following is a list of significant characters who feature in the 2008 film Gran Torino, directed by Clint Eastwood.

Casting calls were held in Fresno, California, Detroit, Michigan, and Saint Paul, Minnesota, from which Eastwood selected ten Hmong American lead actors and supporting actors. Of them, only one was not a first time actor. Of the Hmong cast, five, including Bee Vang, one of the principal actors, were from the state of Minnesota. Ahney Her comes from Lansing, Michigan. The casting agency Pound & Mooney recruited thirty actors and over 500 extras. The firm recruited many Hmong actors from a Hmong soccer tournament in Macomb County, Michigan. Sandy Ci Moua, a Hmong actress based in the Minneapolis-St. Paul area, assisted with the film's casting of Hmong actors.

One actor who auditioned praised how the casting avoided the typical East Asian stereotypes in favor of authenticity, saying "They could have walked down Hollywood and looked for some Korean, Chinese, whatever, Asian-American actors, and say, 'Hey, can we teach you a few Hmong (words),' like they do in other movies, just mimic the words. But no, they said, 'We want real Hmong-speaking actors.' Asian Americans, we can tell, 'That guy's not Chinese! That guy's not Korean!' So, stop trying to fool us."

== Walt Kowalski ==
Walter "Walt" Kowalski (portrayed by Clint Eastwood) is a Polish-American former auto worker who becomes embroiled in a conflict involving a Hmong family and a gang. Walt Kowalski had served in the Korean War and had killed a North Korean boy who had been trying to surrender to him. Walt Kowalski has bitter memories of the conflict. He is a retiree who formerly worked at a Ford automobile plant for much of his life, and he owns a Gran Torino he had personally built. He also owns an M1 Garand rifle as well as a Colt 45 ACP pistol. Walt's wife, Dorothy Kowalski, is dead by the beginning of the film.

== Thao Vang Lor ==
Thao Vang Lor (portrayed by Bee Vang) is a Hmong American teenager who is coerced by a Hmong gang to attempt to steal Walt Kowalski's Gran Torino. Walt often calls Thao "Toad." With no father in the family, he is expected to be the man of the house, but he lacks direction and initially does chores at the direction of his sister Sue. Thao is soon coerced into joining the Hmong gang by his gangster cousins. After Thao clumsily attempts to steal Walt's car as part of his forced gang initiation, he returns home instead of fleeing with the gang. After confessing the attempted crime to his family, Thao's mother and sister bring him to Walt to apologize and make amends to the community as Walt's servant. Walt also sees Thao helping an elderly neighbor with her groceries after she is ignored by several Asian kids that pass by. Through Walt, he learns how to do construction work and labor, and how to act like a man, even getting help in his romantic pursuit of Youa. Initially perceived as a coward by Walt, their growing relationship gradually changes the older man's impression of Thao, with Walt ultimately entrusting the Ford Gran Torino to Thao.

Tania Modleski, author of "Clint Eastwood and Male Weepies," says that Thao is "pacific by nature." Jeff Baenen of the Associated Press said that Thao was "weak-willed." Louisa Schein and Va-Megn Thoj, authors of "Beyond Gran Torino’s Guns: Hmong Cultural Warriors Performing Genders", said that when Walt masculinizes Thao, he "liberat[es] him from the effeminacy apparently imposed on him by his domineering mother and sister (and implicitly his race)."

Schein in Hmong Today said in regards to Vang that "With a mild-mannered countenance and a slight build, he’s equipped to fill the role of neighborhood wimp." Schein added that Vang "is as humble as" Thao, but "not quite as bookish." The creators selected Vang for the role because, in the words of Baenen, "his innocent looks and slight build." Vang said that the height difference between him and Eastwood (Vang as Thao was 5 feet 5 inches (1.65 m) and Eastwood as Walt was 6 feet 2 inches (1.88 m)) was intentional and illustrates how "Tao is literally ‘looking up’ to Walt." Vang said that while he had the same culture Thao had, he did not experience violent incidents like Thao did. Vang added that he and Thao "were quite alike. We are both loners but I think I am more outgoing."

In the original script, Thao was described as a "A slight, slender Hmong boy with long hair and eyelashes" and an "Asian Johnny Depp." Regarding that point Vang said "OK, but I didn't understand the function of those looks in the story. Also I was annoyed at the comparing of Asian men to a white standard of beauty. I mean [chuckles] who is to say we're not even better than Johnny's looks?"

Vang said that he auditioned "on a lark." One week before the beginning of the shooting of the film, Vang learned that he won the role.

=== Vang acting as Thao ===
Vang said that "During the shooting of the film, I tried to stay true to the script. But as a Hmong person, I also tried to do justice to my own life and to that of others like me." In an interview Vang said that he intended to "redeem" Thao, who Sang Chi and Emily Moberg Robinson, editors of Voices of the Asian American and Pacific Islander Experience: Volume 1, referred to as "emasculated."

Vang said that he intended to "create a character that people could love" and that he "decided to commit to developing the role of Thao, making him more complex and credible." Vang said that he "imagined a guy who would chafe at his subordination more. So even when he had to obey, he did it with more attitude." Vang said that while the script "was premised on his not having any dignity" and that Thao "needs to be clueless and have no self-respect in order for the white elder man to achieve his savior role" and "has to hang his head and absorb abuse," Vang said that he added "intonation and gestures to try to give Thao some dignity." Vang said "So it makes me wonder how a character like Thao could bring any change to Walt."

=== Reception to Thao ===
Todd McCarthy of Variety said "A bit characterless at first, Vang ultimately comes into his own as a 16-year-old forced into life's crossroads." Carol Cling of the Pulaski News said that Vang, as Thao, gave an "achingly earnest" performance.

== Sue Lor ==
Sue Lor (portrayed by Ahney Her) is a Hmong American girl who is Thao's older sister. She is the first of Walt Kowalski's Hmong neighbors to befriend him after he rescues her from being hurt by an Afro-American gang. She has a streetwise, witty personality and a strong, independent spirit; she easily gets along with Walt despite his grumpiness. She teaches Walt about the Hmong people's history and struggles in American culture, and the two of them realize that they share something in common of being "betrayed"; Walt by his own family and the Hmong people by the United States despite fighting alongside them in the Vietnam War.

Louisa Schein and Va-Megn Thoj, authors of "Gran Torino’s Boys and Men with Guns: Hmong Perspectives", said: "In defiance of women‘s typified hyperfemininity, Sue is outspoken, virtually fearless, gregarious, and fiercely protective of her brother." They added: "Where Walt uses his gun, Sue brandishes her words in retorts" and "[i]n a rare moment for American ethnic representation, she (and Walt) even make [sic] her white boyfriend look effeminate by standing up to menacing men of color on the street and calling them on their Asian slurs." Ty Burr of the Boston Globe said that Sue is "Upwardly mobile and brutally illusion-free." Schein, also of the Hmong Today, said that Her "is the same kind of self-possessed young woman in life as she plays on camera." Manohla Dargis of The New York Times said that Sue is "mouthy" and "friendly". Amy Biancolli of the Houston Chronicle says that Sue is "feisty." Tom Charity of CNN said that Sue is "self-assured." Schein and Thoj said "[i]t could be argued, then, that Sue exemplifies a strong Hmong American womanhood, forged through the hardships of immigration in families where fathers are weakened by culture shock or deceased during the war." They explained that one hallmark of "such women" is "[l]anguage strength" and that "Sue exhibits it in spades, with wit, vocabulary, knowledge, even persuasion skills." Schein and Thoj concluded that because of Sue, the film "could be heralded as a celebration of the achievements of Hmong American women who survive by learning how to improve on the most daunting situations."

Schein and Thoj said that there could be "more pessimistic readings of Sue that should also be considered." Txhiameng Vu, quoted in Schein and Thoj's publication, said that Sue "is portrayed as intelligent and strong, she has no personal motivation to guide her character" and that since she is "[d]esigned as a character that exists primarily to serve the film‘s storyline, Sue is unable to develop as a real character with her own motivation and resolution. She is positioned similarly to ethnic damsels in distress in classic Westerns, comparable to the role of the Native American princess who needs rescuing by the sheriff." Vu explained that "Sue exists primarily as a continuous plot device to connect Walt to Thao and the Hmong community and to drive the story along" Schein and Thoj said that the various strengths Sue has "seem to exist in the service" of Thao and that "By default another lumpen-refugee, her seeking work to help out the family never comes in for consideration despite all the worries about Thao‘s lack of employment." They argued that the film gives no indication that Sue is in school or has any career plans for herself, despite her "tremendous verbosity."

=== Reception to Sue ===
Todd McCarthy of Variety said "Her capably embodies a girl with more spirit than judgment."

== Minor characters ==
=== Lor family ===
- Vu Lor (portrayed by Brooke Chia Thao) - Vu Lor is the mother of Thao and Sue. On the set of Gran Torino, staff members praised Brooke Chia Thao for her acting in a scene where she tried to prevent members of a Hmong gang from taking away her son. Brooke Chia Thao said "The gang fighters said it felt real. After that, everyone knew me."
- Grandma Lor (portrayed by Chee Thao) - The grandmother of Thao and Sue and matriarch of Lor family. Amy Biancolli of the Houston Chronicle says that Grandma is "truculent." Chee Thao is the mother of six sons and three daughters, and at the time of production she was not fluent in English. Kao Vang, one of Chee Thao's daughters, interpreted for her on the set. Chee Thao said that she was able to perform credibly in her role because she herself had negative circumstances in her real life. Chee Thao was a widow. Three of her sons died in Laos. One of her remaining sons had been murdered in the United States. The husband of her daughter, who is the father of her daughter's children, was not present in the household.

=== The Hmong gang ===
The five actors who were cast as the Hmong street gang members came from five different Hmong clans and five different U.S. states.

- "Smokie" (portrayed by Sonny Vue) - Smokie is the ringleader of the gang. Louisa Schein of Hmong Today said that Vue, born in Fresno, California and residing in St. Paul, Minnesota, "was a surprise pick for the gang." Before starring in the film, Vue's only acting experience involving taking a high school acting class. Vue said that he may have been chosen due to speaking "Hmong street English" and his "Hmong American look"; during his audition he wore a T-shirt that said "I’m Hiding From the Cops."
- Fong "Spider" (portrayed by Thailand-born, Minnesota-raised actor Doua Moua) - Fong is Thao's sociopathic cousin, shot caller of the gang, and the main antagonist. Moua, a graduate of the International School of Minnesota in Eden Prairie, Minnesota, said that he had so many regrets in playing as a gang member, since, in the words of Laura Yuen of Minnesota Public Radio, "gangs consumed his brother's life while they were growing up in St. Paul." Moua added that many first generation Hmong are affected by gangs and drift into gangs due to a lack of father figures.
- Gangster #1 - Elvis Thao, a man who was born in Kansas and had also lived in Modesto, California and then Milwaukee, Wisconsin, plays Gangster #1. Elvis Thao said that originally he felt concern about playing a gang member and inadvertently promoting stereotypes about them. He said "“As long as I distance myself from the character I’m playing, I’m hoping they’ll see what Hmong have to offer [as actors]." As of 2011 Elvis is now an activist.
- Gangster #2 - Jerry Lee, a Chico, California resident who was 22 years old at the time of production, plays him.
- Gangster #3 - Lee Mong Vang, Vichaan Kue from Metro Detroit, plays him. Lee Mong Vang added some comedic lines to the dialog of Gangster #3.

=== Kowalski family ===
Walt Kowalski disapproves of his sons' wealthy lifestyles and what he considers their exploitative professions (Mitch is in sales for Toyota), who in return are frustrated with their father being stubborn and stuck in the past.

John Serba of The Grand Rapids Press said that Walt's sons are "shallow and condescending". Amy Biancolli of the Houston Chronicle said that Walt's sons can be described as "boob." John P. Meyer of KATU said that the wives and children of Walt's sons were "less-than-sympathetic." Manohla Dargis of New York Times has described the sons as having "big houses, big cars, big waistlines".

- Mitch Kowalski (portrayed by Brian Haley) - Is Walt's older son, Karen's husband, the father of Ashley and Josh, and is Steve's brother.
- Steve Kowalski (portrayed by Brian Howe) - Is Walt's younger son, Mitch's brother, Josh and Ashley's uncle, and Karen's brother-in-law.
- Karen Kowalski (portrayed by Geraldine Hughes) - Is Mitch's wife, Walt's daughter in law, the mother of Ashley and Josh, and is Steve's sister-in-law.
- Ashley Kowalski (portrayed by Dreama Walker) - Is Walt's granddaughter, Mitch and Karen's daughter, Steve's niece, and Josh's sister. She wore a bare-midriff shirt to her grandmother's funeral. She also smokes and covets Walt's vintage Ford Grand Torino. Biancolli says that Ashley is "spoiled."
- Josh Kowalski (portrayed by Michael E. Kurowski) - Is Walt's grandson, Mitch and Karen's son, Steve's nephew and is Ashley's brother.
- Daniel and David Kowalski - Are Walt's other two grandsons, Steve's sons, Mitch and Karen's nephews, and are cousins to Josh and Ashley.

=== Other characters ===
- Father Janovich (portrayed by Christopher Carley) - Father Janovich is a Catholic priest who tries to cajole Walt Kowalski into doing confession. Janovich works with the Hmong people in the community. Although Walt initially rebuffs Janovich's efforts, he persists and gradually comes to an understanding of Walt and his motives. Janovich constantly reminds Walt of his wife's desire for him to go to confession, which he does just before he dies. At the end of the film, he proclaims that only after knowing Walt did he really understand what life and death is. Amy Biancolli of the Houston Chronicle said that Janovich, who is "puppy-faced," "is a stock character cut from some truly flimsy cardboard — he can barely hold it together in two dimensions — but he’s a fair indicator of the movie’s best inclinations and worst flaws." Todd McCarthy of Variety said "Carley plays right into his priest's naivete." Mark Jenkins of National Public Radio said that Janovich was "baby-faced."
- Youa (portrayed by Choua Kue) - A young girl who becomes Thao's love interest. Walt refers to her as "Yum Yum".
- Martin (portrayed by John Carroll Lynch) - Martin is an Italian American barber who is a friend of Walt, and the two of them trade racist but good-natured barbs. McCarthy said that Lynch "has fun as the old-school barber."
- Trey (portrayed by Scott Eastwood, Clint's son in real life) - Trey appears in a single scene, as Sue's date.
- Baseball player hitting on Walt's TV (portrayed by Jason Garcia University of South Florida baseball player- Walt is watching TV on his couch)
