= Leo Sharp =

American horticulturist and drug courier (1924–2016)

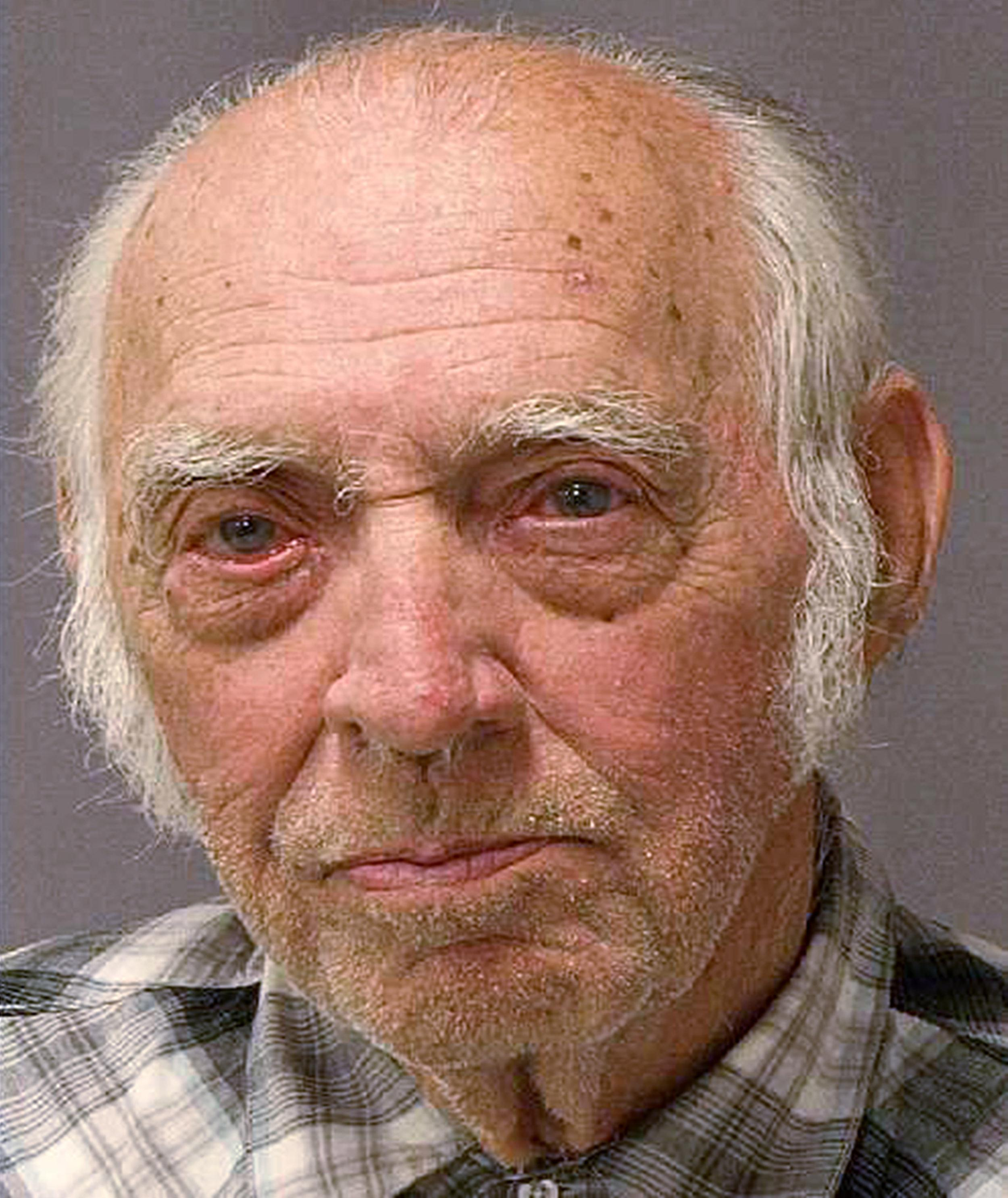
- Sharp in 2011
- Born: Leo Earl Sharp Sr. May 7, 1924; Michigan City, Indiana, U.S.
- Died: December 12, 2016 (aged 92); Michigan, U.S.
- Resting place: National Memorial Cemetery of the Pacific; Honolulu, Hawaii
- Other name: El Tata
- Occupations: Florist; Drug courier for the Sinaloa Cartel
- Known for: The world's oldest drug mule
- Conviction: Drug trafficking
- Penalty: 3 years, federal prison

Details
- Date apprehended: October 21, 2011
- Imprisoned at: 2014–2015, released after 1 year for humanitarian reasons
- Military career
- Branch: United States Army
- Rank: Private first class
- Unit: 88th Infantry Division
- Conflicts: World War II; Italian Campaign
- Awards: Bronze Star Medal

Leo Earl Sharp Sr. (May 7, 1924 – December 12, 2016), also known as El Tata, was an American World War II veteran, horticulturist, and drug courier for a branch of the Sinaloa Cartel.

Drug Enforcement Administration Special Agent Jeff Moore arrested Sharp in 2011 and was interviewed by The New York Times writer Sam Dolnick regarding the investigation into the world's oldest drug mule.

== Early life ==
Sharp was born in Michigan City, Indiana, and was raised in the city of Detroit, Michigan.

== Military service and honors ==
Sharp fought in the Italian Campaign in World War II and received a Bronze Star Medal for his service.

== Horticulturist career ==
Sharp claimed to have been an owner of a small airline company that eventually went bankrupt. He later became a horticulturist and florist known for hybridizing popular new breeds of flowers, specifically the daylily. He became world renowned for his hybridizing of popular new varieties of his flowers.

Sharp gained popularity for producing relatively small flowers with vibrant colors. His most popular creation was the Ojo Poco, a 2 1/2-inch (64 mm) apricot-colored flower with a red bullseye at the center that he introduced in 1994. "Anyone who has over 100 daylilies in their garden would recognize it by sight," Kevin P. Walek, a former president of the American Hemerocallis Society said. The daylily cultivar Hemerocallis 'Siloam Leo Sharp' is named after him.

Daylily enthusiasts visited Sharp's flower farm near Michigan City, Indiana where he lived for decades. Sharp's neighbors in Michigan City recalled buses filled with customers outside his front gate waiting to buy his signature flowers, almost all named after his business Brookwood Gardens.

Sharp traveled across the country for daily speaking engagements and conventions, and boasted at the time of his arrest that he had once been invited to the White House where he planted flowers in the Rose Garden for President George H. W. Bush.

== Drug running ==
Sharp became despondent from financial problems with his flower business and was subsequently approached by Mexican laborers at his Michigan farm who solicited him into transporting narcotics for the Sinaloa Cartel. He eluded the detection of law enforcement for over ten years while transporting thousands of pounds of cocaine, which catapulted him into urban legend among drug traffickers who knew of his exploits.

Sharp used a Lincoln Mark LT pickup truck to transport between 100 and 300 kilograms (220 and 660 lb) of cocaine at a time from the southern U.S. border to Detroit, Michigan. The cartel also used Sharp to transport drug proceeds in excess of two million dollars per return trip from Michigan to Arizona in the same pickup truck.

Sharp was arrested by Trooper Craig Ziecina from the Michigan State Police in October 2011 during a coordinated arrest operation led by the DEA; Sharp was in possession of 200 kilograms (440 lb) of cocaine. His arrest was captured on the dashcam of the Michigan State Police cruiser and published in the New York Times.

The criminal investigation was prosecuted by Assistant United States Attorney Chris Graveline in the Eastern District of Michigan, culminating with indictments of 25 members of the organization including Sharp.

Sharp was allowed to speak at his sentencing hearing before Judge Edmunds. He addressed the judge, "I’m really heartbroken I did what I did, but it’s done." In an effort to avoid prison, Sharp made a plea: instead of a custodial sentence, he proposed paying the $500,000 penalty that he owed the government by growing Hawaiian papayas. "It’s so sweet and delicious," he told the court. The court declined the offer and sentenced him to three years in prison. His defense stated that Sharp had dementia and would do poorly in prison. He was released in 2015 due to declining health after only serving a year of his sentence.

== Death ==
Sharp died of natural causes on December 12, 2016, in Michigan at the age of 92. He is buried at the National Memorial Cemetery of the Pacific in Honolulu.

== Trivia ==
The 2018 film The Mule is based on Sharp's life, with Clint Eastwood playing "Earl Stone" (based on Sharp) and Bradley Cooper playing "Colin Bates" (based on DEA agent Jeff Moore).
