= Siloam Springs (disambiguation) =

Siloam Springs may refer to:

- Siloam Springs, Arkansas
- Siloam Springs, Gentry County, Missouri
- Siloam Springs, Howell County, Missouri
- Siloam Springs Township, Howell County, Missouri

== See also ==
- Siloam Springs Cardinals (also known as the Buffaloes and the Travelers), a former minor league baseball team that represented Siloam Springs, Arkansas in the Arkansas–Missouri League and Arkansas State League from 1934–1940
- West Siloam Springs, Oklahoma
