= Greencastle (film) =

- Theatrical release poster
- Directed by: Koran Dunbar
- Screenplay by: Koran Dunbar
- Story by: Koran Dunbar; Hans Scharler
- Produced by: Hans Scharler
- Starring: Koran Dunbar; Doua Moua; Nikki Estridge; Aurelius Dunbar; Quevaughn Bryant; Jeannie Malone; Christopher James Raynor
- Cinematography: Jonathan Austin
- Edited by: Jonathan Austin
- Music by: John Cimino
- Production companies: Rages 2 Riches; Triahn Entertainment
- Release date: March 31, 2012
- Running time: 100 minutes
- Country: United States
- Language: English

Greencastle is a 2012 American drama film directed by, written by, and starring Koran Dunbar. The story follows Poitier Dunning, a single father who works as an Assistant Manager at a small town pet shop, as he enters a "quarter-life crisis" impelled by a recent tragedy. Greencastle intertwines lives of loneliness and disconnection, fatefully leading Poitier toward an unexpected and sublime awakening.

== Cast ==
- Koran Dunbar as Poitier Dunning
- Aurelius Dunbar as Julian Dunning
- Nikki Estridge as Leslie Davis
- Quevaughn Bryant as Poitier's Father
- Ralph Mauriello (actor)|Ralph Mauriello as Rocco Mazzagatti
- Doua Moua as Nu Vang
- Christopher James Raynor as Rick
- Hans Scharler as Roy Baker, District Dean

== Production ==
Filming took place in and around Greencastle, Pennsylvania and Philadelphia, Pennsylvania from June to August 2011. Greencastle premiered at the Maryland Theater in Hagerstown, MD on March 31, 2012. Jonathan Austin is the cinematographer for the film.
