= Baby's Day Out =

1994 film by Patrick Read Johnson

- Theatrical release poster
- Directed by: Patrick Read Johnson
- Written by: John Hughes
- Produced by: John Hughes; Richard Vane
- Starring: Joe Mantegna; Lara Flynn Boyle; Joe Pantoliano; Brian Haley
- Cinematography: Thomas E. Ackerman
- Edited by: David Rawlins
- Music by: Bruce Broughton
- Production company: Hughes Entertainment
- Distributed by: 20th Century Fox
- Release date: July 1, 1994 (United States)
- Running time: 99 minutes
- Country: United States
- Language: English
- Budget: $48 million
- Box office: $30 million

Baby's Day Out is a 1994 American crime comedy film directed by Patrick Read Johnson and written by John Hughes. Starring Joe Mantegna, Lara Flynn Boyle, Joe Pantoliano, and Brian Haley, the film centers on a wealthy baby's abduction by three clumsy criminals, and his subsequent escape and adventure throughout Chicago while being pursued by his kidnappers.

Released on July 1, 1994, by 20th Century Fox in the United States, Baby's Day Out was a box-office bomb, grossing only $30 million against a $48 million budget, and was panned by critics. However, it was a commercial success in the Indian subcontinent and has since gained a cult following.

== Plot ==
In Chicago, Bennington Austin "Bink" Cotwell IV is a nine-month-old baby who lives in a mansion with his socialite parents, Laraine and Bennington Austin "Bing" Cotwell III. Just as Bink is about to appear in the social pages of the local newspaper, a trio of criminals, consisting of Eddie Mancuso, Norby LeBlaw, and Veeko Riley, disguise themselves as baby photographers from the newspaper and kidnap Bink, holding him for a ransom of $5 million. At their hideout, Norby attempts to put Bink to sleep by reading his favorite storybook, Baby's Day Out, but falls asleep himself from boredom, leaving Bink unattended. Seeing a pigeon on one page of the book and then a real one by the window, Bink gets away from his kidnappers by following the pigeon out the window, prompting Eddie, Norby, and Veeko to pursue him.

The FBI, led by Dale Grissom, arrives at Bink's mansion and tries to piece together clues along with Bink's parents and his nanny, Gilbertine. Meanwhile, the criminals suffer from numerous near-death mishaps while chasing Bink across the city, who interprets various situations as scenes from his book, including boarding a blue bus; entering a department store where an employee mistakes him for another baby who escaped from the store's daycare center; escaping from the store afterward and heading to a zoo, where a western lowland gorilla shows a protective and paternal side towards him; and entering a construction site where, after experiencing more mishaps, the criminals give up on catching Bink and return home.

Bink's parents are notified of various sightings of him in the city. Gilbertine deduces he has been following Baby's Day Out and will most likely head for the old soldiers' home next, which proves to be correct as Bink has made his way there, where the elderly residents entertain him before Laraine and Bing joyously reunite with him. On the way home, Bink calls out for his book towards his kidnappers' apartment, where the recuperating criminals return Baby's Day Out before being arrested by the FBI for kidnapping Bink.

Back at home, Bink is put to bed by his parents, who discuss having his picture taken by a normal photographer in the morning. Unbeknownst to them, Bink wakes up and gets ready to read another storybook, titled Baby's Trip to China.

== Cast ==
- Adam Robert and Jacob Joseph Worton as Bennington Austin "Bink" Cotwell IV
  - Verne Troyer as Bink's stunt double
- Joe Mantegna as Edgar "Eddie" Mauser
- Joe Pantoliano as Norbert "Norby" LeBlaw
- Brian Haley as Victor "Veeko" Riley
- Lara Flynn Boyle as Laraine Cotwell
- Matthew Glave as Bennington Austin "Bing" Cotwell III
- Cynthia Nixon as Gilbertine
- Fred Thompson as FBI Agent Dale Grissom
- Robin Baber as Obese Woman
- John Neville as Mr. Andrews
- Mike Starr as JoJo Ducky
- Trevor Dalton as Norm
- Eddie Bracken as Mr. Tinsel, Old Soldier
- Dawn Maxey as Young Employee
- Anna Thomson as Mrs. McCray
- John Alexander as the gorilla's in-suit performer
  - Jugen Heimann, Tom Hester, Mark Setrakian and Marc L. Taylor assisted in the gorilla's face performance.
- Neil Flynn and William Homes as Cops in the Park

== Production ==
Baby's Day Out was filmed in Chicago, Illinois and Los Angeles, California from August 17 to December 17, 1993, and featured one of the earliest fully computer-generated 3D cityscapes, which was a challenge for Industrial Light & Magic. Senior digital artist Henry LaBounta said: “We had to have a CG city – Chicago – for those shots where the baby’s looking down from the crane. I was the guy that was going to be making that city. And I was like, I just started here." Visual effects supervisor John Knoll responded "Yeah, but you’re the 3D expert guy," causing LaBounta to realize that he was coming in on his first show as one of the experts on the team, as most of the people he was working with only had experience with 2D compositing.

== Reception ==
=== Critical response ===
The film was generally received poorly by critics. On Rotten Tomatoes, it has a "Rotten" score of 32% based on 19 reviews. Audiences polled by CinemaScore gave the film an average grade of "A" on an A+ to F scale.

Roger Ebert of Chicago Sun-Times gave the film one-and-a-half stars out of four, writing that "Baby's Day Out contains gags that might have worked in a Baby Herman cartoon, but in live action, with real people, taxis, buses, streets, and a real baby, they're just not funny. The Worton twins are adorable as Baby Bink, however; the audience produced an audible coo the first time they saw him on the screen." However, his partner on the Siskel & Ebert show, Gene Siskel, liked the film, calling it an "absolute perfect child's-eye view of the fantasies that they might have."

Writing for The Washington Post, Hal Hinson said that "the pace is quick and efficient but never frantic ... almost everything in the picture is just right, including the two-bit crooks who abduct the superhero toddler and end up bruised and begging hilariously for mercy. Best of all, though, is the Binkman himself, whose tiny face is so expressive that he brings new meaning to the phrase 'conquering with a smile.'"

=== Box office ===
The film opened with takings of $4,044,662 at the start of July 1994. It grossed $16,827,402 at the box office in the United States and Canada and $13.4 million internationally for a worldwide total of $30.2 million, a disappointing return considering its $48 million production budget.

=== Year-end lists ===
- 1st worst – Melinda Miller, The Buffalo News
- Top 10 worst (not ranked) – Dan Webster, The Spokesman-Review

=== International remakes and legacy ===
Baby's Day Out was a popular film in South Asia. Recalling a visit to Kolkata in 1999, Roger Ebert said that the owner of a large theater told him that Baby's Day Out was their most successful film, running full for more than 17 weeks. It was remade in Telugu in 1995 as Sisindri, in Hindi as Ek Phool Teen Kante in 1997, in Malayalam in 1999 as James Bond, and in Sinhalese as Onna Babo in 2002.

The film was mentioned in the 2026 Disney+ series Wonder Man. One of the actors from Baby's Day Out, Joe Pantoliano, also portrays a fictionalized version of himself in the series, who is shown to be unusually proud of the film, to Simon Williams' and Trevor Slattery's confusion. After being fed up with Pantoliano's condescending attitude towards Slattery, Simon scolds him, before criticizing Baby's Day Out, saying "even a baby couldn't make you funny."

== Home media ==
20th Century Fox Home Entertainment released the film on VHS on April 4, 1995, and on DVD on January 29, 2002. Special features include Patrick Read Johnson's commentary, a featurette, and a trailer for it. It was re-released on DVD on October 11, 2011.

== Cancelled video game ==
A video game adaptation of the film was planned, completed and slated to be released on Super Nintendo Entertainment System, Sega Genesis and Game Boy in October 1994, but was canceled shortly before release. Instead of playing as Bink, the player would have controlled his guardian angel to guide him to safety in the vein of Pac-Man 2: The New Adventures. Despite its cancellation, an advertisement for the game is included on the film's VHS release. Two prototypes of the Sega Genesis port have surfaced online in subsequent years and the Game Boy version was found within the 2020 Nintendo data leak, but the Super NES version remains lost.
