= Tabor Creek =

Stream in the American state of Missouri

Location
- Country: United States
- State: Missouri
- Region: Douglas County and Howell County

Physical characteristics
- Source
  - coordinates: 36°48′20″N 91°55′06″W
  - elevation: 1,240 ft (380 m)
- Mouth
  - coordinates: 36°48′03″N 92°08′39″W
  - elevation: 709 ft (216 m)

Tabor Creek is a stream in Douglas and Howell, within the Ozarks region of southern Missouri.

The stream's source is approximately six miles northwest of West Plains, just north of Missouri Route 14. From there, the stream flows southwest, passing under Route 14 and one mile south of the community of Grimmet. It then turns west, entering the Mark Twain National Forest and meandering west approximately one mile south of Siloam Springs. Turning northwest, the stream enters the southeast corner of Douglas County and continues west to its confluence with Spring Creek about one half mile north of Spring Creek's confluence with the North Fork River.

Tabor Creek was named for the Tabor family, who relocated to the area from Kentucky before the Civil War.
