= Brian Haley =

American actor and comedian

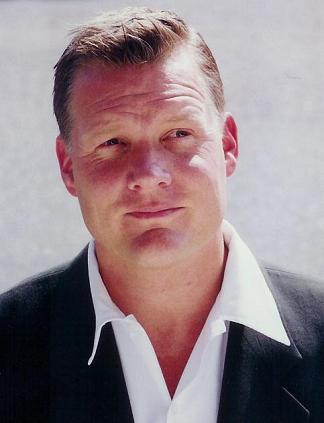
- Haley circa 2001
- Born: Brian Carlo Haley; February 12, 1963 (age 63); Seattle, Washington, U.S.
- Occupations: Actor; comedian
- Years active: 1988–present
- Spouse: Marj McCoshen Haley (m. 1987)
- Children: 5

Brian Carlo Haley (born February 12, 1963) is an American actor and comedian. His stand-up act is characterized by playing his all-American looks against manic outbursts and absurd situations. As an actor, he may be best known for his roles as Veeko the incompetent kidnapper in the movie Baby's Day Out, the over-the-top football father Mike Hammersmith (aka Spike's dad) in Little Giants, Mitch Kowalski in the movie Gran Torino, and Budd Bronski in Season 7 of Wings.

== Early life ==
Haley was born in Seattle, Washington to a large Catholic family, the fifth of six children. His father was an airline executive and his mother was a homemaker and part-time maid. His father is of Irish and Italian descent, which is where he gets his Italian middle name Carlo. At the age of three his family moved to Saint-Jovite, Quebec and he was put in a boarding home where he learned to speak fluent French. He disliked the experience so much that upon his return to Seattle 18 months later, he refused to speak the language except to translate for his younger sister, who only spoke French. He began acting as a child in the Seattle area doing community and school theater. As a teenager, he stumbled upon the film set of Scorchy (1976) in downtown Seattle. After seeing some of the movie being filmed, jumping into a few shots as an extra and meeting the star, Connie Stevens, he decided to pursue a career in show business.

At 15 he moved to rural Ellensburg, Washington. After high school, he took on several jobs, including lumberjack, hay buck, and ranch hand. He eventually enlisted in the U.S. Army to join the Green Berets. He was in the service from 1980 to 1985 where he won letters of commendation and the Army Achievement Medal, but left early to pursue a career in show business. While in the Army (1983), he was in the play Guys and Dolls starring Joe Namath at the Ft. Bragg Playhouse.

== Career ==
After his tour in the Army, he began doing stand-up comedy in his native Seattle and quickly rose to headliner status. In 1988, he moved to Los Angeles where he had immediate success, winning a "Hollywood's Hottest New Comic" competition, appearing on several stand-up comedy TV shows such as An Evening At The Improv and was picked up by ABC Television for a one-year holding deal. In July 1988, Haley was a contestant on the Alex Trebek hosted game show "Classic Concentration". His appearance spanned multiple episodes as he won $11,285 worth of prizes. However, it was his proverbial big break on The Tonight Show Starring Johnny Carson in 1990 that launched his career in earnest. His first appearance led to a flood of television and film roles and an HBO comedy special.

In 1994, he starred in the movie Baby's Day Out. The movie was very popular in overseas markets, especially India, where it played at the largest theater in Calcutta for over a year and was even remade with an Indian cast under the title Sisindri. In 1994, he had a stand out role in the comedy film Little Giants as over the top dad Mike Hammersmith, aka "Spike's Dad".

In 1995, he replaced Thomas Haden Church on NBC's TV series Wings playing the part of mechanic Budd Bronski. That same year he was in a Clio Award winning Super Bowl ad for Miller Lite beer playing hard luck football quarterback Elmer Bruker, a man that was on every winning Super Bowl team but never played. In 1997, he portrayed "The Hooded Avenger" on the Weird Al Show. From 1998 to 1999 he played bartender Tom Vanderhulst on the short lived CBS series Maggie Winters. He has made numerous guest appearances on TV shows such as 30 Rock, The Drew Carey Show, and ER, including reoccurring roles on The Hughleys, Third Watch and Law & Order: Criminal Intent.

In 1998, Haley played firefighter Roger Parks in the episode "Fire Station 32" in Beyond Belief: Fact or Fiction.

He has been cast frequently in dramatic roles, playing a detective in the Coen Brothers film The Man Who Wasn't There and Martin Scorsese's The Departed and Police Captain Hill in Tony Scott's The Taking of Pelham 123. In 2003, he was cast in the television pilot for the CBS one-hour drama The Brotherhood of Poland, New Hampshire as one of three brothers along with Randy Quaid and John Carroll Lynch, but was replaced later by Chris Penn due to story restructuring and his lack of similarity to the other two brothers. In 2008, he played Clint Eastwood's discontented son Mitch in the award-winning movie Gran Torino.

In February 2007, he appeared on Broadway as tennis commentator Ryan Becker in the Terrence McNally play Deuce, directed by Michael Blakemore.

He currently lives in New York City and has a production company, Haleywood Productions.

He is currently doing the commentary, along with Tim Kitzrow for NFL Blitz.

== Personal life ==
Haley is married since 1988 to Marj McCoshen. The couple have five children. He owns the Frank Sinatra booth and several other items from Chasen's restaurant. He is active with the relief organization World Vision.

== Selected filmography ==
- The Caine Mutiny Court-Martial (1988, TV Movie) – Party Guest
- Always (1989) – Alex
- Into the Sun (1992) – Lieutenant DeCarlo
- Clean Slate (1994) – Patient
- Baby's Day Out (1994) – Victor "Veeko" Riley
- Little Giants (1994) – Mike Hammersmith
- Mars Attacks! (1996) – Mitch, Secret Service Agent
- That Darn Cat (1997) – Marvin
- Wings (1995–1996, TV Series) – Budd Bronski
- McHale's Navy (1997) – Christy
- The Weird Al Show (1997, TV Series) – The Hooded Avenger
- The Thirteenth Year (1999, TV Movie) – Coach
- The Man Who Wasn't There (2001) – Officer Krebs
- Pearl Harbor (2001) – Training Captain
- The Departed (2006) – Detective #2 Tailing Queenan
- Gran Torino (2008) – Mitch Kowalski
- The Taking of Pelham 123 (2009) – Police Captain Hill (MTA)
- The Adjustment Bureau (2011) – Officer Maes
- Draft Day (2014) – NFL Commissioner (uncredited)
- The Amazing Spider-Man 2 (2014) – Phil Watson (scenes deleted)
- Courting Des Moines (2016) – Sec. Todd Voss
- Law & Order (2022) – Senator Alan Chandler
