= Roosevelt, Missouri =

Unincorporated community in Missouri, U.S.

Coordinates: 36°49′50″N 92°07′25″W

Roosevelt is an unincorporated community in extreme southeastern Douglas County, Missouri, United States. Roosevelt lies on the east bank of Spring Creek on County Road 289, approximately 1.5 miles northeast of the junction of state routes 14 and 181 at Twin Bridges within the Mark Twain National Forest.

== History ==
A post office called Roosevelt was in operation from 1904 until 1937. The community has the name of Theodore Roosevelt, 26th President of the United States.
