= Doua Moua =

American actor and writer (born 1987)

Doua Moua 𖬑𖬲𖬞𖬰 𖬑𖬲𖬦
- Born: February 7, 1987 (age 39); Nakhon Si Thammarat, Thailand
- Education: Marymount Manhattan College
- Occupations: Actor, Filmmaker
- Years active: 2004-present
- Known for: Gran Torino, Mulan

Doua Moua (RPA: Duas Muas, Pahawh: 𖬑𖬲𖬞𖬰 𖬑𖬲𖬦; born February 7, 1987) is an American actor and writer best known for his roles as Spider in the 2008 film Gran Torino and Po in Disney's live-action Mulan.

== Background ==
Doua Moua was born in a refugee camp in Thailand to Laos-born parents of Hmong descent who had fled their homeland because of the Laotian Civil War. Six months after his birth, his family entered Minnesota as refugees, and he was raised in the city of St. Paul. While in middle school, Doua joined the choir and theater classes at a teacher's suggestion; he also participated in community theater. He was graduated from the International School of Minnesota, in Eden Prairie.

Amongst Doua Moua's cousins are former state senator Mee Moua and dancer-actor Aidan Prince.

== Career ==
Moua moved to New York City to pursue a career in acting and booked his first acting job as an extra on Law and Order: SVU. Moua worked in an Italian restaurant to finance his career. He continued auditioning for minor roles until he decided to audition for Gran Torino. While most roles took about a week for call backs, Doua had to wait three months until he finally got a response. The film's casting was considered "a catalyst for more Hmong to get into filmmaking". Moua said that he had no regrets in playing as a gang member, since, in the words of Laura Yuen of Minnesota Public Radio, "gangs consumed his brother's life while they were growing up in St. Paul." Moua added that many first generation Hmong are affected by gangs and drift into gangs due to a lack of father figures.

After the release of Gran Torino, Doua continued to appear in film and television, noticeably as villains. When his parents asked why he continued to play "mean" people, he jokingly stated that his parents had given him "mean eyebrows" due to his heritage. He decided to create a movie based on his own personal life as a Hmong American in Minnesota due to the lack of Hmong representation. The film, The Harvest, was written by Doua and was to be directed by Dan Ireland starring Doua alongside Russell Wong and Ellen Wong. Ireland has since died with Li Lu reportedly directing. The movie is still in development.

Doua was cast in the live action Disney adaptation of Mulan as Po. He is also a writer and was a semi-finalist for the Academy's Nicholl's Fellowship for his coming-of-age script "The Harvest."

== Filmography ==
Television roles
| Year | Title | Role | Notes |
|---|---|---|---|
| 2007 | The Naked Brothers Band | Chinese Thug | Uncredited; Episode: "Alex's Clothing Line" |
| 2008 | The Captive | Hmong Guard | TV movie |
| 2009 | Michael & Michael Have Issues | Hakitori | Uncredited; 1 episode |
| 2010 | Blue Bloods | Big Eyes | 2 episodes |
| 2015 | Chinese Food | Young Park | TV Pilot |
| 2015 | One Bad Choice | KO | Episode: "Meili Cady" |
| 2016 | Criminal Minds: Beyond Borders | Unsub | Episode: "The Harmful One" |
| 2017 | Marvel's Iron Fist | Warrior Guard #1 | Episode: "The Blessing of Many Fractures" |
| 2017 | Veep | Questioner | Episode: "Groundbreaking" |

Film roles
| Year | Title | Role | Notes |
|---|---|---|---|
| 2004 | Pals | Ming | Short film |
| 2004 | Stealing Summer | Foreign Guy | |
| 2005 | Factotum | Spectator | Uncredited |
| 2005 | Don't Whistle | Tou | Short film |
| 2007 | PBI: Paranormal Bureau of Investigation | Coco | Short film |
| 2008 | Uncertainty | Internet Cafe Clerk | |
| 2008 | Gran Torino | Spider | |
| 2008 | Resolve | Lieutenant | Short film |
| 2009 | Karma Calling | Chinese Restaurant Employee | |
| 2009 | Lalo | Chinese Food Delivery Person | Uncredited; Short film |
| 2009 | Super Sunday | Alex | Short film |
| 2009 | Prisoners | Danny Kim | Short film |
| 2009 | Ex Schemes | Aaron | Short film |
| 2009 | Across Dot Ave. | Coffee Shop Employee | |
| 2010 | The Last Airbender | Earthbender Guard | Uncredited |
| 2010 | King's Man | Hong | |
| 2011 | Dirty Movie | Wing Thai | |
| 2011 | I Am Julia | Noah | Short film |
| 2011 | hItec! | Choggys West | Short film |
| 2012 | Greencastle | Nu Vang | |
| 2012 | Sparrow Lane | Bobby Miller | Short film |
| 2014 | The City at Night | Tsheej | Short film |
| 2014 | Foodie Fight | John | Short film |
| 2015 | Tracers | Skinny Jeans | |
| 2015 | Memoria | Takeshi Motoki | |
| 2016 | Smartass | Desk Clerk | |
| 2016 | One Shot | Scott Lawless | Short film |
| 2018 | Tournament | Lung | |
| 2019 | Itsy Bitsy | Wounded Man | |
| 2020 | Reality Queen! | Klarc Kim | |
| 2020 | Mulan | Po | |

Filmmaking credits
| Year | Title | Director | Producer | Writer | Other |
|---|---|---|---|---|---|
| 2014 | I Die, I Dim, I Shine | Yes | Yes | No | |
| 2016 | Static | Yes | Yes | Yes | |
| 2016 | Bedeviled | No | No | No | Special thanks |
| 2017 | Dining Table | Yes | Yes | Yes | |
| 2017 | Midnight Clear | No | Associate | No | |
