= Koran Dunbar =

American film director

Koran Dunbar is an American actor, director, screenwriter, and comedian. His recent work is Greencastle, where Dunbar is the writer, director, and lead actor.

== Early life ==
Dunbar is originally from Hartford, Connecticut, and moved to Greencastle, Pennsylvania when he was a child with his grandparents, Elmer Dunbar and the late Ellen Dunbar.

== Filmography ==
=== Film work ===
Year	Film	Credited as				
Year	Film	Director	Writer	Producer	Actor	Role
2012	Greencastle	Yes	Yes	Yes	Yes	Poitier Dunning
