= Osborn, Detroit =

Community in Detroit, Michigan, US

Coordinates: 42.4368°N 83.0011°W

Osborn is a community in northeast Detroit, Michigan. The Skillman Foundation selected Osborn to be one of the neighborhoods covered by the Good Neighborhoods Initiative.

Osborn is bounded by 8 Mile Road, McNichols Road, Gratiot Avenue, and Van Dyke Avenue.

In 2012, Jeff Siedel of the Detroit Free Press said "The neighborhood surrounding Osborn High School looks like a cracked, empty shell. Everywhere you look, there are broken windows, overgrown weeds, barbed wire fences and abandoned homes."

== History ==
An April 2011 report from the office of Mayor of Detroit Dave Bing said that gangs, "especially transient gangs that are less organized — and often, randomly violent — terrorize some of our neighborhoods including … Osborn,"

In 2012, as part of the 100 Houses project, volunteers boarded up various vacant houses in Osborn.

== Demographics ==
As of 2012, according to the Detroit Center for Family Advocacy the median family income was $32,421. Single parents are the heads of over 30% of Osborne families, while in the U.S. the national percentage is 9.1%. Of children born to parents living in Osborn, 22.4% were born to teenage parents. 35.7% of Osborn residents are children who live in poverty, while 13.9% of all Michigan residents are children in poverty.

A 2010 report from Data Driven Detroit, City Connect Detroit, stated that Osborn had 27,166 residents. The community was 91.3% black, 4.3% white, 2.1% Asian (mostly Hmong people), 1.4% reporting more than one race, and .7% Hispanic and Latino.

According to the 2000 U.S. census Osborn had 37,358 people, with 84.1% being black, and 8.6% white. There were 1,700 Hmong people in Osborn. Between the 2000 census and the 2010 U.S. census the population experienced a 27.3% decline. The number of children and youth in Osborn decreased by 5,912, a 39.3% decline. The number of African-Americans decreased by 21.1%, but proportionately became a higher percentage of the community. The numbers of White, multiethnic, and Asian/Hmong groups had the most severe declines. The white population declined by 64%. The Asian population declined by 66%, with most moving from Osborn settled in Macomb County.

== Education ==
Osborn is within the Detroit Public Schools. The Pulaski, Brenda Scott, and Trix K-8 schools in Osborn and Law K-8 School outside Osborn serve Osborn for elementary and middle school. Most of Osborn is zoned to Osborn High School while a portion is zoned to Pershing High School.

Elementary schools formerly serving Osborn within Osborne included Fleming, Genesis EL/MS, Richard, and Von Steuben. Schools outside of Osborn formerly serving it included Grant EL/MS. Middle schools formerly serving Fleming included Genesis EL/MS and Farwell; Farwell was outside of Osborn.

Fleming is now the Fleming Administration Building. The Early Childhood / Pre-Kindergarten Office is based out of the Fleming Administration Building. Other than that, it now is only used for Head Start Program and Great Start Readiness Program classrooms, as well as the headquarters of the GSRP in DPS.

== Parks and recreation ==
Parks in Osborn include Bessy Playfield, Wish Egan Playfield, Marruso Playground, Calimera Park and the Lipke Recreation Center. Bessy Playfield is adjacent to Brenda Scott School.

Calimera Park is the home of the Edible Hut Edible Hut. The Edible Hut is a community gathering space in Calimera Park on the eastside of Detroit with a living, edible roof and oculus to the sky. The Edible Hut combines elements of a traditional hut, an outdoor sculpture, a neighborhood garage and an edible garden. The roof is a garden of edible perennial plants such as sage, thyme, lavender and oregano. The inside of the space incorporates peaceful colors to create an enchanting space for gathering, rest and pleasure.
