= Nick Schenk =

American screenwriter (born 1965)

- Born: November 12, 1965 (age 61); Minneapolis, Minnesota, U.S.
- Education: Minneapolis College of Art and Design
- Occupation: Screenwriter
- Partner: Jena Ramsay

Nick Schenk (born November 12, 1965) is an American screenwriter known for writing the Clint Eastwood-directed feature film Gran Torino in 2008 for which he won Best Original Screenplay from the National Board of Review. He continued his collaborations with Eastwood on The Mule (2018) and Cry Macho (2021).

== Early life ==
Schenk was born in Minneapolis, Minnesota, and grew up in the neighboring city of Fridley. He graduated from the Minneapolis College of Art and Design in 1989.

== Career ==
During the mid-1990s, he played the character of Butch the Janitor on the television series, Let's Bowl, during its initial syndicated run. He went on to be a writer for the series during its run on Comedy Central from 2001 to 2002. He also made appearances in small roles during this time.

In 2007, Nick Schenk was a writer and producer for Bodog Fight (the mixed-martial arts competition television show) when his screenplay for Gran Torino was optioned by Jenette Kahn. When Clint Eastwood read it, he not only decided to direct and star in it but he also insisted that not a word be changed by the studio. Subsequently, the only script changes made were to tailor it to the location where it was shot (Michigan) as opposed to Minnesota where it was originally set.

On February 26, 2021, Nick signed on with the representative company Management 360.

In 2022, Schenk wrote and executive produced a sequel to the 1983 film A Christmas Story entitled A Christmas Story Christmas for Warner Bros. Pictures and HBO Max.

== Filmography ==
=== Films ===
Nick Schenk's film credits
Year	Title	Credited as	Director	Ref(s)
2008	Gran Torino	Story, screenplay	Clint Eastwood	
2014	The Judge	Story, screenplay	David Dobkin	
2018	The Mule	Screenplay	Clint Eastwood	
2021	Cry Macho	Screenplay	Clint Eastwood	
2022	A Christmas Story Christmas	Story, screenplay, executive producer	Clay Kaytis	
TBA	Bitcoin	Screenplay	Doug Liman	

=== Television ===
Nick Schenk's television credits
Year	Title	Notes	Ref(s)
2015	Narcos	"Written by" – 2 episodes	
2016	Harley and the Davidsons	"Teleplay by" – 2 episodes; "Story by" – 1 episode	
2017; 2020	Manhunt	"Story by" – 1 episode; "Written by" – 2 episodes	
