= Noblett Creek =

Stream in the American state of Missouri

Location
- Country: United States
- State: Missouri
- Region: Douglas County and Howell County

Physical characteristics
- Source
  - coordinates: 36°59′32″N 92°00′02″W
- Mouth
  - coordinates: 36°52′57″N 92°06′19″W
  - elevation: 820 ft (250 m)

Noblett Creek is a stream in Douglas and Howell counties in the Ozarks of southern Missouri.

The stream source is located just to the southwest of Willow Springs and about a quarter of a mile south of Missouri Route 76. The stream flows southwest and enters the Mark Twain National Forest less than a half mile from its source. The stream continues to the southwest with numerous incised meanders and enters Douglas County about six miles from its source. Just after entering Douglas County the stream crosses Missouri Route AP and is impounded as Noblett Lake. About one mile below the Noblett Lake recreation area and dam the stream reaches its confluence with Spring Creek, a tributary to the North Fork River.

Noblett Creek has the name of an early settler.

== See also ==
- List of rivers of Missouri
