= Siloam Springs, Howell County, Missouri =

- Unincorporated community
- Location of Siloam Springs, Missouri Siloam Springs (the United States)
- Coordinates: 36°47′44″N 92°04′32″W
- Country: United States
- State: Missouri
- County: Howell
- Elevation: 1,060 ft (320 m)
- Time zone: UTC-6 (Central (CST))
  - Summer (DST): UTC-5 (CDT)
- Area code: 417
- GNIS feature ID: 752156

Siloam Springs is an unincorporated community in western Howell County, Missouri, United States. It is located approximately two miles south of Route 14 on Missouri Route T, just east of the southeastern corner of Douglas County and fifteen miles northwest of West Plains. Waters from the associated spring flow west and enter Tabor Creek, which then flows into Spring Creek, a tributary to the Norfork River in the southeast corner of Douglas County. The site is at an elevation of 1,060 ft (320 m).

A post office called Siloam Springs was established in 1879, and remained in operation until 1969. The community was named after a nearby mineral spring of the same name, which was named after the Pool of Siloam.
