= Bee Vang =

American actor (born 1991)

Bee Vang 𖬃𖬰𖬨𖬵 𖬖𖬰𖬜
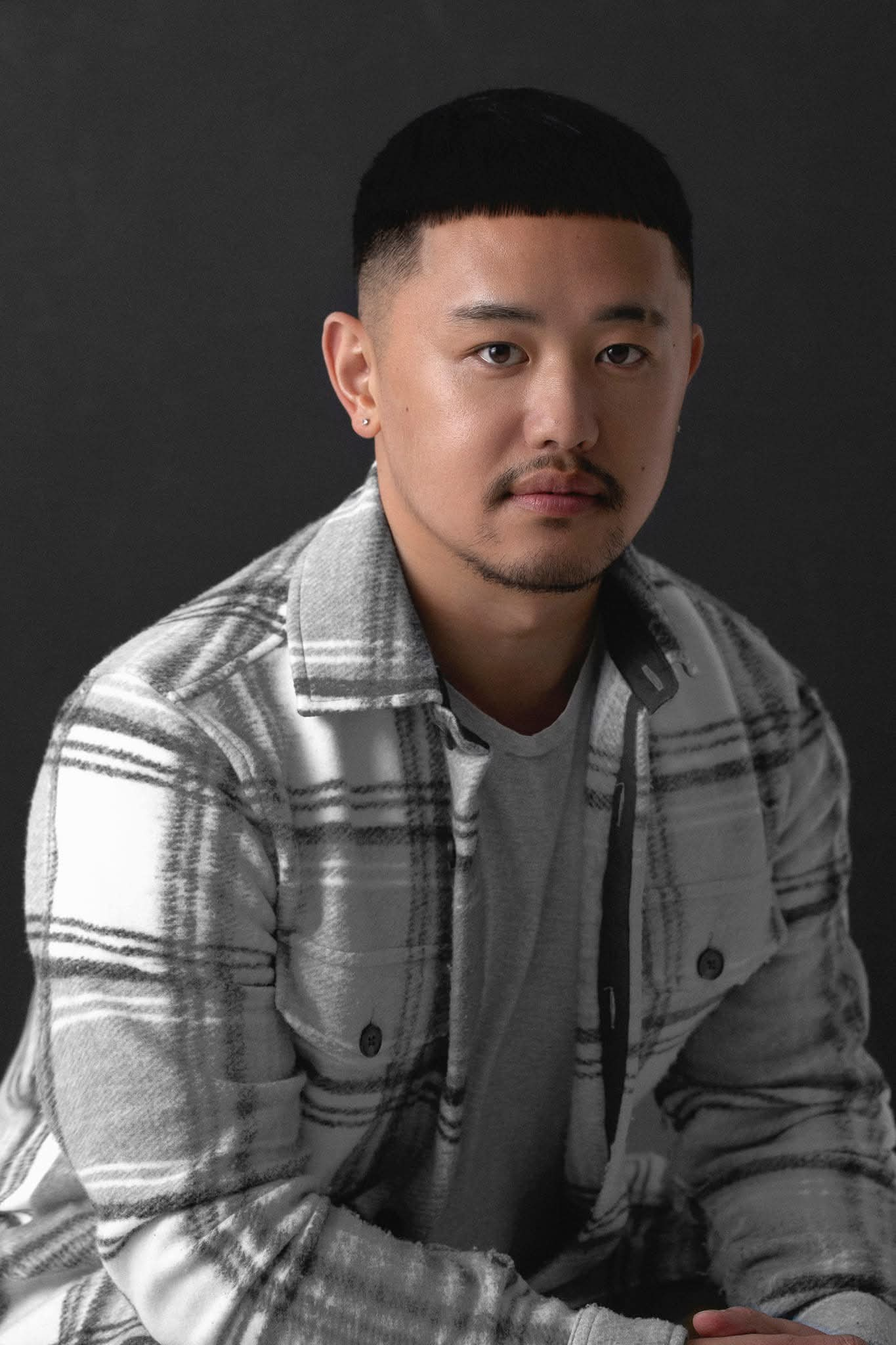
- Bee Vang in 2025
- Born: November 4, 1991 (age 34); Fresno, California, U.S.
- Occupation: Actor
- Years active: 2008–present

Bee Vang (RPA: Npis Vaj, Pahawh: 𖬃𖬰𖬨𖬵 𖬖𖬰𖬜; born November 4, 1991) is an American actor of Hmong descent. He is best known for starring in Clint Eastwood's 2008 film Gran Torino as Thao Vang Lor.

== Early life and education ==
Vang was born in Fresno, California, four years after his Hmong parents emigrated from Thailand. He has five brothers and one sister.

Vang resided in the Twin Cities area. He grew up in a neighborhood in Minneapolis that he described as "poor." He later lived in Robbinsdale, Minnesota. In his earlier years, he attended Webster Open, a middle school in Minneapolis where he took theater classes. For his freshman year he attended Camden High School, and he was in the University of Minnesota's advanced program. He also attended Robbinsdale Armstrong High School in Plymouth, Minnesota.

As a youth, Vang mainly watched Asian films. He also watched Clint Eastwood westerns and was a fan of Eastwood.

Vang attended Brown University in Providence, Rhode Island. He graduated from Brown "with a degree in international politics, political economy and media and cultural studies".

== Career ==
Vang auditioned for the Clint Eastwood film Gran Torino "on a lark". He had no prior acting experience. More than 2,000 actors auditioned for the role that Vang eventually received. He learned later that he had been selected because of his "innocent looks and slight build". The film is notable for being "the first major Hollywood portrayal of Hmong families". Vang portrayed Thao Vang Lor, "a mild-mannered Hmong teenager who as part of a gang initiation tries to steal the prized 1972 Gran Torino of his next-door neighbor, a surly Korean War veteran" played by Eastwood. Gran Torino grossed nearly $270 million worldwide.

In 2009, Vang stated that Gran Torino was "generally accurate in its portrayal of Hmong, a highlands people who fought for the U.S. during the Vietnam War and later emigrated from Southeast Asia and settled in Minnesota, Wisconsin and California". In later years, Vang spoke extensively against the film's use of anti-Asian slurs and its portrayal of Hmong people. By 2010, Vang had become an activist. He collaborated on social justice film, Internet, and print products with Louisa Schein, a Hmong media expert, Va-Megn Thoj, a Hmong filmmaker, and Ly Chong Thong Jalao, a University of California Santa Barbara Ph.D. student. He traveled around the United States doing public speaking regarding Gran Torino and post-Gran Torino issues related to the Hmong community. Vang also wrote a 2011 editorial criticizing a KDWB radio comedy segment, saying that it portrayed Hmong people in an offensive manner. In 2021, Vang stated that he did not regret his role in Gran Torino, but noted that he did not see "a place for 'Gran Torino' in this day and age". Vang added: "'I couldn't possibly imagine the film being made in this moment...where you know there's a lot of violent language used against Asian bodied people. It's not OK'".

Since Gran Torino, Vang has appeared on Modern Family and acted in independent films and stage performances. Vang acted in a YouTube parody of one scene in Gran Torino, titled "Thao Does Walt: Lost Scenes from Gran Torino". In addition, he acted in "Anatomically Incorrect", "Fallen City", and "Sunset on Dawn".

Vang returned to cinema in 2020 with a role in Comisery, an apocalyptic Asian-American science fiction comedy. In 2021, he was cast in a lead role in a horror comedy entitled Dark Christmas.

== Filmography ==
Year	Film	Role	Notes
2008	Gran Torino	Thao Vang Lor	
2011	Modern Family	Himself	

== See also ==
- History of the Hmong in Fresno, California
- History of the Hmong in Minneapolis–Saint Paul
