= Spring Creek (North Fork River tributary) =

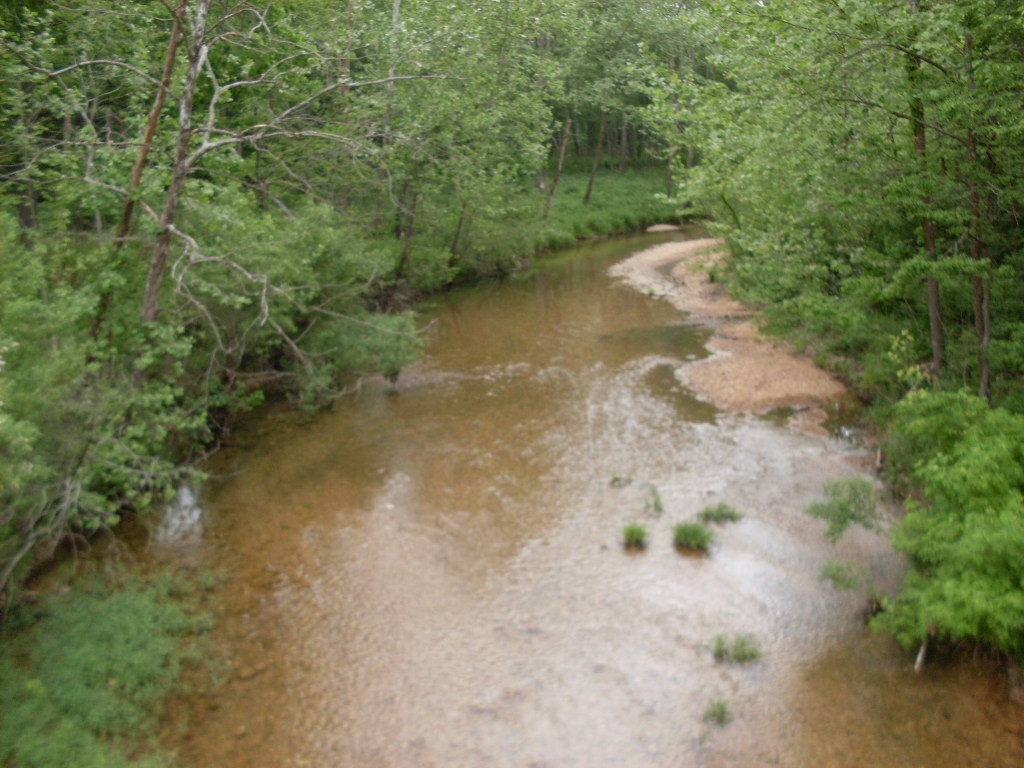
- Missouri Route AP crossing of Spring Creek in western Howell County, Missouri

Location
- Country: United States
- State: Missouri
- Region: Douglas County and Howell County

Physical characteristics
- Source
  - coordinates: 36°55′22″N 92°00′31″W
  - elevation: 1,047 ft (319 m)
- Mouth
  - coordinates: 36°47′48″N 92°08′51″W
  - elevation: 705 ft (215 m)

Basin features
- Tributaries
  - left: Tabor Creek
  - right: Noblett Creek

Spring Creek is a stream in Douglas and Howell counties in the Ozarks of southern Missouri.

The stream source is the confluence of the North Fork Spring Creek and South Fork Spring Creek in Howell County about 2.5 miles west of the community of Burnham and five miles southwest of Willow Springs. The stream is entirely within the Mark Twain National Forest. The stream flows west-southwest passing under Missouri Route AP and enters Douglas County just southeast of the Noblett Lake Recreation Area and receives the flow of Noblett Creek as it turns to the south-southwest. The stream is fed by numerous springs as it flows past the community of Roosevelt. The stream passes under Missouri Route 14 just east the route 14 - route 181 junction at Twin Bridges and reaches its confluence with the North Fork River just north of the Douglas - Ozark county line.
