= Bitcoin (film) =

Upcoming American film

- Directed by: Doug Liman
- Written by: Nick Schenk
- Produced by: Ryan Kavanaugh; Lawrence Grey; Shane Valdez
- Starring: Casey Affleck; Pete Davidson; Gal Gadot; Isla Fisher; Finlay Robertson
- Cinematography: Henry Braham
- Production companies: Proxima Media; Aperture Media Partners; KavBro Pictures; ACME AI
- Country: United States
- Language: English

Bitcoin is an upcoming American biographical thriller film directed by Doug Liman and written by Nick Schenk. It stars Casey Affleck, Pete Davidson, Gal Gadot, Isla Fisher, and Finlay Robertson.

== Cast ==
- Casey Affleck as Craig Steven Wright
- Pete Davidson as Calvin Ayre
- Gal Gadot as Charlotte "Lotte" Miller
- Isla Fisher
- Finlay Robertson as Balthazar Harrington III
- Paul Wallner as Hans Schniebling

== Production ==
In August 2025, it was announced that Doug Liman would be directing a biographical conspiracy thriller film based on bitcoin cryptocurrency and its developer Satoshi Nakamoto, titled Killing Satoshi. Nick Schenk wrote the script, with Casey Affleck and Pete Davidson cast in lead roles. Calvin Ayre, the crypto and gambling figure portrayed by Pete Davidson, is providing a significant portion of the film's financing. Principal photography began in February 2026 in the United Kingdom, when Gal Gadot was cast as Charlotte "Lotte" Miller, Isla Fisher in an undisclosed role, and Finlay Robertson as Balthazar Harrington III. By that time, the film had been renamed to Bitcoin. That same month, it was reported that the film would use artificial intelligence to use locations and to adjust performances. The sets would be entirely made of A.I. backgrounds instead of real world locations, and the actors would be working a markerless performative capture stage using new technologies. Producer Ryan Kavanaugh claimed the use of A.I. cut the cost of the film by an estimated $230 million, also suggesting that industry pushback has been minimal, while anti-artificial intelligence activists have criticized the production for its reliance on A.I. technology. Filming wrapped in late April, with Henry Braham serving as the cinematographer.
