= The International School of Minnesota =

Location
- 6385 Beach Road; Eden Prairie, Minnesota 55344; United States; 44.890159°N 93.436875°W

Information
- Type: Private Boarding & Day College Preparatory
- Religious affiliation: Nonsectarian
- Established: 1985; 41 years ago
- Head of school: Nadia Reda
- Faculty: 80
- Grades: Pre-school – 12th
- Gender: Co-educational
- Enrollment: 338
- Student to teacher ratio: 1:10
- Education system: SABIS Network
- Campus size: 55 acres (22 ha)
- Campus type: Suburban
- Color
- Team name: Huskies
- Website: www.internationalschoolmn.com

The International School of Minnesota (ISM) is a private, coeducational, nonsectarian PS–12 college preparatory residential and day school, established in 1985. ISM is located on a 55-acre campus in Eden Prairie, MN, southwest of the Twin Cities (Minneapolis/St. Paul) area of Minnesota.

== History ==
ISM's history dates back to when The SABIS Network began in 1886 when the International School of Choueifat was founded in the village of Choueifat, Lebanon. There, the founders, Reverend Tanios Saad and Ms. Louisa Proctor wanted to provide basic education for Lebanese girls. The school later became co-educational.

The International School of Choueifat grew and expanded outside Lebanon in the mid-1970s. This evolved into a global network consisting of schools in 16 countries on four continents. Today, the SABIS Network is managed by individuals and overseen by three independent corporations headquartered in the U.S., Lebanon, and the U.A.E. SABIS is also expanding to Latin and South America, with plans to open schools in Panama in March 2017 and Brazil in 2018.

After its incorporation in 1985, SABIS Educational Systems, INC. established a range of schools in the United States starting in the private sector and expanding into the public sector. The first of these schools was The International School of Minnesota. The establishment of ISM was followed by the founding of many charter schools in the U.S.

== Academics ==
=== Overview ===
The International School of MN is a private academic institution that is a member of the SABIS School Network. Since 1985, ISM has been providing students a college-preparatory education. They have a rich cultural diversity and students and staff represent over 40 countries and 30 languages. ISM's students receive daily instruction in world Languages taught by native speakers. By graduation, ISM students master at least one world language in addition to English.

Students participate in standardized tests such as the National Educational Records Bureau, Advanced Placement, ACT, ACT Aspire, and SAT tests and consistently score in the upper percentiles which helps them to have a 100% college acceptance rate. Many ISM graduates have been accepted into U.S. colleges such as Cornell University, Dartmouth College, University of Pennsylvania, Harvard University, NYU, UC Berkeley, and Stanford University as well as colleges outside the U.S. such as Tokyo International University, University of British Columbia, University of Edinburgh and Thammasat University, and The American University of Paris.

In 2015 and 2016, ISM was ranked as the top private school in Minnesota as well as the most challenging school in the state of Minnesota.

=== World Language ===
All students at ISM have daily World Language instruction given by native speakers and they have the opportunity to take AP courses in Language and Literature for World Languages. ISM offers Spanish, French, and Chinese to their students and students who are not native-English speakers are provided ELL Language Courses. Students in grades 4–8 are able to attend Concordia Language Villages for each language, if they choose.

- Spanish students can participate in the National Spanish Examinations.
- French students can participate in Le Grand Concours each year as well as A Vous la Parole (a French-speaking contest) at The University of Minnesota.
- Chinese students organize an annual Chinese New Year celebration.

=== SABIS Student Life Organization ===
ISM has The SABIS Student Life Organization as a part of the SABIS Educational System that emphasizes real-life experiences and skills. It is a student-led society that participates in every day roles and tasks to teach responsibility and accountability. It also emphasizes organizational, managerial, academic, and leadership skills and how to balance all of those together while participating in academic and non-academic activities. For example: peer tutoring, planning events, community service projects, school newspaper and yearbook.

=== Advanced Placement ===
ISM offers eighteen Advanced Placement Courses listed here: Art History, Biology, Calculus AB, Calculus BC, Chinese Language & Culture, Computer Science Principles, English Language & Composition, English Literature & Composition, European History, French Language & Culture, Government & Politics: United States, Human Geography, Music Theory, Physics C, Spanish Language, Spanish Literature & Culture, Statistics, and Studio Art: Drawing.

On average, students at ISM complete seven AP courses by graduation; during the 2014–15 school year, fourteen AP scholars, two AP scholars with Honor, twelve AP scholars with Distinction, and three National AP scholars. Over 92% of AP Exams received scores of 3 or higher.

=== Accreditations ===
- Accreditation International
- National Council for Private School Accreditation
- Middle States Association of Colleges and Schools
- Middle States Association – Commissions on Elementary & Secondary Education

== Residence hall ==
ISM opened a residence hall in the Fall of 2014. It is 20,000 square feet (1,900 m^{2}) and 3 stories tall. Since its opening, it has housed students from China, Ivory Coast, Korea, Nigeria, Spain, Algeria, Cambodia, United Arab Emirates, Russia, Taiwan, Thailand, Vietnam and the United States. Residence Hall managers plan weekly outings for the students who reside in the Residence Hall. It houses up to thirty-two students; it has a theater, recreation center, laundry room, study areas, and a fitness center.

== Athletics ==
ISM offers fall, winter, and spring sports including:

- Fall: soccer, volleyball, and cross country.
- Winter: basketball.
- Spring: track & field, golf, badminton and ultimate frisbee.

School teams participate in the Minnesota State High School League (MSHSL), Minnesota Classic Athletic Association (MCAA), and/or drama. Each year, they have a play in the Fall and an all-school musical in the Spring. In past years, they have done musicals such as Oklahoma!, Shrek The Musical, and Cinderella. They also have choral and instrumental concerts spread throughout the year. Their All-School Musical in 2015 received "Outstanding" and "Honorable Mention" awards from The Hennepin Theater Trust, which recognizes performers across the state of Minnesota.

ISM offers many course(s) in performing arts as well as non-performing. Some offered are concert choir, show choir, vocal jazz ensemble, band, strings, show choir band, theater workshop, and after-school music lessons. They also have some non-performing courses including music theory and music history. Show choir sings popular music and is choreographed and they go on a tour each year – they went to Walt Disney World in Orlando, Florida in February 2016 and they also traveled to Puerto Rico to perform in 2015. Half of the student body participates in some sort of ensemble.

== Extracurricular opportunities ==
- National Honor Society
- National Junior Honor Society
- SABIS Student Life Organization
- FIRST Robotics Competition
- Destination Imagination
- Math League
- Ski & Snowboard Club

== Notable alumni ==
- Doua Moua – actor
- Oliver Paine – Ukrainian refugee
- Alejandro Mesa Dame – theoretical physicist
- Spencer Hutchins – alternative food scientist
- Aarya Batchu – child actor

== External links/social media ==
- Official School Website
- Facebook
- Twitter
- YouTube
