= Siloam daylilies =

Group of cultivars of daylily flowers

Siloam daylilies are cultivars of daylilies registered with the American Hemerocallis Society by Pauline Henry of Siloam Springs, Arkansas. Mrs. Henry registered over 450 daylilies during her lifetime. Most of her daylilies were given a name beginning with the word "Siloam", hence "Siloam Daylilies".

== History ==
Pauline Henry registered her first daylilies in 1963 with Siloam Satin, Siloam Splendor and Siloam Springs. Siloam Double Classic earned the prestigious Stout Silver Medal in 1993, the society's highest award. She remained active in daylilies for the remainder of her life; registering 15 cultivars in her final year, dying on September 20, 2000, at the age of 92.

Siloam daylily cultivars are still very popular. Today's hybridizers are still cultivating Siloam daylilies as many of the new cultivars of daylilies have been crossed with a Siloam daylily.

== See also ==
- Leo Sharp – horticulturist notable for his eponymous cultivar of Siloam daylily.
