= Saturn Award for Best DVD or Blu-ray Collection =

Annual US media award

The Saturn Award for Best Film Collection Release (formerly Saturn Award for Best DVD Collection and Saturn Award for Best DVD/BD Collection Release) is an award given by the Academy of Science Fiction, Fantasy and Horror Films to a movie collection on DVD and/or Blu-ray. The collections can be either a series of movies, even a franchise, or movies that have the same actor or director. The following is a list of winners of this award:

Year	Film Collection	Ref.
2003 (30th)	The Adventures of Indiana Jones: The Complete DVD Movie Collection	
2003 (30th)	Alien Quadrilogy	
2003 (30th)	The Jack Ryan Special Edition DVD Collection	
2003 (30th)	Lon Chaney Collection (TCM Archives)	
2003 (30th)	The Mystery Science Theater 3000 Collection, Volumes 2−4	
2003 (30th)	X-Men Collection	
2004 (31st)	Star Wars Trilogy	
2004 (31st)	The Best of Abbott and Costello, Volumes 1−3	
2004 (31st)	The Marx Brothers Silver Screen Collection	
2004 (31st)	The Monster Legacy Collections	
2004 (31st)	The Tarzan Collection	
2004 (31st)	The Ultimate Matrix Collection	
2005 (32nd)	The Bela Lugosi Collection	
2005 (32nd)	Batman: The Motion Picture Anthology (1989−1997)	
2005 (32nd)	The Hammer Horror Series	
2005 (32nd)	The Harold Lloyd Comedy Collection, Volumes 1−3	
2005 (32nd)	The Mystery Science Theater 3000 Collection, Volumes 7−8	
2005 (32nd)	The Val Lewton Horror Collection	
2006 (33rd)	James Bond 007 Ultimate Edition, Volumes 1−4	
2006 (33rd)	The Boris Karloff Collection	
2006 (33rd)	The Exorcist: The Complete Anthology	
2006 (33rd)	The Premiere Frank Capra Collection	
2006 (33rd)	Hollywood Legends of Horror Collection	
2006 (33rd)	Superman: Ultimate Collector's Edition	
2007 (34th)	The Mario Bava Collection, Volumes 1−2	
2007 (34th)	The Godzilla Collection	
2007 (34th)	The Sergio Leone Anthology	
2007 (34th)	The Sonny Chiba Collection	
2007 (34th)	Stanley Kubrick: Warner Home Video Directors Series	
2007 (34th)	Vincent Price: MGM Scream Legends Collection	
2008 (35th)	The Godfather: The Coppola Restoration	
2008 (35th)	Abbott & Costello: The Complete Universal Pictures Collection	
2008 (35th)	Dirty Harry: Ultimate Collector's Edition	
2008 (35th)	Ghost House Underground: 8-Film Collection	
2008 (35th)	Mystery Science Theater 3000: 20th Anniversary Edition	
2008 (35th)	Planet of the Apes: 40th Anniversary Collection	
2009 (36th)	Star Trek: Original Motion Picture Collection	
2009 (36th)	Columbia Pictures Film Noir Classics I	
2009 (36th)	The Hannibal Lecter Anthology	
2009 (36th)	Hellraiser: Boxed Set	
2009 (36th)	Icons of Sci-Fi: Toho Collection	
2009 (36th)	The William Castle Film Collection	
2010 (37th)	Alien Anthology	
2010 (37th)	Back to the Future: 25th Anniversary Trilogy	
2010 (37th)	Clint Eastwood: 35 Films 35 Years at Warner Bros.	
2010 (37th)	Fantômas: 5-Film Collection	
2010 (37th)	Film Noir Classic Collection, Volume 5	
2010 (37th)	Vengeance Trilogy	
2011 (38th)	Stanley Kubrick: The Essential Collection	
2011 (38th)	Jurassic Park: Ultimate Trilogy	
2011 (38th)	The Lord of the Rings: The Motion Picture Trilogy − Extended Edition	
2011 (38th)	Star Wars: The Complete Saga	
2011 (38th)	Superman: The Motion Picture Anthology (1978−2006)	
2012 (39th)	Universal Classic Monsters: The Essential Collection	
2012 (39th)	Alfred Hitchcock: The Masterpiece Collection	
2012 (39th)	Battle Royale: The Complete Collection	
2012 (39th)	Bond 50: The Complete 22-Film Collection	
2012 (39th)	Dark Shadows: The Complete Original Series	
2012 (39th)	The Ultimate Buster Keaton Collection	
2013 (40th)	Chucky: The Complete Collection	
2013 (40th)	The Bowery Boys Collection, Volumes 2−3	
2013 (40th)	Friday the 13th: The Complete Collection	
2013 (40th)	James Dean: Ultimate Collector's Edition	
2013 (40th)	Mad Max Trilogy	
2013 (40th)	Zatoichi: The Blind Swordsman (The Criterion Collection)	
2014 (41st)	Halloween: The Complete Collection	
2014 (41st)	The Exorcist: The Complete Anthology	
2014 (41st)	Stanley Kubrick: The Masterpiece Collection	
2014 (41st)	Steven Spielberg: Director's Collection	
2014 (41st)	The Toho Godzilla Collection	
2014 (41st)	Universal Classic Monsters: Complete 30-Film Collection (1931−1956)	
2015 (42nd)	The Frank Darabont Collection	
2015 (42nd)	Hammer Horror Classics, Volume 1	
2015 (42nd)	Jurassic Park Collection	
2015 (42nd)	Mad Max Anthology	
2015 (42nd)	Nikkatsu Diamond Guys, Volume 1	
2015 (42nd)	Special Effects Collection	
2016 (43rd)	Frankenstein: Complete Legacy Collection	
2016 (43rd)	Buster Keaton: The Shorts Collection (1917−1923)	
2016 (43rd)	The Herschell Gordon Lewis Feast	
2016 (43rd)	The Marx Brothers Silver Screen Collection	
2016 (43rd)	Pioneers of African-American Cinema	
2016 (43rd)	The Wolf Man: Complete Legacy Collection	
2017 (44th)	Dracula: Complete Legacy Collection	
2017 (44th)	Abbott & Costello Rarities	
2017 (44th)	Adventures of Captain Marvel	
2017 (44th)	Christopher Nolan Collection (4K UHD)	
2017 (44th)	Fritz Lang: The Silent Films	
2017 (44th)	The Mummy: Complete Legacy Collection	
2017 (44th)	OSS 117: 5-Film Collection	
2018/2019 (45th)	Universal Classic Monsters: Complete 30-Film Collection (1931−1956)	
2018/2019 (45th)	The Bloodthirsty Trilogy	
2018/2019 (45th)	The Complete Sartana	
2018/2019 (45th)	Jack Ryan: 5-Film Collection (4K UHD)	
2018/2019 (45th)	The Matrix Trilogy (4K UHD)	
2018/2019 (45th)	The Pink Panther: Cartoon Collection, Volumes 1−6	
2019/2020 (46th)	Godzilla: The Showa-Era Films, 1954−1975 (The Criterion Collection)	
2019/2020 (46th)	Abbott & Costello: The Complete Universal Pictures Collection (80th Anniversary Blu-ray Edition)	
2019/2020 (46th)	The Fly Collection	
2019/2020 (46th)	Gamera: The Complete Collection	
2019/2020 (46th)	Hitchcock: British International Pictures Collection	
2019/2020 (46th)	Laurel & Hardy: The Definitive Restorations	
2019/2020 (46th)	Three Fantastic Journeys by Karel Zeman (The Criterion Collection)	
2021/2022 (50th)	Universal Classic Monsters: Icons of Horror Collection, Volume 1 (4K UHD)	
2021/2022 (50th)	The Alfred Hitchcock Classics Collection, Volume 2 (4K UHD)	
2021/2022 (50th)	Francis the Talking Mule: 7-Film Collection	
2021/2022 (50th)	The Godfather Trilogy (4K UHD)	
2021/2022 (50th)	Shawscope, Volume 1	
2021/2022 (50th)	Val Lewton Double Feature: The Ghost Ship / Bedlam (Warner Archive Collection)	
2022/2023 (51st)	Superman: 5-Film Collection (1978−1987) [4K UHD]	
2022/2023 (51st)	Arsène Lupin Collection	
2022/2023 (51st)	Irwin Allen: Master of Disaster Collection	
2022/2023 (51st)	Mr. Wong Collection	
2022/2023 (51st)	Shawscope, Volume 2	
2022/2023 (51st)	Universal Classic Monsters: Icons of Horror Collection, Volume 2 (4K UHD)	
2022/2023 (51st)	Warner Bros. 100th Anniversary 25-Film Collection, Volume 4: Thrillers, Sci-Fi & Horror	
2023/2024 (52nd)	Batman: 85th Anniversary Collection (4K UHD)	
2023/2024 (52nd)	Nature Run Amok Collection	
2023/2024 (52nd)	OSS-117: 5-Film Collection	
2023/2024 (52nd)	Republic Pictures Horror Collection	
2023/2024 (52nd)	Rocky: Ultimate Knockout Collection (4K UHD)	
2023/2024 (52nd)	Sci-Fi Chillers Collection	
2024/2025 (53rd)	The Pink Panther Peter Sellers Comedy Collection (4K UHD)	
2024/2025 (53rd)	007: James Bond − Sean Connery 6-Film Collection (4K UHD)	
2024/2025 (53rd)	The Abbott & Costello Horror Film Collection (4K UHD)	
2024/2025 (53rd)	A Nightmare on Elm Street: 7-Film Collection (4K UHD)	
2024/2025 (53rd)	Teenage Mutant Ninja Turtles Trilogy (4K UHD)	
2024/2025 (53rd)	Terror in the Fog: The Wallace Krimi at CCC	

== Multiple nominations ==
- Mystery Science Theater 3000 - (3 nods, no wins)
