= Cry Macho =

1975 American novel by N. Richard Nash

- First edition cover
- Author: N. Richard Nash
- Original title: Macho
- Language: English
- Genre: Adventure
- Set in: Mexico City (1978)
- Publisher: Delacorte Press
- Publication date: June 11, 1975
- Publication place: United States
- Media type: Print
- Pages: 302
- ISBN: 0-440-04996-2
- OCLC: 1144762
- Dewey Decimal: 813'.5'4
- LC Class: PZ4.N254CR

Cry Macho is a 1975 American novel by N. Richard Nash published in the United States by the Delacorte Press. The story was originally written as a screenplay under the title Macho, but was later adapted into a novel after Nash failed to sell the script. The book follows Mike Milo, a Texas rodeo star tasked with kidnapping an eleven-year-old boy in Mexico named Rafo. The story centers around the themes of loss, love, and redemption, all surrounding Mike's journey alongside Rafo.

Following its publication, Cry Macho was met with mixed to positive reviews from novel critics. Since its release, multiple filmmakers attempted to adapt the novel into a feature film. After previously rejecting the role in 1988, Clint Eastwood produced, directed, and starred in an adaptation of the novel that was released by Warner Bros. Pictures on September 17, 2021. The film was met with mixed reviews from critics and also underperformed at the box office.

== Plot ==
Michael "Mike" Milo is a divorced alcoholic and experienced rodeo star in Galveston, Texas. Suffering from tennis elbow and severe headaches, Mike arrives late to the rodeo stadium he works at, run by Howard Polk. Participating in an event where he attempts to "ride out" a horse, Mike is trampled and hospitalized with a broken leg.

At the hospital, Mike reflects on losing his parents at the age of five, dropping out of college after his grandparents died in a house fire, working alongside his first employer who once tasked him with putting down a dozen horses, and his eventual path into becoming a rodeo cowboy.

A few weeks later, Mike is discharged from the hospital with a weak leg. Upon returning to the stadium, Mike is surprised to find out that he has been laid off. The next day, Mike finds out that his ex-wife Donna has remarried. Saddened by the news, Mike sells most of his awards and prized possessions at a local bar.

Following his divorce five years ago, Howard lost custody of his only son, Rafael "Rafo" Polk, who was then sent to Mexico to live with his mother. Howard meets with Mike and attempts to persuade him into kidnapping Rafo and transporting him back to Texas, promising $50,000 through ransom money from Rafo's mother. Initially rejecting the offer, Mike remembers the time he unsuccessfully defended a prostitute named Cissy Brewer from Ewell Macmillian, the former owner and co-founder of the rodeo stadium, who forced a horse onto Cissy. Ewell was given a suspended sentence, and he was replaced by Howard shortly after. Cissy, who had been traumatized by the event, became homeless and mentally ill. In the present, Mike decides to help Howard retrieve his son.

After being given a Chevrolet Suburban, Mike drives down the Pan-American Highway and arrives in Mexico City, where he finds Rafo living in a large house with his mother, Alexandra "Lexa" Muños de Santis Polk, in the Lomas de Chapultepec. At midnight, while sneaking into the home, Mike becomes dizzy and suffers a fall that knocks him unconscious. Upon regaining consciousness, Mike finds himself being tended to by Lexa, who is aware of his intentions. Lexa reveals to Mike that Rafo does not live with her, and instead lives as a gambling thief out in the streets. Mike then departs from the home and begins his search for Rafo.

A few days later, Mike finds Rafo participating in a cockfight in Tepito. Before he can talk to him, the event is interrupted by a police raid and Rafo runs away. Shortly after, Mike finds Rafo's white rooster, Macho, which he uses to bait Rafo into talking with him at a cafe. Once there, Rafo agrees to travel to Texas to reunite with his father Howard. The next day, following a short altercation, the pair begin their journey to the southern border, where they plan to pass illegally.

In San Luis Potosí, Mike has his panel truck, money, and Macho stolen by a group of thieves. Using a public bus as transportation, the pair arrive in Janasco, where Mike finds and recovers his stolen truck and Macho. The next day, the pair meet and befriend Marta, a poor widow with whom Mike becomes intimate. After Marta suffers severe burns due to the burning of her jacal, Mike and Rafo depart from Janasco.

Driving towards the border, the pair stop after noticing a patrol car following them. As they wait, a vulture snatches and flies away with Macho, to Rafo's dismay. That night, the pair are confronted by two officers from the national patrol, who search the car and interrogate Rafo about his intentions of traveling to the United States. After Rafo lies about his plan to meet his father at the border, the officers follow the pair to a motel, with the intent of hearing the confirmation of the statement through a phone call.

At the motel, Howard refuses to admit his involvement with Mike, resulting in the arrests of both Mike and Rafo, for kidnapping and petty theft, respectively. Allowed to stay at the motel until dawn, Rafo learns that his father wanted to be with him simply to battle Lexa in court for her money. In the morning, the pair go their separate ways, with Mike continuing his journey to Texas, while Rafo returns to Janasco. To ensure Rafo's safety, Mike has the officers pursue him to Texas. Realizing Mike has crossed the border into the US, the officers decide to dismiss the case to avoid punishment for their failures.

Despite suffering a gunshot wound to his shoulder during the chase, Mike decides to return to Mexico in the hopes of reuniting with Rafo.

== Major themes ==
The Southwest Review's Arthur Ramirez said the novel had various similarities to Nash's 1954 play The Rainmaker, among them "a dusty setting and spiritually and emotionally drained characters." Ramirez concluded that the major theme of the novel was the acceptance of loss, with Mike having to face his "fear, anxiety, and an inferiority complex" while in Mexico.

== Background ==
Originally written as a screenplay under the title Macho, N. Richard Nash adapted the story into a novel after failing to sell the screenplay.

"I had a screenplay called Macho that no one wanted. It occurred to me to do a quick novelization. I got a $10,000 advance and completed it as Cry Macho in two weeks. It got surprisingly good reviews and the instant they appeared, three studios, all of which had rejected the screenplay, started to bid for this awful, little thing. I sold the rights to one. When they asked me to do the screenplay, I gave them what they had rejected -- didn't change a word -- and they loved it!"

— N. Richard Nash in an interview with the Orlando Sentinel

On June 11, 1975, Cry Macho was published in the United States by the Delacorte Press, a publishing company in New York. In 1978, Nash specified to The Boston Globe that it was actually 20th Century Fox who had rejected the original screenplay twice, before accepting it when he "only changed four pages."

== Reception ==
Following its release, Cry Macho received mixed reviews from critics. Writing for the Kirkus Reviews magazine, an anonymous writer summarized the novel as "straight storytelling, perhaps a bit sentimental." Comparing the novel to C. W. Smith's Country Music, Henry L. Alsmeyer Jr. wrote: "Cry Macho is more interesting, and, indeed, some fun," noting that there was "both story and character development." Furthermore, from the St. Louis Post-Dispatch, Dennis Brown wrote that the story was "neither so profound nor so compelling as its book jacket would suggest. But, once south of the border, the novel offers a consistently arresting adventure story." Jonathan Rosenbaum submitted the film to the Sight & Sound Poll as one of his "Ten Best Films of 2021".

Writing for the El Paso Herald-Post, Elory Bode said that Cry Macho was "a good novel by a writer who has a solid grasp of his craft." A journalist from The Northwest Arkansas Times and Pattie Lambert from the Rocky Mount Telegram both described the novel as being able to combine "strong action with strong compassion". Additionally, C.L.L from the South Bend Tribune wrote that "It seems likely that Cry Macho eventually will show up as an action motion picture with better-than-average plot and characterization."

== Adaptation attempts ==
In 1988, Clint Eastwood was offered the opportunity to star in an adaptation of the novel but instead opted out to reprise as Dirty Harry in The Dead Pool. Following a failed attempt by Roy Scheider in 1991, Vulture reported in 2011 that Brad Furman had been set to direct a Cry Macho adaptation produced by Al Ruddy. The film, which had been announced at the 2011 Cannes Film Festival and had cast Arnold Schwarzenegger in the lead role, was cancelled shortly after Schwarzenegger's divorce with Maria Shriver. Nine years later, in 2020, it was announced that Eastwood would direct, produce, and star in an adaptation of the novel for Warner Bros. Pictures and HBO Max. On October 27, 2020, it was reported that the film would be shot in New Mexico, with production taking place for two months starting that November. Additional cast members include Dwight Yoakam as Howard Polk, Eduardo Minett as Rafo, Natalia Traven as Marta, Fernanda Urrejola as Leta (Rafo's mother), and Horacio Garcia Rojas as Aurelio.

Clint Eastwood's Cry Macho was theatrically released by Warner Bros. Pictures on September 17, 2021. On the review aggregator website Rotten Tomatoes, 57% of 178 critics' reviews are positive, with an average rating of 5.6/10. The website's consensus reads: "Cry Macho proves Clint Eastwood remains an economic filmmaker and charismatic screen presence – albeit one who's an awkward fit for this particular project."
