= Clint Eastwood filmography =

Clint Eastwood
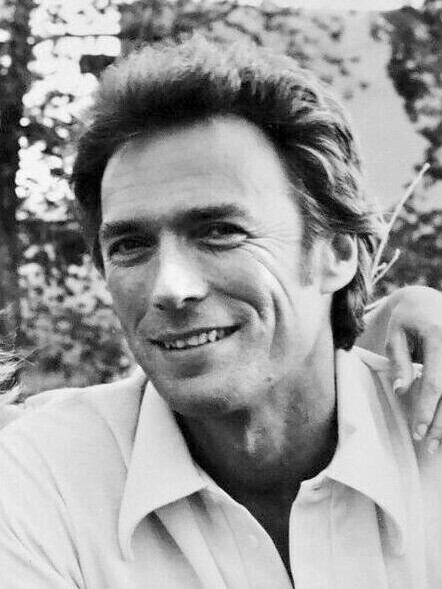
- Eastwood in 1976
- Born: Clinton Elias Eastwood Jr. May 31, 1930 (age 96); San Francisco, California, United States
- Occupations: Actor; Film director; Film producer
- Years active: 1954–2024

Clint Eastwood is an American retired actor, director, producer, singer, composer, and lyricist. He appeared in over 60 films in a career that spanned 72 years and began with small uncredited film roles and television appearances. Eastwood has acted in multiple television series, including the eight-season series Rawhide (1959–1965). Although he appeared in several earlier films, mostly uncredited, his breakout film role was as the Man with No Name in the Sergio Leone–directed Dollars Trilogy: A Fistful of Dollars (1964), For a Few Dollars More (1965), and The Good, the Bad and the Ugly (1966), which weren't released in the United States until 1967/68. In 1971, Eastwood made his directorial debut with Play Misty for Me. Also that year, he starred as San Francisco police inspector Harry Callahan in Dirty Harry. The film received critical acclaim, and spawned four more films: Magnum Force (1973), The Enforcer (1976), Sudden Impact (1983), and The Dead Pool (1988).

In 1973, Eastwood starred in another western, High Plains Drifter. Three years later, he starred as Confederate guerrilla and outlaw Josey Wales in The Outlaw Josey Wales. In 1978, Eastwood starred opposite an orangutan in the action-comedy Every Which Way but Loose. Although it received largely negative reviews, the film was a financial success, his highest-grossing film at that time, and generated a sequel, Any Which Way You Can. In 1979, Eastwood portrayed prisoner Frank Morris in the Don Siegel–directed Escape from Alcatraz.

Eastwood's debut as a producer began in 1982 with two films, Firefox and Honkytonk Man. In 1985, Eastwood directed Pale Rider, which was the highest-grossing western of the 1980s. Eastwood also has contributed music to his films, either through performing or composing. He received the Academy Awards for Best Director and Best Picture for his 1992 western Unforgiven. In 2003, Eastwood directed an ensemble cast, including Sean Penn, Tim Robbins, Kevin Bacon, Laurence Fishburne, Marcia Gay Harden, and Laura Linney, in Mystic River. For their performances, Penn and Robbins respectively won Best Actor and Best Supporting Actor, making Mystic River the first film to win both categories since Ben Hur in 1959. In 2004, Eastwood once again won the Academy Awards for Best Picture and Director, this time for Million Dollar Baby starring Hilary Swank. In 2006, he directed the companion war films Flags of Our Fathers and Letters from Iwo Jima, which depict the Battle of Iwo Jima from the perspectives of the U.S. and Japan, respectively. In 2008, Eastwood directed and starred as protagonist Walt Kowalski in Gran Torino. His most recent acting role was for the film Cry Macho (2021), which he also directed and produced for Warner Bros. Pictures, a studio he worked with from 1971 up until 2024 for Juror #2.

Throughout his career, Eastwood has received numerous accolades. In 1996, Eastwood was a recipient of the AFI Life Achievement Award. In 2006, he received the Stanley Kubrick Britannia Award for Excellence in Film from the BAFTA. A 2009 recipient, he was awarded the National Medal of Arts in 2010, the highest such honor given by the United States government.

== Film ==
Clint Eastwood
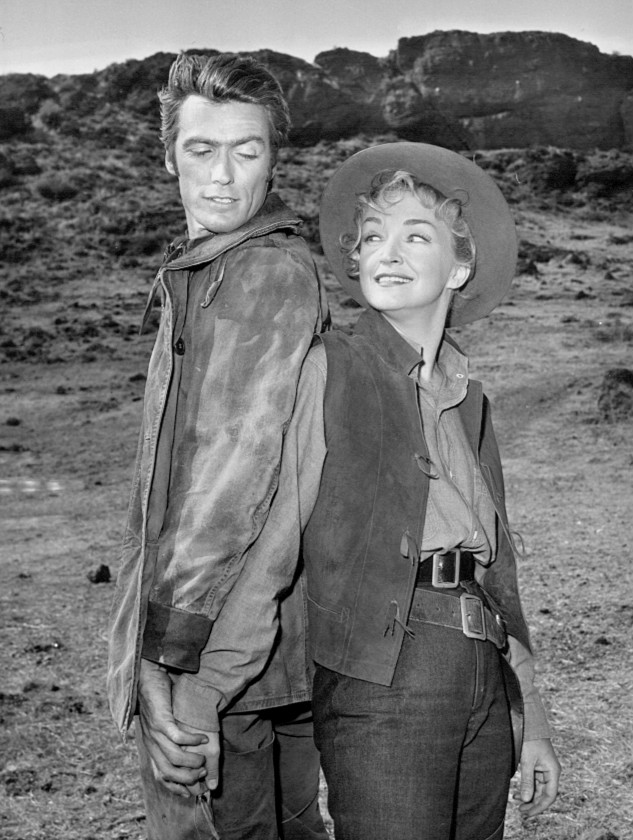
Eastwood with Nina Foch on the set of Rawhide (1959)

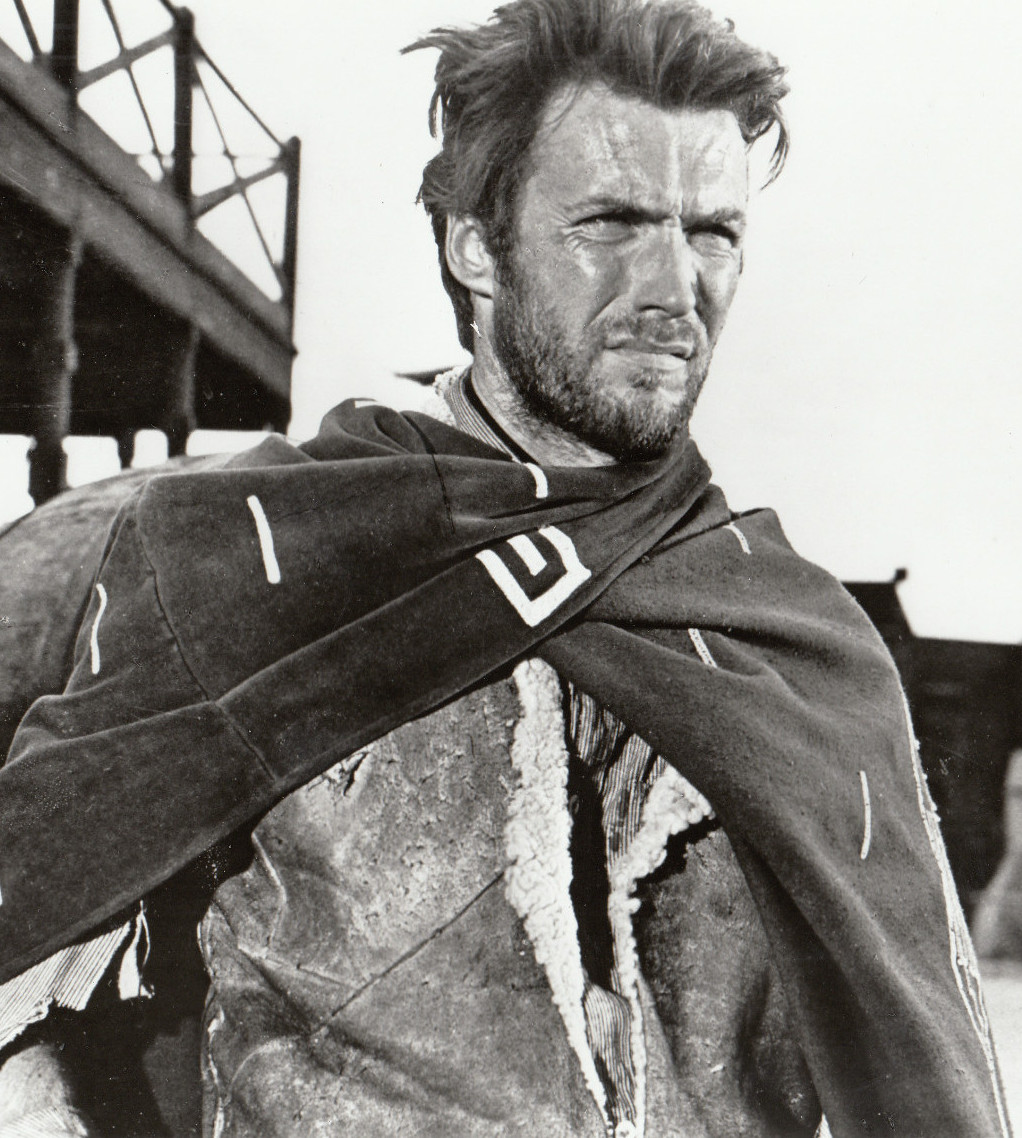
Eastwood as the Man with No Name in A Fistful of Dollars (1964)

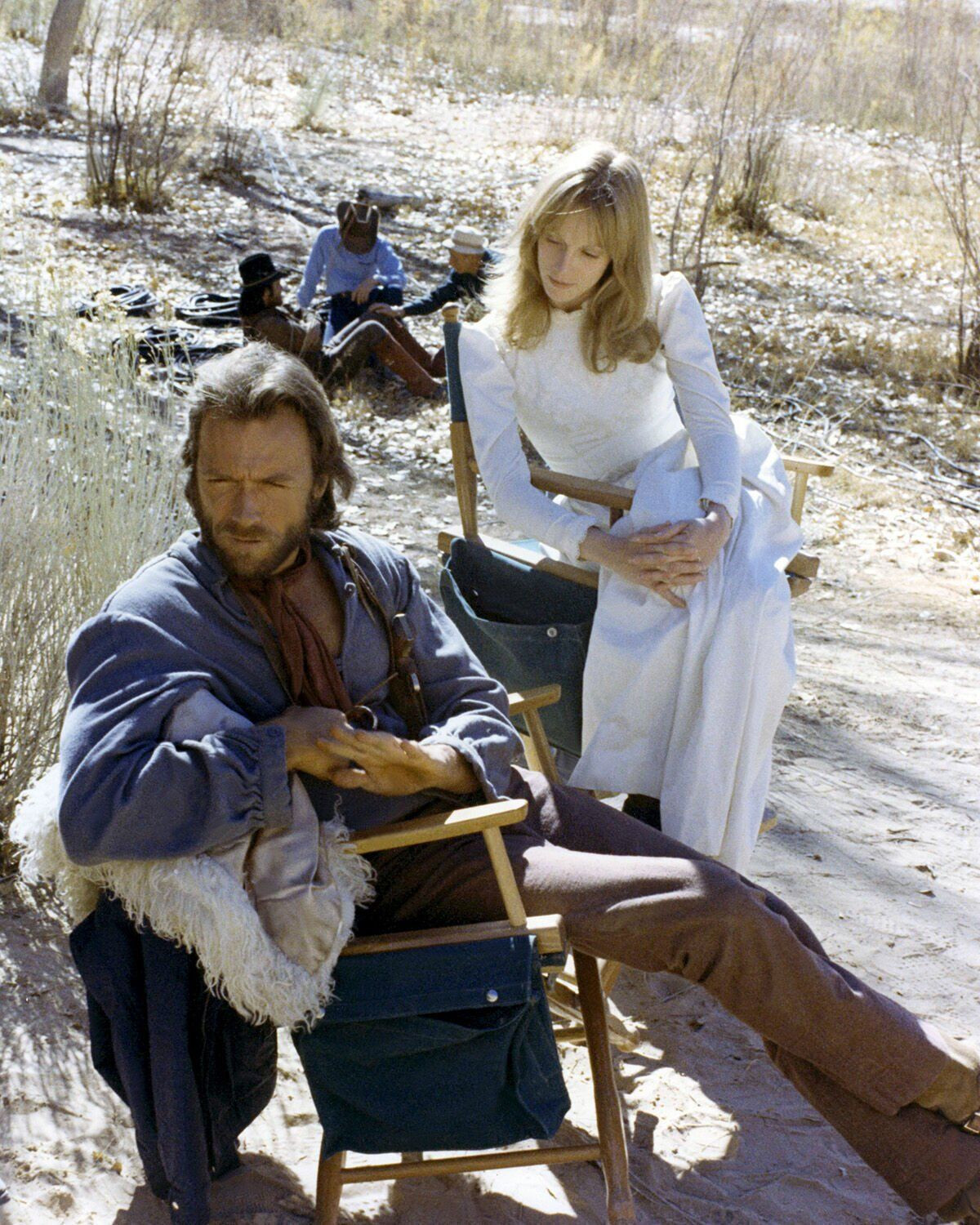
Eastwood with Sondra Locke on the set of The Outlaw Josey Wales (1975)

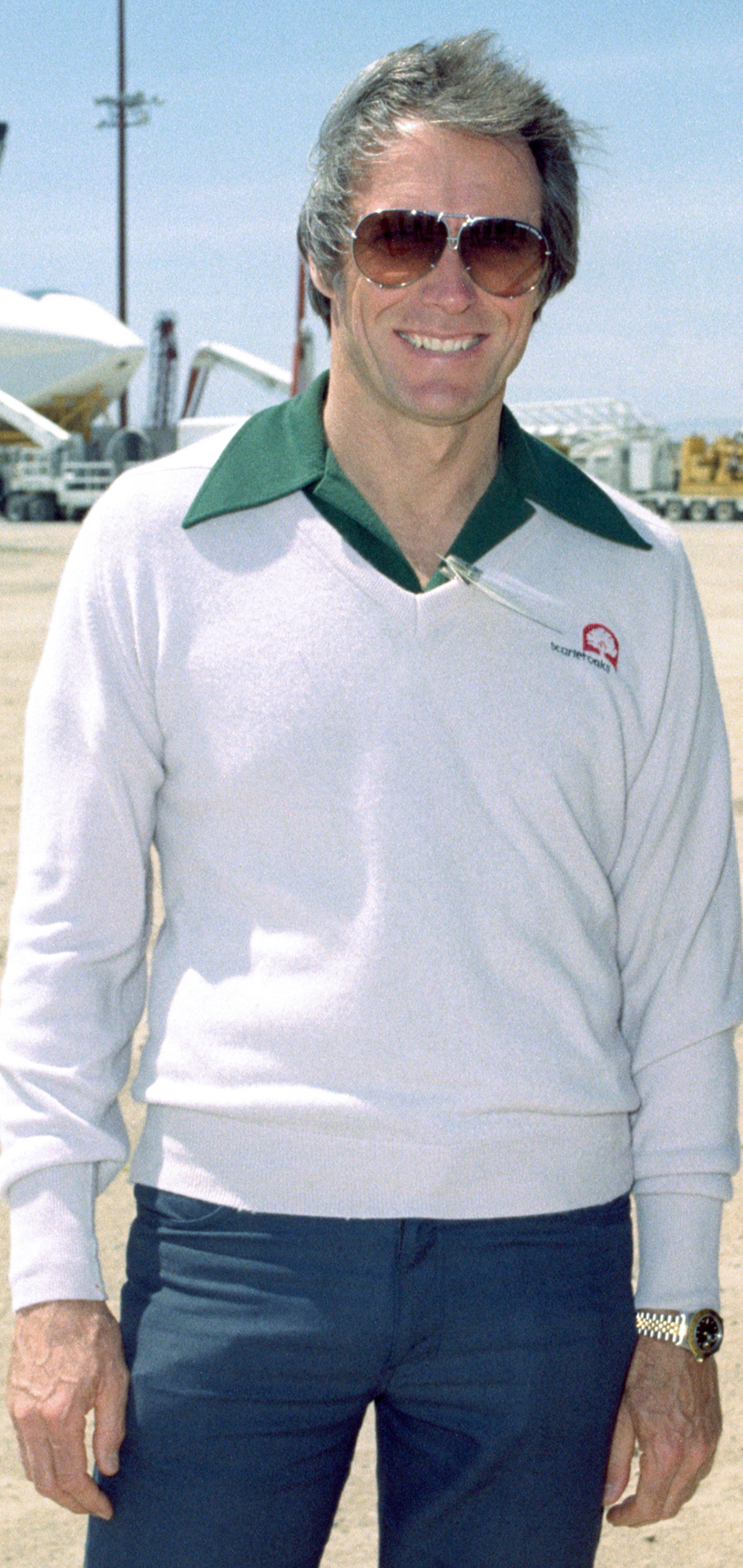
Eastwood near the Space Shuttle Columbia shortly after it had completed its first orbital flight (1981)

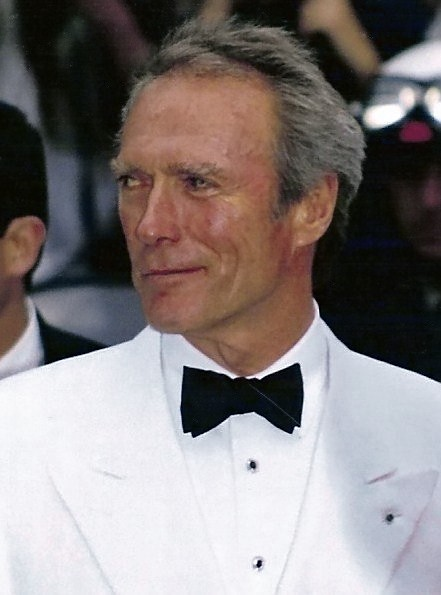
Eastwood at the 46th Cannes Film Festival (1993)

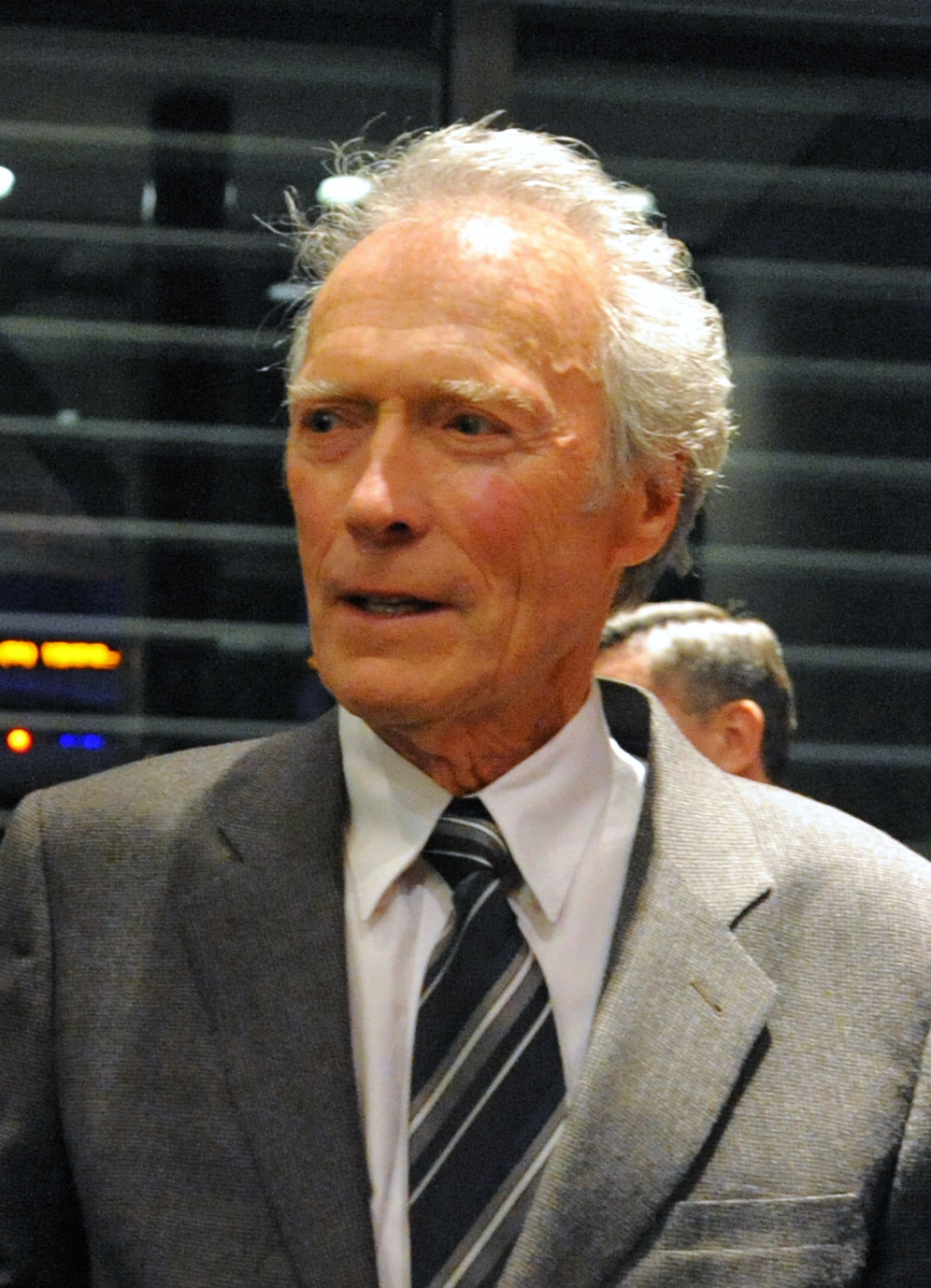
Eastwood at the premiere for J. Edgar in Washington, D.C. (2011)

=== Acting roles ===
Year	Title	Role	Notes	Ref(s)
1955	Revenge of the Creature	Lab technician Jennings	Uncredited	
1955	Francis in the Navy	Jonesy		
1955	Lady Godiva of Coventry	First Saxon	Uncredited	
1955	Tarantula	Jet squadron leader	Uncredited	
1956	Never Say Goodbye	Will	Uncredited	
1956	Star in the Dust	Tom	Uncredited	
1956	Away All Boats	Navy medic	Uncredited	
1956	The First Traveling Saleslady	Lieutenant Jack Rice		
1957	Escapade in Japan	Dumbo pilot	Uncredited	
1958	Lafayette Escadrille	George Moseley		
1958	Ambush at Cimarron Pass	Keith Williams		
1964	A Fistful of Dollars	Joe	See also: Man with No Name	
1965	For a Few Dollars More	Manco	See also: Man with No Name	
1966	The Good, the Bad and the Ugly	Blondie	See also: Man with No Name	
1967	The Witches	Carlo (Note: The character was renamed "Charlie" in the film's English dub.)	Segment: "An Evening Like the Others"	
1968	Hang 'Em High	Jed Cooper		
1968	Coogan's Bluff	Walt Coogan		
1968	Where Eagles Dare	Lieutenant Schaffer		
1969	Paint Your Wagon	Pardner		
1970	Two Mules for Sister Sara	Hogan		
1970	Kelly's Heroes	Private Kelly		
1971	The Beguiled	John McBurney		
1971	Play Misty for Me	David Garver		
1971	Dirty Harry	Harry Callahan		
1972	Joe Kidd	Joe Kidd		
1973	High Plains Drifter	The Stranger		
1973	Breezy	Man in Crowd on Pier	Uncredited cameo	
1973	Magnum Force	Harry Callahan		
1974	Thunderbolt and Lightfoot	John 'Thunderbolt' Doherty		
1975	The Eiger Sanction	Jonathan Hemlock		
1976	The Outlaw Josey Wales	Josey Wales		
1976	The Enforcer	Harry Callahan		
1977	The Gauntlet	Ben Shockley		
1978	Every Which Way but Loose	Philo Beddoe		
1979	Escape from Alcatraz	Frank Morris		
1980	Bronco Billy	Bronco Billy McCoy		
1980	Any Which Way You Can	Philo Beddoe		
1982	Firefox	Mitchell Gant		
1982	Honkytonk Man	Red Stovall		
1983	Sudden Impact	Harry Callahan		
1984	Tightrope	Wes Block		
1984	City Heat	Lieutenant Speer		
1985	Pale Rider	Preacher		
1986	Heartbreak Ridge	Gunnery Sergeant Thomas 'Gunny' Highway		
1988	The Dead Pool	Harry Callahan		
1989	Pink Cadillac	Tommy Nowak		
1989	Gary Cooper: American Life, American Legend	Host	Documentary film	
1990	White Hunter Black Heart	John Wilson		
1990	The Rookie	Detective Nick Pulovski		
1992	Unforgiven	William 'Will' Munny		
1993	In the Line of Fire	Secret Service Agent Frank Horrigan		
1993	A Perfect World	Texas Ranger Red Garnett		
1995	Casper	Himself	Uncredited cameo	
1995	The Bridges of Madison County	Robert Kincaid		
1997	Absolute Power	Luther Whitney		
1999	True Crime	Steve Everett		
2000	Space Cowboys	Frank Corvin		
2002	Blood Work	Terry McCaleb		
2004	Million Dollar Baby	Frankie Dunn		
2008	Gran Torino	Walt Kowalski		
2011	Kurosawa's Way	Himself	Documentary film	
2012	Trouble with the Curve	Gus Lobel		
2012	Casting By	Himself	Documentary film	
2014	American Sniper	Church goer	Uncredited cameo	
2017	Sad Hill Unearthed	Himself	Documentary film	
2018	The Mule	Earl Stone		
2021	Cry Macho	Mike Milo		

=== Directing and producing credits ===
Year	Title	Director	Producer	Ref(s)
1971	Play Misty for Me	Yes	No	
1973	High Plains Drifter	Yes	No	
1973	Breezy	Yes	Yes	
1975	The Eiger Sanction	Yes	No	
1976	The Outlaw Josey Wales	Yes	No	
1977	The Gauntlet	Yes	No	
1980	Bronco Billy	Yes	No	
1982	Firefox	Yes	Yes	
1982	Honkytonk Man	Yes	Yes	
1983	Sudden Impact	Yes	Yes	
1984	Tightrope	No	Yes	
1985	Pale Rider	Yes	Yes	
1986	Heartbreak Ridge	Yes	Yes	
1988	Bird	Yes	Yes	
1990	White Hunter Black Heart	Yes	Yes	
1990	The Rookie	Yes	No	
1992	Unforgiven	Yes	Yes	
1993	A Perfect World	Yes	No	
1995	The Bridges of Madison County	Yes	Yes	
1995	The Stars Fell on Henrietta	No	Yes	
1997	Absolute Power	Yes	Yes	
1997	Midnight in the Garden of Good and Evil	Yes	Yes	
1999	True Crime	Yes	Yes	
2000	Space Cowboys	Yes	Yes	
2002	Blood Work	Yes	Yes	
2003	Mystic River	Yes	Yes	
2004	Million Dollar Baby	Yes	Yes	
2006	Flags of Our Fathers	Yes	Yes	
2006	Letters from Iwo Jima	Yes	Yes	
2008	Changeling	Yes	Yes	
2008	Gran Torino	Yes	Yes	
2009	Invictus	Yes	Yes	
2010	Hereafter	Yes	Yes	
2011	J. Edgar	Yes	Yes	
2012	Trouble with the Curve	No	Yes	
2014	Jersey Boys	Yes	Yes	
2014	American Sniper	Yes	Yes	
2016	Sully	Yes	Yes	
2018	The 15:17 to Paris	Yes	Yes	
2018	The Mule	Yes	Yes	
2019	Richard Jewell	Yes	Yes	
2021	Cry Macho	Yes	Yes	
2024	Juror #2	Yes	Yes	

Executive producer

Year	Title	Ref(s)
1988	Thelonious Monk: Straight, No Chaser	
2005	Budd Boetticher: A Man Can Do (Note: An alternate and shorter version of the film was released under the title Budd Boetticher: An American Original.)	
2010	Dave Brubeck: In His Own Sweet Way	
2017	Indian Horse	

=== Score credits ===
Year	Title	Notes	Ref(s)
2003	Mystic River		
2004	Million Dollar Baby		
2006	Flags of Our Fathers	Kyle Eastwood and Michael Stevens also composed alongside Eastwood, but were not credited	
2007	Grace Is Gone		
2008	Changeling		
2010	Hereafter		
2011	J. Edgar		

=== Song credits ===
Year	Title	Singer	Composer	Lyricist	Song title(s)	Ref(s)
1969	Paint Your Wagon	Yes	No	No	"I Still See Elisa", "I Talk to the Trees", "Gold Fever" and "Best Things" (Note: Eastwood sang "Best Things" with Lee Marvin and Ray Walston.)	
1980	Bronco Billy	Yes	No	No	"Bar Room Buddies" (Note: With Merle Haggard.)	
1980	Any Which Way You Can	Yes	No	No	"Beers to You" (Note: With Ray Charles.)	
1982	Honkytonk Man	Yes	No	No	"When I Sing About You", "No Sweeter Cheater Than You" and "In the Jailhouse Now" (Note: Eastwood sang "In the Jailhouse Now" with John Anderson, David Frizzell, and Marty Robbins.)	
1984	City Heat	Yes	No	No	"Montage Blues" (Note: With Michael Lang and Pete Jolly.)	
1986	Heartbreak Ridge	No	No	Yes	"How Much I Care" (Note: Co-written with Sammy Cahn.)	
1992	Unforgiven	No	Yes	No	"Claudia's Theme"	
1993	A Perfect World	No	Yes	No	"Big Fran's Baby"	
1995	The Bridges of Madison County	No	Yes	No	"Doe Eyes"	
1997	Absolute Power	No	Yes	No	"Power Waltz" and "Kate's Theme"	
1999	True Crime	No	No	Yes	"Why Should I Care" (Note: Co-written with Carole Bayer Sager and Linda Thompson.)	
2006	Flags of Our Fathers	No	No	Yes	"The Photograph", "Wounded Marines", "Armada Arrives", "Goodbye Ira", "Inland Battle", "Flag Raising", "The Medals", "Platoon Swims", "Flags Theme", "End Titles Guitar" and "End Titles"	
2007	Grace Is Gone	No	No	Yes	"Grace Is Gone"	
2008	Gran Torino	Uncredited	No	Yes	"Gran Torino" (Note: Credited for writing but uncredited for singing.)	

== Television ==
=== Actor ===
In the early stages of his acting career, Eastwood played several small roles in episodes for several television shows. This list includes appearances in various episodes of fictional shows, and excludes appearances as himself on talk shows, interview shows, ceremonies, and other related media.

Year	Title	Role	Notes	Ref(s)
1955	Allen in Movieland	Orderly	Television film	
1955	Highway Patrol	Joe Keeley	Episode "Motorcycle A"	
1956	Death Valley Days	John Lucas	2 episodes	
1956	TV Reader's Digest	Lieutenant Wilson	Episode "Cochise, Greatest of the Apaches"	
1957	The West Point Story	Cadet Bob Salter	Episode "White Fury"	
1958	Navy Log	Burns	Episode "The Lonely Watch"	
1959	Maverick	Red Hardigan	Episode "Duel at Sundown"	
1959	Alfred Hitchcock Presents	Newsman	Uncredited; episode "Human Interest Story"	
1959–1965	Rawhide	Rowdy Yates	Main role 217 episodes	
1962	Mister Ed	Himself	Episode "Clint Eastwood Meets Mister Ed"	
1991	Here's Looking at You, Warner Bros.	Host / Narrator	Documentary film	

=== Director ===
Year	Title	Notes	Ref(s)
1985	Amazing Stories	Episode "Vanessa in the Garden"	
2003	The Blues	Episode "Piano Blues"	

=== Executive producer ===
- Johnny Mercer: The Dream's on Me (2009)

== See also ==
- List of awards and nominations received by Clint Eastwood
- Clint Eastwood bibliography
- Clint Eastwood discography

== Bibliography ==
- "Classic Filmmaking". American Cowboy. Vol. 12, no. 4. Active Interest Media. November–December 2005. p. 12. ISSN 1079-3690. Archived from the original on December 24, 2020.
- Hughes, Howard (2009). Aim for the Heart: The Films of Clint Eastwood. Bloomsbury. ISBN 9780857710215. Archived from the original on December 5, 2020.
- Kapsis, Robert E.; Kathie Coblentz, eds. (1999). Clint Eastwood: Interviews. Translated by Kathie Coblentz. Jackson, MI: Univ. Press of Mississippi. ISBN 9781578060702. OCLC 40251476. Archived from the original on December 6, 2020.
- Levy, Shawn (2025). Clint: The Man and the Movies. HarperCollins. ISBN 9780063251021.
- Mara, Wil (2014). Fletcher Doyle (ed.). Clint Eastwood. New York: Cavendish Square Publishing. ISBN 9781627129503. OCLC 875257958. Archived from the original on December 6, 2020.
- Talarek, Michał (July 21, 2012). Clint Eastwood. Zycie Po Obu Stronach Kamery [Clint Eastwood: Life on Both Sides of the Camera] (in Polish). Warsaw: Michał Talarek. ISBN 9781466244313. Archived from the original on December 24, 2020.
