= N. Richard Nash =

American writer and dramatist (1913–2000)

- Born: Nathan Richard Nusbaum; June 8, 1913; Philadelphia, Pennsylvania, U.S.
- Died: December 11, 2000 (aged 87); Manhattan, New York, U.S.
- Occupations: Writer, dramatist
- Spouses: Helena Taylor (m. 1935; div. 1954) Janice Rule (m. 1955; div. 1955) Katherine Copeland (m. 1956)
- Children: 3
- Writing career
- Language: English
- Genres: Fiction, theatre

Nathan Richard Nusbaum (June 8, 1913 – December 11, 2000), known as N. Richard Nash, was an American writer and dramatist best known for writing Broadway shows, including The Rainmaker.

== Early life ==
Nash was born Nathan Richard Nusbaum in Philadelphia, Pennsylvania the only son and youngest child of S. L. Nusbaum, a bookbinder, and his wife Jenny (née Singer). He worked as a ten dollar per match boxer and graduated from South Philadelphia High School in 1930 before entering the University of Pennsylvania to study English and philosophy.

== Career ==
Nash published two books on philosophy, The Athenian Spirit and The Wounds of Sparta. Nash wrote his first play, Parting at Imsdorf, in 1940, which won the Maxwell Anderson Verse Drama Award. He next penned the Shakespearian-themed comedy The Second Best Bed, produced on Broadway in 1946. The highly acclaimed drama led to him writing more shows, including The Young and Fair (1948), See the Jaguar (1952, for which he won the International Drama Award in Cannes and the Prague Award), and The Rainmaker (1954, starring Geraldine Page; revived on Broadway in 1999). The Rainmaker, a full-length play, had originally been a The Philco Television Playhouse one-act 1953 television production. It was translated to over 40 languages and made into a 1956 Hollywood film starring Burt Lancaster and Katharine Hepburn, and a 1982 full-length TV production. The play was made into a Broadway musical, 110 in the Shade. Here Come the Brides (1968–1970, 52 episodes) was a Screen Gems television series developed by Nash; Nash wrote the series pilot of the same name.

In the 1950s, Nash moved from New York to Hollywood to write the screenplay for The Rainmaker. However, it was the 1972 Broadway failure of Echoes (1972) and the novelization of a screenplay that led Nash to transition from writing screenplays to writing novels. After working on Echoes, he developed a screenplay entitled Macho that he could not sell. In overcoming this, Nash noted:

It occurred to me to do a quick novelization. I got a $10,000 advance [$65,300 today] and completed it as Cry Macho in two weeks. It got surprisingly good reviews and the instant they appeared, three studios, all of which had rejected the screenplay, started to bid for this awful, little thing. I sold the rights to one. When they asked me to do the screenplay, I gave them what they had rejected — didn't change a word — and they loved it!

Nash's novel Cry Macho was published in June 1975 by Delacorte Press. Over the decades, there have multiple attempts to produce a movie of Cry Macho, including a feature starring Roy Scheider, which began initial production in Mexico in 1991, and one from Arnold Schwarzenegger, who originally planned to return to acting in 2011, after his time as Governor of California, with a film based on the Cry Macho novel that was eventually cancelled. The latest, and only successful, attempt to bring the story into the big screen, was announced in October 2020. The film, which was directed and produced by Clint Eastwood, was released in 2021 by Warner Bros. Pictures and HBO Max.

After selling Cry Macho, Nash began to write what he called "real novels" and discover that writing a novel was more flexible than writing a play and received much less criticism than writing a play. Nash wrote a number of screenplays, novels and more plays, including the screenplays for the 1947 Ann Sheridan film noir vehicle, Nora Prentiss, The Sainted Sisters (1948), Dear Wife (1949), Mara Maru (1952), Helen of Troy (1956), Porgy and Bess (1959), and later One Summer Love (1976) and Between the Darkness and the Dawn (1985). Other Broadway shows include Girls of Summer (1956), Handful of Fire (1958), Wildcat (1960, starring Lucille Ball), 110 in the Shade (1963; revived in 2007), The Happy Time (1968, nominated for the Tony Award for Best Musical), and Saravá (1979). Nash's novels include East Wind, Rain, Radiance, The Last Magic, and an unpublished novel, The Wildwood. Under the pseudonym of John Roc, he wrote a play, Fire!, and a novel, Winter Blood.

== Personal life ==
In 1935, Nash married Helena Taylor, with whom he had one son, Christopher. They divorced in 1954. Nash was married to Janice Rule in 1955, but they divorced later that same year. Later that year, he married Katherine Copeland, aka Katherine Kaplan, with whom he had two daughters, Jennifer and Amanda.

== Death ==
Nash died in Manhattan on December 11, 2000, aged 87.

== Work ==
=== Nonfiction ===
- The Wounds of Sparta
- The Athenian Spirit

=== Drama ===
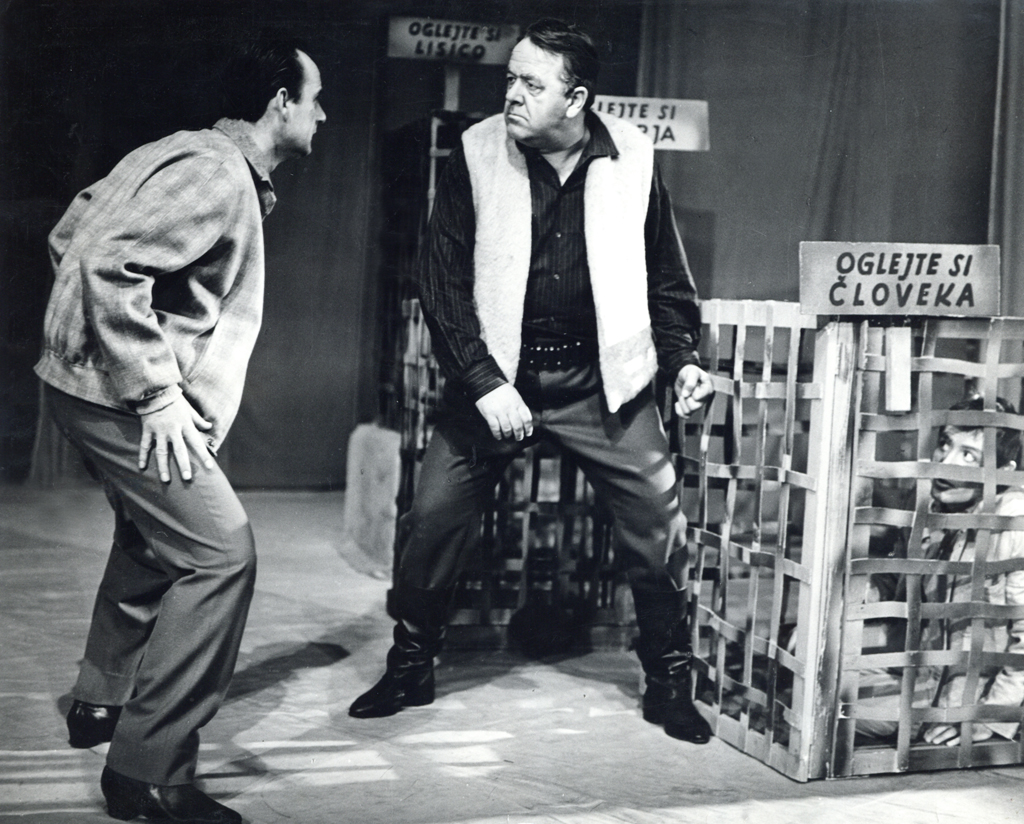
See the Jaguar by the Maribor Slovene National Theatre in 1964

- The Second Best Bed (1946)
- See the Jaguar (1952)
- The Rainmaker (1954)
- Handful of Fire (1958)

=== Screenplays ===
- The Sainted Sisters (1948)
- The Vicious Years (1950)
- The Joker (1954)
- Top of the World (1955)
- Porgy and Bess (1959)
- Saravá
- Wildcat
- Between the Darkness and the Dawn (1985)
- The Touch
- Echoes
- Girls of Summer
- The Young and Fair

=== Novels ===
- Cry Macho (1975)
- East, Wind Rain
- The Last Magic
- Winter Blood
- Radiance
- Aphrodite's Cave
- Behold the Man
- The Wildwood (2000)

=== Poetry ===
- Absalom
