= Saravá (musical) =

1979 musical

- Music: Mitch Leigh
- Lyrics: N. Richard Nash
- Book: N. Richard Nash
- Productions: 1978 Chicago try-out 1979 Broadway

Saravá is a musical with a book and lyrics by N. Richard Nash and music by Mitch Leigh. The musical was based on the book Dona Flor and Her Two Husbands by Brazilian writer Jorge Amado, published in 1966.

== Synopsis ==
Set in Salvador, Bahia, the musical starts with the sudden death of Dona Flor's husband, Vadinho, who collapses in the midst of Carnival celebrations. After a period of mourning, Dona Flor attracts another admirer, a local pharmacist, Teodoro. While her new husband lacks the passionate sensuality of Vadinho, he compensates by providing a life free of worry. But, on the first anniversary of her marriage, Vadinho returns. He is now a ghost, but has lost none of his old ways.

== History ==
The musical started its try-out period at the Colonial Theatre in Boston, Massachusetts. It ran from December 25th 1978 to January 6th 1979, being cut short by a week due to poor reviews and low tickets sales. The Broadway production opened at the Mark Hellinger Theatre on January 11, 1979, and moved to Broadway Theatre on March 1, 1979, where it closed after 101 performances and 38 previews. It ran for a total of 177 performances.

== Original cast and characters ==
Character	Broadway (1979)
Dona Flor	Tovah Feldshuh
Vadinho	P.J. Benjamin
Teo	Michael Ingram
Dona Paiva	Betty Walker
Rosalia	Randy Graff
Dionisia	Carol Jean Lewis
Arigof	Reginald Cannon-Jackson
Antonio	Alan Abrams
Costas	Doncharles Manning

== Song list ==
Act I

- "Saravá" - Vadinho, Flor and Others
- "Makulelé" - Manuel, Costas, Vadinho and Arigof
- "Vadhino Is Gone" - Flor
- "Hosanna" - Flor and Others
- "Nothing's Missing" - Teo and Flor
- "Nothing's Missing" (Reprise) - Flor
- "I'm Looking for a Man" - Dionisia and Others
- "A Simple Man" - Teo
- "Viva a Vida" - All

Act II

- "Muito Bom" - Flor, Teo and Others
- "Nothing's Missing" (Reprise) - Flor and Teo
- "Play the Queen" - Flor, Vadinho, Arigof and Others
- "Which Way Do I Go?" - Flor
- "Remember" - Vadinho
- "A Simple Man" (Reprise) - Teo
- "You Do" - Dionisia and Others
- "A Single Life" - Vadinho
- "Vadinho Is Gone" (Reprise) - Flor
- "Saravá" (Reprise) - Company

== Reception ==
The production received generally mixed reviews with the Daily News calling it "polished" but "without inner energy" and The Journal News saying the "exotic" performance of actress Tovah Feldshuh kept the musical running "longer than it deserved."

== Awards and honors ==
=== Original Broadway production ===
Year	Award	Category	Nominee	Result
1979	Tony Award	Best Performance by a Leading Actress in a Musical	Tovah Feldshuh	Nominated
