= Handful of Fire =

1958 play by N. Richard Nash

Handful of Fire is a 1958 play in two acts by American playwright N. Richard Nash. The play opened on Broadway at the Martin Beck Theatre on October 1, 1958, closing after five performances on October 4, 1958.
