= Cry Macho (soundtrack) =

Cry Macho (Original Motion Picture Soundtrack)

Film score by Mark Mancina
- Released: September 10, 2021
- Recorded: 2020–2021
- Studios: Red Horse Ranch Studios, Austin, Texas
- Genre: Film score
- Length: 37:13
- Label: WaterTower Music
- Producer: Mark Mancina

Mark Mancina chronology
Moana (2016)	Cry Macho (2021)	The Sea Beast (2022)

Cry Macho (Original Motion Picture Soundtrack) is the film score composed by Mark Mancina to the 2021 film Cry Macho directed by Clint Eastwood, who starred in the lead role. The score was released under the WaterTower Music on September 10, 2021.

== Background ==
Mark Mancina composed the film score in his first collaboration with Eastwood. He recorded the score remotely during the COVID-19 pandemic with a small band at the Red Horse Ranch Studios in Austin, Texas. The soundtrack album was released under the WaterTower Music label on September 10, 2021, a week prior to the film's release. The album featured Mancina's score as well as an original song "Find a New Home" written by Mancina and performed by Will Banister, and another song "Time Lapse" performed by Eastwood himself.

== Reception ==
A. O. Scott of The New York Times called it a "pleasant score", while Owen Gleiberman of Variety and David Rooney of The Hollywood Reporter called it "moody" and "atmospheric". Justin Chang of Los Angeles Times described it as a " spare, twangy" score. Jon Winkler of The Young Folks wrote "Even the score from Mark Mancina (Moana) has a cool, Western twang to it as our heroes trudge their way out of Mexico." Dwight Brown of NNPA wrote "The musical score (Mark Mancina, Moana) fairs better and the few Mexican songs that are on the soundtrack are more evocative than any other element". Beth Webb of NME wrote "composer Mark Mancina’s rich score adds heft and gravitas". Edward Douglas of Below the Line wrote "The music by Mark Mancina is partially the noodly piano playing that Eastwood seems to espouse in his own scores, but as the film goes along, Mancia does start using the music better to enhance the emotions on and action screen, which often becomes necessary due to the weak performances."

== Track listing ==
No.	Title	Artist	Length
1.	"Find a New Home"	Will Banister	4:24
2.	"Time Lapse"		1:40
3.	"Tex Mex"		1:25
4.	"Go Home"		1:34
5.	"Finding Rafo / Fed"		1:10
6.	"Home Intrusion / Take Him Out / Dark Driving"		2:44
7.	"Where's My Wallet?"		1:20
8.	"Rafo's Story"		1:19
9.	"Time to Go"		1:51
10.	"Dressing Down"		1:37
11.	"Dressing Down" (Alternate Version)		1:25
12.	"Federales Looking In / Our Stolen Car"		1:01
13.	"Mike's Story"		1:18
14.	"Horseback Montage"		1:31
15.	"Marta Theme"		1:27
16.	"He Still Wants Me"		1:29
17.	"Long Montage"		1:28
18.	"Where Is He"		1:13
19.	"We Got to L T G"		1:25
20.	"So You Lied"		2:20
21.	"Car Crash"		1:02
22.	"He's Yours Now"		1:27
23.	"Time Lapse" (Clint Version)	Clint Eastwood	1:03
Total length:			37:13

== Personnel ==
Credits adapted from WaterTower Music:

- Music composer – Mark Mancina
- Additional music – Clint Eastwood, Marlon E. Espino
- Music producers – Mark Mancina, Marlon E. Espino
- Orchestration – Larry Rench
- Mixing – Kevin Harp
- Mastering – Gavin Lurssen, Reuben Cohen
- Score editor – Chris McGeary
- Music business affairs executive – Ray Gonzalez
- Executive in charge of WaterTower Music – Jason Linn
- Executives in charge Of music For Warner Bros. Pictures – Linda Christie, Niki Sherrod, Paul Broucek
- Production manager for WaterTower Music – Sandeep Sriram

Musicians

- Accordion – Jose Gonzales
- Bass – David Levita
- Cello – Marta Bagratuni
- Dobro – Greg Leisz, David Levita
- Drums – Victor Indrizzo
- Ethnic woodwinds – David Weiss
- Guitars – David Levita, Marlon E. Espino
- Harmonica – Ross Garren
- Mandolin – Marlon E. Espino
- Nylon guitar – Mark Mancina
- Pedal steel guitar – Greg Leisz
- Percussion – Mark Mancina, Victor Indrizzo
- Piano – Mark Mancina, Matt Rollings
- Synthesizer – Matt Rollings
- Violin – Edwin Huizinga
