= Cry Macho (film) =

2021 film directed by Clint Eastwood

- Official release poster
- Directed by: Clint Eastwood
- Screenplay by: Nick Schenk; N. Richard Nash
- Based on: Cry Macho by N. Richard Nash
- Produced by: Albert S. Ruddy; Tim Moore; Jessica Meier; Clint Eastwood
- Starring: Clint Eastwood; Dwight Yoakam
- Cinematography: Ben Davis
- Edited by: Joel Cox; David Cox
- Music by: Mark Mancina
- Production company: Malpaso Productions
- Distributed by: Warner Bros. Pictures
- Release date: September 17, 2021
- Running time: 104 minutes
- Country: United States
- Languages: English; Spanish
- Budget: $33 million
- Box office: $16.5 million

Cry Macho is a 2021 American neo-Western film directed, produced by and starring Clint Eastwood in his final acting role and written by Nick Schenk and N. Richard Nash, based on Nash's 1975 novel. Set in 1979, it stars Eastwood as a former rodeo star hired to reunite a young boy (Eduardo Minett) in Mexico with his father (Dwight Yoakam) in the United States. There were many attempts to adapt Nash's novel into a film over the years. Arnold Schwarzenegger came on board to star in 2011, but canceled after a scandal. In 2020, Eastwood's adaptation was announced, he produced the film with Albert S. Ruddy (in his final film before his death), Tim Moore, and Jessica Meier. It is Eastwood's final starring role before his retirement in 2026.

Cry Macho was filmed from November to December 2020 in the state of New Mexico; Ben Davis was the cinematographer, Mark Mancina was the composer, and Joel and David Cox were the editors. It was theatrically released in the United States on September 17, 2021, by Warner Bros. Pictures with a simultaneous 31-day release on the HBO Max streaming service. The film underperformed at the box-office, grossing $16 million against a $33 million budget. It received mixed reviews, with its cinematography and calm style of storytelling and score receiving praise while the screenplay was targeted for criticism, Eastwood's performance drew polarized responses.

== Plot ==
By 1979, Texan rodeo star Mike Milo has retired due to a severe back injury. The following year, his former boss Howard Polk, a ranch owner, hires him to travel to Mexico City and bring Howard's 15-year-old son, Rafo, to live with him. He agrees and upon reaching Mexico City, he meets the boy's mother, Leta, who runs several illicit businesses. She pretends to be agreeable as previous attempts by Howard to get the boy have failed, and tells him that Rafo has turned to a life of crime, and participates in cockfights with his rooster, Macho. Soon after, Mike finds Rafo participating in a cockfight that is interrupted by a police raid. After the police depart, Mike approaches Rafo and tells him that his father wants him to come and live with him. Although he has misgivings, Rafo, intrigued, agrees to go with Mike back to Texas and leaves to collect his things.

Mike then reports to Leta that he and Rafo are leaving, whereupon she becomes hostile, threatening him should he proceed further. After Mike leaves, Leta orders several of her henchmen to follow him. Mike then sets off back to Texas alone, but discovers that Rafo has snuck into his truck with Macho. When Rafo steals his wallet and shares his desire to spend time with his father, Mike agrees to take him after all. During the drive there, the pair share stories about their lives, including how Leta's henchmen used to abuse Rafo, and discuss the meaning of being "macho".

At a restaurant, Mike phones Howard and tells him that he has found Rafo. Outside of the restaurant, one of Leta's henchmen, Aurelio, tries to forcefully take Rafo and tells the locals that Mike has kidnapped him. Rafo yells out that Aurelio is a molester and they beat him up. After Mike and Rafo leave, Mike's truck is stolen by thieves. Walking to the next town Mike buys new clothes to fit in better and Rafo "borrows" an abandoned car to use. At a cantina, they meet the owner, Marta, who helps them evade police officers searching for them. They hit the road only to turn around after passing through one of the many police checkpoints along the highway. Returning to the town during a rain storm, they seek shelter in a shrine. Mike tells Rafo that he lost his wife and children in a car accident.

Recognizing the car, Marta finds them and brings them breakfast. Rafo discovers their car has a leak and Mike tells him they have to stay put for now. After coming across a ranch, Mike offers his services in helping break the wild horses, in the process teaching Rafo how to ride a horse and demonstrating his love for animals. The pair return to Marta's cafe and spend some time with her family. On a phone call with Mike, Howard expresses his concern that Mike has been in Mexico for two weeks, longer than expected. When Aurelio and police officers turn up asking for Mike and Rafo, the two sneak away, running into Marta and saying a brief goodbye. They find a new car and start their final drive to the border.

On the highway once again, Mike notices a patrol car following them and turns off suddenly to lose the tail. Mike reveals that Howard told him over the phone that he wants Rafo simply to battle Leta in court for her money. An angry Rafo tries to leave but the police pull up and search their vehicle. When they find nothing, the police officers leave and the pair continues their journey. Whilst driving, Mike tells Rafo that being "macho" is overrated and encourages him to make his own decisions in life. Rafo decides that he still wants to be with his father. Aurelio then finds them, runs them off the road, and holds them at gunpoint. However, Macho jumps at him enabling Mike to grab his gun. They then use Aurelio's car to make it to the border. As a final goodbye, Rafo gives Macho to Mike before reuniting with his father. Mike remains on the Mexican side of the border and returns to Marta.

== Cast ==
- Clint Eastwood as Mike Milo
- Eduardo Minett as Rafo
- Natalia Traven as Marta
- Dwight Yoakam as Howard Polk
- Fernanda Urrejola as Leta
- Horacio García-Rojas as Aurelio

== Production ==
=== Background ===
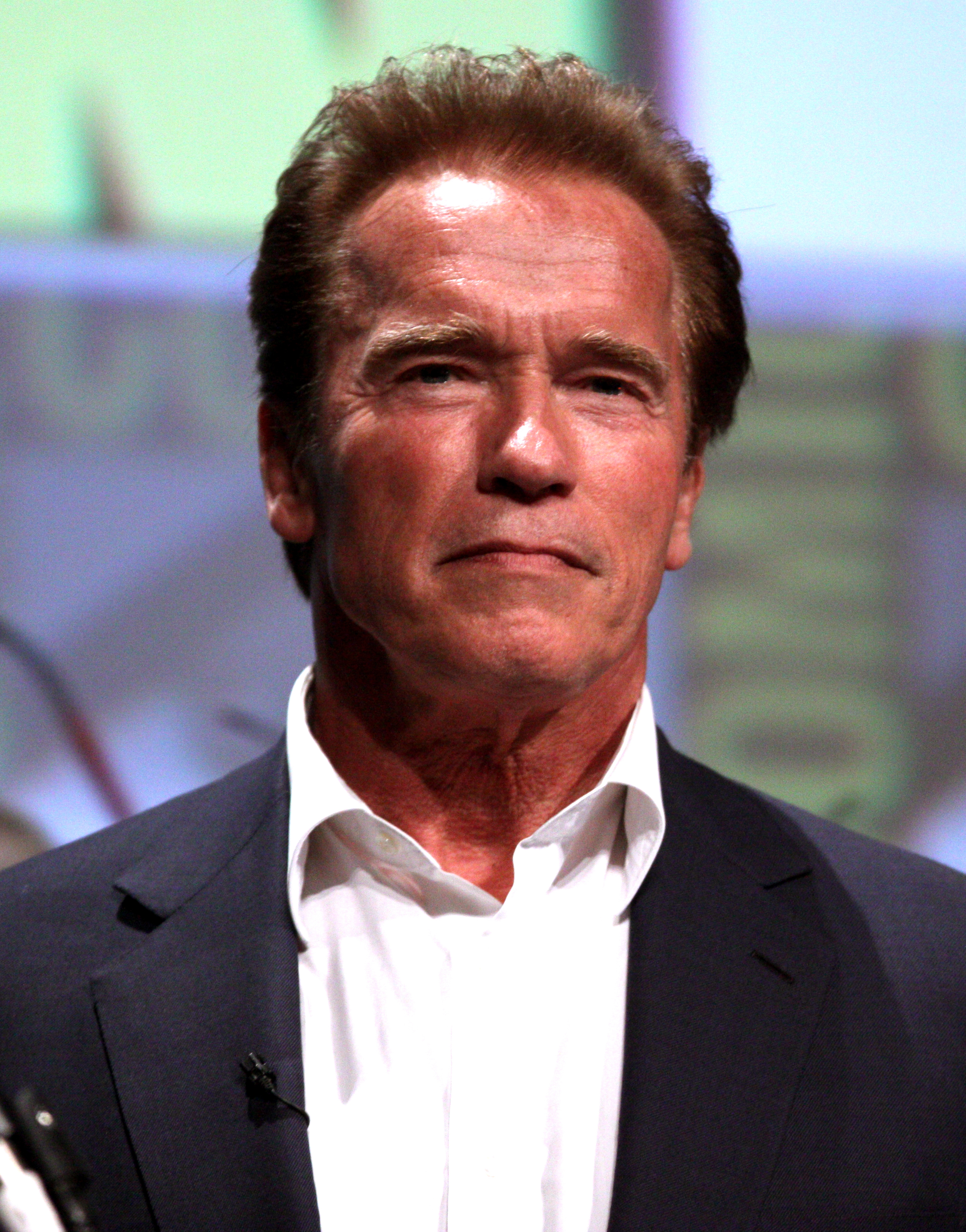
Arnold Schwarzenegger was originally cast in 2011

The novel Cry Macho, which the film adapts, was originally written as a screenplay by author N. Richard Nash. Sometime in the 1970s, 20th Century Fox received the script and rejected it twice. To compensate, he reworked the material, turned it into a novel, and had it published in 1975. It was so well received that Nash decided to pitch the screenplay again, without changing a word, and sold it to a studio.

In Hollywood, producer Albert S. Ruddy spent decades trying to adapt the novel into a movie. In 1988, Ruddy gave Clint Eastwood the opportunity to star; Eastwood declined the role and suggested Robert Mitchum. In 1991, an adaptation starring Roy Scheider started filming in Mexico, but was never completed.

Other actors on board to star at one point included Burt Lancaster and Pierce Brosnan. In 2003, Arnold Schwarzenegger was given the option of starring in either a Westworld remake or a Cry Macho adaptation. He chose the latter but put it on hold when he was elected governor of California. In 2011, he said his first movie after his time as governor would be Cry Macho, with Brad Furman at the helm and filming set to take place in New Mexico. However, the project, was canceled after Schwarzenegger's divorce with Maria Shriver, following the revelation that he had fathered a son a decade earlier with an employee in their household.

=== Development ===
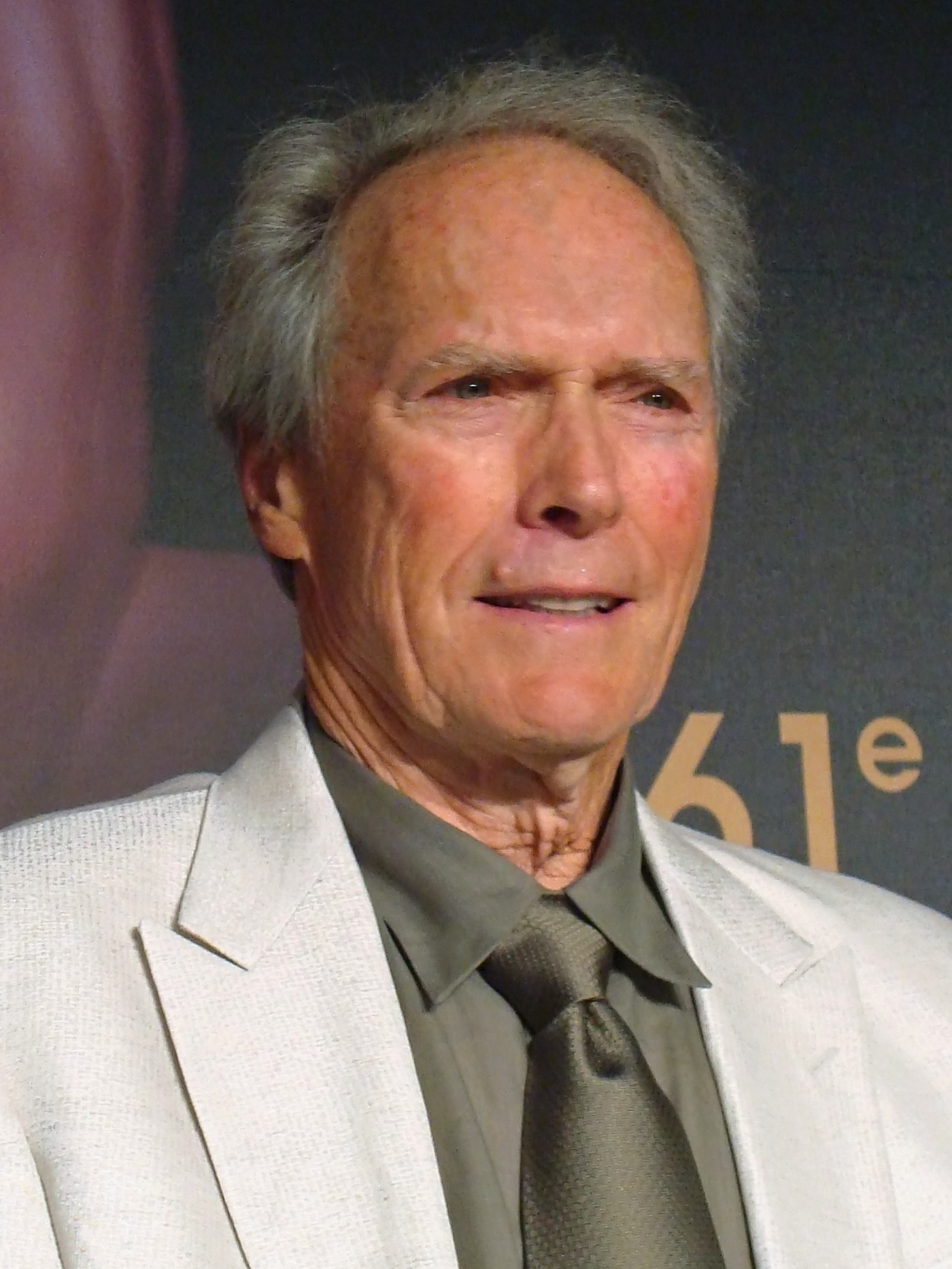
Director, producer, and actor Clint Eastwood

In October 2020, Warner Bros. Pictures announced Eastwood would produce, direct, and star in an adaptation of the novel. The screenplay included additional contributions by Nick Schenk, who previously worked with Eastwood on Gran Torino (2008) and The Mule (2018). Principal photography began on November 4, 2020 in Albuquerque, New Mexico with cinematographer Ben Davis. Filming moved to Socorro County on November 16 and concluded on November 30. In December, filming took place in Belen, New Mexico, with Montaño's Family Restaurant turned into a café for the shoot. Crew members had to follow safety protocols due to the COVID-19 pandemic, including social distancing and daily testing. The film was shot on a $33 million budget.

Filming concluded on December 15, 2020, a day ahead of schedule. The rest of the cast was revealed later that month. According to the New Mexico State Film Office, the production employed 250 crew, ten supporting cast members, and over 600 local background extras. Filming locations included the counties of Bernalillo, Sandoval, Sierra and Valencia. Eastwood recalled rehiring a young cast member who had received a false positive for the coronavirus. He mentioned the many difficulties of filming scenes with Macho, the rooster in the film, who was played by 11 birds. The film features Eastwood riding a horse, which he last did on film for Unforgiven in 1992; Eastwood said that the wrangler was "worried". When asked about acting at the age of 90 and rejecting the role in 1988, Eastwood said, "I always thought I'd go back and look at that. It was something I had to grow into. One day, I just felt it was time to revisit it. It's fun when something's your age, when you don't have to work at being older." During post-production, Joel and David Cox edited the film and Mark Mancina composed the score. The soundtrack album, released by WaterTower Music on September 10, 2021, features an original song, "Find a New Home" written by Mancina and performed by Will Banister.

Warner Bros. Discovery CEO David Zaslav criticized the studio's decision to finance the film. Warner executives allegedly said that although they knew the film was unlikely to turn a profit, they felt indebted to Eastwood for his decades-long relationship with the studio and his consistent ability to deliver films under budget and on time.

== Marketing ==
The marketing campaign for Cry Macho began on August 5, 2021, when two sets of "first look" images, a theatrical release poster, and a trailer were released. In a statement to Entertainment Weekly, Eastwood said the film was about a man who "starts his life over again." Based on the promotional material, Empire's James White said the film would be Eastwood's "latest examination of the changing face of machismo". William Hughes from The A.V. Club said the trailer expressed "more heartwarming elements—advice, definitions of masculinity, cockfighting—while focusing on the relationship between Eastwood and the kid he's maybe, kind of, sort of kidnapped."

In late August, representatives from Warner Bros. Pictures discussed how the studio would release its films in the future, said they had "found a way to make it work," and presented a pre-recorded hour-long reel showcasing their upcoming projects at CinemaCon, which included the trailer for Cry Macho and a special tribute piece for Eastwood. In September, several featurettes with a focus on Eastwood's career were released, featuring several clips from Cry Macho and Eastwood's filmography alongside recorded messages from producers Albert S. Ruddy and Tim Moore as well as Morgan Freeman, Mel Gibson, Gene Hackman, John Lee Hancock, George Lucas, Martin Scorsese, Steven Spielberg, Meryl Streep, and Hilary Swank. In their review of the footage, Eric Vespe from /Film said, "As far as the movie it is promoting is concerned, I can't say I'm more or less excited to see it, but as a film fan, I do appreciate that we're showing Clint Eastwood the love and appreciation he deserves while he's still with us. There is something about seeing Eastwood in a cowboy hat, sitting on a horse, that just feels right, you know? It's no wonder that so much real estate is dedicated to that aspect of his new movie in this clever bit of marketing." Yahoo! News wrote that "it [is] safe to say that Eastwood fans will feel all kinds of emotions when they see him back in the saddle." After the film was released, however, Forbes said Cry Macho was going to flop at the box office because "the marketing allure of 'See Clint Eastwood onscreen ... one last time' was going to wear off."

== Release ==
Cry Macho was theatrically released in the United States on September 17, 2021, by Warner Bros. Pictures with a simultaneous release on the HBO Max streaming service for 31 days. The film was originally set to premiere on October 22, but was pushed forward as a result of a release date shuffle with Dune and The Many Saints of Newark. The film opened the 2021 Tokyo International Film Festival on October 30, 2021. It was released on digital formats on November 5, 2021, with a physical release on Blu-ray and DVD in addition to a manufacture-on-demand 4K Blu-ray from the Studio Distribution Services on December 7, 2021.

== Reception ==
=== Audience viewership ===
According to Samba TV, which measures its results from a sample of three million households and only counts a view if the film was watched for at least 5 minutes, Cry Macho was streamed on HBO Max in 693,000 households in its first three days, tying with the viewership numbers of In the Heights. Online audiences were generally over the age of 65 and 35% Hispanic. By the end of its first month, the film had been watched in over 1.6 million households in the United States.

=== Box office ===
Cry Macho grossed $10.3 million in the United States and Canada, and $6.2 million in other territories, for a worldwide total of $16.5 million.

The film received a wide release in 3,967 theaters alongside Copshop on September 17, 2021. Box office analytics from Variety and TheWrap estimated that it would gross between $5–10 million in its opening weekend; Boxoffice Pro predicted a $1–5 million opening and $2–15 million total gross in the United States and Canada. TheWrap's Jeremy Fuster predicted older male demographics would most likely stream the film on HBO Max and would go see it in theaters only if it received positive word of mouth. In a statement to TheWrap, Comscore analyst Paul Dergarabedian said, "This is yet another test of the hybrid model with its own twist. While the theatrical model is generally better for bigger blockbusters, Cry Macho could get a serious boost from HBO Max given that the audience it is aiming for is still showing reluctance in showing up to theaters."

The film made $4.4 million in its opening weekend for a per theater average of $1,115, finishing third at the box office. Audiences were 79% over the age of 35, 51% female, and 66% Caucasian, 14% Latino, 8% Black, and 12% Asian or other. The analytics firm EntTelligence said older patrons saw the film in theaters early in the afternoon, with 88% of all audiences showing up before 8:00 pm. Additionally, early screenings cost an average of $10.77 per ticket, less than the $13 average for the limited releases of Blue Bayou and The Eyes of Tammy Faye. Variety describes the film's poor performance at the box office as being similar to recent releases from Warner Bros. Pictures during the COVID-19 pandemic such as Reminiscence and Malignant. In its second weekend, Cry Macho suffered a 53.8% decline and grossed $2.05 million in 4,022 theaters, placing fifth.

Worldwide, Cry Macho made an estimated $350,000 during its opening weekend in 585 theaters and $414,000 in its second weekend across 18 foreign markets. Two months after its original release, the film opened in the U.K. and Ireland on November 12, 2021. That same week, the film made $932,000 across 12 foreign markets. As of December 28, 2021, the film's largest markets were Spain ($835,056), Italy ($831,284), France ($810,000), Portugal ($119,096), Greece ($106,000), the U.K. ($96,742), Mexico ($95,000), Argentina ($82,000), Australia ($59,679), and the Netherlands ($33,366).

=== Critical response ===
On the review aggregator website Rotten Tomatoes, 57% of 178 critics' reviews are positive, with an average rating of 5.6/10. The website's consensus reads: "Cry Macho proves Clint Eastwood remains an economic filmmaker and charismatic screen presence – albeit one who's an awkward fit for this particular project." Metacritic, which uses a weighted average, assigned the film a score of 58 out of 100, based on 44 critics, indicating "mixed or average" reviews. Audiences polled by CinemaScore gave the film an average grade of "B" on an A+ to F scale, while PostTrak reported 73% of audience members gave it a positive score.

Several aspects of Cry Macho received a polarized response, including its tone, themes, and execution. Variety's Owen Gleiberman praised Eastwood's direction for keeping the story simple "in an inoffensive and good-natured way." Glenn Kenny, writing for RogerEbert.com, gave the film three and a half stars out of four, lauding it for its cinematography and second act, where "small events transpire in beautifully shot, unhurried scenes. The simple sincerity about what's worthwhile in life is the movie's reason for being. Nothing more and nothing less." From The New York Times, A. O. Scott found it to be a "hangout movie with nothing much to prove and just enough to say," gave positive feedback to the film's score and scenery, and wrote about Eastwood, "If the old man's driving, my advice is to get in and enjoy the ride."

Nick Schenk's screenplay received generally negative reviews and was called "weak" by CNN's Brian Lowry and G. Allen Johnson from the San Francisco Chronicle. In a mixed review, David Rooney from The Hollywood Reporter described it as "the kind of movie where, rather than let the audience observe the gradual development of a mutual understanding, we get Eastwood's Mike Milo spelling it out." From the Los Angeles Times, Justin Chang wrote that the film's themes tackling machismo were well-supported by the performances of the leads but said the story was repetitive and too similar to Gran Torino and The Mule. The Guardian's Benjamin Lee gave the film two stars out of five, writing that it consists of "scene after scene of nothing, not a funny line or a moving moment or an unresolved conflict, just nothing." The New Yorker's Richard Brody added that "the movie's heartening adventure gets its retrospective, tall-tale air from its implication of narrow, quasi-miraculous escapes, from the very suggestion of its implausibility."

Eastwood's role in the film also divided critics. Vulture's Bilge Ebiri said filmgoers would enjoy Eastwood's presence because of his filmography and added, "The picture doesn't always work, but it works when it has to. The same could be said for its star. Somehow, when we look at Mike, we don't see Eastwood the 91-year-old actor, but Clint the icon — not so much ageless as preserved in weathered glory, cinema's forever haunted cowboy." The Atlantic's David Sims praised Eastwood's charm and use of the film to reflect on his career, writing that the actor has "tended toward bluntness, casting a baleful eye over his career while telling a tale of a man who still has more to learn." Oliver Jones from The New York Observer disagreed and said Cry Macho would disappoint filmgoers, leaving them with "wistful memories of what once was."
