= The Rainmaker (play) =

American play by N. Richard Nash

- Playbill for the original Broadway production
- Original language: English
- Written by: N. Richard Nash
- Characters: Lizzie Curry; File; Bill Starbuck; H.C. Curry; Sheriff Thomas; Jim Curry; Noah Curry
- Setting: West rural town, Depression-era America

Premiere
- Date: October 28, 1954
- Place: Cort Theatre, Broadway

The Rainmaker is a play written by N. Richard Nash in the early 1950s. It was first performed in August 1953 on NBC's live TV show, The Philco Television Playhouse. The play then opened on Broadway on October 28, 1954, at the Cort Theatre, and ran for 125 performances. The Broadway production was directed by Joseph Anthony and produced by Ethel Linder Reiner.

The play was translated into more than 40 languages and adapted into the 1956 film The Rainmaker starring Burt Lancaster and Katharine Hepburn. It was filmed again for a 1982 TV movie directed by John Frankenheimer and starring Tommy Lee Jones and Tuesday Weld. The story was also adapted into a Broadway musical, 110 in the Shade. The play was revived on Broadway in 1999–2000 starring Woody Harrelson and Jayne Atkinson, who was nominated for the 2000 Tony Award for Best Actress in a Play.

== Plot summary ==
Set in a drought-ridden Western rural town in Depression-era America, the play tells the story of a pivotal hot summer day in the life of spinsterish Lizzie Curry. She keeps house for her father and two brothers on the family cattle ranch. She has just returned from a trip to visit pseudo-cousins (all male), which was undertaken with the failed expectation that she would find a husband. As their farm languishes under the devastating drought, Lizzie's family worries more about her marriage prospects than about their dying cattle. A charming confidence trickster named Starbuck arrives and promises to bring rain in exchange for $100. His arrival sets off a series of events that enable Lizzie to see herself in a new light.

== Critical reception ==
The reviews called the play "Stirring" (Newsday), "captivating" (The New York Times), "wonderfully funny" (New York Daily News), and a "classic" (Chicago Sun-Times).

== Original cast list ==
- Lizzie Curry – Geraldine Page
- File – Richard Coogan
- Bill Starbuck – Darren McGavin
- H.C. Curry – Cameron Prud'Homme
- Sheriff Thomas – Tom Flatley Reynolds
- Jim Curry – Albert Salmi
- Noah Curry – Joseph Sullivan

== In popular culture ==
In "Fonzie is a Thespian," episode 7 of the seventh season of Happy Days, The Rainmaker is presented by an unspecified community theatre in Milwaukee, Wisconsin, with Marion Cunningham as Lizzie and Fonzie as Bill Starbuck.

In Three Men and a Little Lady, Sylvia is learning lines from The Rainmaker (playing Lizzie), with Peter helping out by reading Starbuck's lines.

== Awards and nominations ==
=== 1999 Broadway revival ===
Year	Award	Category	Nominee	Result
2000	Tony Award	Best Actress in a Play	Jayne Atkinson	Nominated
