= List of awards and nominations received by Clint Eastwood =

Clint Eastwood awards and nominations
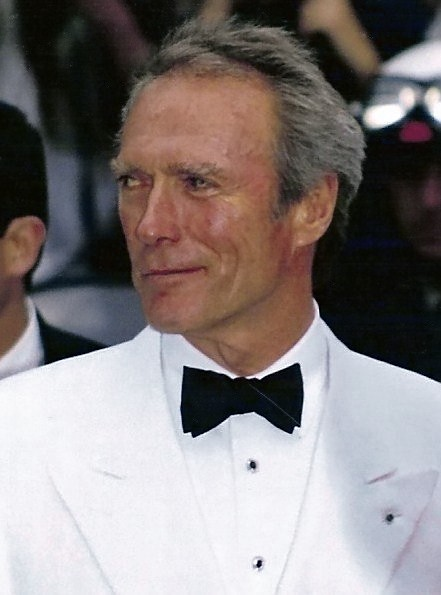
- Eastwood at the 1994 Cannes Film Festival
Awards and nominations
| Award | Wins | Nominations |
| Academy Awards | 4 | 11 |
| BAFTA Awards | 0 | 3 |
| Golden Globes | 4 | 13 |
| Grammy Awards | 0 | 1 |

Totals (Note: Certain award groups do not simply award one winner. They acknowledge several different recipients, have runners-up, and have third place. Since this is a specific recognition and is different from losing an award, runner-up mentions are considered wins in this award tally. For simplification and to avoid errors, each award in this list has been presumed to have had a prior nomination.)
- Wins: 74
- Nominations: 146

Clint Eastwood is an American film actor, director, producer and composer. He also has contributed music to his films, either through performing, writing, or composing. He has appeared mainly in: western, action, comedy and drama films. Over his career, he has received several accolades including four Academy Awards, four Golden Globe Awards, and two Directors Guild of America Awards, as well as nominations for: two BAFTA Awards, a Grammy Award, and Screen Actors Guild Award. He has been honored numerous prizes such as the AFI Life Achievement Award in 1996, the Honorary César in 1998, an Honorary Golden Lion in 2000, the Kennedy Center Honors in 2000, the Screen Actors Guild Life Achievement Award in 2003, the Stanley Kubrick Britannia Award in 2006, the Honorary Palme d'Or in 2008, and the National Medal of Arts in 2009.

After beginning his acting career primarily with small uncredited film roles and television appearances, his career has spanned more than 60 years in both television and film productions. Eastwood appeared in several television series, most notably appearing on Rawhide. His role in the eight-season series led to his leading roles in the spaghetti western trilogy A Fistful of Dollars (1964), For a Few Dollars More (1965) and The Good, the Bad and the Ugly (1966), which weren't released in the United States until 1967/68. Eastwood has played leading roles in 48 films, including the revisionist western Hang 'Em High (1968), the prison drama Escape from Alcatraz (1979), the romance drama The Bridges of Madison County (1995), and the drama Gran Torino (2008). Eastwood's started directing in 1971, and in 1982, his debut as a producer began with two films, the action thriller Firefox (1982) and the musical western Honkytonk Man (1982).

Eastwood directed the biographical musical drama Bird (1988) for which he was first nominated for the Golden Globe Award for Best Director. He gained acclaim for directing the revisionist Western Unforgiven (1992) for which he received the Academy Award for Best Picture and the Academy Award for Best Director as well as the Golden Globe Award for Best Director. For the neo-noir mystery thriller Mystic River (2003), he earned Academy Award nominations for Picture and Director and a Golden Globe Award nomination for Director. For the sports drama Million Dollar Baby (2004) he won Academy Awards for Best Picture and Best Director with a nomination for his first Academy Award for Best Actor. The film also earned him a win for the Golden Globe Award for Best Director as well as nomination for the Grammy Award for Best Score Soundtrack for Visual Media.

He directed the American World War II drama Flags of Our Fathers (2005), and the Japanese World War II drama Letters from Iwo Jima (2006), the later of which earned him Academy Award nominations for Best Picture and Best Director. He directed the mystery crime drama Changeling (2008) for which he was nominated for the BAFTA Award for Best Direction. He earned critical attention for directing and playing a grumpy widower and Korean War veteran in the drama Gran Torino (2008) for which he also served as the film's composer earning a nomination for the Golden Globe Award for Best Original Song. He directed the docudrama sports film Invictus (2009) earning a nomination for the Golden Globe Award for Best Director.

After an 8-year absence from the Academy Awards he returned with the biographical war drama American Sniper (2014) for which he was nominated as a producer for the Academy Award for Best Picture. For the film he also received the National Board of Review Award for Best Director as well as a nomination for the Directors Guild of America Award for Outstanding Directing – Feature Film.

== History ==
On August 21, 1984, Eastwood was honored at a ceremony at Grauman's Chinese Theatre to record his hand and footprints in cement. In May 1994, Eastwood was presented with France's medal of Comandeur de L' Ordre des Arts et des Lettres at the 1994 Cannes Film Festival. Jeanne Moreau commented, "Its remarkable that a man so important in European cinema has found the time to come here and spend twelve days watching movies with us". The jury included two people Eastwood knew well: Catherine Deneuve, with whom he had an affair back in the mid-1960s, and Lalo Schifrin, who had composed most of the jazz tracks to his Dirty Harry films. Eastwood received the AFI Life Achievement Award in 1996 and received an honorary degree from AFI in 2009. Eastwood is one of only two people to have been twice nominated for Best Actor and Best Director for the same film (Unforgiven and Million Dollar Baby) the other being Warren Beatty (Heaven Can Wait and Reds). Along with Beatty, Robert Redford, Richard Attenborough, Kevin Costner, and Mel Gibson, he is one of the few directors best known as an actor to win an Academy Award for directing. On February 27, 2005, at age 74, he became one of only three living directors (along with Miloš Forman and Francis Ford Coppola) to have directed two Best Picture winners. He is also, at age 74, the oldest recipient of the Academy Award for Best Director. Eastwood has also directed five actors in Academy Award–winning performances: Gene Hackman in Unforgiven, Tim Robbins and Sean Penn in Mystic River, and Morgan Freeman and Hilary Swank in Million Dollar Baby.

I will never win an Oscar and do you know why? First of all, because I'm not Jewish. Secondly, because I make too much money for those old farts in the Academy. Thirdly, and most importantly, because I don't give a fuck.

— Clint Eastwood during the 1970s, 14 Things You Never Knew About Clint Eastwood's 'Unforgiven'

Eastwood has received numerous other awards, including a Kennedy Center Honors in 2000. He received an honorary degree from University of the Pacific in 2006, and an honorary degree from University of Southern California in 2007. In 1995 he received the honorary Irving G. Thalberg Memorial Award for lifetime achievement in film producing. In 2006, he received a nomination for a Grammy Award in the category of Best Score Soundtrack Album For Motion Picture, Television or Other Visual Media for Million Dollar Baby. In 2007, Eastwood was the first recipient of the Jack Valenti Humanitarian Award, an annual award presented by the MPAA to individuals in the motion picture industry whose work has reached out positively and respectfully to the world. He received the award for his work on the 2006 films Flags of Our Fathers and Letters from Iwo Jima.

On December 6, 2006, California Governor Arnold Schwarzenegger and First Lady Maria Shriver inducted Eastwood into the California Hall of Fame located at The California Museum for History, Women, and the Arts. In early 2007, Eastwood was presented with the highest civilian distinction in France, Légion d'honneur, at a ceremony in Paris. French President Jacques Chirac told Eastwood that he embodied "the best of Hollywood". On November 13, 2009, Clint Eastwood was made French Legion of Honor Commander, which represents the third highest of five classes associated with this award.

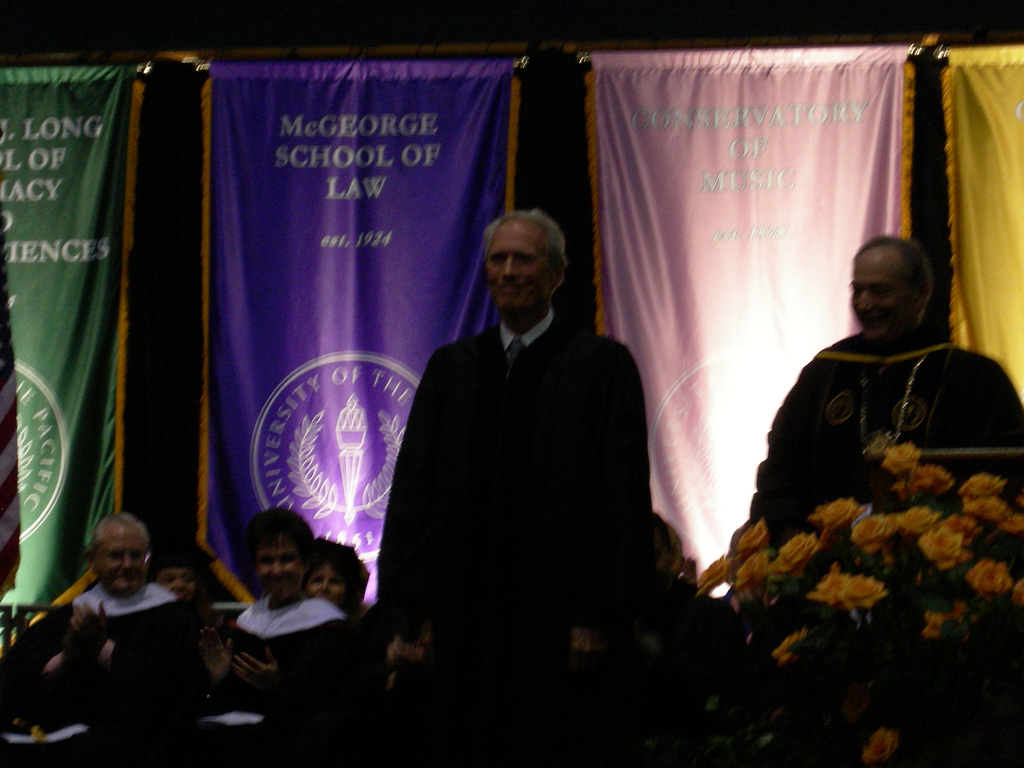
Eastwood receiving an honorary Doctor of Humane Letters from the University of Southern California in 2007

On May 27, 2007, Eastwood received an honorary Doctor of Humane Letters from the University of Southern California. On September 22, 2007, Eastwood was awarded an honorary Doctor of Music degree from the Berklee College of Music at the Monterey Jazz Festival, on which he serves as an active board member. Upon receiving the award he gave a speech, claiming, "It's one of the great honors I'll cherish in this lifetime." Eastwood received the 2008 Best Actor award from the National Board of Review of Motion Pictures for his performance in Gran Torino. On April 29, 2009, the Japanese government announced that Eastwood was to receive the Order of the Rising Sun, Gold Rays with Neck Ribbon, which represents the third highest of eight classes associated with this award.

In October 2009, he was honored by the Lumière Award (in honor of the Lumière Brothers, inventors of the Cinematography) during the first edition of the Lumière Film Festival in Lyon, France. This award honors his entire career and his major contribution to the 7th Art. In February 2010, Eastwood was recognized by President Barack Obama with an arts and humanities award. Obama called Eastwood's films "essays in individuality, hard truths and the essence of what it means to be American."

Eastwood does not have a star on the Hollywood Walk of Fame.

== Major associations ==
=== Academy Awards ===
| Year | Category | Nominated work | Result | Ref. |
|---|---|---|---|---|
| 1993 | Best Picture | Unforgiven | Won | |
| 1993 | Best Director | Unforgiven | Won | |
| 1993 | Best Actor | Unforgiven | Nominated | |
| 2004 | Best Picture | Mystic River | Nominated | |
| 2004 | Best Director | Mystic River | Nominated | |
| 2005 | Best Picture | Million Dollar Baby | Won | |
| 2005 | Best Director | Million Dollar Baby | Won | |
| 2005 | Best Actor | Million Dollar Baby | Nominated | |
| 2007 | Best Picture | Letters from Iwo Jima | Nominated | |
| 2007 | Best Director | Letters from Iwo Jima | Nominated | |
| 2015 | Best Picture | American Sniper | Nominated | |

=== BAFTA Awards ===
| Year | Category | Nominated work | Result | Ref. |
British Academy Film Awards
| 1993 | Best Film | Unforgiven | Nominated | |
| 1993 | Best Direction | Unforgiven | Nominated | |
| 2009 | Best Direction | Changeling | Nominated | |
BAFTA/LA Britannia Awards
| 2006 | Stanley Kubrick Excellence in Film Award | | Honored | |

=== Critics' Choice Awards ===
| Year | Category | Nominated work | Result | Ref. |
Critics' Choice Movie Awards
| 2004 | Best Composer | Mystic River | Nominated | |
| 2004 | Best Director | Mystic River | Nominated | |
| 2005 | Best Director | Million Dollar Baby | Nominated | |
| 2005 | Best Picture | Million Dollar Baby | Nominated | |
| 2007 | Best Director | Letters from Iwo Jima | Nominated | |
| 2008 | Best Composer | Grace Is Gone | Nominated | |
| 2009 | Best Actor | Gran Torino | Nominated | |
| 2009 | Best Composer | Changeling | Nominated | |

=== Golden Globe Awards ===
| Year | Category | Nominated work | Result | Ref. |
|---|---|---|---|---|
| 1971 | Henrietta Award | N/A | Won | |
| 1989 | Best Director – Motion Picture | Bird | Won | |
| 1993 | Best Director – Motion Picture | Unforgiven | Won | |
| 2004 | Best Director – Motion Picture | Mystic River | Nominated | |
| 2005 | Best Original Score – Motion Picture | Million Dollar Baby | Nominated | |
| 2005 | Best Director – Motion Picture | Million Dollar Baby | Won | |
| 2007 | Best Director – Motion Picture | Flags of Our Fathers | Nominated | |
| 2007 | Best Foreign Language Film | Letters from Iwo Jima | Won | |
| 2007 | Best Director – Motion Picture | Letters from Iwo Jima | Nominated | |
| 2008 | Best Original Score – Motion Picture | Grace Is Gone | Nominated | |
| 2008 | Best Original Song – Motion Picture | Grace Is Gone | Nominated | |
| 2009 | Best Original Song – Motion Picture | Changeling | Nominated | |
| 2009 | Best Original Song – Motion Picture | Gran Torino | Nominated | |
| 2010 | Best Director – Motion Picture | Invictus | Nominated | |

=== Grammy Awards ===
| Year | Category | Nominated work | Result | Ref. |
|---|---|---|---|---|
| 2006 | Best Score Soundtrack Album Visual Media | Million Dollar Baby | Nominated | |

=== Screen Actors Guild Awards ===
| Year | Category | Nominated work | Result | Ref. |
|---|---|---|---|---|
| 2003 | Life Achievement Award | | Honored | |
| 2005 | Outstanding Cast in a Motion Picture | Million Dollar Baby | Nominated | |

== Miscellaneous awards ==
| Organizations | Year | Category | Work | Result | Ref. |
|---|---|---|---|---|---|
| Amanda Awards | 2007 | Best Foreign Feature Film | Flags of Our Father | Nominated | |
| Australian Film Institute | 2004 | Best Foreign Film | Mystic River | Nominated | |
| Blockbuster Entertainment Awards | 2001 | Favorite Action Team | Space Cowboys | Nominated | |
| Blue Ribbon Awards | 1996 | Best Foreign Language Film | The Bridges of Madison County | Won | |
| Blue Ribbon Awards | 2004 | Best Foreign Language Film | Mystic River | Won | |
| Blue Ribbon Awards | 2005 | Best Foreign Language Film | Million Dollar Baby | Won | |
| Bodil Awards | 2004 | Best American Film | Mystic River | Nominated | |
| Bodil Awards | 2007 | Best American Film | Letters from Iwo Jima | Won | |
| Cannes Film Festival | 1985 | Palme d'Or | Pale Rider | Nominated | |
| Cannes Film Festival | 1988 | Palme d'Or | Bird | Nominated | |
| Cannes Film Festival | 1990 | Palme d'Or | White Hunter Black Heart | Nominated | |
| Cannes Film Festival | 2003 | Palme d'Or | Mystic River | Nominated | |
| Cannes Film Festival | 2003 | Golden Coach | Mystic River | Won | |
| Cannes Film Festival | 2008 | Palme d'Or | Changeling | Nominated | |
| Cannes Film Festival | 2009 | Honorary Palme d'Or | | Won | |
| César Awards | 1989 | Best Foreign Film | Bird | Nominated | |
| César Awards | 1996 | Best Foreign Film | The Bridges of Madison County | Nominated | |
| César Awards | 2004 | Best Foreign Film | Mystic River | Won | |
| César Awards | 2005 | Best Foreign Film | Million Dollar Baby | Won | |
| César Awards | 2009 | Best Foreign Film | Gran Torino | Won | |
| César Awards | 2010 | Best Foreign Film | Invictus | Nominated | |
| Cinema for Peace | 2007 | Most Valuable Film of the Year | Flags of our Fathers | Won | |
| Cinema for Peace | 2007 | Most Valuable Film of the Year | Letters from Iwo Jima | Won | |
| David di Donatello Awards | 2004 | Best Foreign Film | Mystic River | Nominated | |
| David di Donatello Awards | 2005 | Best Foreign Film | Million Dollar Baby | Won | |
| David di Donatello Awards | 2007 | Best Foreign Film | Letters from Iwo Jima | Nominated | |
| David di Donatello Awards | 2009 | Best Foreign Film | Gran Torino | Won | |
| Directors Guild of America Awards | 1993 | Outstanding Directorial Achievement in Motion Pictures | Unforgiven | Won | |
| Directors Guild of America Awards | 2004 | Outstanding Directorial Achievement in Motion Pictures | Mystic River | Nominated | |
| Directors Guild of America Awards | 2005 | Outstanding Directorial Achievement in Motion Pictures | Million Dollar Baby | Won | |
| Directors Guild of America Awards | 2015 | Outstanding Directorial Achievement in Motion Pictures | American Sniper | Nominated | |
| Directors Guild of Great Britain Awards | 2005 | Outstanding Directorial Achievement in International Film | Million Dollar Baby | Nominated | |
| European Film Awards | 2004 | European Film Award | Mystic River | Nominated | |
| Hochi Film Awards | 1993 | Best Foreign Language Film | Unforgiven | Won | |
| Hochi Film Awards | 2006 | Best Foreign Language Film | Flags of Our Fathers | Won | |
| Nastro d'Argento | 2005 | Best Director – Foreign Film | Million Dollar Baby | Won | |
| Japan Academy Prize | 1994 | Foreign Film | Unforgiven | Nominated | |
| Japan Academy Prize | 1996 | Foreign Film | Bridges of Madison County | Nominated | |
| Japan Academy Prize | 2004 | Foreign Film | Mystic River | Nominated | |
| Japan Academy Prize | 2006 | Foreign Film | Million Dollar Baby | Won | |
| Japan Academy Prize | 2007 | Foreign Film | Flags of Our Fathers | Won | |
| Japan Academy Prize | 2008 | Foreign Film | Letters from Iwo Jima | Won | |
| Japan Academy Prize | 2010 | Foreign Film | Gran Torino | Won | |
| Japan Academy Prize | 2011 | Foreign Film | Invictus | Nominated | |
| Japan Academy Prize | 2015 | Foreign Film | Jersey Boys | Nominated | |
| Japan Academy Prize | 2016 | Foreign Film | American Sniper | Won | |
| Kinema Junpo Awards | 1994 | Best Foreign Language Film | Unforgiven | Won | |
| Kinema Junpo Awards | 1996 | Best Foreign Language Film Director | The Bridges of Madison County | Won | |
| Kinema Junpo Awards | 2001 | Best Foreign Language Film | Space Cowboys | Won | |
| Kinema Junpo Awards | 2005 | Best Foreign Language Film | Mystic River | Won | |
| Kinema Junpo Awards | 2005 | Readers' Choice Award | Mystic River | Won | |
| Kinema Junpo Awards | 2006 | Best Foreign Language Film | Million Dollar Baby | Won | |
| Kinema Junpo Awards | 2006 | Best Foreign Language Film Director | Million Dollar Baby | Won | |
| Kinema Junpo Awards | 2006 | Readers' Choice Award | Million Dollar Baby | Won | |
| Kinema Junpo Awards | 2007 | Best Foreign Language Film | Flags of Our Fathers | Won | |
| Kinema Junpo Awards | 2007 | Best Foreign Language Film Director | Flags of Our Fathers | Won | |
| Kinema Junpo Awards | 2007 | Readers' Choice Award | Flags of Our Fathers | Won | |
| Mainichi Film Awards | 1994 | Best Foreign Language Film | Unforgiven | Won | |
| Mainichi Film Awards | 1996 | Readers' Choice Award | The Bridges of Madison County | Won | |
| Mainichi Film Awards | 2001 | Mainichi Film Concours | Space Cowboys | Won | |
| Mainichi Film Awards | 2005 | Mainichi Film Concours | Mystic River | Won | |
| National Board of Review | 2008 | Best Actor | Gran Torino | Won | |
| People's Choice Awards | 1981 | Favorite Motion Picture Actor | Himself | Won | |
| People's Choice Awards | 1984 | Favorite Motion Picture Actor | Himself | Won | |
| People's Choice Awards | 1985 | Favorite Motion Picture Actor | Himself | Won | |
| People's Choice Awards | 1987 | Favorite Motion Picture Actor | Himself | Won | |
| People's Choice Awards | 1988 | Favorite All-Time Motion Picture Star | Himself | Won | |
| Producers Guild Awards | 2004 | Motion Picture Producer of the Year Award | Mystic River | Nominated | |
| Robert Awards | 2004 | Best American Film | Mystic River | Nominated | |
| Robert Awards | 2006 | Best American Film | Million Dollar Baby | Won | |
| Satellite Awards | 2004 | Best Director | Mystic River | Nominated | |
| Satellite Awards | 2006 | Best Original Score | Flags of Our Fathers | Nominated | |
| Satellite Awards | 2006 | Best Director | Flags of Our Fathers | Won | |
| Satellite Awards | 2007 | Best Original Song | Grace Is Gone | Won | |
| Saturn Awards | 2001 | Best Actor | Space Cowboys | Nominated | |
| Saturn Awards | 2001 | Best Director | Space Cowboys | Nominated | |
| Saturn Awards | 2009 | Best Director | Changeling | Nominated | |
| Saturn Awards | 2009 | Best Music | Changeling | Nominated | |
| Western Heritage Awards | 1961 | Fictional Television Drama | Rawhide | Won | |
| Western Heritage Awards | 1962 | Fictional Television Drama | Rawhide | Won | |
| Western Heritage Awards | 1964 | Fictional Television Drama | Rawhide | Won | |
| Western Heritage Awards | 1993 | Theatrical Motion Picture | Unforgiven | Won | |

== Critics awards ==
| Organizations | Year | Category | Work | Result | Ref. |
|---|---|---|---|---|---|
| Argentine Film Critics Association | 2004 | Best Foreign Feature Film | Mystic River | Nominated | |
| Argentine Film Critics Association | 2008 | Best Foreign Feature Film | Letters from Iwo Jima | Nominated | |
| Chicago Film Critics Association | 2003 | Best Director | Mystic River | Nominated | |
| Chicago Film Critics Association | 2004 | Best Director | Million Dollar Baby | Won | |
| Chicago Film Critics Association | 2006 | Best Director | Letters from Iwo Jima | Nominated | |
| Chicago Film Critics Association | 2008 | Best Actor | Gran Torino | Nominated | |
| Film Critics Circle of Australia | 2005 | Best Foreign Film | Million Dollar Baby | Won | |
| London Film Critics' Circle | 2004 | Director of the Year | Mystic River | Won | |
| Los Angeles Film Critics Association | 1992 | Best Actor | Unforgiven | Won | |
| Los Angeles Film Critics Association | 1992 | Best Director | Unforgiven | Won | |
| National Society of Film Critics | 1993 | Best Director | Unforgiven | Won | |
| National Society of Film Critics | 2004 | Best Director | Mystic River | Won | |
| New York Film Critics Circle Awards | 2003 | Best Director | Million Dollar Baby | Won | |
| Online Film Critics Society | 2004 | Best Director | Mystic River | Nominated | |
| Online Film Critics Society | 2005 | Best Director | Million Dollar Baby | Nominated | |
| San Diego Film Critics Society | 2004 | Best Director | Million Dollar Baby | Won | |
| San Diego Film Critics Society | 2004 | Best Original Score | Million Dollar Baby | Won | |
| San Diego Film Critics Society | 2006 | Best Director | Letters from Iwo Jima | Won | |
| Vancouver Film Critics Circle | 2005 | Best Director | Million Dollar Baby | Won | |
| Washington D.C. Area Film Critics Association | 2003 | Best Director | Mystic River | Nominated | |
| Washington D.C. Area Film Critics Association | 2009 | Best Director | Invictus | Nominated | |

== Honorary awards ==
| Organizations | Year | Notes | Result | Ref. |
|---|---|---|---|---|
| American Academy of Achievement | 1980 | Golden Plate Award | Honored | |
| Hollywood Foreign Press Association | 1988 | Golden Globe Cecil B. DeMille Award | Honored | |
| Academy of Motion Picture Arts and Sciences | 1995 | Irving G. Thalberg Memorial Award | Honored | |
| American Film Institute | 1996 | AFI Life Achievement Award | Honored | |
| Film Society of Lincoln Center | 1996 | Chaplin Gala Tribute | Honored | |
| César Awards | 1998 | Honorary César | Honored | |
| Producers Guild of America | 1998 | Lifetime Achievement Award in Motion Pictures | Honored | |
| National Board of Review | 1999 | Career Achievement Award | Honored | |
| Venice Film Festival | 2000 | Career Golden Lion | Honored | |
| John F. Kennedy Center for the Performing Arts | 2000 | Kennedy Center Honors | Honored | |
| Art Directors Guild | 2001 | Contribution to Cinematic Imagery Award | Honored | |
| San Francisco Film Festival | 2001 | Akira Kurosawa Award | Honored | |
| Chicago International Film Festival | 2002 | Career Achievement Award | Honored | |
| Cannes Film Festival | 2003 | Carrosse d'Or | Honored | |
| BAFTA/LA Britannia Awards | 2006 | Stanley Kubrick Excellence in Film Award | Honored | |
| Directors Guild of America | 2006 | Lifetime Achievement Award | Honored | |
| Producers Guild of America | 2006 | Milestone Award | Honored | |
| Cannes Film Festival | 2008 | Honorary Palme d'Or | Honored | |
| National Endowment for the Arts | 2009 | National Medal of Arts | Honored | |
| Navy SEAL Foundation | 2015 | Patriot Award | Honored | |

== Directed Academy Award Performances ==
Under Eastwood's direction, these actors received Academy Award nominations and wins for their performances in these respective roles.

| Year | Performer | Film | Result |
|---|---|---|---|
Academy Award for Best Actor
| 1993 | Himself | Unforgiven | Nominated |
| 2004 | Sean Penn | Mystic River | Won |
| 2005 | Himself | Million Dollar Baby | Nominated |
| 2010 | Morgan Freeman | Invictus | Nominated |
| 2015 | Bradley Cooper | American Sniper | Nominated |
Academy Award for Best Supporting Actor
| 1993 | Gene Hackman | Unforgiven | Won |
| 2004 | Tim Robbins | Mystic River | Won |
| 2005 | Morgan Freeman | Million Dollar Baby | Won |
| 2010 | Matt Damon | Invictus | Nominated |
Academy Award for Best Actress
| 1996 | Meryl Streep | The Bridges of Madison County | Nominated |
| 2005 | Hilary Swank | Million Dollar Baby | Won |
| 2009 | Angelina Jolie | Changeling | Nominated |
Academy Award for Best Supporting Actress
| 2004 | Marcia Gay Harden | Mystic River | Nominated |
| 2020 | Kathy Bates | Richard Jewell | Nominated |

== Bibliography ==
- Levy, Shawn (2025). Clint: The Man and the Movies. HarperCollins. ISBN 9780063251021.
- Emery, Robert J. (2003). The Directors: Take 3. Allworth Press. ISBN 1-58115-245-0.
