= Clint Eastwood bibliography =

This is a list of books and essays about Clint Eastwood.

- Beard, William, ed. (2000). Persistence of double vision: essays on Clint Eastwood. University of Alberta. ISBN 9780888643568.
- Bingham, Dennis (1994). Acting male: masculinities in the films of James Stewart, Jack Nicholson, and Clint Eastwood. Rutgers University Press.
- Cornell, Drucilla (2009). Clint Eastwood and issues of American masculinity (1st ed.). New York: Fordham University Press. ISBN 978-0823230129.
- Eastwood, Clint; Kapsis, Robert E.; Coblentz, Kathie (1 December 2012). Clint Eastwood: Interviews, Revised and Updated. Jackson: University Press of Mississippi. ISBN 978-1-61703-663-7.
- Eliot, Marc (2009). American Rebel: The Life of Clint Eastwood. New York: Harmony Books. ISBN 978-0-307-33688-0.
- Engel, Leonard (2007). Clint Eastwood, Actor and Director: New Perspectives. Salt Lake City: University of Utah Press. ISBN 978-0-87480-900-8.
- Foote, John H. (2009). Clint Eastwood : evolution of a filmmaker (1. publ. ed.). Westport, Conn.: Praeger. ISBN 978-0313352478.
- Frank, Alan (1982). Clint Eastwood: Screen Greats. New York: Exeter. ISBN 0-89673-135-9.
- Frayling, Christopher (1992). Clint Eastwood. London: Virgin. ISBN 0-86369-307-5.
- Freeman, Michael Goldman; foreword, Steven Spielberg; preface, Morgan (2012). Clint Eastwood : master filmmaker at work. New York, NY: Abrams. ISBN 978-1419703881.
- Gallafent, Edward (1994). Clint Eastwood. New York: Continuum. ISBN 0-8264-0665-3.
- Johnstone, Iain (2007). The Man with No Name: The Biography of Clint Eastwood. London: Plexus. ISBN 978-0-85965-026-7.
- Kapsis, Robert E.; Coblentz, Kathie, eds. (1999). Clint Eastwood: Interviews. Jackson: University Press of Mississippi. ISBN 1-57806-070-2.
- Kitses, Jim (2004). Horizons West. Directing the Western from John Ford to Clint Eastwood. London: British Film Institute.
- Knapp, Laurence F. (1996). Directed by Clint Eastwood: eighteen films analyzed. McFarland & Company. ISBN 978-0-7864-0271-7.
- Levy, Shawn (2025). Clint: The Man and the Movies. HarperCollins. ISBN 9780063251021.
- Locke, Sondra (1997). The Good, the Bad & the Very Ugly: A Hollywood Journey. New York: William Morrow and Company. ISBN 978-0-688-15462-2.
- McGilligan, Patrick (2015). Clint: The Life and Legend (updated and revised). New York: OR Books. ISBN 978-1-939293-96-1.
- Miller, William I. (1998). "Clint Eastwood and Equity: Popular Culture's Theory of Revenge". In Sarat, A.; Kearns, T. R. (eds.). Law in the Domains of Culture. Ann Arbor, Michigan: University of Michigan Press. pp. 161–202.
- Modleski, Tania (2010). "Clint Eastwood and Male Weepies". American Literary History. 22 (1): 136–158. doi:10.1093/alh/ajp051.
- Munn, Michael (1992). Clint Eastwood: Hollywood's Loner. London: Robson. ISBN 978-0-86051-790-0.
- O'Brien, Daniel (1996). Clint Eastwood: Film-Maker. London: B. T. Batsford. ISBN 0-7134-7839-X.
- Plantinga, Carl (1998). "Spectacles of Death: Clint Eastwood and Violence in" Unforgiven"". Cinema Journal: 65–83. doi:10.2307/1225643. JSTOR 1225643.
- Schickel, Richard (1996). Clint Eastwood: A Biography. New York: Knopf. ISBN 978-0-679-42974-6.
- Sheehan, Henry (1992). "Scraps of hope: Clint Eastwood and the Western". Film Comment. 28 (5).
- Smith, Paul (1993). Clint Eastwood: A Cultural Production. U of Minnesota Press. ISBN 978-0-8166-1960-3.
- Tanitch, Robert (1995). Clint Eastwood. Studio Vista Books. ISBN 978-0-289-80132-1.
- Thompson, Douglas (2005). Clint Eastwood portrait of a legend. London: Blake. ISBN 1857825721.
- Thompson, Richard; Hunter, Tim (1976). "Clint Eastwood, Auteur". Film Comment. 14.
- Tibbets, John C. (1 January 1993). "Clint Eastwood and the Machinery of Violence". Literature/Film Quarterly. 21 (1). Archived from the original on 2015-12-27 – via Questia.
- Vaux, Sara Anson (2012). The ethical vision of Clint Eastwood. Grand Rapids, Mich.: William B. Eerdmans Pub. Co. ISBN 978-0802862952.
- Verlhac, Pierre-Henri (3 September 2008). Clint Eastwood: A Life in Pictures. Chronicle Books. ISBN 978-0-8118-6154-0.
- Zmijewsky, Boris; Lee Pfeiffer (1982). The Films of Clint Eastwood. Secaucus, New Jersey: Citadel Press. ISBN 0-8065-0863-9.

== Common disinformation ==
Eastwood's former partner Sondra Locke (1944–2018) lied about her age all of her professional life and, at times, was inconsistent in terms of how many years she shaved off. Only posthumously—after half a century of quoting lies—did the press widely concede that Locke, in fact, was born in 1944. This premise-altering substitution discounts the McGilligan, Schickel, Eliot, Munn, O'Brien, Johnstone and Thompson biographies, not to mention Locke's own memoir, all of which peg her age to a later birthdate. Shawn Levy's book Clint: The Man and the Movies, published seven years after Locke's death, is the first Eastwood biography to discuss Locke with accurate context and not under the false premise of younger age.
