= Father of the Bride (franchise) =

American film franchise

- Official franchise logo, released in 1991
- Based on: Father of the Bride by Edward Streeter
- Distributed by: Metro-Goldwyn-Mayer; The Walt Disney Company; Warner Bros. Pictures; Turner Entertainment Co.; Netflix
- Country: United States
- Language: English

The Father of the Bride franchise consists of a series of released comedy and romantic comedy films, based on the premise of the 1949 novel of the same name. The film adaptations respectively depict the events of wedding preparations from the point of view of an overly-protective father, and his growing realizations that his daughter has grown.

Developed by MGM in 1950 as a comedy, the original film was critically and financially successful, and was followed by a sequel in 1951. In 1991, The Walt Disney Company purchased the film rights to the story and adapted a romantic comedy remake through its Touchstone Pictures film studio, followed by a sequel in 1995. Both Disney films update the story to a then-contemporary setting. Though the remakes were not critically acclaimed releases, they have subsequently gained cult status within their respective genre. A third installment, "mini-sequel", was filmed during the COVID-19 pandemic and was released on September 25, 2020, to support World Central Kitchen's efforts in relieving those affected by the coronavirus.

A reboot of the franchise was developed at Warner Bros. Pictures as an exclusive for the company's HBO Max streaming service and was released on June 16, 2022.

== Origin ==
The 1949 satirical comedy novel, Father of the Bride, written by Edward Streeter serves the inspiration for the film adaptations.

The story centers around Stanley Banks and his troublesome attempts to adapt to his daughter's engagement. The story provides readers with insight into the mind of an overprotective father, and the comedic scenarios that follow. Stanley is a working man, who has to pay the expensive bill for a wedding he doesn't accept wholeheartedly. Over the course of the story, he has a change of heart and comes to understand that he must welcome the next phase of life. Illustrations for the book were provided by Gluyas Williams.

== Films ==
Film	U.S. release date	Director	Screenwriter(s)	Producer(s)
Father of the Bride	June 16, 1950	Vincente Minnelli	Albert Hackett & Frances Goodrich	Pandro S. Berman
Father's Little Dividend	April 27, 1951	Vincente Minnelli	Albert Hackett & Frances Goodrich	Pandro S. Berman
Father of the Bride	December 20, 1991	Charles Shyer	Nancy Meyers, Charles Shyer, Albert Hackett & Frances Goodrich	Carol Baum, Nancy Meyers & Howard Rosenman
Father of the Bride, Part II	December 8, 1995	Charles Shyer	Nancy Meyers & Charles Shyer	Nancy Meyers
Father of the Bride, Part 3(ish)	September 25, 2020	Nancy Meyers	Nancy Meyers	Adam Nicely
Father of the Bride	June 16, 2022	Gaz Alazraki	Matt Lopez	Dede Gardner & Jeremy Kleiner

=== Father of the Bride (1950) ===
When the doting, middle-class working, father Stanley Banks, learns that his beautiful daughter Kay is engaged to Buckley Dunstan, a series of comical difficulties arise. Stan navigates a range of wedding planning problems ranging from monetary to emotional, all while his wife Ellie tries to keep the peace and remain calm. His love for his daughter grows as Stan realizes he is the father of the bride, and that she has grown up.

=== Father's Little Dividend (1951) ===
One year following the wedding of their daughter, Stanley and Ellie Banks are surprised with news that their daughter Kay is pregnant. While everyone fawns over Kay and the excitement of the upcoming newborn, Stan broods, as he is not yet ready to be a grandfather. When the family continues to prepare for the coming baby's nursery and debates over what name it shall have, Stan finds himself being the one that Kay turns to for help because of his mellow facade. In helping his daughter realize that she is ready to be a mother, Stan realizes that he too can find excitement in the coming events.

=== Father of the Bride (1991) ===
A remake released in 1991, the events of the plot were updated for a contemporary audience. Though the critical reception upon release was mixed, the movie has subsequently been deemed a romantic comedy "cult classic" film.

George Banks and his wife Nina, are the proud doting parents of their daughter Annie. They are both surprised when she returns home from studying abroad, and announces that she is engaged to a man she met in Rome, Italy. George's whole world turns upside down, as the overprotective father copes with advancing to his daughter's next stage of life. Nina's excitement contrasts and equals the apprehension of George. The pair quickly navigates the wedding preparations including, meeting the in-laws, an eccentric wedding planner and his flamboyant assistant named Franck and Howard respectively. When things continue to move at a pace out of his control, George comes to terms with the reality that his daughter has grown up and happily walks her down the aisle.

=== Father of the Bride, Part II (1995) ===
A sequel to Father of the Bride (1991), and a partial remake of Father's Little Dividend, Part II picks up where the previous installment left off. The sequel received a less favorable critical reception than its predecessor but once again became a romantic comedy cult classic movie, albeit this time.

As George adjusts to the reality that his daughter is married and that his son Matty is growing up, he initiates plans to sell his home with retirement in mind. Annie announces that she is pregnant. Upon realizing that he will become a grandfather, George must come to terms with the fact that he is aging. Not ready to be a senior citizen, George begins a series of comical events associated with a midlife crisis. Amid these events George receives even more surprising news, when his wife Nina reveals that she is also expecting a baby. Realizing that he will go from being the father of the bride to the father of the newborn, George navigates preparations for the two babies. The family receives assistance from the eccentric Franck Eggelhoffer in planning the baby showers and preparing the nursery. Throughout these events, George realizes that he will get to experience the joys of parenthood with Nina all over again, with his upcoming baby. He repurchases his home and finds excitement in fathering his baby daughter, Megan.

=== Father of the Bride, Part 3(ish) (2020) ===
Developments for a third installment began as early as 1996, following the release of Father of the Bride Part II. Though the second film did not perform as well as the first movie, Charles Shyer and Nancy Meyers were confirmed to return in their respective roles. The project however, remained in various stages of development hell since its inception. In February 2014, Hollywood Reporter Nikki Fink exclusively reported that the script was finished, and would center around the wedding of Matty Banks. He stated that the character would be gay, and that the story would center around George coming to terms with his son's sexuality. Steve Martin seemingly debunked the report, one day later. By October 2017, George Newbern stated that a script written by Charles Shyer had been completed. Various actors from the first two films, expressed interest at different times in returning for a third film. Following reports that The Walt Disney Company is rebooting the franchise, talks of a third film dissipated.

In September 2020, Nancy Meyers announced a follow-up to the first two films was coming. The first teaser trailer was released on September 23, with an official preview released the following day. The "mini-sequel" was written and directed by Meyers, with the plot including a family reunion over Zoom at the request of Matty Banks, and depicted George Banks' reaction to 2020. Steve Martin, Diane Keaton, Kimberly Williams-Paisley, Kieran Culkin, George Newbern, and Martin Short reprised their respective roles, with Alexandra Shipp and Robert De Niro joining. The film benefited World Central Kitchen charity, supporting families and children who suffer due to the COVID-19 pandemic. Father of the Bride 3(ish) was released on September 25, 2020, exclusively through Netflix while also streaming on the service's YouTube and Facebook pages.

=== Father of the Bride (2022) ===
In September 2020, it was announced that a Latin adaptation centered around Cuban-Americans is in development with a script written by Matt Lopez. By February 2021, Gaz Alazraki signed on as director. Andy García starred as Guillermo "Billy" Herrera, the titular character in addition to serving as executive producer, while Jeremy Kleiner and Dede Gardner served as producers. The project is intended to be a joint-venture production between Warner Bros. Pictures, and Plan B Entertainment with HBO Max distributing. It was released on June 16, 2022.

=== Future ===
In February 2018, it was announced that various remakes were in development from The Walt Disney Company for their Disney+ streaming service, drawing from their library of intellectual properties. One of the projects named in the announcement was Father of the Bride. Following the release of Father of the Bride Part 3(ish), various sources expressed hopes for an eventual feature length follow-up would be developed. Though Walt Disney Pictures is continuing to work on a feature film for Disney+, it is not clear whether it will be a continuation or standalone movie. In September 2020, Williams-Paisley confirmed that there are ongoing conversations with the involvement of Nancy Meyers for a follow-up feature film.

== Television ==
Series	Season(s)	Episodes	Originally released			Showrunner	Executive producers	Status
Series	Season(s)	Episodes	First released	Last released	Network	Showrunner	Executive producers	Status
Father of the Bride	1	34	September 29, 1961	September 14, 1962	Columbia Broadcasting System (CBS)	Robert Maxwell	Robert Mawell, and Rudy E. Abel	Ended

Produced as a made-for-television adaptation based on the novel, and the success of its 1950 film adaptation and the following 1951 sequel, the television series was produced by MGM Television under the direction of executive producer Robert Maxwell. Starring Leon Ames, Ruth Warrick, and Myrna Fahey, in the lead roles of Stanley Banks, Eleanor Banks, and Katherine Banks-Dunston, respectively; the premise was faithful to its source material. Rickie Sorensen, Burt Metcalfe, Ransom Sherman, and Lurene Tuttle appeared in supporting roles. The series aired on CBS from September 29, 1961, through Mary 25, 1962; while reruns followed thereafter.

== Main cast and characters ==
List indicators

This section includes characters who will appear or have appeared in the franchise in main roles.

- An empty grey cell indicates the character was not in the film, or that the character's official presence has not yet been confirmed.
- ^{A} indicates an appearance through archival footage or audio.
- ^{Y} indicates a younger version of the character.

Character	Film						Television
Character	Father of the Bride	Father's Little Dividend	Father of the Bride	Father of the Bride Part II	Father of the Bride Part 3(ish)	Father of the Bride	Father of the Bride
Character	1950	1951	1991	1995	2020	2022	1961–1962
Principal cast
Stanley T. Banks	Spencer Tracy	Spencer Tracy					Leon Ames
Eleanor "Ellie" Banks	Joan Bennett	Joan Bennett					Ruth Warrick
Katherine "Kay" Banks-Dunstan	Elizabeth Taylor	Elizabeth Taylor					Myrna Fahey
Thomas "Tommy" Banks	Russ Tamblyn	Russ Tamblyn					Rickie Sorensen
Buckley Dunstan	Don Taylor	Don Taylor					Burt Metcalfe
Herbert Dunstan	Moroni Olsen	Moroni Olsen					Ransom Sherman
Doris Dunstan	Billie Burke	Billie Burke					Lurene Tuttle
Reverend Galsworthy	Paul Harvey	Paul Harvey					
Stanley Banks-Dunstan		Donald Clark & Ruta Fox					
Ben Banks		Tom Irish					
Delilah		Marietta Canty					Ruby Dandridge
Dr. Andrew Nordell		Hayden Rorke					
George Stanley Banks			Steve Martin	Steve Martin	Steve Martin		
Nina Banks (née Dickerson)			Diane Keaton	Diane Keaton	Diane Keaton		
Anne "Annie" Banks-MacKenzie			Kimberly Williams Amy Young^{Y} Sarah Rose Karr^{Y} Marissa Lefton^{Y}	Kimberly Williams Stephanie Miller^{Y} Hallie Meyers-Shyer^{Y}	Kimberly Williams-Paisley		
Matthew "Matty" Banks			Kieran Culkin	Kieran Culkin	Kieran Culkin		
Bryan MacKenzie			George Newbern	George Newbern	George Newbern		
Franck Eggelhoffer			Martin Short	Martin Short	Martin Short		
John MacKenzie			Peter Michael Goetz	Peter Michael Goetz			
Joanna MacKenzie			Kate McGregor-Stewart	Kate McGregor-Stewart			
Howard Weinstein			BD Wong	BD Wong			
Megan Banks				Katie Pierce Jerri Rose White & Shannon Kennedy^{Y}	Florence Pugh Katie Pierce^{Y}^{A} Jerri Rose White^{Y}^{A}		
George "Georgie" MacKenzie				Jonathan Selstad & Thomas Selstad Casey Boersma & Dylan Boersma^{Y}	Ben Platt Thomas Selstad^{Y}^{A}		
Dr. Megan Eisenberg				Jane Adams			
Mr. Habib				Eugene Levy			
Nurse Diana Blackwell				Susan Beaubian			
Rachel Banks					Alexandra Shipp		
James					Robert De Niro		
Guillermo "Billy" Herrera						Andy García	
Ingrid Herrera						Gloria Estefan Emily Estefan^{Y}	
Sofia Herrera-Castillo						Adria Arjona	
Cora Herrera						Isabela Merced	
Adan Castillo						Diego Boneta	
Natalie Vance						Chloe Fineman	
Hernan Castillo						Pedro Damián	

== Additional crew and production details ==
Film	Crew/Detail					
Film	Composer(s)	Cinematographer(s)	Editor(s)	Production companies	Distributing company	Running time
Father of the Bride	Adolph Deutsch	John Alton	Ferris Webster	Metro-Goldwyn-Mayer, I.A.T.S.E.	Metro-Goldwyn-Mayer	1 hr 32 mins
Father's Little Dividend	Albert Sendrey	John Alton	Ferris Webster	Metro-Goldwyn-Mayer	Metro-Goldwyn-Mayer	1 hr 22 mins
Father of the Bride (The Series)	David Raksin, Thomas Cutkomp, David Raksin, Alexander Courage, Lyn Murray, and Lou Maury	Hal Mohr, Benjamin H. Kline, William E. Snyder, Paul Vogel, Gordon Avil, Curt Fetters, Brick Marquard, Robert Pittack, Ray Rennahan, and William W. Spencer	Robert Stafford, Frederick Y. Smith, Thomas Scott, John Baxter Rogers, John D. Dunning, Archie Dattelbaum, Jason H. Bernie, John McSweeney Jr., Joseph Gluck, James E. Newcom, William B. Gulick, Douglas Stewart, Joseph Dervin, and Fredric Steinkamp	MGM Television	Columbia Broadcasting System	15 hrs (30 mins/episode)
Father of the Bride	Alan Silvestri	John Lindley	Richard Marks	Touchstone Pictures, Sandollar Productions, Touchwood Pacific Partners (I) L.P.	Buena Vista Pictures	1 hr 45 mins
Father of the Bride, Part II	Alan Silvestri	Elliot Davis & William A. Fraker	Adam Bernardi & Stephen A. Rotter	Touchstone Pictures, Sandollar Productions, Taylor-Made Productions, The Meyers/Shyer Company	Buena Vista Pictures	1 hr 46 mins
Father of the Bride, Part 3(ish)	Alan Silvestri	Dean Cundey	David Bilow	Netflix Original Films, The Meyers/Shyer Company	Netflix	24 mins
Father of the Bride	Terence Blanchard	Igor Jadue-Lillo	Jon Poll	Warner Bros. Pictures, Plan B Entertainment	HBO Max	1 hr 58 mins
Untitled film	TBA	TBA	TBA	Walt Disney Pictures	Disney+, The Walt Disney Company	TBA

== Reception ==
=== Box office and financial performance ===
Film	Box office gross			Box office ranking		Budget	Net income	Ref.
Film	North America	Other territories	Worldwide	All-time North America	All-time worldwide	Budget	Net income	Ref.
Father of the Bride (1950)	$4,036,000	$2,048,000	$6,084,000	not available	not available	$1,215,000	$4,869,000	
Father's Little Dividend	$3,122,000	$1,500,000	$4,622,000	not available	not available	$941,000	$3,681,000	
Father of the Bride (1991)	$89,325,780	$40,000,000	$129,325,780	No. 857	#1,799	≈$20,000,000	≤$109,325,780	
Father of the Bride, Part II	$76,594,107	$26,000,000	$102,594,107	#1,041	#2,030	≈$30,000,000	≤$72,594,107	
Father of the Bride, Part 3(ish)	—N/a	—N/a	—N/a	—N/a	—N/a	Information not publicly available	—N/a	
Father of the Bride (2022)	—N/a	—N/a	—N/a	—N/a	—N/a	Information not publicly available	>$0	
Untitled film						TBA		—N/a

=== Critical and public response ===
Film	Rotten Tomatoes	Metacritic	CinemaScore
Father of the Bride (1950)	93% (31 reviews)	—N/a	—N/a
Father's Little Dividend	100% (10 reviews)	—N/a	—N/a
Father of the Bride (The Series)	TBD	—N/a	—N/a
Father of the Bride (1991)	70% (44 reviews)	51/100 (17 reviews)	A−
Father of the Bride, Part II	52% (25 reviews)	49/100 (16 reviews)	A−
Father of the Bride, Part 3(ish)	—N/a	—N/a	—N/a
Father of the Bride (2022)	80% (55 reviews)	65/100 (13 reviews)	—N/a
Untitled film			

== See also ==
- Guess Who's Coming to Dinner
- Guess Who
- Why Him?
- List of romantic comedy films
