= Father of the Bride =

The Father of the Bride is commonly one of the wedding ceremony participants.

Father of the Bride may also refer to:

- Father of the Bride (novel), 1949, by Edward Streeter
  - Father of the Bride (franchise), media franchise based on the 1949 novel.
    - Father of the Bride (1950 film), adaptation of the 1949 novel, starring Spencer Tracy, Joan Bennett, and Elizabeth Taylor
    - Father of the Bride (TV series), 1961–1962
    - Father of the Bride (1991 film), remake of the 1950 film, starring Steve Martin, Diane Keaton and Martin Short
    - Father of the Bride Part II (1995), sequel to the 1991 film and remake of the 1951 sequel Father's Little Dividend
    - Father of the Bride (2022 film), adaptation of the novel, starring Andy García and Gloria Estefan
- Father of the Bride (album), 2019, by Vampire Weekend
- "Father of the Bride" (Frasier episode)
- "Father of the Bride", twentieth episode of the eleventh season of CSI: Crime Scene Investigation
- "Father of the Bride", short story by Connie Willis
