= Lucky 7 (film) =

2003 American TV film

- Written by: Jessica Barondes
- Directed by: Harry Winer
- Starring: Kimberly Williams-Paisley; Patrick Dempsey; Brad Rowe; Brian Markinson; Gail O'Grady
- Music by: Danny Lux
- Country of origin: United States
- Original language: English

Production
- Producer: Judy Cairo
- Cinematography: Jon Joffin
- Editor: David A. Simmons
- Running time: 95 minutes
- Production companies: Lions Gate Television; Carlton America

Original release
- Network: ABC Family
- Release: July 20, 2003

Lucky 7 is a 2003 American television film starring Patrick Dempsey and Kimberly Williams. The film premiered on ABC Family on July 20, 2003. In the film, a female lawyer arranges her life according to the predictions of her deceased mother. Her mother predicted that she would marry her 7th boyfriend, but the lawyer is confused when she concurrently dates two boyfriends following a break-up. Which one is the 6th boyfriend and which one the 7th boyfriend is unclear to her.

== Plot ==
Amy Myer lives her life based on a timeline that her mother made for her at age seven. Her dying mother told her to become an attorney (which she does) and to marry her seventh boyfriend. However, when she falls head over heels for her sixth boyfriend, Daniel McCandles, she decides to find another sixth boyfriend to dump so that Daniel gets the seventh spot.

When her family asks what the definition is that constitutes a boyfriend, she claims that it would be the seventh man to call her his girlfriend. She breaks up with boyfriend #5 and meets Daniel, who she thinks is perfect for her. Wanting him to be the seventh boyfriend, she goes in search of a #6 so she can date him before Daniel. She then settles on Peter Connor, a local bagel shop owner who is in love with her. Unfortunately, things don't go as planned when Amy realizes that she has feelings for him as well.

Peter runs a bagel shop, and asks Amy to accompany him to a wedding on Orcas Is. She initially turns him down, but then sees him as a #6. They both go to the wedding, and he tells her that he has told his friends at the wedding that they're dating, mentioning the word "girlfriend". This locks Peter into slot #, driving the two to act like a couple around his friends and ex-girlfriend. The latter had previously dumped Peter after he resigned from Bear Stearns (not knowing Peter generated a great deal of money while working there), and is now married to someone else. Amy and Peter end up sleeping together, but she sees it as a mistake. When Peter asks why, she tells him about the timeline, and he asks what happens after marriage, since the plan ends there.

Amy and Daniel go to a work dinner party that night. Daniel has told his boss they were dating and that she is his girlfriend, making Daniel #7 by her own declaration. However, Amy realizes she no longer wants Daniel to have the seventh spot, since she has feelings for Peter, and tells Daniel that they have never even held hands, let alone sex. She leaves to find Peter, but he isn't at works. She eventually finds him at the island of the wedding they had previously attended together, which he apparently owns. They meet up and embrace, and she says that she has quit her job and is starting fresh. Peter offers her a job at the bagel shop, and the movie closes with Peter and Amy getting dressed for their wedding in Amy's apartment.

== Cast ==
- Kimberly Williams-Paisley as Amy Myer
- Patrick Dempsey as Peter Connor
- Brad Rowe as Daniel McCandles
- Lochlyn Munro as Ray
- Michelle Harrison as Maya
- Brian Markinson as Bernie Myer
- Gail O'Grady as Rachel Myer

== Reception ==
CineMagazine rated the film 3 stars.
