= Identity theft (disambiguation) =

Identity theft is a crime committed using the personal data of another person.

Identity theft may also refer to:

- Identity Theft (film)
- Identity Theft, an episode of the series The Closer
- Identity Theft, an episode of the series Harvey Birdman, Attorney at Law
- Identity Theft, an episode of the series Slow Horses
- "Identity Theft" (Kodak Black song)
