= Coldblooded (film) =

- Directed by: Wallace Wolodarsky
- Written by: Wallace Wolodarsky
- Produced by: Larry Estes; Michael J. Fox; Brad Jenkel; Brad Krevoy; Steven Stabler; Matt Tolmach
- Starring: Jason Priestley; Peter Riegert; Kimberly Williams; Janeane Garofalo; Robert Loggia
- Cinematography: Robert D. Yeoman
- Edited by: Craig Bassett
- Music by: Steve Bartek
- Production companies: PolyGram Filmed Entertainment; Propaganda Films
- Distributed by: IRS Media (North America); PolyGram Filmed Entertainment (international)
- Release dates: September 15, 1995 (United States); November 2, 1995 (Germany); May 5, 1996 (Czech Republic, Slovakia)
- Running time: 92 minutes
- Country: United States
- Language: English
- Box office: $16,198

Coldblooded is a 1995 American black comedy thriller film about hitmen directed by Wallace Wolodarsky and starring Jason Priestley, Peter Riegert, Robert Loggia, Kimberly Williams and Janeane Garofalo.

== Plot ==
Cosmo works as a bookie for Mafioso Max. He lives a dull life, residing in the basement of a retirement home, never having had a girlfriend or a date, but regularly seeing prostitute Honey.

When Max dies, new Boss Gordon "promotes" Cosmo to hitman, against his wishes. He is shown the ropes by current hitman Steve, who soon notices that Cosmo is a natural talent: an excellent shot and very calm under pressure.

When Cosmo feels remorseful and tense after his first murder, a delinquent debtor, Honey suggests Yoga. After class, Yoga teacher Jasmine comforts him when she sees him crying, which annoys her insensitive boyfriend Randy.

When Cosmo talks to Steve about his feelings and tells him that he wants out, Steve confesses that he himself is haunted every night by his guilt and drinks heavily to dull the pain. During some of their next jobs, Steve seems to be affected by his alcoholism and makes mistakes, getting shot during one of them. He has to recuperate, leading Cosmo to perform some hits alone.

Cosmo sees Jasmine cry over her boyfriend after class, comforts her and takes her out for a drink. They get along well and go on some dates. He talks to Steve about Jasmine and they conclude that he has fallen in love.

When Jasmine dumps Randy, he arrives at her apartment while Cosmo is there. Cosmo suggests to Jasmine he talk with Randy while she hides, and she agrees. Cosmo pistol-whips and threatens him, then questions a bloody and visibly shaken Randy about Jasmine's preferences and desires, before successfully scaring him off. Jasmine, who did not see Cosmo's violence, is very thankful.

Gordon requests Cosmo kill Steve, which upsets him. He declares his love for Jasmine and they have sex. Afterwards, he confesses to her that he is a hitman but promises to stop killing for her. Frightened, she throws him out.

Cosmo visits Steve and again explains that he wants out. Having figured out that Cosmo is there to kill him, Steve tells him that he needs to kill Gordon and his associate John to get out. Cosmo agrees that this is a good plan but explains that he must first kill Steve to be able to get near Gordon, before shooting him. Later that evening, Cosmo goes to Gordon with a hidden gun and shoots him and John dead.

Cosmo goes to Jasmine, explains that he is now finished with killing and reaffirms his love for her, but she rejects him. He tries to kill himself but cannot go through with it, then asks Jasmine to kill him, which she also cannot do. He then suggests murder–suicide. With Cosmo's gun pointed at her, Jasmine convinces herself that their relationship could work and they celebrate with Champagne.

== Cast ==
- Jason Priestley as Cosmo Reif
- Kimberly Williams as Jasmine
- Peter Riegert as Steve
- Robert Loggia as Gordon
- Jay Kogen as John
- Janeane Garofalo as Honey
- Josh Charles as Randy
- David Anthony Higgins as Lance
- Doris Grau as Rose
- Anne Carroll as Receptionist
- Buck McDancer as Fleeing Man
- Marcos A. Ferraez as Man w/Uzi
- Gilbert Rosales ax Man w/Briefcase
- Jim Turner as Doctor
- Michael J. Fox as Tim Alexander
- Talia Balsam as Jean Alexander

== Reception ==
The movie received mixed reviews.
