= Ruben Rabasa =

American actor

Ruben Rabasa is a Cuban-born American actor and comedian best known for his roles in I Think You Should Leave with Tim Robinson and Ant-Man and the Wasp: Quantumania. His appearance in the Netflix variety series shot him to fame after 50 years in acting.

Rabasa parlayed his newfound celebrity into projects including a one-man show.

== Filmography ==
=== Film ===
- Thelma (2024) – Winston
- Ant-Man and the Wasp: Quantumania (2023) – Café Owner
- Father of the Bride (2022) – Tío Walter
- Jack and Jill (2011) – Bathroom Attendant
- The Lost City (2005) – Pizzi
- Police Academy 5: Assignment: Miami Beach (1988) – Julio
- Revenge of the Nerds II: Nerds in Paradise (1987) – Maintenance Man
- Amigos (1985) – Ramón
- Invasion U.S.A. (1985) – Sick Old Man

=== Television ===
- I Think You Should Leave with Tim Robinson (2019) – Focus Group Man #1
- This Is Us (2019) – Eduardo
- Criminal Minds (2011) – Jimmy Mercado
- Wrecked (2016) – Yolonzo
- Agents of S.H.I.E.L.D. (2015) – Mr. Cardozo
- Taina (2001–2002) – Papito/Pepito (12 episodes)
