= Father of the Bride (TV series) =

- Original title card with animated Cupid.
- Genre: Sitcom
- Based on: Father of the Bride by Edward Streeter
- Written by: Charles E. Anderson; Ken Cooper; John Elliotte; Dale Eunson; Katherine Eunson; Mathilda Ferro; Theodore Ferro; Mort Green; Edward Streeter; Carey Wilber
- Directed by: Mort Green; Anton Leader; Fletcher Markle; Gene Reynolds; Richard Whorf
- Starring: Leon Ames; Ruth Warrick; Myrna Fahey
- Theme music composer: David Raksin
- Country of origin: United States
- Original language: English
- No. of seasons: 1
- No. of episodes: 34

Production
- Executive producer: Robert Maxwell
- Producers: Rudolph E. Abel; Mort Green
- Cinematography: Hal Mohr
- Running time: 30 mins. (approx)
- Production company: MGM Television

Original release
- Network: CBS
- Release: September 29, 1961 – September 14, 1962

Related
- Father of the Bride

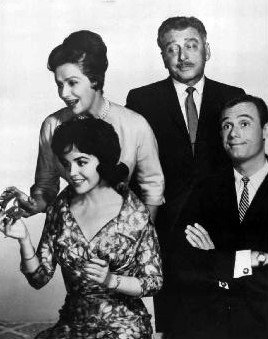
Back row, L-R: Ruth Warrick and Leon Ames. Front row, L-R: Myrna Fahey and Burt Metcalfe.

Father of the Bride is an American sitcom that aired on CBS during the 1961–62 season. The television series centers around the challenges an unready father faces as he adjusts to his daughter's engagement and marriage. Cast members include Leon Ames as the father of the bride, Ruth Warrick as the mother, and Myrna Fahey as the bride.

== Cast ==
- Leon Ames as Stanley Banks
- Ruth Warrick as Eleanor "Ellie" Banks
- Myrna Fahey as Katherine "Kay" Banks Dunston
- Ruby Dandridge as Delilah
- Burt Metcalfe as Buckley Dunston
- Ransom Sherman as Herbert Dunston
- Rickie Sorensen as Thomas "Tommy" Banks
- Lurene Tuttle as Doris Dunston
- Irene Tedrow as Miss Bellamy

== Synopsis ==
Stanley Banks is a prosperous attorney who resides at 24 Maple Drive in Fairview Manor, Connecticut, with his wife Eleanor, who is known as Ellie, teenaged son Tommy, and daughter Katherine, who is known as Kay. Although Ellie, Tommy, and almost everyone else in Stanley's life reacts with enthusiasm when Kay announces her engagement to Buckley Dunston, Stanley is taken aback by the news. In the following days, weeks, and months, the unhappy Stanley, psychologically unready for the marriage of his only daughter, faces many challenges as he tries to adjust to Kay's new life, her fiancé Buckley, Buckley's parents Herbert and Doris Dunston, wedding and honeymoon planning, the wedding itself, Kay and Buckley moving into their own home in a small apartment at 324 Adams Street in Fairview Manor, and life in his own home without Kay around. Kay announces her engagement in the first episode, Kay and Buckley marry in midseason, and shortly before the series ends Kay gives birth to a son named Stanley Banks Dunston.

Stanley works in Manhattan at the law firm of Williston and Banks, where Miss Bellamy is his secretary. Delilah is the housekeeper at the Banks residence in Fairview Manor.

== Production ==
MGM Television produced the series, which was based on the 1949 novel Father of the Bride by Edward Streeter, the hit 1950 film of the same title based on the novel, and the film's successful 1951 sequel Father's Little Dividend.

By March 1962, episodes began increasingly to center around Leon Ames's Stanley Banks character, who "became the dominant figure in the whole show." Even before Father of the Bride came up for consideration for renewal, Myrna Fahey expressed a desire to be released from the show, reportedly because she felt that too much emphasis was being placed on Ames's "father" character and not enough on her Kay Banks Dunston "bride" character.

In early episodes of Father of the Bride, the opening credits feature an animated Cupid wielding a magic wand; while in later episodes, the opening credits feature the show's entire cast gathering on the staircase of the Banks's home.

Robert Maxwell was Father of the Bride′s executive producer, and Rudolph E. Abel and Mort Green produced the show. Episode directors included Mort Green, Anton Leader, Fletcher Markle, Gene Reynolds, and Richard Whorf, and writers included Ken Cooper, Dale & Katherine Eunson, Mathilda Ferro & Theodore Ferro, Mort Green, and James S. Henerson.David Raksin wrote the theme music. Campbell's and General Mills sponsored the show.

== Broadcast history ==
Father of the Bride premiered on September 29, 1961, and 34 episodes were produced, airing on Fridays at 9:30 p.m. The series never gained anything near the popularity of the 1950 and 1951 films on which it was based, and was cancelled after only one season. Its last new episode aired on May 25, 1962. Reruns of the show then aired in its regular time slot until September 14, 1962.

== Episodes ==
No.	Title	Directed by	Written by	Original release date
1	"Bombshell at Breakfast"	Fletcher Markle	Ken Cooper	September 29, 1961
During breakfast one morning, Kay announces that she has accepted Buckley's proposal of marriage.
2	"Buckley"	Fletcher Markle	Ken Cooper	October 6, 1961
Stanley is outraged when he thinks his Buckley has gotten fresh with Kay before they are married and declares that the wedding is off.
3	"Buckley's Parents"	Fletcher Markle	Ken Cooper	October 13, 1961
Despite Ellie's warnings not to, Stanley makes a spectacle of himself at the first formal meeting with his future in-laws, Herbert and Doris, at the Dunston mansion.
4	"The Ring"	Fletcher Markle	Unknown	October 20, 1961
With Doris providing a three-karat stone — a Dunston family heirloom — and Buckley providing the setting, it would seem that everything is taken care of for Kay's engagement ring until Stanley, exercising his rightful role as the prospective father-in-law, picks up the reset ring for Buckley — and promptly loses it.
5	"The Engagement Party"	Fletcher Markle	Unknown	October 27, 1961
Stanley plans to memorize his supposedly "off-the-cuff" speech for Kay and Buckley's engagement party and is sure his part in the event will come off admirably — but he refuses to call in caterers for the engagement party and finds himself stuck in the kitchen while trying to memorize the speech.
6	"Kay's Dinner"	Fletcher Markle	Unknown	November 3, 1961
Preparing her first dinner for her prospective in-laws, Kay ruins the meal, causing Stanley to dash across town to get Ellie to come and save it.
7	"Guest List"	Fletcher Markle	Unknown	November 10, 1961
After all involved agree that Kay and Buckley's wedding will be small, Ellie finds that a small wedding can be more difficult to arrange than a large one when it comes to cutting down the guest list, which continues to grow until Kay and Buckley are to the point of eloping.
8	"Maid of Honor"	Fletcher Markle	Unknown	November 17, 1961
Relations around the Banks household are strained after Kay rejects a friend as her maid-of-honor.
9	"Mr. Massoula"	Fletcher Markle	Mathilda Ferro & Theodore Ferro	November 24, 1961
Ellie calls in the House of Massoula, a catering firm specializing in wedding receptions, for Kay and Buckley′s reception at the Banks home, but when the caterers look over the Banks premises Mr. Massoula decrees it scarcely fit for human occupancy, let alone a reception. Guest stars: James Milhollin, Jonathan Kidd, and Grady Sutton.
10	"White Elephant"	Fletcher Markle	Unknown	December 1, 1961
A traditional "white elephant" among wedding gifts for Kay and Buckley turns out to be a white ceramic elephant.
11	"Stanley's Suit"	Fletcher Markle	Unknown	December 8, 1961
Stanley tries to keep wedding expenses down by wearing the striped trousers and cutaway coat that he wore at his own wedding.
12	"The Shower"	Fletcher Markle	Unknown	December 15, 1961
On the day of Kay's wedding shower, when Kay's female friends gather to shower her with household gifts, Ellie persuades the men of the family to keep out of the way, and Stanley and Tommy decide to go fishing in order to avoid the shower — but Stanley just can't keep out of trouble. Guest star: Malcolm Atterbury, Richard Hale, and Fred Sherman.
13	"The Apartment"	Fletcher Markle	Unknown	December 22, 1961
Kay and Buckley want a nice, cozy apartment for their first home, but when they find one they decide will be perfect Stanley rents it out to someone else and they wind up with a rundown old house instead. Guest stars: Maudie Prickett and King Calder.
14	"Surprise, Surprise!"	Fletcher Markle	Mort Green & Ken Cooper	December 29, 1961
Stanley thinks the family has forgotten his birthday in the flurry of preparations for Kay and Buckley's wedding and that he never will get the golf cart he wants — but he does not realize that his family has planned a surprise party for him.
15	"The Honeymoon"	Fletcher Markle	Unknown	January 5, 1962
A disagreement over honeymoon sites between Kay and Buckley turns into a battle that threatens to wreck their marriage plans.
16	"Homework"	Gene Reynolds	Unknown	January 19, 1962
Stanley offers to help Tommy solve a high school geometry problem, despite realizing that he is not familiar with the subject.
17	"The Rehearsal"	Fletcher Markle	Unknown	January 26, 1962
The entire wedding party is left waiting at the altar when Buckley fails to show up at the rehearsal.
18	"The Wedding"	Anton Leader	Unknown	February 2, 1962
After months of preparation and havoc, Kay and Buckley are married.
19	"The Pine Pillow"	Gene Reynolds	Unknown	February 9, 1962
Stanley accuses the post office of inefficiency when everyone but him receives gifts from the honeymooning Kay and Buckley.
20	"The Homecoming"	Fletcher Markle	Unknown	February 16, 1962
Also titled "Furnishing the Apartment." Kay and Buckley return from their honeymoon to find that their well-meaning in-laws have furnished one apartment and hung draperies in another, but have put nothing in the newlyweds' apartment.
21	"Too Many Cooks"	Gene Reynolds	Unknown	February 23, 1962
Kay gets advice from Doris, then causes a problem when she goes to Ellie for help.
22	"The Quarrel"	Gene Reynolds	Unknown	March 2, 1962
Kay threatens divorce when Buckley rebels against her comparison of him to Stanley.
23	"Tommy's Hero"	Gene Reynolds	Unknown	March 9, 1962
Stanley thinks he has lost both Kay and Tommy to Buckley when Tommy turns down Stanley′s box seats for a baseball game.
24	"The Milking Stool"	Fletcher Markle	Unknown	March 16, 1962
With Kay married, Stanley seemingly busier than ever at his office, and even Tommy having grown up so much, Ellie feels no one needs her any more. Feeling useless, she tells Stanley that she is thinking of getting a job, and decides to go into the antique furniture business. Guest stars: Les Tremayne and June Ellis.
25	"Quibbling"	Fletcher Markle	Mort Green	March 23, 1962
Kay runs home to Ellie after she and Buckley have some basic conflicts. Kay's account of her argument with Buckley does not quite agree with Buckley's and Stanley's efforts to restore peace only succeed in getting him into trouble with Ellie.
26	"The House"	Fletcher Markle	Unknown	March 30, 1962
Stanley does not think it is wise for Kay and Buckley to buy a house, then nearly faints when Ellie tells him Kay is going to have a baby.
27	"The Campaign Manager"	Gene Reynolds	Mort Green	April 6, 1962
Stanley's law partner solicits his aid in campaigning for the Williston maid to be president of an organization.
28	"The Duchess"	Gene Reynolds	Dale & Katherine Eunson	April 13, 1962
Doris thinks she has inherited the title "Duchess of Lianddudnowan" and an island in Wales with a 154-room Norman castle, and she hires Stanley as her attorney to prove her claim. Guest stars: Henry Corden and Henry Beckman.
29	"Stanley's Steamer"	Unknown	Unknown	April 20, 1962
Stanley spends a lot of time with his new toy and is suspected of carrying on with another woman.
30	"The Hospital"	Unknown	Unknown	April 27, 1962
Herbert calmly calls a cab and goes to a hospital without any explanation.
31	"The Band"	Gene Reynolds	Unknown	May 4, 1962
Stanley unwittingly hires Tommy's inexperienced jazz combo to entertain for the big annual lawyer's ball.
32	"Bradley's Shack"	Gene Reynolds	Unknown	May 11, 1962
Ellie gets suspicious when she learns Stanley and his men friends will "rough it" at a plush hunting lodge.
33	"The Hammers"	Gene Reynolds	Unknown	May 18, 1962
House guests turn the Banks residence into a haven for a muscle-building school.
34	"The Visit"	Gene Reynolds	James S. Henerson & Ken Cooper	May 25, 1962
Stanley's co-worker Wilkins reads a quote to Stanley from a book on family relationships by a man named Gelbert which says parents should only visit their married children when specifically invited. When Stanley and Ellie discover that they have inadvertently invited themselves to a dinner party at Kay and Buckley's home and decide that Kay and Buckley are inviting them only to be nice, they bow out of the dinner with a lame excuse to respect Kay and Buckley's independence in accordance with Gelbert′s teachings. Guest star: Robert Lieb.
