= Father of the Bride (1950 film) =

1950 film by Vincente Minnelli

- Theatrical release poster
- Directed by: Vincente Minnelli
- Screenplay by: Frances Goodrich; Albert Hackett
- Based on: Father of the Bride by Edward Streeter
- Produced by: Pandro S. Berman
- Starring: Spencer Tracy; Joan Bennett; Elizabeth Taylor
- Cinematography: John Alton
- Edited by: Ferris Webster
- Music by: Adolph Deutsch
- Production company: Metro-Goldwyn-Mayer
- Distributed by: Loew's, Inc.
- Release dates: May 18, 1950 (New York City); June 16, 1950 (United States)
- Running time: 92 minutes
- Country: United States
- Language: English
- Budget: $1,215,000
- Box office: $6,084,000

Father of the Bride is a 1950 American romantic comedy film directed by Vincente Minnelli from a screenplay by Frances Goodrich and Albert Hackett, based on the 1949 eponymous novel by Edward Streeter. The film stars Spencer Tracy, Joan Bennett, and Elizabeth Taylor, and follows a man trying to cope with preparations for his daughter's wedding. Father of the Bride was nominated for Academy Awards for Best Picture; Best Writing, Screenplay; and Best Actor (for Tracy).

== Plot ==
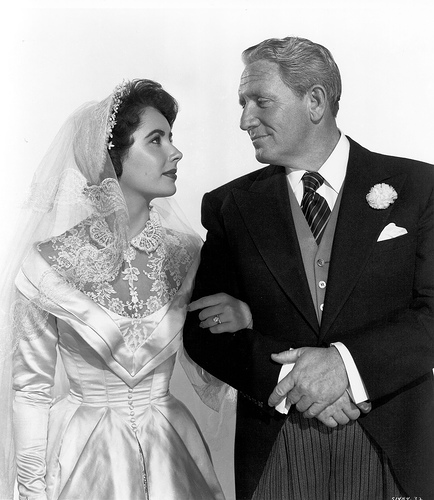
Stanley T. Banks (Spencer Tracy) and Kay Banks (Elizabeth Taylor) in the wedding scene

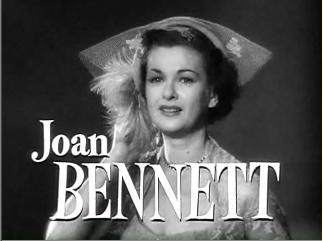
Joan Bennett in the film credits

In the aftermath of the wedding of his daughter Kay, Stanley T. Banks, a successful middle-aged lawyer, recalls the day three months earlier when he first learned of her engagement to Buckley. Kay's casual announcement at the dinner table of the family's comfortable suburban home that she is in love with him and has accepted his proposal makes Stanley feel uneasy, but he soon recognizes that his daughter has grown up and the wedding is inevitable. While Ellie, Kay's mother, immediately begins making preparations, Stanley lies awake at night, fearing the worst for his daughter.

Stanley's misgivings about the marriage eventually make Ellie anxious. Stanley insists that Kay present Buckley for a financial sit-down. She calls the tradition "old-fashioned rigamarole", but produces him nevertheless. After spending the entire time talking about himself, Stanley is pleased to learn later from Ellie that Buckley is the head of his own small company and is indeed capable of providing a comfortable life for Kay. The Bankses' first meeting with Buckley's wealthy parents, Doris and Herbert Dunstan, starts awkwardly, careens animatedly, then tails off when Stanley drinks too much and falls asleep upright on their couch.

Stanley misses out on Kay and Buckley's engagement party, marooned in the kitchen playing bartender. In its wake, he realizes that any hope for a small wedding has been swept aside, and there will be no escaping paying for an extravagant affair "with all the trimmings". As costs for the June event spiral out of control, Stanley calculates that he can afford to accommodate no more than 150 guests. The task of paring down the list proves too difficult for everyone involved, however, and he reluctantly consents to an extra 100. Growing rattled, he suggests to Kay that she and Buckley elope. Kay is initially shocked by the suggestion, but has a change of heart that she shares with her mother. Ellie, who has long mourned never having had the wedding planned for Kay, strongly disapproves. Quick on his feet, Stanley plays it off as if it had been Kay's idea.

Wedding plans continue until Kay calls off the wedding, appalled that Buckley has decided to take her on a fishing trip to Nova Scotia for their honeymoon. However, Kay and Buckley soon reconcile, and the two families begin wedding rehearsals.

On the day of the wedding, chaos ensues at the Banks home during final preparations for the reception. The wedding ceremony brings both joy and sorrow to Stanley, as he concedes that his daughter is now a woman and no longer his child. During the reception, Stanley tries to find Kay so he can kiss the bride but only manages to see her leaving in a spray of confetti. Afterward, Ellie and Stanley survey the mess in their home and concur that the entire affair was a great success. Kay calls and tells her father she loves him and thanks her parents for everything they have done for her. Proud of their success, Stanley and Ellie dance together in their tarnished living room.

== Cast ==
- Spencer Tracy as Stanley T. Banks
- Joan Bennett as Ellie Banks
- Elizabeth Taylor as Kay Banks
- Don Taylor as Buckley Dunstan
- Billie Burke as Doris Dunstan
- Leo G. Carroll as Mr. Massoula, the caterer
- Moroni Olsen as Herbert Dunstan
- Melville Cooper as Mr. Tringle, a church beadle
- Taylor Holmes as Warner
- Paul Harvey as Reverend Galsworthy
- Frank Orth as Joe
- Rusty Tamblyn as Tommy Banks
- Tom Irish as Ben Banks
- Marietta Canty as Delilah

== Production ==
According to Frank Miller for TCM, when creating the role for the father, the character was shaped around Spencer Tracy. Minnelli believed Tracy was capable of handling a role that balanced humor with fatherly tenderness. After some miscommunication with the producers, Jack Benny was brought in for a screen test. He was too comedic and couldn’t handle the dramatic aspects of the film. When Tracy heard another actor was being tested, he turned down the movie. Minnelli asked Katharine Hepburn to invite Tracy to a dinner party where he later convinced Tracy to join the production.

Tracy then wanted Hepburn for his screen wife, but it was felt that they were too romantic a team to play a happily domesticated couple with children, so Joan Bennett, who had previously co-starred with Hepburn in the 1933 film version of Little Women and Tracy in the 1932 motion pictures She Wanted a Millionaire and Me and My Gal, got the part.

== Release ==
The film premiered on May 18, 1950, at Radio City Music Hall in New York City. The premiere of Father of the Bride took place 12 days after Taylor's real-life marriage to her first husband Nicky Hilton, an event that MGM exploited in its publicity campaign for the picture. Helen Rose, who designed Taylor's gown for the film, also designed her wedding gown.

== Reception ==
=== Box office ===
The film was one of the top-grossing films of the year, earning $6,084,000 worldwide ($4,036,000 in the United States and Canada and $2,048,000 overseas), a fivefold return on its $1,215,000 budget. It did so well that MGM registered the title Now I'm a Grandfather and negotiated rights for a sequel with Streeter.

=== Critical response ===
Reviews from critics were generally positive. Bosley Crowther of The New York Times called the film "equally wonderful" when compared to the book, with "all the warmth and poignancy and understanding that makes the Streeter treatise much beloved." Of Tracy's performance Crowther wrote, "As a father, torn by jealousy, devotion, pride and righteous wrath, Mr. Tracy is tops." Variety called it "the second strong comedy in a row for Spencer Tracy," with "plenty to enjoy during the speedy 92 minutes."

Harrison's Reports wrote, "Crammed with laughs, it is a mirthful, warmly appealing entertainment that is sure to be a crowd pleaser." Richard L. Coe of The Washington Post called it "a cheerful package of smiles and laughter. You'll enjoy it." John McCarten of The New Yorker was more dismissive of the film, calling the jokes "rather wheezy, and they certainly don't do much to speed up the picture. Since the plot consists simply of outlining the difficulties of putting on a wedding, including, of course, the damnable expense of it all, it grows a little tiresome after a half hour or so."

On the review aggregator website Rotten Tomatoes, the film holds an approval rating of 90% based on 31 reviews, with an average rating of 7.3/10. The website's critics consensus reads, "With a terrific script, great performances from Spencer Tracy and Elizabeth Taylor, and assured direction from Vincent Minnelli, Father of the Bride endures as a sparkling comedy of its era."

== Sequels and adaptations ==
Pleased with the commercial and critical success of Father of the Bride, MGM rushed a sequel into production the following year, called Father's Little Dividend, in which Taylor's character has a baby. The film was also adapted into a television series of the same name, which aired on CBS during the 1961–62 season and stars Leon Ames (Stan), Ruth Warrick (Ellie), and Myrna Fahey (Kay).

In 1991, a remake of the same name was made starring Steve Martin, Diane Keaton, and Kimberly Williams as the bride. It produced the sequel, Father of the Bride Part II, in 1995, with the same cast. As in the original's sequel, the bride gives birth to her first child, also a son. A plot line added to the sequel is that the bride's mother unexpectedly becomes pregnant, as well. A 3rd film was released in 2020 titled Father of the Bride Part 3(ish). It was a short film. The film was also remade in India in Tamil as Abhiyum Naanum (2008), and in Kannada as Naanu Nanna Kanasu (2010).

A 2nd remake featuring a Hispanic family was released on June 16, 2022, on HBO Max.

== Recognition ==
Father of the Bride was featured in Peter Bogdanovich's 1971 film The Last Picture Show, being screened in the local movie theater.

The film is recognized by American Film Institute in these lists:

- 2000: AFI's 100 Years...100 Laughs – No. 83

== Home media ==
The original negative was destroyed in a fire in 1978, and all home media released have been sourced from a fine grain master positive. The film was released on DVD in June 2004. It was given an extensive digital restoration and released on Blu-ray by the Warner Archive Collection in May 2016.
