= She Wanted a Millionaire =

1932 film

- Directed by: John G. Blystone
- Written by: Sonya Levien; William Anthony McGuire
- Produced by: Sol M. Wurtzel; John W. Considine Jr.
- Starring: Joan Bennett; Spencer Tracy; Una Merkel
- Cinematography: John F. Seitz
- Edited by: Ralph Dixon; Louis Loeffler
- Music by: George Lipschultz
- Production company: Fox Film
- Distributed by: Fox Film
- Release date: February 12, 1932
- Running time: 74 minutes
- Country: United States
- Language: English

She Wanted a Millionaire is a 1932 American pre-Code romantic drama film starring Joan Bennett and Spencer Tracy. The film, produced and distributed by Fox Film Corporation, was directed by John G. Blystone and also features Una Merkel. It is the only film that Bennett and Tracy made together in which she was billed over Tracy. They also played the top-billed romantic leads in Me and My Gal (1932), Father of the Bride (1950), and Father's Little Dividend (1951).

== Cast ==
- Joan Bennett as Jane Miller
- Spencer Tracy as William Kelley
- Una Merkel as Mary Taylor
- James Kirkwood as Roger Norton
- Dorothy Peterson as Mrs. Miller
- Douglas Cosgrove as Mr. Miller
- Don Dillaway as Humphrey
- Tetsu Komai as Charlie
- Constantine Romanoff as Monk
- George Chandler as Hotel Worker
- Lucille La Verne as Mother Norton
- Judith Vosselli as French Society Woman
- Cecilia Parker as Miss Hollywood
- June Lang as Beauty Contest Contestant
- Sheila Bromley as Beauty Contest Contestant
- Janet Chandler as Beauty Contest Contestant
- Peaches Jackson as Beauty Contest Contestant

== Production ==
During filming, Bennett suffered an accident when she fell from a horse. Her recovery lasted several months, delaying the film's completion.

== Release ==
The film had its world premiere at the Newman theater in Kansas City on February 12, 1932. It grossed an indifferent $7,000 in its first week.

== Critical Response ==
"Director John Blystone, the technical departments and a competent cast," said Clara Sawdon, reviewer for International Photographer, "contribute everything possible to make this picture meritorious entertainment, but even such heroic efforts cannot make a story plausible or convincing when it is lacking in such essentials."

== Bibliography ==
- Solomon, Aubrey. The Fox Film Corporation, 1915-1935: A History and Filmography. McFarland, 2011.
