= Moroni Olsen =

American actor (1889–1954)

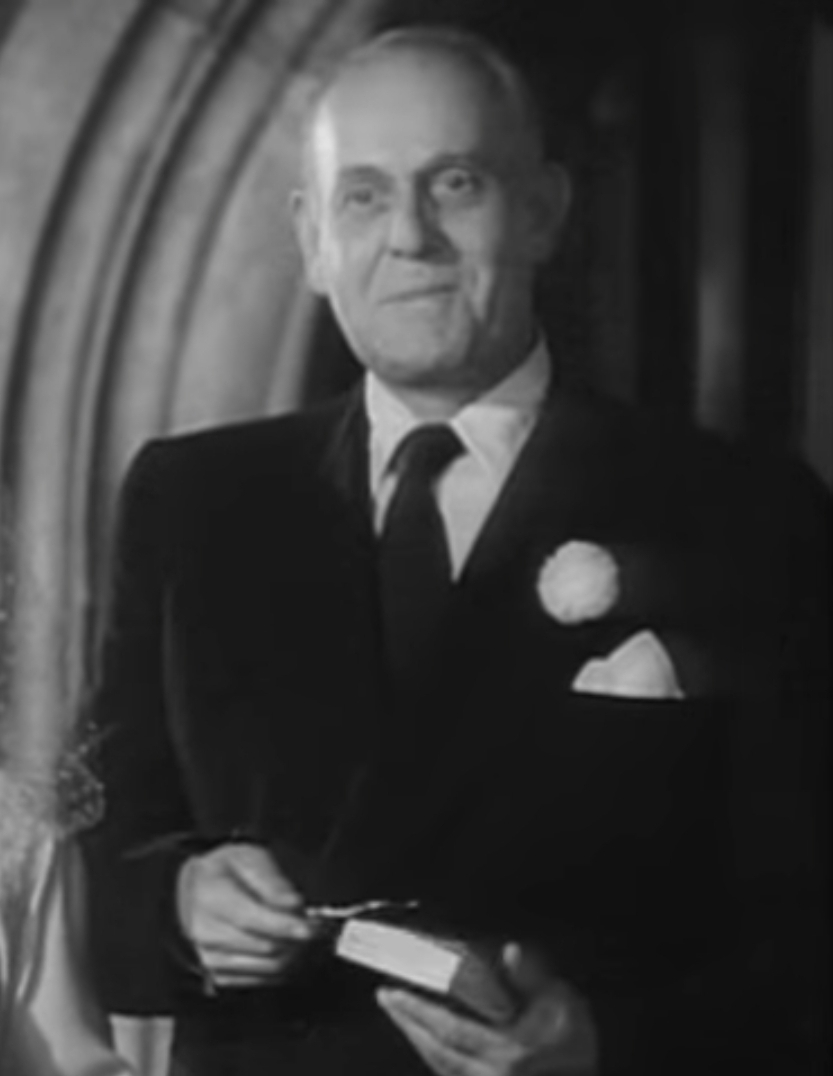
- Olsen in Father's Little Dividend (1951)
- Born: November 22, 1889; Ogden, Utah, U.S.
- Died: November 22, 1954 (aged 65); Los Angeles, California, U.S.
- Occupation: Actor
- Years active: 1919–1954
- Children: Dave Olsen (son) Mary-Kate Olsen (granddaughter) Ashley Olsen (granddaughter) Trent Olsen (grandson) Elizabeth Olsen (granddaughter)

Moroni Olsen (November 22, 1889 – November 22, 1954) was an American actor.

== Early life and education ==
Olsen was born on November 22, 1889, in Ogden, Utah, to Latter-day Saint parents Edward Arenholt Olsen and Martha (née Hoverholst) Olsen, who named him after the Moroni found in the Book of Mormon. His father was Bishop of the Fourth Ward of Ogden.

In 1913 Olsen graduated from the Leland Powers School of Expression in Boston. Olsen studied at Weber Stake Academy, the predecessor of Weber State University. He then went to study at the University of Utah, where one of his teachers was Maud May Babcock. During World War I, he sold war bonds for the United States Navy. He also studied and performed in the eastern United States around this time.

After he had taught dramatic art at Ogden High School, Olsen spent 13 weeks on a Chautauqua tour of Montana, Oregon, and Washington. He and three other actors presented the three-act play Carson of the North Woods as a one-night program at each of the group's stops.

== Career ==
In 1920, he was teaching drama at the Cornish School (later Cornish College of the Arts) in Seattle, Washington.

In 1923, Olsen organized the Moroni Olsen Players, based in Ogden. They performed at both Ogden's Orpheum Theatre and at various other locations spread from Salt Lake City to Seattle.

After working on Broadway, he made his film debut in a 1935 adaptation of The Three Musketeers. He later played a different role in a 1939 comedy version of the story, starring Don Ameche as D'Artagnan and the Ritz Brothers as three dimwitted lackeys who are forced to substitute for the musketeers, who have drunk themselves into a stupor. He appeared in scores of films during his career.

His most famous role was the voice of the Slave in The Magic Mirror in Snow White and the Seven Dwarfs (1937), Walt Disney's first full-length animated feature film. Olsen provided the voice of the senior angel in It's a Wonderful Life. His roles before the camera include a Secret Service officer in Alfred Hitchcock's 1946 film Notorious and the father-in-law of Elizabeth Taylor in the film comedies Father of the Bride (1950) and Father's Little Dividend (1951).

Olsen was an active member of the Church of Jesus Christ of Latter-day Saints, being a teacher of youth in the Hollywood Ward. He also was director of the Pilgrimage Play of Hollywood for several years.

== Death ==
Olsen died in his apartment in Los Angeleson November 22, 1954, of a heart attack right on the date of his 65th birthday. He is buried in the Ogden City Cemetery.

== Broadway roles ==
- Mary of Scotland (1933) as John Knox

== Selected filmography ==
- The Three Musketeers (1935) as Porthos
- Annie Oakley (1935) as William 'Buffalo Bill' Cody
- Seven Keys to Baldpate (1935) as Mayor Jim Cargan
- We're Only Human (1935) as Inspector J.R. Curran
- Yellow Dust (1936) as Missouri
- The Farmer in the Dell (1936) as Chester Hart
- Two in Revolt (1936) as Cyrus Benton
- The Witness Chair (1936) as Lieutenant Poole
- M'Liss (1936) as Jake
- Mary of Scotland (1936) as John Knox
- Grand Jury (1936) as Davis, Taylor's Bodyguard
- Mummy's Boys (1936) as Dr. Edward Sterling
- The Plough and the Stars (1936) as Irish Leader
- The Soldier and the Lady (1937) as Tartar Chief (voice, uncredited)
- The Life of Emile Zola (1937) as Capt. Guignet (uncredited)
- The Last Gangster (1937) as Detective Danny Shea (uncredited)
- Manhattan Merry-Go-Round (1937) as Jonathan (uncredited)
- Adventure's End (1937) as First Mate Rand Husk
- Snow White and the Seven Dwarfs (1937) as Magic Mirror (voice, uncredited)
- Gold Is Where You Find It (1938) as Senator Hearst
- Kidnapped (1938) as Douglas
- Marie Antoinette (1938) as Bearded Leader of the People (uncredited)
- That Certain Age (1938) as Fullerton's Associate (uncredited)
- There Goes My Heart (1938) as Fisherman (uncredited)
- Submarine Patrol (1938) as The Fleet Captain
- Kentucky (1938) as John Dillon – 1938
- Homicide Bureau (1939) as Capt. Haines
- Off the Record (1939) as Juvenal Court Judge
- The Three Musketeers (1939) as Bailiff
- Rose of Washington Square (1939) as Major Buck Russell
- Sons of Liberty (1939, Short) as Robert Morris, Superintendent of Finance (uncredited)
- Code of the Secret Service (1939) as The Friar
- Susannah of the Mounties (1939) as Supt. Andrew Standing
- Dust Be My Destiny (1939) as Slim Jones – Defense Attorney
- Allegheny Uprising (1939) as Calhoon
- That's Right – You're Wrong (1939) as Jonathan Forbes
- Barricade (1939) as Shanghai Managing Editor
- Invisible Stripes (1939) as The Warden
- Brother Rat and a Baby (1940) as Maj. Terry
- Virginia City (1940) as Dr. Robert Cameron
- If I Had My Way (1940) as Mr. Blair
- Brigham Young (1940) as Doc Richards
- East of the River (1940) as Judge R.D. Davis
- Life with Henry (1940) as Sylvanus Q. Sattherwaite
- Santa Fe Trail (1940) as Robert E. Lee
- Three Sons o' Guns (1941) as Philip Talbot
- Dive Bomber (1941) as Senior Surgeon at San Diego
- One Foot in Heaven (1941) as Dr. John Romer
- Dangerously They Live (1941) as Mr. Goodwin
- Nazi Agent (1942) as Brenner
- Sundown Jim (1942) as Andrew Barr
- Ship Ahoy (1942) as Inspector Davis (uncredited)
- My Favorite Spy (1942) as Major Allen
- The Glass Key (1942) as Ralph Henry
- Mrs. Wiggs of the Cabbage Patch (1942) as Dr. Olcott
- Reunion in France (1942) as Paul Grebeau
- Air Force (1943) as Col. Blake
- Mission to Moscow (1943) as Col. Faymonville
- We've Never Been Licked (1943) as Commandant
- Madame Curie (1943) as President of Businessman's Board (uncredited)
- The Song of Bernadette (1943) as Chaplain (uncredited)
- Buffalo Bill (1944) as Sen. Frederici
- Ali Baba and the Forty Thieves (1944) as Caliph Hassan
- Cobra Woman (1944) as MacDonald
- Roger Touhy, Gangster (1944) as Riley
- Thirty Seconds Over Tokyo (1944) as General (uncredited)
- The Valley of Decision (1945) as Richard Kane (uncredited)
- Pride of the Marines (1945) as Capt. Burroughs
- Behind City Lights (1945) as Curtis Holbrook
- Mildred Pierce (1945) as Inspector Peterson
- Week-End at the Waldorf (1945) as House Detective Blake
- Don't Fence Me In (1945) as Henry Bennett, aka Harry Benson
- From This Day Forward (1946) as Tim Bagley (uncredited)
- Night in Paradise (1946) as High Priest
- The Walls Came Tumbling Down (1946) as Bishop Martin
- Boys' Ranch (1946) as Judge Henderson
- Notorious (1946) as Walter Beardsley
- The Strange Woman (1946) as Rev. Thatcher
- It's a Wonderful Life (1946) as Senior Angel (voice, uncredited)
- The Beginning or the End (1947) as Dr. Arthur H. Compton
- The Long Night (1947) as Chief of Police Bob McManus
- Possessed (1947) as Dr. Ames
- Life with Father (1947) as Dr. Humphries
- Black Gold (1947) as Don Toland
- That Hagen Girl (1947) as Trenton Gateley
- High Wall (1947) as Dr. Philip Dunlap
- Call Northside 777 (1948) as Parole Board Chairman
- Up in Central Park (1948) as Big Jim Fitts
- Command Decision (1948) as Congressman Stone
- The Fountainhead (1949) as Chairman
- Task Force (1949) as Adm. Ames
- Samson and Delilah (1949) as Targil
- Father of the Bride (1950) as Herbert Dunstan
- Payment on Demand (1951) as Arnold Barton (uncredited)
- Father's Little Dividend (1951) as Herbert Dunstan
- No Questions Asked (1951) as Henry Manston
- Submarine Command (1951) as Rear Adm. Joshua Rice
- Lone Star (1952) as Sam Houston
- At Sword's Point (1952) as Porthos
- Washington Story (1952) as Speaker of the House
- So This Is Love (1953) as Arnold Reuben (uncredited)
- Marry Me Again (1953) as Mr. Courtney
- The Long, Long Trailer (1954) as Mr. Tewitt
- Sign of the Pagan (1954) as Pope Leo I (posthumous release; final film role)
