= Ferris Webster =

American film editor

- Born: Ferris Maynard Webster; April 29, 1912; Seattle, Washington, U.S.
- Died: February 4, 1989 (aged 76); San Luis Obispo, California, U.S.
- Occupation: Film editor
- Years active: 1939–1982

Ferris Maynard Webster (April 29, 1912 – February 4, 1989) was an American film editor with approximately seventy-two film credits. He was nominated for Academy Awards for Best Film Editing for his work on Blackboard Jungle (1955), The Manchurian Candidate (1962), and The Great Escape (1963).

Webster was raised in the state of Washington, and was a student at the University of Southern California, where he was an outstanding track and field athlete. Webster was an All-American at 880 yards for the USC Trojans track and field team, finishing 4th at the 1933 NCAA Track and Field Championships. He was trained as an editor at the MGM Studios, and received his first feature-film credit in 1943 for Harrigan's Kid. At MGM, Webster edited six films with director Vincente Minnelli: Undercurrent (1946), Madame Bovary (1949), Father of the Bride (1950), Father's Little Dividend (1951), The Long, Long Trailer (1954), and Tea and Sympathy (1956). Film critic Bruce Eder has written of Madame Bovary that, "the cutting of the film in the gala ball sequence, in particular, was a marvel of the editor's art in the service of old Hollywood's restrained, elegant storytelling." In the mid-1950s, he edited three films with director Richard Brooks: Blackboard Jungle (1955), Something of Value (1957), and Cat on a Hot Tin Roof (1958); Webster received his first nomination for the Academy Award for Blackboard Jungle. His last film at MGM was Key Witness (1960).

Bruce Eder has written, "If ever a film editor deserved public recognition in the 1960s, it was Ferris Webster." Webster edited the three films of director John Frankenheimer's "paranoia trilogy": The Manchurian Candidate (1962), Seven Days in May (1964), and Seconds (1966). Eder writes that The Manchurian Candidate was "the editor's magnum opus. The shooting, cutting, and intercutting of one extended brainwashing sequence, seen from multiple points-of-view, is still striking decades later, and the movie earned Webster his second Academy Award nomination." Frankenheimer cast Webster in his only appearance as a film actor, as Air Force Gen. Bernard "Barney" Rutkowski in Seven Days in May.

Webster was nominated for an Academy Award for the editing of The Great Escape (1963), which was directed by John Sturges. Webster and Sturges' notable collaboration included fifteen films between 1950 and 1972, which is about half of Sturges' films in that period. It started with The Magnificent Yankee and Mystery Street (1950), and included The Law and Jake Wade (1958), The Magnificent Seven (1960), and Ice Station Zebra (1968). The final film of their collaboration was Joe Kidd (1972), which was near the end of Sturges' career.

Joe Kidd starred Clint Eastwood. In the last phase of his career, Webster edited and co-edited eight films that were directed by Eastwood, starting with High Plains Drifter (1973), which was Eastwood's second film as a director. Webster edited Breezy (1973), The Eiger Sanction (1975), The Outlaw Josey Wales (1976), The Gauntlet (1977), Bronco Billy (1980), Firefox and Honkytonk Man (both 1982). These latter two films with Eastwood concluded Webster's career as an editor, apparently after a falling-out between the two men. Malpaso staffers believed Clint had been spoiled by Webster’s ability to piece together footage so that the sequence always made sense. Clint the actor was as notorious for doing as few camera takes (usually only a couple) as he was for not repeating his scripted dialogue -- and if they hadn't filmed with multiple cameras running (offering more footage to cutaway to), this time-consuming/unproductive process could wear down a film cutter. Around the time of The Enforcer (1976), Eastwood's (on-camera) anti-post-production idiosyncrasies supposedly became more, and more, time consuming for Webster.

Nevertheless, Webster reportedly had started out "liking" Clint enormously, had spent much of his career working exclusively for the star. He had even moved up near Burney, CA (where Clint purchased a "forever home," in late-1978) thinking he would edit Malpaso films for the rest of his life. ‘He died brokenhearted,’ according to Malpaso producer, Fritz Manes.

Additional credits include The Picture of Dorian Gray (1945), Lili (1953), Forbidden Planet (1956), Les Girls (1957), Divorce American Style (1967).

== Selected filmography ==
Editor
Year	Film	Director	Notes
1943	Harrigan's Kid	Charles Reisner	
1943	Swing Fever	Tim Whelan	
1944	Rationing	Willis Goldbeck	
1945	The Picture of Dorian Gray	Albert Lewin	
1945	Dangerous Partners	Edward L. Cahn	
1946	The Hoodlum Saint	Norman Taurog	First collaboration with Norman Taurog
1946	Undercurrent	Vincente Minnelli	First collaboration with Vincente Minnelli
1947	Living in a Big Way	Gregory La Cava	
1947	If Winter Comes	Victor Saville	
1948	On an Island with You	Richard Thorpe	First collaboration with Richard Thorpe
1948	Words and Music	Norman Taurog	Second collaboration with Norman Taurog
1949	Madame Bovary	Vincente Minnelli	Second collaboration with Vincente Minnelli
1949	The Doctor and the Girl	Curtis Bernhardt	
1950	Please Believe Me	Norman Taurog	Third collaboration with Norman Taurog
1950	Father of the Bride	Vincente Minnelli	Third collaboration with Vincente Minnelli
1950	Mystery Street	John Sturges	First collaboration with John Sturges
1950	Watch the Birdie	Jack Donohue	
1950	The Magnificent Yankee	John Sturges	Second collaboration with John Sturges
1951	Father's Little Dividend	Vincente Minnelli	Fourth collaboration with Vincente Minnelli
1951	Kind Lady	John Sturges	Third collaboration with John Sturges
1952	Lone Star	Vincent Sherman	
1952	The Girl in White	John Sturges	Fourth collaboration with John Sturges
1953	Lili	Charles Walters	First collaboration with Charles Walters
1953	Scandal at Scourie	Jean Negulesco	
1953	All the Brothers Were Valiant	Richard Thorpe	Second collaboration with Richard Thorpe
1954	The Long, Long Trailer	Vincente Minnelli	Fifth collaboration with Vincente Minnelli
1955	Blackboard Jungle	Richard Brooks	First collaboration with Richard Brooks
1955	The Glass Slipper	Charles Walters	Second collaboration with Charles Walters
1956	Ransom!	Alex Segal	
1956	Forbidden Planet	Fred M. Wilcox	
1956	The Fastest Gun Alive	Russell Rouse	
1956	Tea and Sympathy	Vincente Minnelli	Sixth collaboration with Vincente Minnelli
1957	Something of Value	Richard Brooks	Second collaboration with Richard Brooks
1957	Les Girls	George Cukor	
1958	The High Cost of Loving	José Ferrer	
1958	The Law and Jake Wade	John Sturges	Fifth collaboration with John Sturges
1958	Cat on a Hot Tin Roof	Richard Brooks	Third collaboration with Richard Brooks
1959	Green Mansions	Mel Ferrer	
1959	Never So Few	John Sturges	Sixth collaboration with John Sturges
1960	Key Witness	Phil Karlson	
1960	The Magnificent Seven	John Sturges	Seventh collaboration with John Sturges
1961	By Love Possessed	John Sturges	Eighth collaboration with John Sturges
1961	A Thunder of Drums	Joseph M. Newman	
1962	Sergeants 3	John Sturges	Ninth collaboration with John Sturges
1962	The Manchurian Candidate	John Frankenheimer	First collaboration with John Frankenheimer
1963	The Great Escape	John Sturges	Tenth collaboration with John Sturges
1964	Seven Days in May	John Frankenheimer	Second collaboration with John Frankenheimer
1965	The Satan Bug	John Sturges	Eleventh collaboration with John Sturges
1965	The Hallelujah Trail	John Sturges	Twelfth collaboration with John Sturges
1966	Seconds	John Frankenheimer	Third collaboration with John Frankenheimer
1967	Divorce American Style	Bud Yorkin	First collaboration with Bud Yorkin
1967	Hour of the Gun	John Sturges	Thirteenth collaboration with John Sturges
1968	Ice Station Zebra	John Sturges	Fourteenth collaboration with John Sturges
1970	Start the Revolution Without Me	Bud Yorkin	Second collaboration with Bud Yorkin
1970	A Walk in the Spring Rain	Guy Green	
1970	Zig Zag	Richard A. Colla	
1971	Le Mans	Lee H. Katzin	Uncredited
1971	My Old Man's Place	Edwin Sherin	
1971	The Organization	Don Medford	
1972	Joe Kidd	John Sturges	Fifteenth collaboration with John Sturges
1973	High Plains Drifter	Clint Eastwood	First collaboration with Clint Eastwood
1973	Breezy	Clint Eastwood	Second collaboration with Clint Eastwood
1973	Magnum Force	Ted Post	
1974	Thunderbolt and Lightfoot	Michael Cimino	
1975	The Eiger Sanction	Clint Eastwood	Third collaboration with Clint Eastwood
1976	The Outlaw Josey Wales	Clint Eastwood	Fourth collaboration with Clint Eastwood
1976	The Enforcer	James Fargo	First collaboration with James Fargo
1977	The Gauntlet	Clint Eastwood	Fifth collaboration with Clint Eastwood
1978	Every Which Way but Loose	James Fargo	Second collaboration with James Fargo
1979	Escape from Alcatraz	Don Siegel	
1980	Bronco Billy	Clint Eastwood	Sixth collaboration with Clint Eastwood
1980	Any Which Way You Can	Buddy Van Horn	
1982	Firefox	Clint Eastwood	Seventh collaboration with Clint Eastwood
1982	Honkytonk Man	Clint Eastwood	Eighth collaboration with Clint Eastwood

Editorial department
Year	Film	Director	Role	Notes	Other notes
1954	The Student Prince	Richard Thorpe	Editor: Widescreen	Third collaboration with Richard Thorpe	Uncredited
1970	Cannon for Cordoba	Paul Wendkos	Editorial advisor		

Actor
Year	Film	Director	Role	Notes
1964	Seven Days in May	John Frankenheimer	Gen. Bernard 'Barney' Rutkowski	Uncredited

TV series

Editorial department
Year	Title	Role	Notes
1966	The Rat Patrol	Supervising film editor	1 episode

== See also ==
- List of film director and editor collaborations
