= Father of the Bride Part 3(ish) =

- Official logo
- Directed by: Nancy Meyers
- Written by: Nancy Meyers
- Produced by: Adam Nicely
- Starring: Steve Martin; Diane Keaton; Martin Short; Kimberly Williams-Paisley; Kieran Culkin; George Newbern; Alexandra Shipp; Florence Pugh; Ben Platt; Robert De Niro
- Cinematography: Dean Cundey
- Edited by: David Bilow
- Music by: Alan Silvestri
- Production companies: Netflix Original Films; The Meyers/Shyer Company
- Distributed by: Netflix
- Release date: September 25, 2020
- Running time: 24 minutes
- Country: United States
- Language: English

Father of the Bride, Part 3(ish) is a 2020 American romantic comedy short film, presented in the form of screenlife story-telling. Written and directed by Nancy Meyers, the movie serves as a legacy-sequel which takes place chronologically after the events of Father of the Bride Part II. It is the third release in the film series starring Steve Martin in the title role, and is the fifth overall installment in the Father of the Bride franchise.

The plot centers around the Banks family, and depicts how they handled the self-isolation restrictions order during the early days of COVID-19, while also preparing for Matthew's upcoming wedding. The short depicts his unconventional wedding, during the difficult social limitations as a result of the pandemic.

The film was released on September 25, 2020 on Netflix.

== Plot ==
The Banks family is preparing for the upcoming marriage of Matthew "Matty" Banks and his fiancée Rachel. A discussion is organized by Matty since the event was delayed due to the ongoing COVID-19 pandemic. Because they are following the self-isolation restrictions ordered by the U.S. state and government officials, each family member joins the conversation via video conference. Through the conversation, George reminds each family member about sanitization procedures to help keep them from getting sick. While the family discusses the wedding plans, they realize that they do not know how long the pandemic will last, which will keep them from being able to hold the wedding anytime soon.

After the family has Franck Eggelhoffer join the video conference to discuss the plans, Matty surprises everyone with the suggestion that he and Rachel get married right now, despite the circumstances. As the question arises as to how this could be possible, it is revealed that Franck can legally and lawfully wed the couple remotely using his wedding officiating license. The family takes part in the unconventional wedding, rejoicing in the event and Matthew and Rachel's marriage. Anne and Bryan's son, George "Georgie" Banks-MacKenzie sings a rendition of "The Way You Look Tonight" to the newlywed couple. Following the couple's ceremony, the family plans for future get togethers when the medical restrictions have been lifted.

== Cast ==
- Steve Martin as George Stanley Banks
- Diane Keaton as Nina Banks, George's wife
- Martin Short as Franck Eggelhoffer
- Kimberly Williams-Paisley as Anne "Annie" Banks-MacKenzie, George and Nina's first daughter
- Kieran Culkin as Matthew "Matty" Banks, George and Nina's son
- George Newbern as Bryan MacKenzie, Annie's husband
- Alexandra Shipp as Rachel Banks, Matty's wife
- Florence Pugh as Megan Banks, George and Nina's second daughter
- Ben Platt as George "Georgie" Banks-MacKenzie, Annie and Bryan's son
- Robert De Niro as James, Rachel's father

Additionally, Reese Witherspoon appears in an introductory segment which frames the creation of the short film, while encouraging viewers to donate funds to the World Central Kitchen charity.

== Production ==
An official promotional poster that was used during advertising for the short film.

=== Development ===
Following the release of Father of the Bride Part II, it was confirmed in 1996 that initial work had begun on a third installment. Meyers stated at that time, that she and Charles Shyer were writing a story that would see the Banks family "confronting serious problems in their relationship – but ending up with a stronger bond than ever." In June 2014, rumors arose regarding the plot including a gay wedding for Matty Banks, but Steve Martin denied these rumors. By February 2016, Martin cast doubt on the realization of a third installment stating that while he would like to play the grandfather role, he didn't know if it would actually be made. By October 2017, George Newbern confirmed that a script was being written, expressing excitement for the story that was being developed. In July 2018, Kimberly Williams-Paisley expressed interest in reprising her role should the third movie be realized.

By April 2019 CEO of The Walt Disney Company, Bob Iger announced among other projects that a relaunch of the franchise was in development for Disney+. In 2020, Meyers stated that she had been working on pre-production of a project leading up to the restrictions on filmmaking as a result of the COVID-19 pandemic, though she could not state what the project was at that time. During the pandemic, Meyers grew weary of the future and went to the store to purchase supplies prior to the self-isolation order by U.S. and state officials. Meyers stated that she became very concerned and worried about how the virus would impact the lives of her children in the years that would follow. As she forwarded every news article about the virus to her children, she eventually began to wonder how George Stanley Banks would react to conditions such as these. After decades of remaining in development hell, she officially began work on the next installment. The filmmaker began to wonder what each of the beloved characters had been up to for the last twenty-five years, and after sending an email to Steve Martin stating that she wanted to make a Part III short film that would also serve as a fundraiser for those who did not have the food supplies during the ongoing pandemic, he stated that he would join the cast. This was followed by each of the respective returning cast members, with casting for the roles of Megan Banks and George Banks-MacKenzie thereafter, now chronologically adults.

=== Writing ===
In preparation for the script, Meyers rewatched Father of the Bride and Part II and created some notes. She stated that all of the worries and anxieties she had about the world at that time, she put into her writing for George Banks; a character she describes as a "self-admitted overreactor". The filmmaker stated that as she worked on the project, she found happiness and excitement that she hadn't felt in a while due to the ongoing worldwide circumstances. Meyers had each of the cast members show her the rooms of their homes via Zoom, to choose a setting that she felt fit the character; while Culkin was sent a green screen to place behind him so that his New York backdrop could be changed to Los Angeles. Initially ordering various sweats to be mailed to Martin, the pair decided none of them matched the character exactly the way they wanted. When they chose an option from his personal collection, she decided to have the actors go through the clothes in their personal closets to choose the wardrobe for each character.

=== Filming ===
Principal photography commenced in July 2020, and was conducted remotely with each actor filming their scenes in predetermined rooms of their personal homes. The production crew had previously sent a box filled with equipment for each of the actors to set up; with technology for cinematography, lighting, and sound. Meyers would direct each of the actors from her remote location through her laptop, with the use of Zoom. With ten cameras rolling through the entire production span, the cast followed her direction and the guidance of cinematographer Dean Cundey, through the use of their computers and iPhones. Though the cast couldn't always see the additional actors through their video feed, they could audibly hear each other. Filming lasted for four days. The director stated that at various times, the video for each actor would become blurry but through the use of various takes, they were able to get the scenes she needed to complete the short. Additionally, while each of them didn't have the usual hair and makeup team, nor the production crew present during filming, she was impressed with their abilities to follow directions and bring together the project she had hoped to realize; stating: "It all felt a bit like those old films where everyone in town helps put on a show, except these were movie stars, and I could not have been more grateful for their efforts."

=== Post-production ===
Meyers stated that bringing the resources together into the cohesive story she had written proved to be a unique experience for her. She worked with the film's editor David Bilow, to compile the useable footage and captured audio, with enough footage for a standard short film. Together the production team continued to work remotely, sharing their screens through a number of programs available to do so. The filmmaker later explained that though production was difficult, the entire team had fun during the process: "Even though we were never in the same room or even the same time zone, the camaraderie was still there. When it was over, it felt like all movies feel when shooting ends — a little sad. For me, I guess I always do need a project. This one, with its positive themes and love of family, made me feel whole at a time when I needed it most. And if our efforts lead to a little relief for someone else, then it was a summer well spent."

== Marketing ==
On September 10, 2020, writer/director Nancy Meyers shared the first official marketing tease for the project on her social media with a photograph of Anne and George from the first film. The filmmaker placed the first official synopsis, with the caption: "If he thought a wedding was a lot, how would he react to 2020? Coming soon to a phone in your hand!"

By September 22, Netflix released a teaser clip which was depicted as a real-time screen sequence from the computer of George Banks, as he accepts an upcoming video conference with his family as set up by Matthew "Matty" Banks. In the teaser, the release date was officially announced. On September 24 of the same year, a second trailer was released consisting of archive footage from the previous two installments. The final shot of the clip shows an exterior shot of the Banks home, where Nina shouts through the house asking George to hurry and join the video conference; while George states he will join imminently after washing his hands once more.

== Release ==
Father of the Bride Part 3(ish) was released on September 25, 2020. The short film was distributed by Netflix, through the streaming company's YouTube and Facebook channels. Though the short was released free of charge, a short video introduction segment encouraged its viewers to donate money with all funds going towards the World Central Kitchen non-profit organization.

== Reception ==
The short film was met with a mixed critical response. Although some called the movie "derivative", "weird", "hackneyed", "corny", and "contrived"; praise called the short film: "emotional", "charming", "touching", and "nostalgic". Additional praise was directed at its returning cast as well as its use of big-name cameo appearances, purposeful fan-servicing to Father of the Bride fans, and what they perceived as the filmmaker's role in bringing some comfort into the homes of its viewers at a time of uncertainty. Tabloids also commended the productions contributions to providing meals for children and families impacted by the then-ongoing coronavirus. Vulture, stated that short released by Meyers shouldn't be dismissed and called the filmmaker the "Queen of the Quarantine", after she previously developed and took part in a virtual cast reunion fundraiser for The Parent Trap (1998).

== Potential future ==
Following the release of Father of the Bride Part 3(ish), various sources expressed hopes that an eventual feature length follow-up/adaptation would be developed. Though Walt Disney Pictures is continuing to work on a feature film for Disney+, it is not clear whether it will be a continuation or standalone movie. In September 2020, Williams-Paisley confirmed that there are ongoing conversations with the involvement of Nancy Meyers for a follow-up feature film.
