= Identity Theft (film) =

2004 television film

Identity Theft: The Michelle Brown Story, later renamed Identity Theft, is a crime-drama television film starring Kimberly Williams-Paisley, Annabella Sciorra and John Kapelos. It is based on a true story. The film premiered on the Lifetime television network in 2004.

== Plot ==
Michelle Brown (Paisley) is a young woman who buys her first house and has an excellent credit history. As she submits the paperwork to the mortgage lender, one of the employees, Connie Volkos (Sciorra), uses Michelle's credit card number, social security number and address to purchase numerous items, including electronics and other luxuries. Eventually, this gets out of hand to the point that Michelle begins to suspect her identity has been stolen after receiving bills for items she had not paid for. Connie flees her apartment and travels through the country, dying her hair brown and obtaining a false driver license in Michelle's name. After reaching a different state she purchases her own apartment.

Within a matter of months, Connie is arrested for attempting to deliver marijuana and flees the jurisdiction after her brother puts up her bail. Coincidentally, Michelle has traveled to the southern United States to observe another school and their teaching methods, but because Connie is still using Michelle's name, Michelle is arrested and detained at an airport. She is later released after Ray explains her predicament.

Connie is later arrested and is sentenced to two years in prison for her crimes. Because of the lack of regulations against identity theft at the time, she does not face as severe of charges as an identity thief today would. Yet, this case caused reforms in United States laws to increase regulations against identity theft.

== Cast ==
- Kimberly Williams-Paisley as Michelle Brown
- Jason London as Justin
- Annabella Sciorra as Connie Volkos
