= Father of the Bride (1991 film) =

1991 film directed by Charles Shyer

- Theatrical release poster
- Directed by: Charles Shyer
- Screenplay by: Frances Goodrich; Albert Hackett; Nancy Meyers; Charles Shyer
- Based on: Father of the Bride 1950 film by Frances Goodrich Albert Hackett; Father of the Bride 1949 novel by Edward Streeter
- Produced by: Carol Baum; Nancy Meyers; Howard Rosenman
- Starring: Steve Martin; Diane Keaton; Kimberly Williams; Martin Short
- Cinematography: John Lindley
- Edited by: Richard Marks
- Music by: Alan Silvestri
- Production companies: Touchstone Pictures; Sandollar Productions
- Distributed by: Buena Vista Pictures Distribution
- Release date: December 20, 1991
- Running time: 105 minutes
- Country: United States
- Language: English
- Budget: $20 million
- Box office: $129 million

Father of the Bride is a 1991 American romantic comedy film starring Steve Martin, Diane Keaton, Kimberly Williams (in her film debut), Kieran Culkin, and Martin Short. It is a remake of the 1950 initial film.

Martin portrays George Banks, a businessman who becomes flustered while he and his family prepare for his daughter's marriage.

The film opened to positive reviews, and became a box office success. A sequel, Father of the Bride Part II, was released in 1995. This was Nancy Meyers and Keaton's second of five films together, the first being Baby Boom (1987); the others were Father of the Bride Part II, Something's Gotta Give (2003) and Father of the Bride Part 3(ish) (2020).

== Plot ==
George Banks is sitting in his house right after the wedding reception of his 22-year-old daughter, Annie. He then narrates the events that lead up to Annie’s wedding. George lives in San Marino, California, with his wife, Nina, and their much younger son, Matty, and is the owner of a successful athletic shoe company called Side Kicks.

Annie, freshly graduated from college, returns home after travelling around Europe. She announces that she is engaged to Bryan MacKenzie, despite them only having known each other for three months. The sudden shock turns the warm reunion into a heated argument between her and George, but they quickly reconcile in time for Bryan to arrive and meet them. Despite his good financial status and likable demeanor, George takes an immediate dislike to him, while Nina accepts him as a potential son-in-law. George does not want to let go of Annie.

George and Nina meet Bryan's parents, John and Joanna MacKenzie, who are wealthy and live in a mansion in Bel Air. John reassures George by also expressing how shocked he had initially been at Bryan's engagement and the two couples find they get along well, but George quickly gets into trouble when he begins nosing around the MacKenzies' financial records. He eventually ends up falling into their pool when cornered by their aggressive pet Dobermans.

All is forgiven, however, and the Banks family meets with an eccentric European wedding coordinator named Franck Eggelhoffer. He sneers dismissively at George's complaints about the price of wedding items. George becomes frustrated as Annie and Nina plan for extravagant items such as a flock of swans and alterations to the family home, where the reception is to be held.

When George discovers the wedding as planned will cost $250 a head, he insists on cutting down the guest list, but soon discovers his complaints are taking away from Annie's happiness, so decides to go with the flow. This only lasts briefly, though, and he finally snaps when he damages his old tuxedo. George leaves the house to cool off, but ends up causing a disturbance at the supermarket and is arrested. Nina arrives to bail him out of jail on the condition that he stop ruining the wedding.

With help from Nina and Franck, George becomes more relaxed and accepts that the wedding will be expensive. Annie suddenly calls it off after an argument with Bryan over a gift he gave her – a blender, which she took to mean he expects her to be a compliant housewife. George takes Bryan out for a drink intending to be rid of him, but seeing how despondent he is at the thought of losing Annie, consoles him and convinces him to reconcile with her.

A freak snowstorm arrives the night before the wedding, but Franck and George manage to pull everything together at the last minute. Annie marries Bryan wearing sneakers especially made by George's company, and George walks her down the aisle, finally accepting she has grown up. The reception at the Banks family home goes well thanks to George managing several crises behind the scenes, but as a result, he misses most of it and is unable to say goodbye to Annie before she and Bryan leave for their honeymoon in Hawaii.

The film picks up George's narration from the beginning as the reception ends. Annie calls him from the airport to thank him and tell him that she loves him one last time before they board the plane. With the house now empty and the wedding finished, George finds solace with Nina and dances with her.

== Cast ==
- Steve Martin as George Stanley Banks
- Diane Keaton as Nina Banks, George's wife
- Martin Short as Franck Eggelhoffer
- Kimberly Williams as Annie Banks, George & Nina's daughter
  - Amy Young as 12-year-old Annie
  - Sarah Rose Karr as 7-year-old Annie
  - Marissa Lefton as 3-year-old Annie
- George Newbern as Bryan MacKenzie, the groom
- Kieran Culkin as Matty Banks, George & Nina's son
- BD Wong as Howard Weinstein, Franck's assistant
- Peter Michael Goetz as John MacKenzie, Bryan's father
- Kate McGregor-Stewart as Joanna MacKenzie, Bryan's mother
- Richard Portnow as Al
- David Pasquesi as Hanck
- Chauncey Leopardi as Cameron
- Ira Heiden as Supermarket Stock Boy
- Eugene Levy as Singer at audition
- Tom Irish as Ben Banks, George's father

== Production ==
Dolly Parton's production company Sandollar Productions purchased the remake rights from Turner Entertainment for $100,000 following negotiations by producer Howard Rosenman. Actress Cindy Williams was Sandollar's producing partner. TriStar Pictures were to distribute the film. Sandollar and TriStar planned to make the film as a vehicle for Jack Nicholson, who would play a grown-up member of the counterculture now entrenched in the middle class. However, Turner still wanted television broadcast rights so TriStar withdrew. Sandollar approached Disney's Touchstone Pictures who tapped the studio's finance partner, Touchwood Pacific Partners, to fund the production of the film. Turner accepted a cable television deal. It was Steve Martin, a fan of their previous film Baby Boom (1987), who brought director Charles Shyer and his wife Nancy Meyers on board. According to Shyer, Martin already had a screenplay that he "didn’t love" and Shyer found "awful." The couple significantly rewrote the screenplay with Martin and Diane Keaton in their mind.

=== Music ===
The film's soundtrack, released by Varèse Sarabande on December 12, 1991 in the United States, was composed, conducted and produced by Alan Silvestri and was influenced by jazz and Christmas instrumentations. Apart from his original music, Father of the Bride also makes use of several pop songs, including "My Girl" by The Temptations, "(Today I Met) The Boy I'm Going to Marry" by Darlene Love and "Chapel of Love" by The Dixie Cups.

==== Track listing ====
Father of the Bride track listing
No.	Title	Length
1.	"Main Title"	2:29
2.	"Annie's Theme"	0:48
3.	"Drive to Brunch"	1:44
4.	"Snooping Around"	0:37
5.	"Pool Cue"	1:03
6.	"$250 a Head"	0:24
7.	"Annie Asleep"	0:51
8.	"Basketball Kiss"	1:22
9.	"The Wedding"	0:49
10.	"Snow Scene"	1:32
11.	"Nina at the Stairs"	0:41
12.	"The Big Day"	1:12
13.	"Annie at the Mirror"	1:09
14.	"Pachelbel's Canon"	4:46
15.	"The Way You Look Tonight" (performed by Steve Tyrell)	3:06
16.	"My Annie's Gone"	1:19
17.	"The Way You Look Tonight (Reprise)"	1:59
18.	"End Credit"	3:28
Total length:		29:54

== Reception ==
=== Box office ===
In the United States, Father of the Bride came in second to Hook at the box office during its first week, earning $15 million. It grossed $89.3 million in the United States and Canada and $40 million internationally, for a worldwide gross of $129 million.

=== Critical response ===
Rotten Tomatoes reported that 71% of critics gave Father of the Bride a positive review, based on 45 reviews. The site's critics consensus reads: "While it doesn't quite hit the heights of the original, this remake of the 1950 classic is pleasantly enjoyable, thanks in large part to winning performances from Steve Martin and Martin Short." At Metacritic the film has a weighted average score of 51 out of 100, based on 17 critics, indicating "mixed or average" reviews. Audiences polled by CinemaScore gave the film an average grade of "A−" on an A+ to F scale.

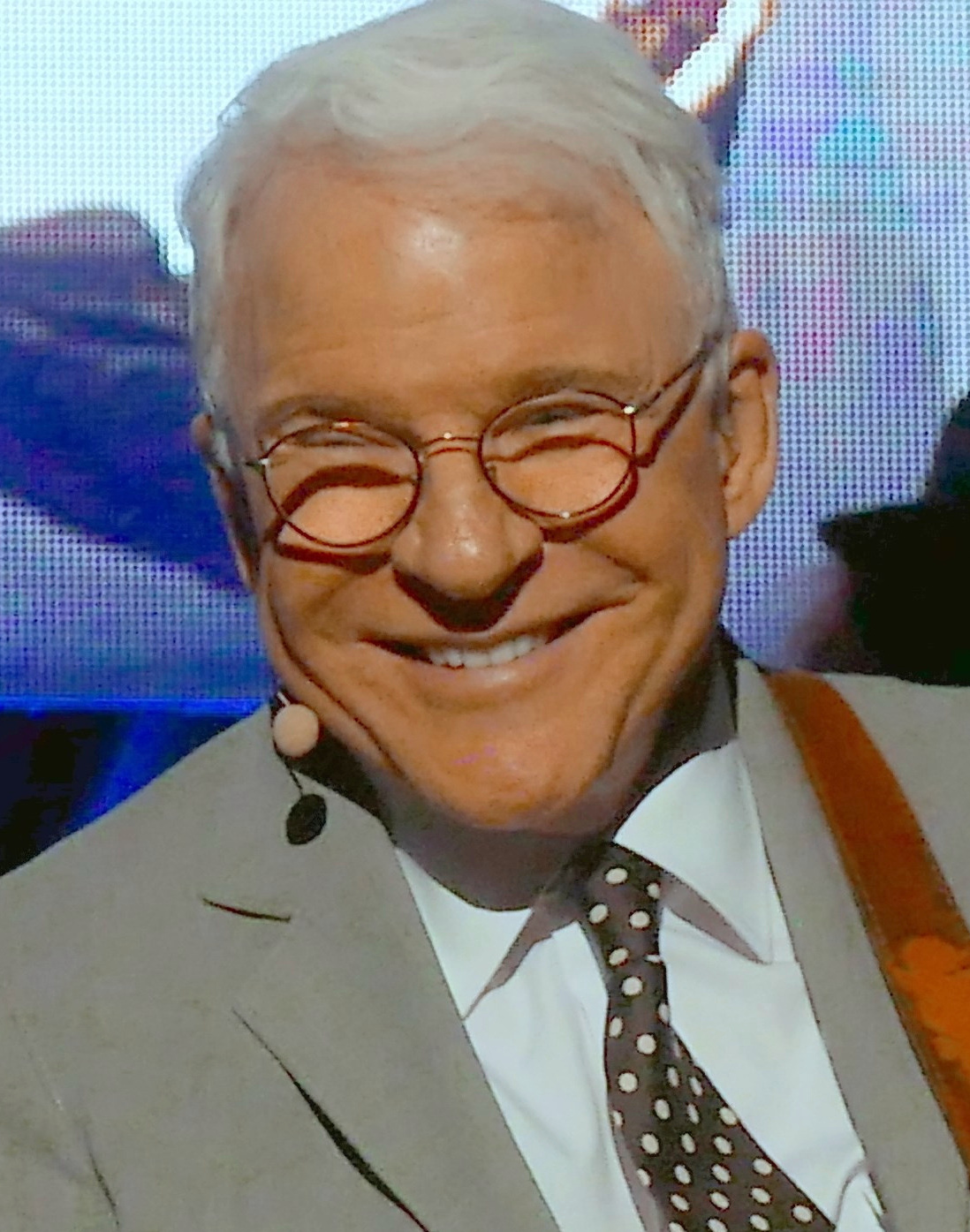
Martin received generally positive reviews for his performance in the film.

Roger Ebert of the Chicago Sun-Times gave the film three stars out of four and called it "one of the movies with a lot of smiles and laughter in it, and a good feeling all the way through." Desson Howe of The Washington Post praised Martin for his performance in it, writing that "it is so funny, it's almost sublime. The explanation is simple: It's all Steve Martin," while his colleague Hal Hinson called the film "a pleasing, well-crafted, surprisingly satisfying diversion. It's eager to entertain and has a quality that's genuinely rare these days, a spirit of gentle modesty." New York Times critic Janet Maslin wrote that "the material has been successfully refurbished with new jokes and new attitudes, but the earlier film's most memorable moments have been preserved."

Variety noted that the film "bears little resemblance to the original" and "gets by more on physical shtick than verbal sparkle." The magazine found that "best stuff here comes straight from Martin, such as his frenzied antics in the in-laws’ house or his ridiculous Tom Jones imitation in front of a mirror in a too-tight tuxedo. A radiant Diane Keaton gives him first-rate support." Empire's Jo Berry found while Father of the Bride was a "pale imitation of the original," they conclude "The film does work, but not quite as well as the Hepburn-Tracy (sic) classic that it seeks to replace. Mildly amusing." (Katharine Hepburn does not appear in the original film.)

Owen Gleiberman, writing for Entertainment Weekly, called the film a "pat, amiable, and rather dawdling farce." He found that "Shyer works hard to keep things light" on what Gleiberman considered "little more than a domestic screwball sitcom." The Hollywood Reporter's Henry Sheehan felt that "the film's sole dramatic preoccupations are with broad physical comedy and unrealistically offbeat characterizations; a few moments of nominal pathos are really just structural pauses in the joke series." Richard Corliss from Time magazine wrote: "Neither the ’90s nor the husband-wife team of Nancy Meyers and Charles Shyer can match the original film’s grace or wit. The humor is sometimes gross, often wan."

=== Accolades ===
Accolades received by Father of the Bride
Award	Date of ceremony	Category	Recipient(s)	Result	Ref.
American Comedy Awards	February 2, 1992	Funniest Supporting Actor in a Motion Picture	Martin Short	Nominated	
BMI Film & TV Awards	May 3, 1992	Film Music Award	Alan Silvestri	Won	
Chicago Film Critics Association Awards	March 5, 1992	Most Promising Actress	Kimberly Williams	Nominated	
MTV Movie Awards	June 10, 1992	Best Breakthrough Performance	Kimberly Williams	Nominated	
MTV Movie Awards	June 10, 1992	Best Comedic Performance	Steve Martin	Nominated	
Young Artist Awards	January 16, 1993	Best Young Actor Co-Starring in a Motion Picture	Kieran Culkin	Nominated	

== Remake ==
On February 21, 2018, The Hollywood Reporter revealed that remakes of several films are in development as exclusive content for The Walt Disney Company's streaming service Disney+ with one of those projects named in the announcement as Father of the Bride.

On September 24, 2020, Warner Bros. announced a remake starring a Hispanic family, with the script being penned by Matt Lopez; the film released on June 16, 2022.
