= Father of the Bride (2022 film) =

2022 film by Gaz Alazraki

- Official release poster
- Directed by: Gaz Alazraki
- Screenplay by: Matt Lopez
- Based on: Father of the Bride; 1949 novel by Edward Streeter
- Produced by: Dede Gardner; Jeremy Kleiner; Paul Michael Perez
- Starring: Andy García; Gloria Estefan; Adria Arjona; Isabela Merced; Diego Boneta; Chloe Fineman
- Cinematography: Igor Jadue-Lillo
- Edited by: Jon Poll
- Music by: Terence Blanchard
- Production company: Plan B Entertainment
- Distributed by: Warner Bros. Pictures; HBO Max
- Release date: June 16, 2022
- Running time: 118 minutes
- Country: United States
- Language: English/Spanish

Father of the Bride is a 2022 American romantic comedy film directed by Gaz Alazraki and written by Matt Lopez, based on the 1949 novel of the same name by Edward Streeter. It serves as a reimagining of the titular 1950 and 1991 movies, and the sixth overall installment in the Father of the Bride franchise. The film stars Andy García, Gloria Estefan, Adria Arjona, Isabela Merced, Diego Boneta, and Chloe Fineman. It is the third filmed version of the story, after the original 1950 film and the 1991 remake. Produced by Plan B Entertainment, it was released on June 16, 2022, on HBO Max.

== Plot ==
Renowned architect Guillermo "Billy" Herrera and his wife Ingrid are a Miami-based Cuban-American couple with two daughters, recent law school graduate Sofia, and rebellious aspiring fashion designer Cora.

At couples' counseling, Ingrid tells Billy that she has had enough of his workaholic attitude and stubbornness so wants a divorce; their counselor advises them to tell their daughters right away. Ingrid plans to announce it later that day after Sofia arrives for a visit, but Sofia first announces her engagement to fellow lawyer Adan Castillo and that they want to marry in one month.

So, Billy and Ingrid agree to keep their divorce a secret until after the wedding. He is hesitant about Sofia's nuptials and her desire to move to Mexico with Adan to work at a non-profit instead of remaining in the United States.

Billy disagrees with the couple as he wants a big, traditional Cuban wedding while Sofia and Adan want a smaller ceremony. Meanwhile, Sofia asks Cora to make her wedding gown and her bridesmaids' dresses, disgruntling their eccentric wedding planner Natalie Vance.

Adan's wealthy father Hernan and the rest of his family arrive in Miami. He and Billy disagree further on the cost and scale of the wedding; Hernan offends him by offering to pay for whatever Billy cannot afford. He then throws a lavish engagement party on his yacht instead.

Hernan has also obtained a lavish mansion on a Miami island and offers to host the wedding there, causing a shouting match between him and Billy, who admits his dislike of Adan and his family. Billy appeases Sofia at her dress fitting and confides the divorce to Adan at the latter's bachelor party.

A storm warning threatens the upcoming ceremony. The families proceed to the wedding rehearsal, where Cora overhears Billy talking about the divorce to his cousin Junior and immediately breaks the news to the rest of the guests. Sofia is appalled that her parents and Adan have been hiding it from her, but reconciles once more with her father and agrees to push through with the wedding. That stormy night, the Herrera family spends the night together.

The next day, the weather has cleared, but the storm has collapsed the only bridge to the wedding venue and has destroyed much of the set-up. The Herreras and Castillos pool their resources to throw the wedding last-minute at the Herrera home, with Natalie officiating. Sofia and Adan marry with Billy's full approval, while he and Ingrid rekindle their romance.

== Cast ==
- Andy García as Billy Herrera
- Gloria Estefan as Ingrid Herrera
  - Emily Estefan as young Ingrid Herrera
- Adria Arjona as Sofia Herrera
- Isabela Merced as Cora Herrera
- Diego Boneta as Adan Castillo
- Chloe Fineman as Natalie Vance
- Ana Fabrega as Vanessa
- Enrique Murciano as Junior Herrera
- Laura Harring as Marcela Castillo
- Ruben Rabasa as Tio Walter
- Pedro Damián as Hernan Castillo
- Matt Walsh as Dr. Gary Saeger
- Macarena Achaga as Julieta Castiilo
- Casey Thomas Brown as Kyler
- Marta Velasco as Caridad "Chi Chi" Gonzalez
- Sean Patrick Dawson as Junior Herrera Jr.
- Ho-Kwan Tse as Huan
- Angela Alvarez as Tia Pili
- Ricardo Burgos as Luisito

== Production ==
In September 2020, it was announced that a Latin adaptation of Father of the Bride centred around Cuban-Americans was in development at Warner Bros. Pictures with a script written by Matt Lopez. In February 2021, it was announced that Gaz Alazraki has been set to direct the film. In March 2021, Andy Garcia was announced to star as the titular character. In April 2021, Adria Arjona, Gloria Estefan, Isabela Merced were cast, with Diego Boneta, Enrique Murciano and Macarena Achaga joining the film in May. In June 2021, Chloe Fineman and Ana Fabrega joined the cast of the film, with the film now being produced by Warner Bros. Pictures and released on HBO Max.

Principal photography began on June 22, 2021, in Atlanta, Georgia.

== Reception ==
On the review aggregator website Rotten Tomatoes, 80% of 55 critics' reviews are positive, with an average rating of 6.6/10. The website's consensus reads: "This Father of the Bride is far from the first to take a trip down the aisle, but it smartly diverges from its predecessors while reaffirming the story's timeless charm." Metacritic, which uses a weighted average, assigned the film a score of 65 out of 100, based on 13 critics, indicating "generally favorable" reviews.
