= Father of the Bride (novel) =

1949 novel by Edward Streeter

- 1949 Book Club Edition
- Author: Edward Streeter
- Illustrator: Gluyas Williams
- Language: English
- Publisher: Simon and Schuster
- Publication date: 1949
- Publication place: United States
- Media type: Book
- Pages: 234
- ISBN: 9781476799292
- OCLC: 290368
- Dewey Decimal: 813.52
- LC Class: PS3537.T828

Father of the Bride is a novel by American author Edward Streeter, first published in 1949. The book humorously explores the trials and tribulations of a father coming to terms with his daughter's impending wedding.

== Synopsis ==
Stanley Banks, a middle-class suburban father, believes that weddings are simple affairs—two people fall in love and get married. However, his world is turned upside down when his daughter, Kay, announces her engagement to Buckley Dunstan. As the wedding preparations begin, Stanley finds himself overwhelmed by the mounting costs, chaotic planning, and shifting family dynamics. While his wife, Ellie, and Kay are swept up in the excitement, Stanley struggles to maintain control, feeling increasingly sidelined and nostalgic about his daughter's childhood. Through a series of comedic misadventures and emotional realizations, he ultimately comes to accept the inevitable changes in his family.

== Adaptations ==
The novel's popularity led to several adaptations:

- 1950 film - starring Spencer Tracy as Stanley Banks and Elizabeth Taylor as Kay. The film was a commercial success. A successful sequel, Father's Little Dividend, was released in 1951.
- 1991 film - starring Steve Martin as George Stanley Banks, Diane Keaton as Nina, and Kimberly Williams as Annie. The film was also successful and spawned a sequel, Father of the Bride Part II (1995).
- 2022 film - A modern re-imagining of Father of the Bride, featuring a Cuban-American family, starring Andy García and Gloria Estefan.
