= George Newbern =

American actor

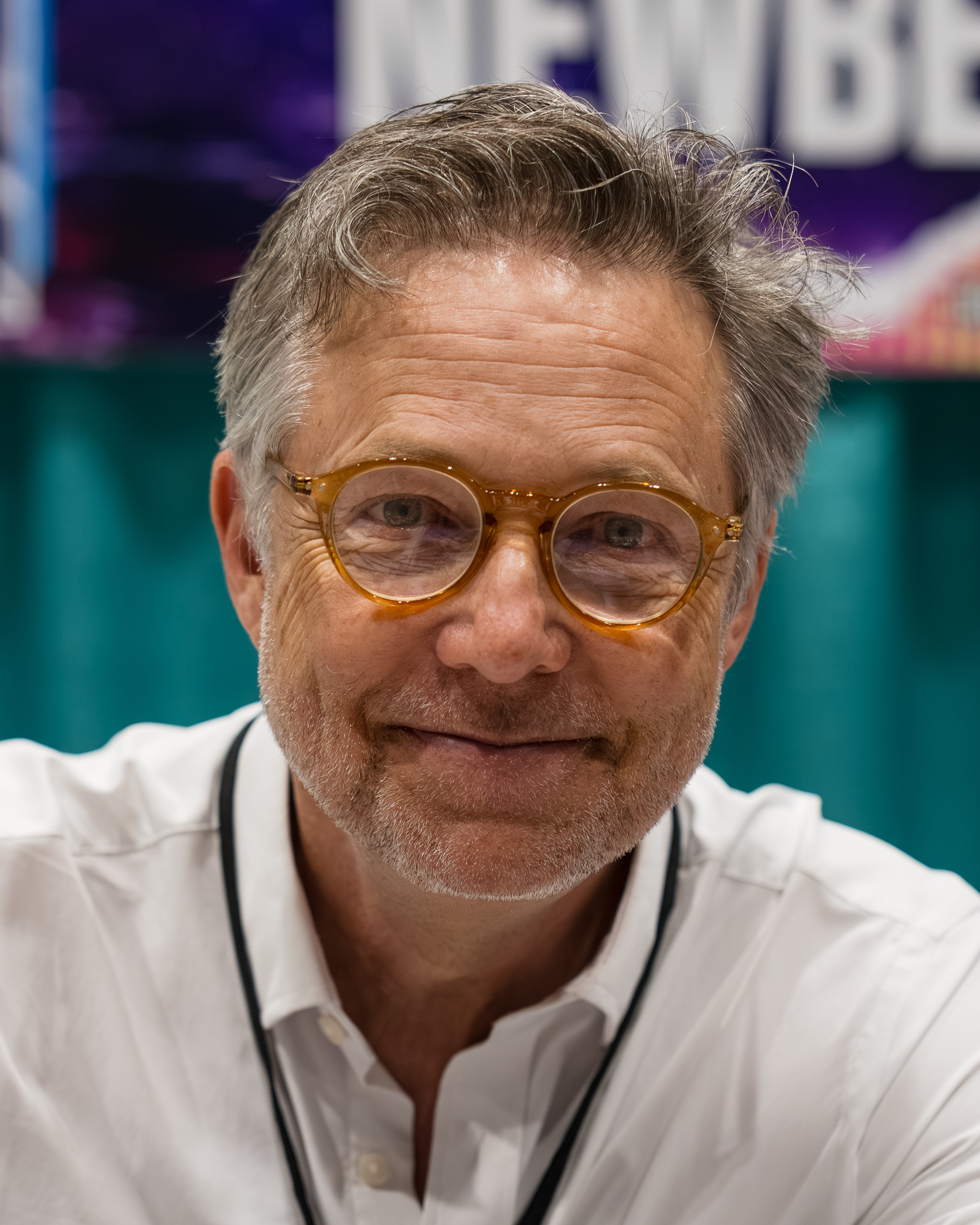
- Newbern at GalaxyCon Oklahoma City in May 2026
- Born: December 30, 1964 (age 61); North Little Rock, Arkansas, U.S.
- Occupation: Actor
- Years active: 1976–present
- Spouse: Marietta DePrima (m. 1990)
- Children: 3

George Newbern (born December 30, 1964) is an American actor, best known for his roles as Charlie in the ABC show Scandal (2012–2018) and Bryan MacKenzie in Father of the Bride (1991) and its sequels Father of the Bride Part II (1995) and Father of the Bride Part 3(ish) (2020). He guest starred as Danny (The Yeti) in Friends and had a recurring role as Julia's son Payne in Designing Women.

Newbern is also known for his long-running role as the voice of Superman in various DC media starting with the animated series Justice League, as well as the voice of Sephiroth in the Final Fantasy series and the Kingdom Hearts series.

== Early life ==
Having grown up in North Little Rock, Arkansas, George Newbern is the son of Betty, a Spanish teacher, and David Newbern, a radiologist. Newbern has two brothers (Gordon and John) and one sister (Murry).

== Career ==
=== Film and television ===
He began his acting career at the Arkansas Arts Center in Little Rock, in the role of the younger brother in Life with Father, based on Clarence S. Day Jr.'s autobiographical novels, at age 12 in 1976. This first acting role spurred him on to other acting roles and eventually on to film roles. Newbern's first lead role was in 1987's Double Switch, a retelling of The Prince and the Pauper that aired as a part of the Wonderful World of Disney television series.

From 1986 to 1992, Newbern had a recurring role as Payne McIlroy, the son of designer Julia Sugarbaker (played by Dixie Carter), on the series Designing Women. He has since guest-starred on television in such series as Providence, Chicago Hope, Friends, Bull, CSI, Medium, Ghost Whisperer, Touched by an Angel, Criminal Minds, and Private Practice. He had a recurring role for several seasons as a former CIA operative in Scandal.

He starred as Neal Morris, father of Melissa Morris (Emily Osment), in the 2009 Disney Channel film Dadnapped, and portrayed Apollo 14 astronaut Stu Roosa in the HBO mini-series From The Earth To The Moon. Film credits include Adventures in Babysitting (1987) with Elisabeth Shue; Double Switch (1987); Switching Channels (1988) with Kathleen Turner, Burt Reynolds and Christopher Reeve; and Father of the Bride (1991) and its sequel Father of the Bride Part II. In 2009 he appeared in Locker 13.

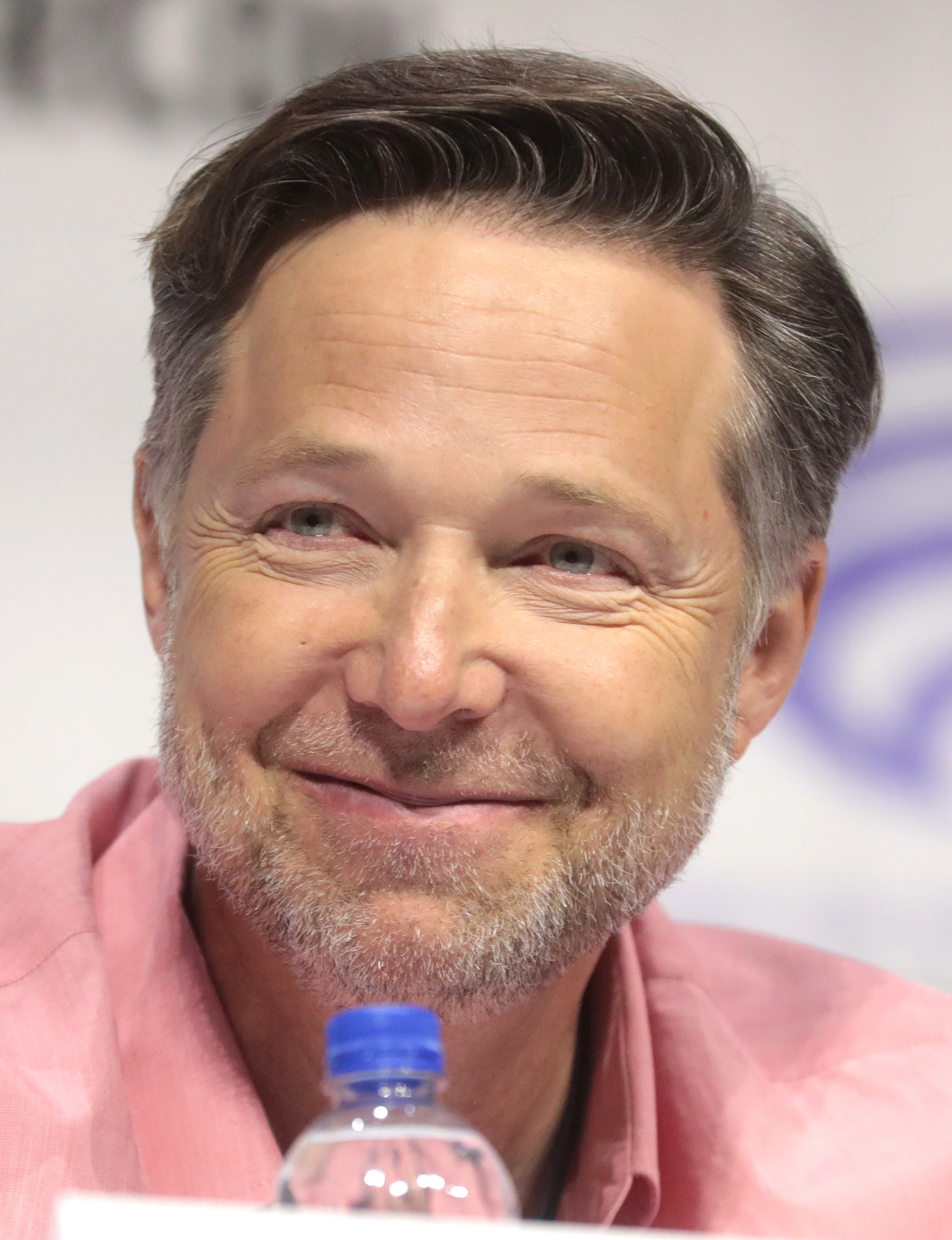
Newbern at WonderCon in Anaheim, California, March 2019

=== Voice acting ===
As a voice actor, Newbern is notable for his role as Clark Kent/Superman on the Cartoon Network series Justice League, Static Shock and Justice League Unlimited (replacing Tim Daly due to his obligations elsewhere). Newbern reprised his role as Superman in The Batman, the DC Showcase short Superman/Shazam!: The Return of Black Adam, Superman vs. The Elite, and Justice League vs. the Fatal Five. On February 26, 2016, the DC Universe Online Facebook page reported that Newbern would be taking over the role of Superman from Adam Baldwin. He also provides the voice of Superman in the game Injustice: Gods Among Us and its sequel. Newbern has portrayed the character longer than any other actor in live-action and animation.

Newbern voices a role in the cartoon series The Pirates of Dark Water, and he has done voiceovers in a number of video games and game-related productions. He has also voiced in the infamous Theodore Rex as the character of the same name. In 2003, Newbern provided the voice of Mevyn Nooj in Final Fantasy X-2. He also voiced Sephiroth in the Final Fantasy series and the Kingdom Hearts series.

Newbern's performance as Nooj reportedly impressed the developers at Square Enix enough for them to cast him as Sephiroth in the English version of Kingdom Hearts II, replacing Lance Bass. Newbern later reprised the role of Sephiroth in the English-language releases of Final Fantasy VII Advent Children, Crisis Core: Final Fantasy VII, Dissidia: Final Fantasy, Dissidia 012 Final Fantasy, and Dissidia Final Fantasy NT. He later appeared in the second season of Jericho as the president of the Allied States of America. Newbern also narrated Toyota's commercials for the 2010 model year of the Toyota Prius car, and portrayed Harold in Saw VI. He is also a prolific narrator of audiobooks, with narration credits on nearly 500 titles.

== Personal life ==
Newbern and actress Marietta DePrima met in the mid-1980s. They graduated together at Northwestern University in Evanston, Illinois, where DePrima was a member of Kappa Alpha Theta. The couple married in 1990 and have three children.

== Filmography ==
=== Film ===
Year	Title	Role	Notes
1986	My Little Girl	Woody	
1987	Adventures in Babysitting	Dan Lynch	
1987	Double Switch	Bart / Matt	Television film
1988	Paramedics	Uptown	
1988	Switching Channels	Siegenthaler	
1988	It Takes Two	Travis Rogers	
1991	Father of the Bride	Bryan MacKenzie	
1992	Little Sister	Mike	
1993	Doorways	Dr. Thomas Mason	Television film
1993	Doppelganger	Patrick Highsmith	Television film
1993	Torch Song	Wedge	Television film
1994	Power Play	Justin Avery	
1994	I Spy Returns	Bennett Robinson	Television film
1994	Witness to the Execution	Phillip Tyler	Television film
1995	Father of the Bride Part II	Bryan MacKenzie	
1995	Theodore Rex	Theodore Rex	Voice
1996	Far Harbor	Jordan	
1996	The Evening Star	Tommy Horton	
1998	Twice Upon a Time	Joe	Television film
1998	The Simple Life of Noah Dearborn	Christian Nelson	Television film
1999	Friends and Lovers	Ian Wickam	
2000	If These Walls Could Talk 2	Tom	Television film
2001	The Sons of Mistletoe	Jimmy Adams	Television film
2003	Kids' Ten Commandments: Stolen Gearts	Matthew	Voice, direct-to-video
2005	Buffalo Dreams	Dr. Nick Townsend	Television film
2006	Final Fantasy VII: Advent Children	Sephiroth	Voice
2007	A Dennis the Menace Christmas	Henry Mitchell	
2008	Fireflies in the Garden	Jimmy	
2008	Batman: Gotham Knight	Clark Kent, Man in Black, Guido, Man, Youth 3	Voice
2009	The Patient	George	
2009	Dadnapped	Neal Morris	Television film
2009	Locker 13	Robert Diener	Segment: "Midnight Blues"
2009	Saw VI	Harold Abbott	
2010	Superman/Shazam!: The Return of Black Adam	Clark Kent/Superman	Voice, direct-to-video
2011	The Heart of Christmas	Dr. Sandler	Television film
2012	3 Day Test	Martin Taylor	Direct-to-video
2012	Monster High: Escape from Skull Shores	Andy Beast	Voice, television film
2012	Superman vs. The Elite	Clark Kent/Superman	Voice, direct-to-video
2014	Justice League: War	Steve Trevor	Voice, direct-to-video
2015	Justice League: Throne of Atlantis	Steve Trevor	Voice, direct-to-video
2016	Pup Star	Bark	Voice, direct-to-video
2017	Pup Star: Better 2Gether	Bark	Voice, direct-to-video
2017	I Am Elizabeth Smart	Ed Smart	Television film
2018	Brimming With Love	Addison Rickford	Television film
2019	Justice League vs. the Fatal Five	Kal-El / Clark Kent / Superman	Voice, direct-to-video
2020	Father of the Bride, Part 3(ish)	Bryan MacKenzie	Short film

=== Television ===
Year	Title	Role	Notes
1982	The Blue and the Gray	Pvt Lawrence Jones (Union deserter at Bull Run)	Miniseries
1986	Family Ties	Eric	Episode: "My Brother's Keeper"
1986–1992	Designing Women	Payne McIlroy	4 episodes
1990	Poochinski	Det. Robert McKay	TV pilot
1990	Working Girl	Everett Rutledge	12 episodes
1991–1993	The Pirates of Dark Water	Ren	Voice
1994-1995	The Boys Are Back	Mike Hanson	18 episodes
1995	Courthouse	Sean	5 episodes
1997	Gold Fever	Will Patterson	Documentary
1997	Touched by an Angel	Michael Burns	Episode: "Amazing Grace: Part 1"
1997	Promised Land	Michael Burns	Episode: "Amazing Grace: Part 2"
1997	The Outer Limits	Ryan Unger	Episode: "Stream of Consciousness"
1997	Adventures from the Book of Virtues	Damon	Voice, episode: "Friendship"
1997	Perversions of Science	Walter	Episode: "Planely Possible"
1997–1998	Chicago Hope	Dr. Scott Frank	6 episodes
1998	From the Earth to the Moon	Stuart Roosa	Miniseries
1998	Friends	Danny	3 episodes
2000	Bull	Robert "Ditto" Roberts III	20 episodes
2001–2004	Justice League	Clark Kent / Superman	Voice, main role
2002	Providence	Owen Frank	21 episodes
2003	Static Shock	Clark Kent / Superman	Voice, episode: "Toys in the Hood"
2004	Boston Legal	Dr. Allen Konigsberg	Episode: "Loose Lips"
2004	CSI: Crime Scene Investigation	Dr. Todd Coombs	Episode: "Bloodlines"
2004	Johnny Bravo	Man, Waiter, Moustache Man	Voice, episode: "Get Shovelized/T Is for Trouble"
2005	Las Vegas	Matt Monroe	Episode: "For Sail by Owner"
2004–2006	Justice League Unlimited	Clark Kent / Superman, Bizarro	Voice, main role
2005-2006	Reunion	Paul Phillips	Recurring role, five episodes
2006	Cold Case	Bill Huxley (1979)	Episode: "The Key"
2006–2008	The Batman	Clark Kent / Superman	Voice, 4 episodes
2008	CSI: Miami	Kevin Weaver	Episode: "To Kill a Predator"
2008	Ben 10: Alien Force	Frank Tennyson	Voice, episode: "What Are Little Girls Made Of"
2008	Grey's Anatomy	Stan Mercer	Episode: "There's No 'I' in Team"
2008	Ghost Whisperer	Roger Gardner	Episode: "Ball & Chain"
2008	Jericho	President John Tomarchio	Episode: "Condor"
2009	Criminal Minds	Steven Baleman	Episode: "Soul Mates"
2009	CSI: NY	Alex Sheridan	Episode: "Rush to Judgement"
2009	Castle	Howard Peterson	Episode: "Nanny McDead"
2009	The Cleaner	Perry	Episode: "Path of Least Resistance"
2009	Private Practice	Brian Reynolds	Episode: "Slip Slidin' Away"
2010	Nip/Tuck	Dr. Curtis Ryerson	4 episodes
2010	The Mentalist	Dr. Cliff Edmunds	Episode: "Code Red"
2010	Miami Medical	Frank	Episode: "All Fall Down"
2010	NCIS	Arthur Haskell	Episode: "Dead Air"
2010	Suite 7	Gil	Episode: “Supermen”
2010–2011	Hot in Cleveland	Jordan	2 episodes
2012–2018	Scandal	Charlie	Recurring role
2015	Granite Flats	Scottie Andrews	8 episodes
2017	Grimm	Julian Levy	Episode: "The Son Also Rises"
2018–2019	Law & Order: Special Victims Unit	Dr. Al Pollack	4 episodes
2022	Reboot	Anders	Episode: "Step Right Up"
2022	Close Enough	Sam Snood the Science Dude	Voice, episode: "Bridgette the Brain"
2023	Record of Ragnarok	Hercules	Voice

=== Video games ===
Year	Title	Role	Notes
2003	Final Fantasy X-2	Nooj	
2005	Kingdom Hearts II	Sephiroth	
2007	Crisis Core: Final Fantasy VII	Sephiroth	
2008	Dissidia Final Fantasy	Sephiroth	
2011	Dissidia 012 Final Fantasy	Sephiroth	
2011	Star Wars: The Old Republic	Commander Naughlen, Master Volryder, Captain Perovius, Kon Yel, Lieutenant Tasser, Scientist	Uncredited
2013	Injustice: Gods Among Us	Clark Kent / Kal-El / Superman	
2016	DC Universe Online	Clark Kent / Kal-El / Superman	
2017	Injustice 2	Clark Kent / Kal-El / Superman	
2018	Dissidia Final Fantasy NT	Sephiroth	
2018	Mobius Final Fantasy	Sephiroth	
2022	MultiVersus	Clark Kent / Kal-El / Superman	
