= Michelle Harrison =

Michelle Harrison may refer to:

- Michelle Harrison (writer)
- Michelle Harrison (actress)
- Michelle Harrison (athlete)
