= Father's Little Dividend =

1951 film by Vincente Minnelli

- Theatrical poster
- Directed by: Vincente Minnelli
- Written by: Albert Hackett; Frances Goodrich
- Based on: Father of the Bride by Edward Streeter
- Produced by: Pandro S. Berman
- Starring: Spencer Tracy; Joan Bennett; Elizabeth Taylor; Russ Tamblyn; Don Taylor; Billie Burke; Moroni Olsen; Richard Rober; Marietta Canty; Paul Harvey
- Narrated by: Spencer Tracy
- Cinematography: John Alton
- Edited by: Ferris Webster
- Music by: Albert Sendrey
- Production company: Metro-Goldwyn-Mayer
- Distributed by: Loew's, Inc.
- Release dates: April 5, 1951 (Hollywood); April 12, 1951 (New York)
- Running time: 82 minutes
- Country: United States
- Language: English
- Budget: $941,000
- Box office: $4,622,000

The full film

Father's Little Dividend is a 1951 American comedy film directed by Vincente Minnelli and starring Spencer Tracy, Joan Bennett, and Elizabeth Taylor. The film is the sequel to Father of the Bride (1950).

== Plot ==
Middle-class family man Stanley Banks learns that his recently married daughter Kay and her husband Buckley Dunstan are expecting a baby. Stanley's wife Ellie and Buckley's parents Doris and Herbert are delighted, but Stanley broods that he is too young and vibrant to be a grandfather.

Ellie throws Kay a baby shower, although Stanley balks at the cost. Ellie suggests that they remodel their house so that Kay, Buckley and the baby can live with them, but Stanley refuses. The Dunstans announce plans to add a wing to their home for the couple, but Kay and Buckley reveal that they have just bought their own house.

After settling into their new home, Kay, who is very close to her father, expresses her concern that the baby will change her relationship with Buckley. Stanley comforts her by telling her how much he had loved her as a baby. Soon the Bankses and the Dunstans are trying to outdo one another buying gifts and making plans for the baby. One night, while listening to Ellie, Doris, and Herbert bicker over the baby's name, Kay becomes upset and only Stanley is able to comfort her. Although he pledges to Kay that the in-laws will not interfere again, Stanley drags Ellie to Kay's physician, Dr. Andrew Nordell.

Things remain calm until Stanley is awakened by a late-night call from Buckley with news that Kay has left him. At the Banks house, Buckley and Kay reconcile after Kay's jealousy is revealed to be a misunderstanding stemming from Buckley's late nights working at the office. Kay and Stanley realize Buckley's devotion to his family.

As the birth approaches, the nerves of the parents and grandparents become frayed. However, the baby cries whenever Stanley comes near him. When the baby is six months old, Kay joins Buckley on a business trip and leaves the baby with her parents, hoping to give Stanley time to grow closer to his grandson. One afternoon, while Kay is still away, Stanley takes the baby for a walk in the park. After joining some boys in a game of soccer, he loses track of time and cannot find the carriage. He frantically retraces his steps back to the house. Seeing through the window that Kay has returned early, he panics and takes a taxi to the police station. Stanley confesses to the police sergeant that he has lost the baby and secretly prays that his grandson will not scream when he holds him. To Stanley's relief, the baby is delighted to see him, and from that moment on, they are devoted to each other.

At the baby's christening, Stanley beams with pride as his grandson is named Stanley Banks Dunstan.

== Cast ==
- Spencer Tracy as Stanley T. Banks
- Joan Bennett as Ellie Banks
- Elizabeth Taylor as Kay Dunstan
- Don Taylor as Buckley Dunstan
- Billie Burke as Doris Dunstan
- Moroni Olsen as Herbert Dunstan
- Richard Rober as Police Sergeant
- Marietta Canty as Delilah
- Russ Tamblyn as Tommy Banks (credited as Rusty Tamblyn)
- Tom Irish as Ben Banks
- Hayden Rorke as Dr. Andrew Nordell
- Paul Harvey as Reverend Galsworthy
- Donald and Donna Clark as baby Stanley Banks Dunstan

== Production ==
Father of the Bride was such a hit at the box office and with critics that MGM rushed a sequel into production in 1950. Its working title was Now I Am a Grandfather.

Spencer Tracy and Joan Bennett had appeared in films together at Fox two decades earlier, including Me and My Gal, in which their characters marry, and She Wanted a Millionaire.

According to film critic Leonard Maltin, this film was one of the first examples of a modern film sequel.

== Reception ==
The world premiere of Father's Little Dividend was held at Grauman's Egyptian Theatre in Hollywood on April 5, 1951 as a benefit for the John Tracy Clinic. The film was preceded by a screening of the short color film Listening Eyes, which documented the work of the clinic and was produced and funded by Walt Disney. The benefit event was staged by a committee headed by Esther Williams, and the master of ceremonies was George Murphy. Spencer Tracy and his wife addressed the audience, which sang "Happy Birthday to You" to Tracy, as it was his 51st birthday.

In a contemporary review for The New York Times, critic Bosley Crowther called the film "grand diversion" and wrote: "It is not very often that the sequel to a successful film turns out to be even half as successful or rewarding as the original picture was. But we've got to hand it to Metro: its sequel to 'Father of the Bride' is so close that we'll willingly concede it to the humor and charm of that former film. ... Mr. Tracy does a wonderful job of displaying the agonized reactions of a father and a badly baffled man. In him again is superbly mirrored a real American type—slightly prettified and idealized, we'll grant you, but never sugared or overdone."

Critic Edwin Schallert of the Los Angeles Times wrote: "The new film merits approbation as a successful sequel of which there are not too many. It is in many ways more amusing than its predecessor."

According to MGM records, the film earned $3,122,000 in the U.S. and Canada and $1.5 million elsewhere, resulting in a profit of $2,025,000.

== Legacy ==
The film was remade in 1995 as Father of the Bride Part II, with Steve Martin and Diane Keaton in Tracy's and Bennett's roles.

== Copyright status ==
Originally released by Metro-Goldwyn-Mayer, the film entered the public domain in the United States in 1979 because MGM failed to renew the copyright registration. Warner Bros. Entertainment owns the distribution rights to the original through its ownership of Turner Entertainment. While the film has been released by many public-domain DVD labels, it has since been restored and released on Blu-ray disc on Aug 29, 2023 as part of the Warner Archive Collection.
