= Father of the Bride Part II =

1995 film by Charles Shyer

- Theatrical release poster
- Directed by: Charles Shyer
- Written by: Nancy Meyers; Charles Shyer
- Based on: Father's Little Dividend by Albert Hackett and Frances Goodrich
- Produced by: Nancy Meyers
- Starring: Steve Martin; Diane Keaton; Martin Short; Kimberly Williams; George Newbern; Kieran Culkin
- Cinematography: William A. Fraker
- Edited by: Stephen A. Rotter
- Music by: Alan Silvestri
- Production companies: Touchstone Pictures; Sandollar Productions; The Meyers/Shyer Company
- Distributed by: Buena Vista Pictures Distribution
- Release date: December 8, 1995
- Running time: 106 minutes
- Country: United States
- Language: English
- Budget: <$40 million
- Box office: $103 million

Father of the Bride Part II is a 1995 American comedy film starring Steve Martin, Diane Keaton, and Martin Short. It is a sequel to the 1991 film Father of the Bride, remake of the 1951 film Father's Little Dividend which was the sequel to the original 1950 titular film, and fourth installment overall in the Father of the Bride franchise.

== Plot ==
Four years after the events of the first film, Annie tells her family that she is pregnant. George narrates what he had to go through for the nine months of her pregnancy. He begins to panic, believing himself too young to be a grandfather. He has his assistant make a list of people who are older than him, dyes his hair brown, and after the roof leaks, his wife Nina agrees to sell the house their children grew up in if one more thing goes wrong with it.

Termites strike the house two weeks later. George sells it to the Habibs without telling Nina. At dinner, after discussing whether the baby's last name will be hyphenated or not, George changes the subject by revealing the house has been sold. Nina is livid, as they have to be out in ten days and no place to go. They stay in the mansion owned by Bryan's parents, John and Joanna MacKenzie, who are on a cruise in the Caribbean. George and Nina have to deal with the MacKenzies' Dobermans, much to the chagrin of George, who is still paranoid from a previous mishap with them. Nina begins experiencing symptoms that bring up the concern of menopause. The following day, they go to the doctor and discover that, actually, she is pregnant, too.

Following this unexpected news, they have a chance meeting with Franck, their former wedding planner, who is elated at both women expecting. Driving home, they have differing perspectives on the prospect of becoming new parents again. George switches gears, now believing he is too old to be a father again. His feelings come to a head when he and Nina go to Annie and Bryan's house to announce their news. Nina brings his insensitivity to light and tells him not to come home.

Out for a walk, George notices that their old street is blocked off and sees a demolition crew with a wrecking ball at their old house, inferring that Mr. Habib plans to demolish it. Upset, George runs in and tries to stop them. He pleads with Mr. Habib not to do so since he is going to be a father again, as there is sentimental value to it. He realizes that if he will have another child, he wants to raise it there. When he offers to buy it back, Habib agrees on the condition that he pay him $100,000 up front. He reluctantly gives in. He and Nina then move back into it.

Annie shows up at the Banks' house after she and Bryan had a fight. She is offered a great job in Boston but Bryan feels that they shouldn't move so far away with the baby coming. Despite hating the idea of them doing so, George encourages Annie to take the job. Bryan arrives to apologize and agrees to move to Boston.

George hires Franck to do a double baby shower. A few weeks before the due date Bryan is called away to an emergency meeting in Japan, leaving Annie in George and Nina's care. Nina and Annie are moving along in their simultaneous pregnancies and need constant care from George. Matty and Franck take over while he is at work. Franck turns a simple redecoration of George and Nina's new baby's nursery into a full-scale renovation/addition, which he calls "the baby's suite". Eventually, all the stress and nights of sleep deprivation wear George out. When the suite is revealed, Franck offers him "Vatsnik", sleeping pills from his native country, after he reveals he has not been getting enough sleep. He takes two which proves to be too high of a dosage and passes out before dinner. The family becomes worried, which is only increased when Annie goes into labor.

Franck takes over the role of driving the family to the hospital with a barely coherent George in tow. After being mistaken for a patient in need of a prostate exam, he regains full consciousness. Nina goes into labor shortly after. George is cynical about the young obstetrician who fills in because their own is unavailable. He comes to terms with the arrangement after she tells him that she has delivered hundreds of babies. Bryan soon returns to be with Annie, who has a boy named George and Nina has a girl named Megan. George is happy to hold them in his arms. He finishes narrating his story and picks up where it left off. Bryan, Annie, and baby George later move to Boston.

== Cast ==
- Steve Martin as George Stanley Banks
- Diane Keaton as Nina Banks (née Dickerson), George's wife
- Martin Short as Franck Eggelhoffer
- Kimberly Williams as Annie Banks-MacKenzie, George & Nina's daughter
  - Hallie Meyers-Shyer as 7-year-old Annie
  - Stephanie Miller as 4-year-old Annie
- George Newbern as Bryan MacKenzie, Annie's husband
- Kieran Culkin as Matthew "Matty" Banks, George & Nina's son
- BD Wong as Howard Weinstein, Franck's assistant
- Jane Adams as Dr. Megan Eisenberg
- Eugene Levy as Mr. Habib
- Peter Michael Goetz as John MacKenzie, Bryan's father
- Kate McGregor-Stewart as Joanna MacKenzie, Bryan's mother
- Jay Wolpert as Dr. Brooks
- Susan Beaubian as Nurse Diana Blackwell (credited as Annie's Nurse)
- Roxanne Beckford as Nurse Suzanne Jones
- Jonathan and Thomas Selstad as George MacKenzie, Annie & Bryan's son
  - Casey and Dylan Boersma as Baby George
- Katie Pierce as Megan Banks, George & Nina's daughter
  - Jerri Rose White and Shannon Kennedy as Baby Megan

== Reception ==
=== Box office ===
In its opening weekend the film made $11.1 million from 1,949 theaters, finishing second at the US box office. It went on to gross $76.6 million in the United States and Canada and $103 million worldwide.

=== Critical response ===
On Rotten Tomatoes, the film holds an approval rating of 52% based on 25 reviews, with an average rating of 5.7/10. On Metacritic, the film has a weighted average score of 49 out of 100, based on 16 critics, indicating "mixed or average" reviews. Audiences polled by CinemaScore gave the film an average grade of "A−" on an A+ to F scale.

Roger Ebert of the Chicago Sun-Times wrote: "Father of the Bride Part II is not a great movie and not even as good as its 1991 inspiration. But it is warm and fuzzy, and has some good laughs and a lot of sweetness."

== Soundtrack ==
Alan Silvestri returned to score the music for the film. The officially released soundtrack album contains the following 15 tracks:

1. Give Me the Simple Life (by Steve Tyrell)
2. Annie Returns
3. Here Comes the Judge (Judge Tinkleberry's Theme)
4. The Way You Look Tonight (by Steve Tyrell)
5. Drivin' Me Crazy
6. You Gotta Be Kiddin' Me
7. When The Saints Go Marching In (by Fats Domino)
8. Summer Montage
9. George Walks
10. Remembering Annie (Squirrel Montage) (by Ralph Waldman)
11. Ain't Nobody Cheatin'
12. Rush Down Corridor
13. George Tells a Story About Divorce
14. On the Sunny Side of the Street (by Steve Tyrell)
15. End Credit Suite

== Sequel ==
In 1996, Meyers confirmed that she and Shyer were planning a third installment in the Father of the Bride series, which would "have their characters confronting serious problems in their relationship – but ending up with a stronger bond than ever" - though ultimately a sequel failed to materialize. In 2014, reports arose regarding a gay marriage themed Father of the Bride 3, reportedly again directed by Shyer, which was said to focus on a 29-year-old Matty Banks after he announces his engagement to the son of a US Navy Seal. Steve Martin denied the rumors on his social media, stating that he had neither seen a script, nor been offered the role.

On September 25, 2020, a mini-sequel titled Father of the Bride Part 3(ish) premiered on Netflix's official YouTube channel and Facebook, reuniting most of the original cast from the first two films, and was directed by Nancy Meyers. The short film also acted as a charity event, raising funds for the World Central Kitchen during the COVID-19 pandemic.

== Controversy ==
In August 1997, American-Arab Anti-Discrimination Committee listed Father of the Bride Part II along with G.I. Jane and Operation Condor as examples of Disney produced and distributed films perpetuating negative stereotypes, in particular referring to Eugene Levy's character Mr. Habib as "a grotesque Arab character."
