= Kimberly Williams-Paisley =

American actress and director (b. 1971)

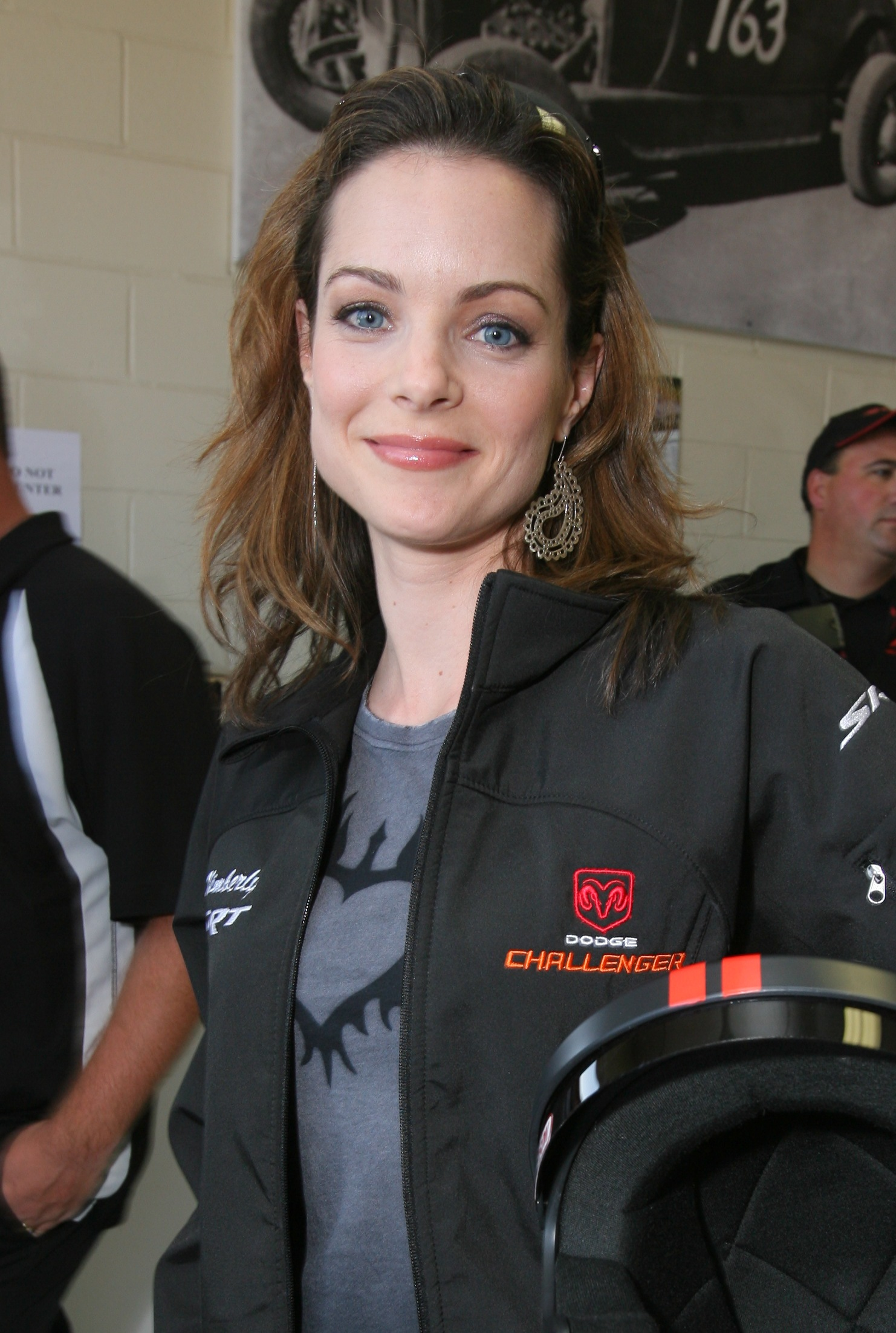
- Williams-Paisley in 2008
- Born: September 14, 1971 (age 55); Rye, New York, U.S.
- Other name: Kimberly Williams
- Education: Northwestern University
- Occupation: Actress
- Years active: 1988–present
- Known for: According to Jim; Father of the Bride
- Spouse: Brad Paisley (m. 2003)
- Children: 2
- Relatives: Ashley Williams (sister); Neal Dodson (brother-in-law)
- Website: kimberlywilliams-paisley.com

Kimberly Williams-Paisley (née Williams, born September 14, 1971) is an American actress known for her starring role in The 10th Kingdom, and roles on According to Jim and Nashville, as well as her breakthrough in Father of the Bride (1991), for which she was nominated for several teen awards, and its sequel, Father of the Bride Part II (1995). Throughout her career, she has guest starred on shows including Tales from the Crypt, George Lopez and Less than Perfect. She is also known for her roles in made-for-TV movies, including Safe House, The Christmas Shoes, and Lucky 7, and also her role as Laura Parker in Shade, a short film that she also wrote and directed. Williams is married to country musician Brad Paisley, with whom she has two sons; actress Ashley Williams is her sister.

== Early life ==
Williams-Paisley was born in Rye, New York, the daughter of Linda Barbara (née Payne), a fund-raiser, and Gurney Williams III, a health and science writer. She has a sister, Ashley, also an actress, and a brother. Williams has been in show business since the age of 13. In 1989, she directed the Rye High School Musical Revue. She left Northwestern University during her sophomore year to appear in the 1991 film version of Father of the Bride but returned to complete her degree in drama. While there, she was a sister of the Alpha Phi sorority.

== Career ==
Williams-Paisley's breakthrough role was Annie Banks in Father of the Bride (1991) and Father of the Bride Part II (1995), with Steve Martin and Diane Keaton. She later appeared in Indian Summer (1993), Coldblooded (1995), The War at Home (1996), and in 1996 landed the lead role in the ABC drama series Relativity. She won critical acclaim for her performance, but the series was canceled after 17 episodes due to low ratings. In 2000, Williams-Paisley starred as Virginia in the fantasy miniseries The 10th Kingdom.

From 2001 to 2008, Williams-Paisley played the role of Dana in the ABC sitcom According to Jim, opposite Jim Belushi and Courtney Thorne-Smith. She left the show after its seventh season, but she came back for the show's final episode in 2009. On stage, Williams-Paisley replaced Arija Bareikis as Sunny in The Last Night of Ballyhoo, written by Alfred Uhry (of Driving Miss Daisy fame) sometime later in the play's February 1997 to June 1998 run. During the late 1990s and 2000s, she starred in a number of made for television movies including Safe House, The Christmas Shoes, and Lucky 7, and also guest starred on Tales from the Crypt, George Lopez, Less than Perfect, Boston Legal, and Royal Pains. In film, she starred opposite Matthew McConaughey in 2006 drama We Are Marshall.

In 2012, Williams-Paisley began starring in the recurring role of Peggy Kenter in the ABC drama series Nashville, and in 2014 had a recurring role as Gretchen in CBS comedy series Two and a Half Men. In December 18, 2015, Williams-Paisley starred in Alvin and the Chipmunks: The Road Chip as Samantha. She also played Claire Pierce in the Netflix holiday films The Christmas Chronicles (2018) and The Christmas Chronicles 2 (2020). In 2020, Williams-Paisley reprised the role of Annie Banks in the short film Father of the Bride Part 3(ish). In 2025, she began starring as Cammie Raleigh in the series 9-1-1: Nashville.

== Personal life ==
On March 15, 2003, Williams married country music singer Brad Paisley. She gave birth to their first child, a son, in Nashville, Tennessee, where the family lives. They subsequently had a second son.

Her mother, Linda, was diagnosed with primary progressive aphasia, which is a form of dementia. Williams-Paisley is the author of Where the Light Gets In, published on April 5, 2016. The book tells the story of her mother's illness from her diagnosis until her death. Her mother died in November 2016, seven months after the book was published.

== Filmography ==
=== Film ===
Year	Title	Role	Note
1991	Wild Hearts		
1991	Father of the Bride	Annie Banks	Film debut
1993	Samuel Beckett Is Coming Soon	Kim	
1993	Indian Summer	Gwen Daugherty	
1995	Coldblooded	Jasmine	
1995	Father of the Bride Part II	Annie Banks-MacKenzie	
1996	The War at Home	Karen Collier	
1998	Safe House	Andi Travers	
1998	Just a Little Harmless Sex	Allison	
1999	Elephant Juice	Dodie	
1999	Simpatico	Young Rosie	
2002	Ten Tiny Love Stories	Five	
2003	Shade	Laura Parker	Short film; also producer, director, writer
2003	How to Go Out on a Date in Queens	Amy	
2004	Identity Theft	Michelle Brown	
2005	Porco Rosso	Fio	Voice role- Disney Dub
2006	How to Eat Fried Worms	Helen Forrester	
2006	We Are Marshall	Sandy Lengyel	
2012	Eden Court	Bonnie Duncan	
2014	Ask Me Anything	Margaret Spooner	
2015	Alvin and the Chipmunks: The Road Chip	Samantha	
2017	Speech & Debate	Susan Merrick	
2017	You Get Me	Mrs. Hanson	
2018	The Christmas Chronicles	Claire Pierce	
2020	The Violent Heart	Helen	
2020	Father of the Bride, Part 3(ish)	Annie Banks-MacKenzie	Short film
2020	The Christmas Chronicles 2	Claire Pierce	
2023	Dog Gone	Ginny Marshall	
2023	Jesus Revolution	Charlene	

=== Television ===
Year	Title	Role	Notes
1990	ABC Afterschool Special	Vanessa	Episode: "Stood Up!"
1994	Tales from the Crypt	Hiley Zeller	Episode: "The Bribe"
1996	Jake's Women	Molly	Theatrical play
1996	Relativity	Isabel Lukens	Series regular (17 episodes)
2000	The 10th Kingdom	Virginia Lewis	Miniseries
2001	Follow the Stars Home	Dianne Parker- McCune	Television film (Hallmark Hall of Fame)
2001–2008	According to Jim	Dana Gibson	Main role (season 1-7); Special Guest (season 8); 165 episodes; also directed 3 episodes
2002	The Christmas Shoes	Maggie Elizabeth Andrews	Television film (CBS)
2003	Lucky 7	Amy Myer	Television film; also co-producer
2004	Identity Theft: The Michelle Brown Story	Michelle Brown	Television film (Lifetime); also co-producer
2004	George Lopez	Vanessa Brooks	Episode: "E.I.? E.I. OH"
2005	Less than Perfect	Laura	Episode: "Get Away"
2008	Wonder Pets	Mama Armadillo (voice)	Episode: "Save the Armadillo"
2008	Boston Legal	Attorney Elisa Brooks	Episode: "Last Call"
2010	Amish Grace	Ida Graber	Television film (Lifetime)
2012	Royal Pains	Sam Chard	Episode: "Business and Pleasure"
2012–2013	Nashville	Peggy Kenter	Recurring role; 22 episodes
2014	Two and a Half Men	Gretchen	Recurring role; 6 episodes
2017	Darrow and Darrow	Claire Darrow	Television film (Hallmark Movies & Mysteries)
2017	The Christmas Train	Eleanor Carter	Television film (Hallmark Hall of Fame)
2018	Darrow & Darrow 2	Claire Darrow	Television film
2018	Darrow & Darrow: Body of Evidence	Claire Darrow	Television film
2019	Dolly Parton's Heartstrings	Emily	Episode: "Jolene"
2019	The Flash	Renee Adler	2 episodes
2019	Witness to Murder	Claire Darrow	Hallmark Movie
2020	A Nashville Christmas Carol	Spirit of Christmas Present	Hallmark Movie
2021	Sister Swap: A Hometown Holiday	Jennifer	Hallmark Movie
2021	Sister Swap: Christmas in the City	Jennifer	Hallmark Movie
2025	Farmer Wants a Wife	Herself	Presenter
2025	9-1-1	Cammie Raleigh	Episode: "The Sky is Falling"
2025- present	9-1-1: Nashville	Cammie Raleigh	Main role; 17 episodes

=== As producer, writer, and/or director ===
Year	Title	Notes
2003	Lucky 7	Co-producer
2004	Identity Theft: The Michelle Brown Story	Co-producer; also played the lead character
2006	Shade	Producer, director, writer
2006–2008	According to Jim	Director; 3 episodes
2007	Numero Dos	Director, writer
2010	When Mom's Away	Executive producer

== Awards and nominations ==
Year	Association	Category	Work	Result
1992	MTV Movie Awards	Best Breakthrough Performance	Father of the Bride	Nominated
1996	Satellite Awards	Best Performance by an Actress in a Dramatic Television Series	Relativity	Nominated
2006	Heartland Film Festival	Crystal Heart Award for Best Dramatic Short Film	Shade	Won
2006	Heartland Film Festival	Vision Award for Best Short Film	Shade	Won
2006	Sedona International Film Festival	Outstanding Acting & Directing	Shade	Won

== Bibliography ==
- Where the Light Gets In: Losing My Mother Only to Find Her Again (2016)
