= Spencer Tracy filmography =

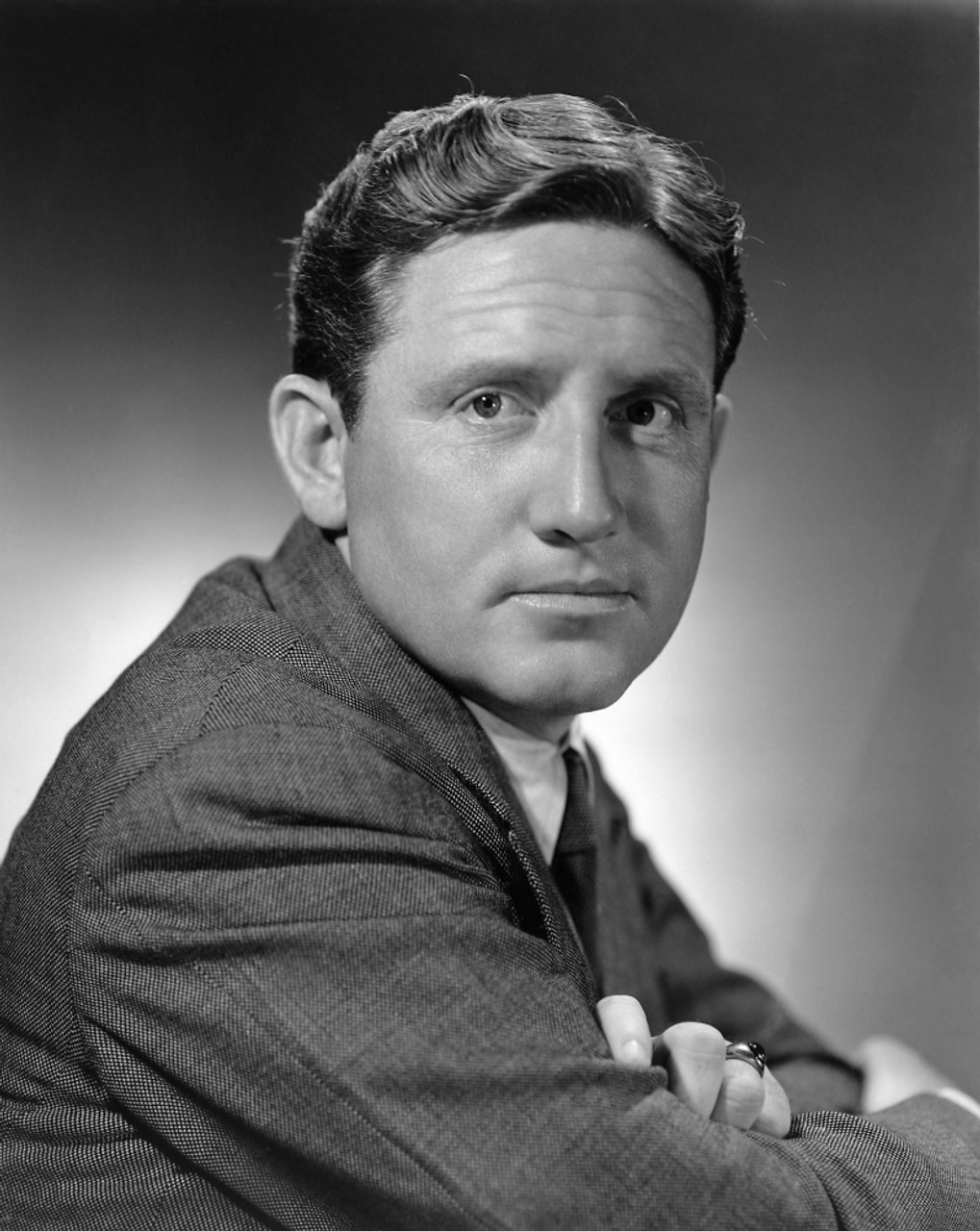
Tracy in the 1930s

Spencer Tracy (1900–1967) was an American actor. His film career began in 1930 with Up the River (directed by John Ford and co-starring Humphrey Bogart), and ended in 1967 with Guess Who's Coming to Dinner (alongside Sidney Poitier and his longtime screen partner, Katharine Hepburn). Within his 37-year career, Tracy starred in 75 feature films and several short films.

He earned nine Academy Award for Best Actor nominations (tied for the most in that category with Laurence Olivier) throughout his career, and was the first male actor to win two consecutively, for Captains Courageous (1937) and Boys Town (1938) (directed by Victor Fleming and Norman Taurog, respectively). He set this record just one year after Luise Rainer became the first female, and actress in general, to win "bookend Oscars".

The other seven films he was nominated for Academy Awards were San Francisco (1936) (directed by W. S. Van Dyke); Father of the Bride (1950) (directed by Vincente Minnelli); Bad Day at Black Rock (1955) and The Old Man and the Sea (1958) (both directed by John Sturges); Inherit the Wind (1960), Judgment at Nuremberg (1961), and posthumously for his final film, Guess Who's Coming to Dinner (1967). (The second actor in this category to be nominated posthumously after James Dean's two consecutive posthumous nominations one decade earlier.) The latter three films were all directed by Stanley Kramer, with whom Tracy had developed a partnership.

Other films which earned Tracy accolades include The Actress (1953) (directed by George Cukor—for which he won his only Golden Globe Award); The Mountain (1956) (directed by Edward Dmytryk); and The Last Hurrah (1958) (also directed by Ford). One of Tracy's biggest box office hits was his penultimate film (and the third of four working with Kramer), It's a Mad, Mad, Mad, Mad World (1963). He received the Cannes Best Actor award for Bad Day at Black Rock and a posthumous BAFTA for "Dinner".

Hepburn & Tracy also became a legendary screen team. Their first pairing was in the film Woman of the Year (1942) (directed by George Stevens), which earned Hepburn her third Oscar nom. Subsequent Hepburn/Tracy films included Keeper of the Flame (1942) (once again, directed by Cukor), Without Love (1945) (directed by Harold S. Bucquet), Sea of Grass (1947) (directed by Elia Kazan), State of the Union (1948) (directed by Frank Capra); Adam's Rib (1949) and Pat and Mike (1952) (both also directed by Cukor); Desk Set (1957) (directed by Walter Lang); and finally culminating with the aforementioned "Dinner", prior to Tracy's fatal heart attack in 1967 at the age of 67.

== Filmography ==
Year	Title	Role	Studio	Notes
1930	Taxi Talks	Taxi Driver	Warner Bros.	Short subject
1930	The Hard Guy	Guy	Warner Bros.	Short subject
1930	Up the River	Saint Louis	Fox	With Humphrey Bogart
1931	Quick Millions	Daniel J. "Bugs" Raymond	Fox	With George Raft in key supporting role
1931	Six Cylinder Love	William Donroy	Fox	With Edward Everett Horton
1931	Goldie	Bill	Fox	With Jean Harlow
1932	She Wanted a Millionaire	William Kelley	Fox	With Joan Bennett
1932	Sky Devils	Wilkie	United Artists	Co-written by Robert Benchley
1932	Disorderly Conduct	Dick Fay	Fox	
1932	Young America	Jack Doray	Fox	Directed by Frank Borzage
1932	Society Girl	Briscoe	Fox	
1932	The Painted Woman	Tom Brian	Fox	
1932	Me and My Gal	Danny Dolan	Fox	With Joan Bennett
1932	20,000 Years in Sing Sing	Tommy Connors	Warner Bros.	With Bette Davis
1933	Face in the Sky	Joe Buck	Fox	With Stuart Erwin
1933	Shanghai Madness	Pat Jackson	Fox	With Fay Wray
1933	The Power and the Glory	Tom Garner	Fox	Written by Preston Sturges
1933	The Mad Game	Edward Carson	Fox	With Claire Trevor
1933	Man's Castle	Bill	Columbia	With Loretta Young
1934	The Show-Off	J. Aubrey Piper	MGM	Tracy's first MGM film
1934	Looking for Trouble	Joe Graham	20th Century Pictures with United Artists	With Jack Oakie
1934	Bottoms Up	"Smoothie" King	Fox	
1934	Now I'll Tell	Murray Golden	Fox	With Helen Twelvetrees
1934	Marie Galante	Dr. Crawbett	Fox	
1935	It's a Small World	Bill Shevlin	Fox	With Wendy Barrie
1935	The Murder Man	Steven "Steve" Grey	MGM	First credited screen role of James Stewart
1935	Dante's Inferno	Jim Carter	Fox	With Claire Trevor and dancer Rita Hayworth (billed as Rita Cansino)
1935	Whipsaw	Ross "Mac" McBride	MGM	With Myrna Loy
1936	Riffraff	Dutch Muller	MGM	With Jean Harlow and Mickey Rooney
1936	Fury	Joe Wilson	MGM	With Sylvia Sidney
1936	San Francisco	Father Tim Mullin	MGM	With Clark Gable; Nominated—Academy Award for Best Actor; Nominated—New York Film Critics Circle Award for Best Actor
1936	Libeled Lady	Warren Haggerty	MGM	The film was nominated for Best Picture, but lost out to The Great Ziegfeld. With William Powell, Jean Harlow, and Myrna Loy
1937	They Gave Him a Gun	Fred P. Willis	MGM	With Gladys George
1937	Captains Courageous	Manuel Fidello	MGM	With Lionel Barrymore, John Carradine, Melvyn Douglas, Mickey Rooney, and Freddie Bartholomew; Academy Award for Best Actor; Nominated—New York Film Critics Circle Award for Best Actor
1937	Big City	Joe Benton	MGM	With Luise Rainer
1937	Mannequin	John L. Hennessey	MGM	With Joan Crawford
1938	Test Pilot	Gunner Morris	MGM	With Clark Gable and Myrna Loy
1938	Boys Town	Father Flanagan	MGM	With Mickey Rooney; Academy Award for Best Actor; Nominated—New York Film Critics Circle Award for Best Actor
1938	Another Romance of Celluloid	Himself	MGM	Behind-the-scenes short film, includes filming of Test Pilot, and shows Tracy accepting his Academy Award for Boys Town
1938	Screen Snapshots Series 17, No. 9	Himself	Columbia	Short subject showing Tracy accepting his Academy Award for Boys Town
1938	Hollywood Goes to Town	Himself	MGM	Short subject, showing notable Hollywood performers preparing for the world premiere of Marie Antoinette
1939	Stanley and Livingstone	Henry M. Stanley	20th Century Fox	With Nancy Kelly
1939	For Auld Lang Syne	Himself	Will Rogers Memorial Commission	Fund-raising short film in which several actors, including Tracy, appeal for funds for the Will Rogers Memorial Hospital
1939	Hollywood Hobbies	Himself	MGM	Behind-the-scenes short film
1940	I Take This Woman	Dr. Karl Decker	MGM	With Hedy Lamarr
1940	Young Tom Edison	Man Admiring Portrait of Thomas A. Edison	MGM	With Mickey Rooney; Tracy appears as a man admiring a portrait of Edison; he plays the older Edison in Edison, the Man in the same year Uncredited
1940	Northwest Passage	Major Rogers	MGM	With Walter Brennan
1940	Edison, the Man	Thomas Edison	MGM	
1940	Boom Town	Jonathan Sand	MGM	With Clark Gable, Claudette Colbert, and Hedy Lamarr
1940	Northward, Ho!	Himself	MGM	Behind-the-scenes short film about the filming of Northwest Passage
1941	Men of Boys Town	Father Flanagan	MGM	With Mickey Rooney
1941	Dr. Jekyll and Mr. Hyde	Dr. Henry Jekyll / Mr Edward Hyde	MGM	With Ingrid Bergman and Lana Turner
1942	Woman of the Year	Sam Craig	MGM	First film with Katharine Hepburn
1942	Tortilla Flat	Pilon	MGM	With John Garfield
1942	Ring of Steel	Narrator	Warner Brothers	Military documentary for U.S. Office for Emergency Management
1943	Keeper of the Flame	Steven "Stevie" O'Malley	MGM	With Katharine Hepburn
1943	His New World	Narrator	MGM	War documentary
1943	A Guy Named Joe	Pete Sandidge	MGM	With Van Johnson
1944	The Seventh Cross	George Heisler	MGM	
1944	Thirty Seconds Over Tokyo	Lieutenant Colonel James H. Doolittle	MGM	With Van Johnson and Robert Walker
1945	Without Love	Pat Jamieson	MGM	With Katharine Hepburn
1947	The Sea of Grass	Col. James B. "Jim" Brewton	MGM	With Katharine Hepburn
1947	Cass Timberlane	Cass Timberlane	MGM	With Lana Turner
1948	State of the Union	Grant Matthews	MGM	With Katharine Hepburn
1949	Edward, My Son	Arnold Boult	MGM	With Deborah Kerr
1949	Adam's Rib	Adam Bonner	MGM	With Katharine Hepburn
1949	Malaya	Canaghan	MGM	With James Stewart and Lionel Barrymore
1949	Some of the Best	Himself	MGM	Retrospective of MGM's history
1950	Father of the Bride	Stanley T. Banks	MGM	Nominated—Academy Award for Best Actor. With Joan Bennett and Elizabeth Taylor
1951	Father's Little Dividend	Stanley T. Banks	MGM	With Joan Bennett and Elizabeth Taylor
1951	The People Against O'Hara	James P. Curtayne	MGM	With Pat O'Brien
1951	For Defense for Freedom for Humanity	Himself	MGM	Short film in which Tracy urges support for Red Cross fund-raising
1952	Pat and Mike	Mike Conovan	MGM	With Katharine Hepburn
1952	Plymouth Adventure	Captain Christopher Jones	MGM	With Gene Tierney
1953	The Actress	Clinton Jones	MGM	Golden Globe Award for Best Actor – Motion Picture Drama; Nominated—BAFTA Award for Best Foreign Actor; Nominated—New York Film Critics Circle Award for Best Actor With Jean Simmons
1954	Broken Lance	Matt Devereaux	20th Century Fox	With Robert Wagner
1955	Bad Day at Black Rock	John J. Macreedy	MGM	Best Actor Award (Cannes Film Festival) Prix d'interprétation masculine Nominated—Academy Award for Best Actor; Nominated—New York Film Critics Circle Award for Best Actor
1956	The Mountain	Zachary Teller	Paramount	Nominated—BAFTA Award for Best Foreign Actor
1957	Desk Set	Richard Sumner	20th Century Fox	With Katharine Hepburn, and Tracy's last film with Zanck and Schneck and Fox
1958	The Old Man and the Sea	The Old Man / Narrator	Warner Bros.	NBR Award for Best Actor (also for The Last Hurrah); Nominated—Academy Award for Best Actor; Nominated—Golden Globe Award for Best Actor – Motion Picture Drama; Nominated—New York Film Critics Circle Award for Best Actor
1958	The Last Hurrah	Mayor Frank Skeffington	Columbia	NBR Award for Best Actor (also for The Old Man and the Sea); Nominated—BAFTA Award for Best Foreign Actor; Nominated—New York Film Critics Circle Award for Best Actor
1960	Inherit the Wind	Henry Drummond	United Artists	Nominated—Academy Award for Best Actor; Nominated—BAFTA Award for Best Foreign Actor; Nominated—Golden Globe Award for Best Actor – Motion Picture Drama
1961	The Devil at 4 O'Clock	Father Matthew Doonan	Columbia	With Frank Sinatra
1961	Judgment at Nuremberg	Chief Judge Dan Haywood	United Artists	Fotogramas de Plata Award for Best Foreign Performer; Nominated—Academy Award for Best Actor - With Burt Lancaster, Marlene Dietrich, Richard Widmark, Judy Garland, Montgomery Clift
1962	How the West Was Won	Narrator (voice)	MGM	
1963	It's a Mad, Mad, Mad, Mad World	Captain T. G. Culpeper	United Artists	With Milton Berle, Sid Caesar, Ethel Merman, Jonathan Winters, Mickey Rooney, Buddy Hackett, many more
1967	Guess Who's Coming to Dinner	Matt Drayton	Columbia	With Katharine Hepburn and Sidney Poitier; BAFTA Award for Best Actor in a Leading Role; Nominated—Academy Award for Best Actor; Nominated—Golden Globe Award for Best Actor – Motion Picture Drama; Nominated—New York Film Critics Circle Award for Best Actor; Released posthumously (final film role)

=== Box office ranking ===
For several years, exhibitors voted Tracy among the most popular film stars in the country:

- 1937 - 18th (US)
- 1938 - 5th (US), 3rd (UK)
- 1939 - 3rd (US), 6th (UK)
- 1940 - 2nd (US), 3rd (UK)
- 1941 - 5th (US), 3rd (UK)
- 1942 - 10th (US), 3rd (UK)
- 1943 - 19th (US)
- 1944 - 5th (US), 9th (UK)
- 1945 - 5th (US), 7th (UK)
- 1946 - 21st (US)
- 1947 - 14th (US)
- 1948 - 9th (US)
- 1949 - 24th (US)
- 1950 - 9th (US)
- 1951 - 10th (US)

== See also ==
- List of awards and nominations received by Spencer Tracy
