= List of awards and nominations received by Spencer Tracy =

List of Spencer Tracy awards
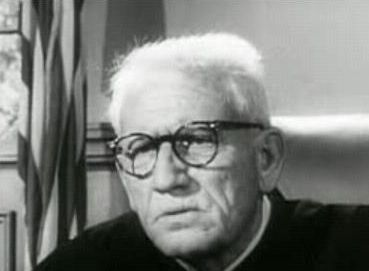
- Spencer Tracy
Award	Wins	Nominations
Academy Awards	2	9
BAFTA Awards	1	5
Golden Globe Awards	1	4
Cannes Film Festival Awards	1	1
Overall	5	19

Spencer Tracy (1900–1967) was an American actor. He appeared in 75 films from 1930 to 1967, during which time he received several awards and nominations from the industry. He was nominated for nine Academy Awards for Best Actor, a record he holds with Laurence Olivier, and won two: for Captains Courageous (1937), and Boys Town (1938). He was the first person to win consecutive awards in the Best Actor category, and this would not be matched until Tom Hanks received consecutive Best Actor awards in 1993 and 1994. Tracy received five British Academy Film Award nominations for Best Actor in a Leading Role, and four Golden Globe Award nominations for Best Actor – Motion Picture Drama. He won each of those awards once. He was also the recipient of the Best Actor prize at the Cannes Film Festival, and the National Board of Review Award for Best Actor.

== Awards and nominations ==
=== Academy Awards ===
Year	Category	Film	Result	Lost to
1936	Best Actor	San Francisco	Nominated	Paul Muni For The Story of Louis Pasteur
1937	Best Actor	Captains Courageous	Won	—
1938	Best Actor	Boys Town	Won	—
1950	Best Actor	Father of the Bride	Nominated	José Ferrer For Cyrano de Bergerac
1955	Best Actor	Bad Day at Black Rock	Nominated	Ernest Borgnine For Marty
1958	Best Actor	The Old Man and the Sea	Nominated	David Niven For Separate Tables
1960	Best Actor	Inherit the Wind	Nominated	Burt Lancaster For Elmer Gantry
1961	Best Actor	Judgment at Nuremberg	Nominated	Maximilian Schell For Judgment at Nuremberg
1967	Best Actor	Guess Who's Coming to Dinner	Nominated	Rod Steiger For In the Heat of the Night

=== BAFTA Award ===
Year	Category	Film	Result	Lost to
1953	Best Actor	The Actress	Nominated	Marlon Brando For Julius Caesar
1956	Best Actor	The Mountain	Nominated	François Périer For Gervaise
1958	Best Actor	The Last Hurrah	Nominated	Sidney Poitier For The Defiant Ones
1960	Best Actor	Inherit the Wind	Nominated	Jack Lemmon For The Apartment
1968	Best Actor	Guess Who's Coming to Dinner	Won	—

=== Golden Globe ===
Year	Category	Film	Result	Lost to
1953	Best Actor – Drama	The Actress	Won	—
1958	Best Actor – Drama	The Old Man and the Sea	Nominated	David Niven For Separate Tables
1960	Best Actor – Drama	Inherit the Wind	Nominated	Burt Lancaster For Elmer Gantry
1967	Best Actor – Drama	Guess Who's Coming to Dinner	Nominated	Rod Steiger For In the Heat of the Night

=== Cannes Film Festival ===
Year	Category	Film	Result	Lost to
1955	Cannes Film Festival Award for Best Actor	Bad Day at Black Rock	Won	—

== See also ==
- Spencer Tracy filmography
