= John Tracy Clinic =

Nonprofit organization in Los Angeles, US

Coordinates: 34.0292°N 118.2806°W

- Formation: 1942; 83 years ago
- Headquarters: 2160 West Adams Bl. Los Angeles, CA 90018
- Services: Center for children with hearing loss
- Founder: Louise Treadwell Tracy
- CEO, President: Cathleen Mathes

John Tracy Center (John Tracy Clinic dba John Tracy Center) is a private, nonprofit education center for infants and preschool children with hearing loss in Los Angeles, California. It was founded by Louise Treadwell Tracy, wife of actor Spencer Tracy, in 1942. The center provides parent-centered services worldwide. The organization has provided education and support for children with hearing loss and their families for over 70 years, with expertise in spoken language, called oralism.

The center offers worldwide family services, local family services, professional education, preschool, hearing testing, and more.

== History ==
Louise and Spencer Tracy's son, John, was diagnosed with nerve deafness in 1925; the cause of his deafness was Usher syndrome, which rendered him blind as an adult. His family never signed with him, when he went blind they traced letters into his hand instead of using the manual alphabet. They were initially told that nothing could be done to help it, but they continued looking for help. A specialist in New York told them John could live a “normal” life if he learned to lip read and talk. She then started an oralist daycare in 1942, next to the University of Southern California. The business incorporated into John Tracy Clinic the following year, with Walt Disney as one of the first board members alongside Spencer. Over the years it grew, developing a correspondence course in addition to on-site services to reach those who couldn't travel to them. In 1952 the clinic moved to more modern facilities.

Since its founding, JTC has helped more than 250,000 children develop speech, language and listening abilities. Today, JTC serves more than 3,200 children and families worldwide each year.

The organization is recognized as the leader in early childhood listening and spoken language education, as one of the top three centers for pediatric audiology in the Los Angeles area, and as the world’s largest private provider of services to young children with, or at risk of, hearing loss.
