= Lawrence Hazard =

American playwright and screenwriter

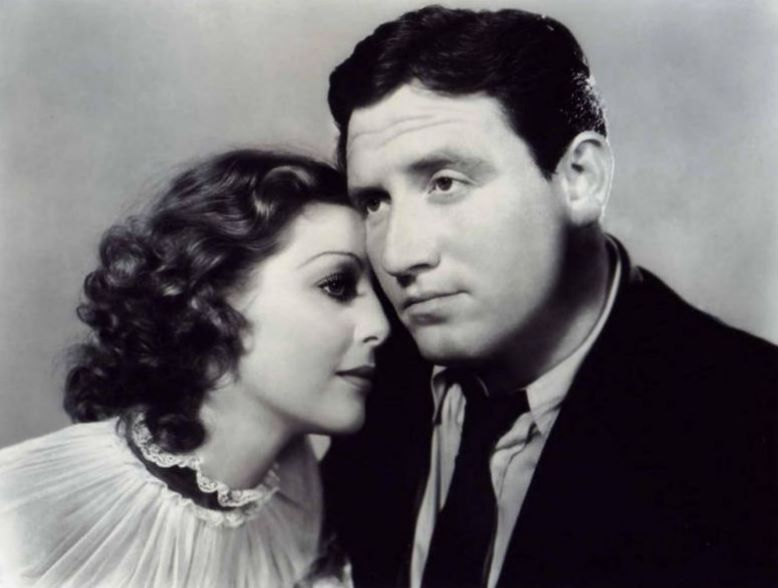
Young and Tracy in Man's Castle (1933)

Lawrence Hazard (May 12, 1897 – April 1, 1959) was an American playwright and screenwriter active between 1933 and 1958. He was born to Frederick H. Howard and resided for some time in New London, Connecticut. His career was cut short when he died at age 61 in 1959. His films include Man's Castle (1933) directed by Frank Borzage and starring Spencer Tracy and Loretta Young; Mannequin (1937) directed by Borzage and starring Joan Crawford and Spencer Tracy; Strange Cargo (1940) directed by Borzage and starring Clark Gable and Joan Crawford; The Spoilers (1942) starring Marlene Dietrich and John Wayne; Jackass Mail (1942) starring Wallace Beery; Dakota (1945) starring John Wayne and Walter Brennan, and numerous other films as well as scripts for television anthologies in the 1950s.

== Personal life ==
On March 16, 1933, Hazard married his wife, Nora. They divorced June 13, 1937 over Hazard's horse race gambling problem.

== Partial filmography ==
- Man's Castle (1933)
- Hello, Everybody! (1933)
- I'll Love You Always (1935)
- Hooray for Love (1935)
- Mannequin (1937)
- Thorough Breds Don't Cry (1937)
- Strange Cargo (1940)
- The Spoilers (1942)
- Jackass Mail (1942)
- Whistling in Dixie (1942)
- Gentle Annie (1944)
- Dakota (1945)
- She Went to the Races (1945)
- Wyoming (1947)
- The Fabulous Texan (1947)
