= Anna Kashfi =

British actress (1934–2015)

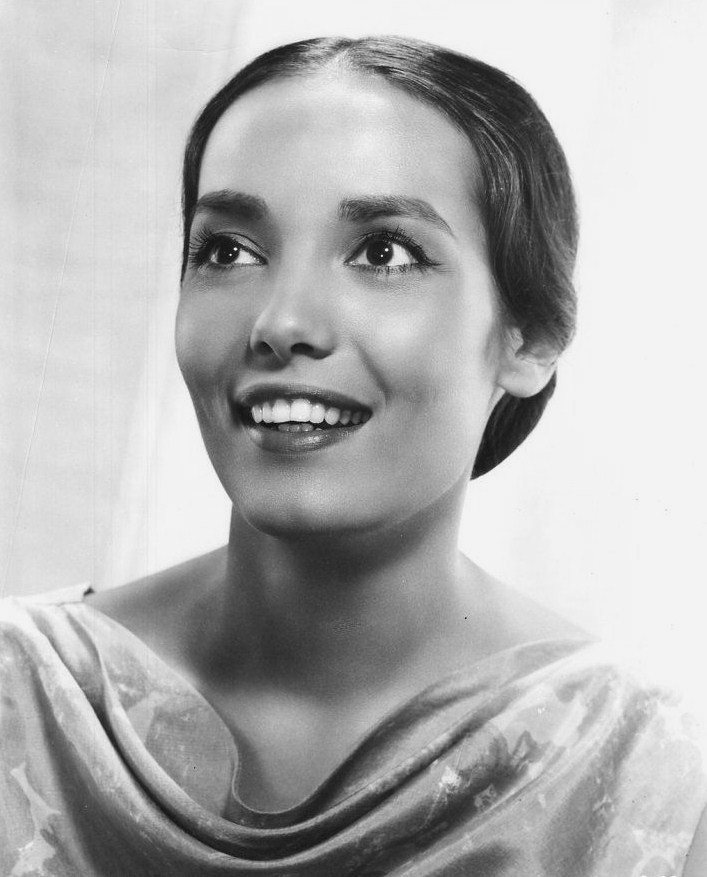
- Kashfi in Night of the Quarter Moon (1959)
- Born: Joan O'Callaghan; 30 September 1934; Calcutta, British India
- Died: 16 August 2015 (aged 80); Woodland, Washington, U.S.
- Resting place: Kalama IOOF Cemetery, Kalama, Washington, U.S.
- Occupations: Model; actress
- Years active: 1956–1963
- Spouses: Marlon Brando (m. 1957; div. 1959) James Hannaford (m. 1974; died 1986)
- Children: Christian Brando

Anna Kashfi (born Joan O'Callaghan; 30 September 1934 – 16 August 2015) was an Anglo-Indian actress who had a brief Hollywood career in the 1950s but was better known for her tumultuous marriage to film star Marlon Brando and the controversies surrounding their son.

== Early life ==
Kashfi was born in Kolkata, India, to William Patrick O'Callaghan, a traffic superintendent on the Indian State railways, and Martha Phoebe Melinda Shrieves. Her parents were Anglo-Indian. She was raised in Calcutta until she was 13, when the family relocated to Cardiff, Wales.

== Family background ==
By the age of 22, Joan O'Callaghan had transformed herself into the exotic "ethnic Indian" model and actress Anna Kashfi, using a name invented by her and Glyn Mortimer, the head of a London modelling agency. As Mortimer told Parade magazine for its 1959 investigation into Kashfi's past, "Kashfi was the name of a dear friend of mine. Joan picked the name Anna from Joanna, which she apparently had used from time to time".

The matter of Kashfi's ethnic heritage has remained in question due to conflicting claims. Despite Kashfi's parents claiming to be from London, they were both born in India to railway families who were already rooted in the South Asian country for over a century. Her father told Parade magazine in 1959 that Kashfi was born "to my wife in 1934 when I was employed by the Bengal-Nagupur railway as a station master". Parade stated that its investigation determined that "her baptismal certificate bears this out" and furthermore stated that she had a brother, Bosco Brian Patrick O'Callaghan, who was then attending a technical college in Cardiff.

However, upon her 1957 marriage to Marlon Brando a year after adopting her stage name, Kashfi failed to list either on her marriage license, instead stating her real father was one Devi Kashfi and biological mother named Selma Ghose. In a 14 October 1957, wedding day interview with The New York Times (entitled "Kashfi Still Enigma: License Does Not List Welsh Couple As Parents"), a friend of the bride was quoted as stating that Kashfi's purported Indian father had died six weeks before the ceremony. The reason Kashfi became estranged from her parents remains unclear.

Nevertheless, the O'Callaghans were adamant that Kashfi was their child, and William O'Callaghan was quoted in Time magazine as claiming, "That's our daughter, and both me and missus were born in London."

Parade reported that Kashfi might have selected the surname "Ghose" for her putative mother from the owners of The Maharajah, a London shop where she worked as a model. She also worked as a model in the London fur salon of Henry Noble in Regent Street.

When questioned earlier in life about her daughter's heritage, her mother had told the press "There is no Indian blood in my family or my husband's family". Film director Edward Dmytryk, who directed the actress in her first film, stated in a New York Times interview (titled "Kashfi Called Welsh") the day before her wedding to Brando that he knew her real surname was Irish but assumed she was half-Indian.

== Career ==
Upon her family's relocation to Wales, O'Callaghan worked as a waitress and in a butcher's shop in Cardiff before moving to London, where she became a model. She made her screen debut as an actress in 1956 in The Mountain (1956) for Paramount with Spencer Tracy and Robert Wagner. Using the stage name Anna Kashfi, the twenty-two-year-old played a Hindu girl. In her next film a year later, Battle Hymn (1957), she co-starred with Rock Hudson as a Korean girl. A year after that she played a Mexican in Cowboy (1958) with Glenn Ford and Jack Lemmon. Her next and last film during this period was Night of the Quarter Moon (1959), where she played the African American wife of singer Nat King Cole and for which she received the Best Supporting Actress Award at the Cartagena Film Festival in 1961. She made a few appearances on television, including the series Adventures in Paradise, though drug and alcohol problems reportedly contributed to the premature end of her acting career.

== Personal life ==
Kashfi married Marlon Brando, whom she had met in the summer of 1956, on 11 October 1957. They divorced a year and a half later on 22 April 1959. The pair was mutually verbally and physically abusive to each other. Kashfi was not only abusive to Brando, but she'd also be abusive to his secretary, Alice Marchak. "Even I was subject to physical attack, as well as the house with a table thrown through a floor to ceiling sliding glass window one day while Marlon was at work". "She would call, at times daily, but Marlon's instructions were he did not wish to take her call because it would result in a war of words and ruin his day. Therefore, I took her verbal abuse." She did not align with Brando politically, according to her book. "His accusations of genocide against the Indians ("murders, massacres, enforced starvation unprecedented in history. . . . This country was built on the blood and bones of the Indian race"), his deprecation of American motives ("The Hitler side in Vietnam"), and his general distortions of history have repelled many who might otherwise rally to his side".

They had a son, Christian Devi Brando (1958–2008), whom she called "Devi". Kashfi and Marlon fought bitterly over Christian, with Marlon eventually winning custody. Alice Marchak was Christian's legal guardian along with Brando. Kashfi's violence and alcohol abuse during Christian's childhood was part of the reason she lost custody of him. Kashfi allegedly paid $10,000 to have Christian kidnapped and take him to Baja California. He was later found living in a tent and ill with bronchitis.

In the 1990s, Christian was tried for killing his half-sister Cheyenne's boyfriend. Jailed for the crime, he later died of pneumonia in Los Angeles in 2008, aged 49. Kashfi wrote, and later admitted that she did, a false story in her book about how Alice Marchak was allegedly dating Brando's father, Marlon Brando, Sr. Kashfi called and apologized to Marchak after its publication, along with thanking her "for taking care of my son".

Kashfi married James Hannaford, a salesman, in 1974; they remained together until his death in 1986.

== Death ==
Kashfi died on 16 August 2015, in Woodland, Washington, aged 80.

== Books ==
- Anna K. Brando and E. P. Stein, Brando for Breakfast, Berkley Pub Group, 1979, ISBN 0-425-04698-2.

== Filmography ==
- The Mountain (1956) – Hindu Girl
- Battle Hymn (1957) – En-soon Yang
- Cowboy (1958) – Maria Vidal / Arriega
- Night of the Quarter Moon (1959) – Maria Robbin

== Television appearances ==
- Adventures in Paradise (1959) – Monique Le Febure
- The Deputy (1960) – Felipa
- Bronco (1960) – Princess Natula

== Bibliography ==
- Peter Manso, Brando. The Biography, Hyperion, New York, 1994, ISBN 0-7868-6063-4
