= Katharine Hepburn and Spencer Tracy =

Cinematic couple

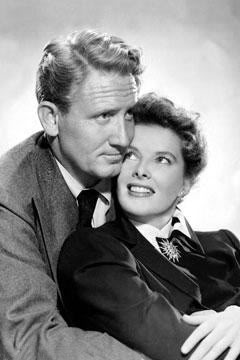
Tracy and Hepburn in a promotional photo for Without Love

Katharine Hepburn (1907–2003) and Spencer Tracy (1900–1967) starred in nine films together and had an affair—an open secret in Hollywood—that lasted 26 years, ending only with Tracy's death.

Allegedly when they first met, Hepburn said, "I fear I may be too tall for you, Mr. Tracy" or possibly "You know, Mr. Tracy, I'm afraid I'm a bit too tall for you." In one version, Tracy supposedly replied, "Don't worry, I'll cut you down to my size." In another, Joseph L. Mankiewicz reportedly said, "Don't worry, Kate, he'll cut you down to size."

They were initially cool to each other on their first production together, Woman of the Year, but that quickly dissipated, and within a week, they were calling each other Spence and Kate. Hepburn fell in love with Tracy. A common myth is that as a Catholic, he would not divorce his wife. Under California law in effect at the time, however, his wife, Louise, may have had grounds, but he did not. California did not adopt no fault divorce until January 1, 1970, after his death. (After Louise Tracy's death in 1983, Hepburn finally acknowledged their decades-long affair.) The normally fiercely independent Hepburn accommodated herself to Tracy, including seeing him through his periodic alcoholic relapses. They supposedly spent some of their time together in Tracy's bungalow suite at the Beverly Hills Hotel.

Tracy died shortly after completing their last film together, Guess Who's Coming to Dinner.

== Filmography ==
Year	Title	Tracy's role	Hepburn's role
1942	Woman of the Year	Sam Craig	Tess Harding
1942	Keeper of the Flame	Stephen O'Malley	Christine Forrest
1945	Without Love	Pat Jamieson	Jamie Rowan
1947	Sea of Grass	Col. James B. "Jim" Brewton	Lutie Cameron Brewton
1948	State of the Union	Grant Matthews	Mary Matthews
1949	Adam's Rib	Adam Bonner	Amanda Bonner
1952	Pat and Mike	Mike Conovan	Pat Pemberton
1957	Desk Set	Richard Sumner	Bunny Watson
1967	Guess Who's Coming to Dinner	Matt Drayton	Christina Drayton

== Biographies about the pair ==
- Tracy and Hepburn: an intimate memoir, by Garson Kanin
- An Affair to Remember: The Remarkable Love Story of Katharine Hepburn and Spencer Tracy, by Christopher Andersen
