= Night of the Quarter Moon =

1959 film by Hugo Haas

- Theatrical release poster
- Directed by: Hugo Haas
- Written by: Franklin Coen; Frank Davis
- Produced by: Albert Zugsmith
- Starring: Julie London; John Drew Barrymore; Anna Kashfi; Dean Jones; Agnes Moorehead; Nat King Cole
- Cinematography: Ellis W. Carter
- Edited by: Ben Lewis
- Music by: Albert Glasser
- Production company: Metro-Goldwyn-Mayer
- Distributed by: Metro-Goldwyn-Mayer
- Release date: March 4, 1959
- Running time: 96 minutes
- Country: United States
- Language: English
- Budget: $538,000
- Box office: $940,000

Night of the Quarter Moon is a 1959 American drama film directed by Hugo Haas and written by Franklin Coen and Frank Davis. The film stars Julie London, John Drew Barrymore, Anna Kashfi, Dean Jones, Agnes Moorehead and Nat King Cole. The film was released on March 4, 1959, by Metro-Goldwyn-Mayer. It was later re-released as The Color of Her Skin.

== Plot ==
A young man returns home with a new bride, but his family objects when they learn she is of mixed race.

== Cast ==
- Julie London as Ginny O'Sullivan Nelson
- John Drew Barrymore as Roderic "Chuck" Nelson
- Anna Kashfi as Maria Robbin
- Dean Jones as Lexington Nelson
- Agnes Moorehead as Cornelia Nelson
- Nat King Cole as Cy Robbin
- Ray Anthony as The Hotel Manager
- Jackie Coogan as Desk Sergeant Bragan
- Charles Chaplin Jr. as Young Thug
- Billy Daniels as Headwaiter
- Cathy Crosby as Singer
- James Edwards as Asa Tully
- Arthur Shields as Captain Tom O'Sullivan
- Edward Andrews as Clinton Page
- Robert Warwick as Judge
- Marguerite Belafonte as Hostess

== Production ==
The film was based on an original story by Frank Davis and Franklin Coen. Albert Zugsmith, who had a producing deal with MGM, bought it in September 1957. Zugsmith gave lead roles to John Drew Barrymore, who had been in the producer's High School Confidential, and Julie London.

== Reception ==
=== Box office ===
According to MGM records the movie earned $465,000 in the US and Canada and $475,000 elsewhere, making a loss to the studio of $146,000.

=== Critical ===
It was described by Mae Tinee in a Chicago Tribune review as, "one of the most inept films I've ever encountered [...] contrived and insulting to the intelligence [...] completely tasteless [...] sordid, sexy and senseless [...] contrived and ridiculous [...] a sheer waste of time."

== Awards ==
Anna Kashfi won the Best Supporting Actress Award at the Cartagena Film Festival in 1961.

== See also ==
- List of American films of 1959
- Rhinelander v. Rhinelander
