= Cowboy (1958 film) =

1958 film by Delmer Daves

- 1958 Theatrical Poster
- Directed by: Delmer Daves
- Screenplay by: Dalton Trumbo; Edmund H. North
- Based on: My Reminiscences as a Cowboy; 1930 novel by Frank Harris
- Produced by: Julian Blaustein
- Starring: Glenn Ford; Jack Lemmon; Anna Kashfi; Brian Donlevy
- Cinematography: Charles Lawton Jr.
- Edited by: Al Clark; William A. Lyon
- Music by: George Duning
- Color process: Technicolor
- Production company: Phoenix Pictures
- Distributed by: Columbia Pictures
- Release date: January 7, 1958
- Running time: 92 minutes
- Country: United States
- Language: English
- Box office: $1.6 million

Cowboy is a 1958 American Western film directed by Delmer Daves and starring Glenn Ford, Jack Lemmon, Anna Kashfi and Brian Donlevy. This film is an adaptation of Frank Harris's 1930 semi-autobiographical novel My Reminiscences as a Cowboy. It was Lemmon's sole apperance in a Western, with his character based on Harris. The opening animated title sequence was created by Saul Bass. The screenwriters were Edmund H. North and Dalton Trumbo - the latter received no screen credit at the time because he had been blacklisted as one of the Hollywood Ten.

== Plot ==
Frank Harris is a Chicago hotel clerk who dreams of making his fortune in the cattle business and has also fallen in love with Maria, the daughter of hotel guest and Mexican cattle baron Señor Vidal. When Vidal finds out about the relationship, he orders Harris to stay away and arranges to return immediately to Mexico with his daughter.

Meanwhile, Tom Reece finishes a cattle drive and takes over an entire wing of the hotel, as usual. He makes a deal to buy cattle from Vidal in Mexico. However, when Reece loses his money in a poker game, Harris sees his opportunity to better himself (and see Maria again) – he offers his entire life savings for a partnership in Reece's next drive, including his joining the drive. Reece in desperation accepts on the basis that the profits are shared 50:50.

The next morning, when Harris shows up, Reece tries to renege, not wanting to burden himself with an inexperienced greenhorn as a partner, but Harris holds him to their deal. As they travel to Vidal's ranch, the cowboy life on the trail is not what Harris had envisioned. Harris is upset when one of the hands is killed by a rattlesnake bite during some fooling around by two other hands. Reece, still upset about having Harris along, continues to treat him harshly, but Harris toughens up and Reece starts taking a liking to him.

When they reach their destination, Harris is devastated to learn that Maria has been married off by her father to Don Manuel Arriega. When Arriega sees them together, he warns Harris to keep away. During a fiesta, Arriega performs a dangerous stunt, placing a ring on a bull's horn from his horse, and challenges the Americans to do the same. Harris takes up his challenge, but Reece intercedes to protect Harris from himself. Reece confronts the bull on foot so as not to endanger his horse and succeeds in the task.

On the cattle drive back to Chicago, Maria's marriage eats away at Harris. He becomes as callous and hostile to others as Reece had previously been to him. At one point, Reece stampedes the herd in order to save Harris from a Comanche ambush while he is out alone rounding up strays. Reece is shot in the knee, and Harris takes over as trail boss while he recovers. Harris tells Reece that the 200 head of cattle that were lost in the stampede are all coming out of Reece's share. Harris drives the men hard. Reece offers advice, but Harris refuses to listen. When one of the hands, a former US marshal, kills one of his friends while drinking together and then takes his own life, Harris callously orders the men back to work. Later Reece saves Harris's life after he foolishly enters a crowded cattle car on the train where one steer is lying down and in danger of being trampled. Knowing Reece has saved him, Harris snaps out of his resentful mood and suggests that the lost cattle be shared 50/50.

At the end of the drive, they boisterously take over part of the hotel where Harris used to work.

== Cast ==
- Glenn Ford as Tom Reese
- Jack Lemmon as Frank Harris
- Anna Kashfi as Maria Vidal, then Arriega
- Dick York as Charlie, trail hand
- King Donovan as Joe Capper, trail hand
- Brian Donlevy as Doc Bender, trail hand
- Víctor Manuel Mendoza as Paco Mendoza, ramrod
- Richard Jaeckel as Paul Curtis
- Vaughn Taylor as Mr. Fowler, Chicago hotel manager
- Donald Randolph as Señor Vidal, Maria's father
- James Westerfield as Mike Adams
- Eugene Iglesias as Don Manuel Arriega
- Frank DeKova as Alcalde
- Strother Martin as Snakebite Victim (uncredited)

== Home media ==
The film was released on DVD in Region 1 by Sony Pictures Home Entertainment on May 14, 2002. The film was released on Blu-Ray from Twilight Time, albeit in a limited quantity on February 16, 2016.

== Award nominations ==
Al Clark and William A. Lyon were nominated for the Academy Award for Best Film Editing in 1958, while Daves was nominated for a Directors Guild of America Award for Outstanding Directorial Achievement in Motion Pictures.

== See also ==
- List of American films of 1958
