= Louise Tracy =

American deaf education activist (1896–1983)

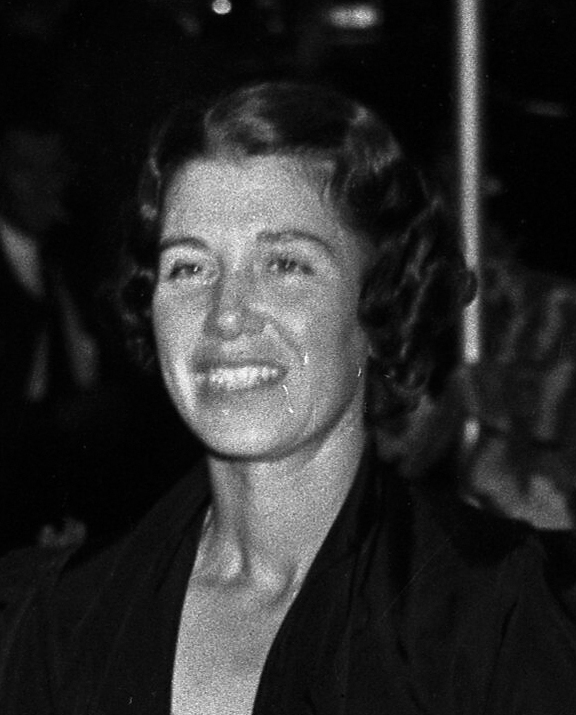
- Louise Tracy, 1937
- Born: Louise Ten Broeck Treadwell; July 31, 1896; New Castle, Pennsylvania, U.S.
- Died: November 13, 1983 (aged 87); Los Angeles, California, U.S.
- Education: Lake Erie College
- Spouse: Spencer Tracy (m. 1923; sep. 1933)
- Children: 2

Louise Ten Broeck Tracy (née Treadwell; July 31, 1896 – November 13, 1983) was the American founder of the John Tracy Clinic, a private, non-profit education center for the deaf that began in 1942. She was married to actor Spencer Tracy.

== Family ==
Tracy was born in New Castle, Pennsylvania. Her parents were Alliene Wetmore Treadwell and his wife Bright, née Smith. Alliene Treadwell was a prominent attorney and part owner of the New Castle Daily News in New Castle. Tracy's parents divorced when she was a teenager.

Tracy sought a career in vaudeville in 1914, but after less than a year in New York City she returned to New Castle and taught dancing. After graduating from Lake Erie College in 1917, she worked for a newspaper and taught school while she pursued a career as a stage actor, primarily in stock companies. In early March 1923, Louise joined the Leonard Wood Players in White Plains, New York, which engaged her as the leading lady. There, she met actor Spencer Tracy, who had also joined the company. On September 12, 1923, Louise and Spencer were married in Cincinnati.

On June 26, 1924, Louise and Spencer's first child, John, was born. Nine months later, Louise discovered that John was hard of hearing. Early in 1926 Louise met a deaf woman at a contract bridge party who could lip read very well, encouraging Louise that John might have a typical life in spite of his deafness. She took John to a hearing specialist, who confirmed the deafness was sensorineural, cause unknown. The doctor told Louise that even though there was no medical treatment, John could still learn how to talk, lip read, and do anything a hearing person could do.

With new hope, Louise began working with John, using material from different schools. In 1927, John spoke the word "Mama" for the first time. In June 1927, John was enrolled in the Wright Oral School for the deaf in New York City. At three years of age, he was the youngest child they had ever accepted.

In the summer of 1930, Spencer Tracy went to Hollywood to make his first film. John and Louise also traveled to Hollywood while Spencer was filming. On the train back to New York, John was struck with polio.

In July 1932, the Tracys' daughter Susie was born, and by March 1935, the family moved to a ranch in Encino, California, where they lived for 19 years. During the 1930s, Louise and Spencer both began playing polo and became accomplished players.

Spencer and Louise separated in 1933, though they reconciled in 1935. There was never again an official separation between Tracy and his wife, but the marriage continued to be troubled. Tracy increasingly lived in hotels and by the 1940s, the two were effectively living separate lives. Throughout their marriage, Spencer frequently engaged in extramarital affairs, including those with actresses Loretta Young, Joan Crawford, Myrna Loy, Ingrid Bergman, and Gene Tierney.

In 1942, Spencer co-starred with actress Katharine Hepburn in the film Woman of the Year. The pair famously began a long-term romantic relationship that lasted until Spencer's death in 1967. During this time, Spencer and Louise became estranged, but they never divorced. When he died, he left his entire estate, worth around US$500,000 (equivalent to $4,828,000 in 2025), to her, their two children, and his brother.

== The John Tracy Clinic ==
In July 1942, Louise Tracy spoke for the first time on her experience as the mother of a deaf child at the University of Southern California at a banquet for the National Workshop of Social Workers and teachers and Parents of the Hard of Hearing. Louise spoke frequently and with increasing skill to numerous clubs and groups. It was during this time, that she and a group of mothers of deaf children decided to start a school in Los Angeles for young deaf children and their parents. The John Tracy Clinic, named after her son, was the result.

During the first years of the John Tracy Clinic, and particularly the first few months, Louise established many of the aspects of the clinic's philosophy. She stressed the importance of parents being involved in the education of their children at a very young age and set up a program for them. Louise firmly believed that the clinic should offer both information and support at no charge to make them more accessible to children and families in need; as such, many of the clinic's services were free, including hearing screenings and services for families to better help care for their deaf children. The John Tracy Clinic was also the first preschool in the nation to offer free emotional support and information for families; aside from those services, it also offered families affected by deafness a sense of community.

Louise's husband Spencer supported her work with the clinic and was its sole financial support in the beginning. In April 1951, Spencer turned the world premiere of his new film, Father's Little Dividend, at Grauman's Egyptian Theatre in Hollywood, into a building fund-raiser for the clinic's new site. Spencer's support was always strong, and over the years he personally donated more than a half a million dollars to the clinic. His admiration for his wife was another constant. At the dedication of the new clinic building in 1952, he said to the visiting dignitaries, staff and press:

"You honor me because I am a movie actor, a star in Hollywood terms. Well, there's nothing I've ever done that can match what Louise has done for deaf children and their parents."

== Recognition ==
Louise Tracy was honored with many awards during the 1950s. These included the Hearing Advancement Award from the Lions Club Hearing Foundation in 1951, the Testimonial of Merit/Woman of the Year award from the La Sertoma International organization in 1953, and the Sixth Annual Award of the Save the Children Foundation in 1955.

Louise was also lauded in academic circles. In quick succession, she was granted honorary degrees from Northwestern University in Evanston, Illinois, the University of Southern California in Los Angeles, her alma mater Lake Erie College, and MacMurray College in Jacksonville, Illinois. In 1966, Gallaudet College, the liberal arts college for the deaf in Washington, DC, honored Louise with a Doctor of Letters degree. In 1974, she was granted a Doctor of Humane Letters degree from Whitworth College in Spokane, Washington. In 1976, Louise was honored with a Doctor of Humane Letters degree from Ripon College, Spencer's alma mater, in Ripon, Wisconsin.

Louise Tracy's influence in governmental circles continued in the 1960s. In 1963, Louise was appointed to the Neurological and Sensory Disease Advisory Committee of the federal Department of Housing, Education, and Welfare (HEW). In 1965, she became a member of the National Advisory Board of the National Technical Institute for the Deaf (NTID) in Henrietta, New York. Also in 1965, she was appointed to a four-year term as a member of the National Advisory Council on Vocational Rehabilitation. In 1969, Louise became a member of the President's Task Force on the Physically Handicapped.

The John Tracy Clinic continued to expand in the 1970s. In October 1974, Louise resigned as clinic director due to ill health. However, the honors continued to roll in for Louise, whose "mothers' group" had become the largest single service provider to parents of deaf children around the world. In 1974, she was presented with the 1974 Award of Honor Otolaryngology and in 1975 the Father Flanagan Award for Service to Youth from the Boys Town organization. In 1977, Louise was given the Humanitarian Award by the National Auxiliary of American Veterans AMVETS.

== Death ==
Louise Tracy died in Santa Monica, California, on November 13, 1983, at the age of 87. Her son John died on June 15, 2007.
