= Captains Courageous (1937 film) =

1937 film by Victor Fleming

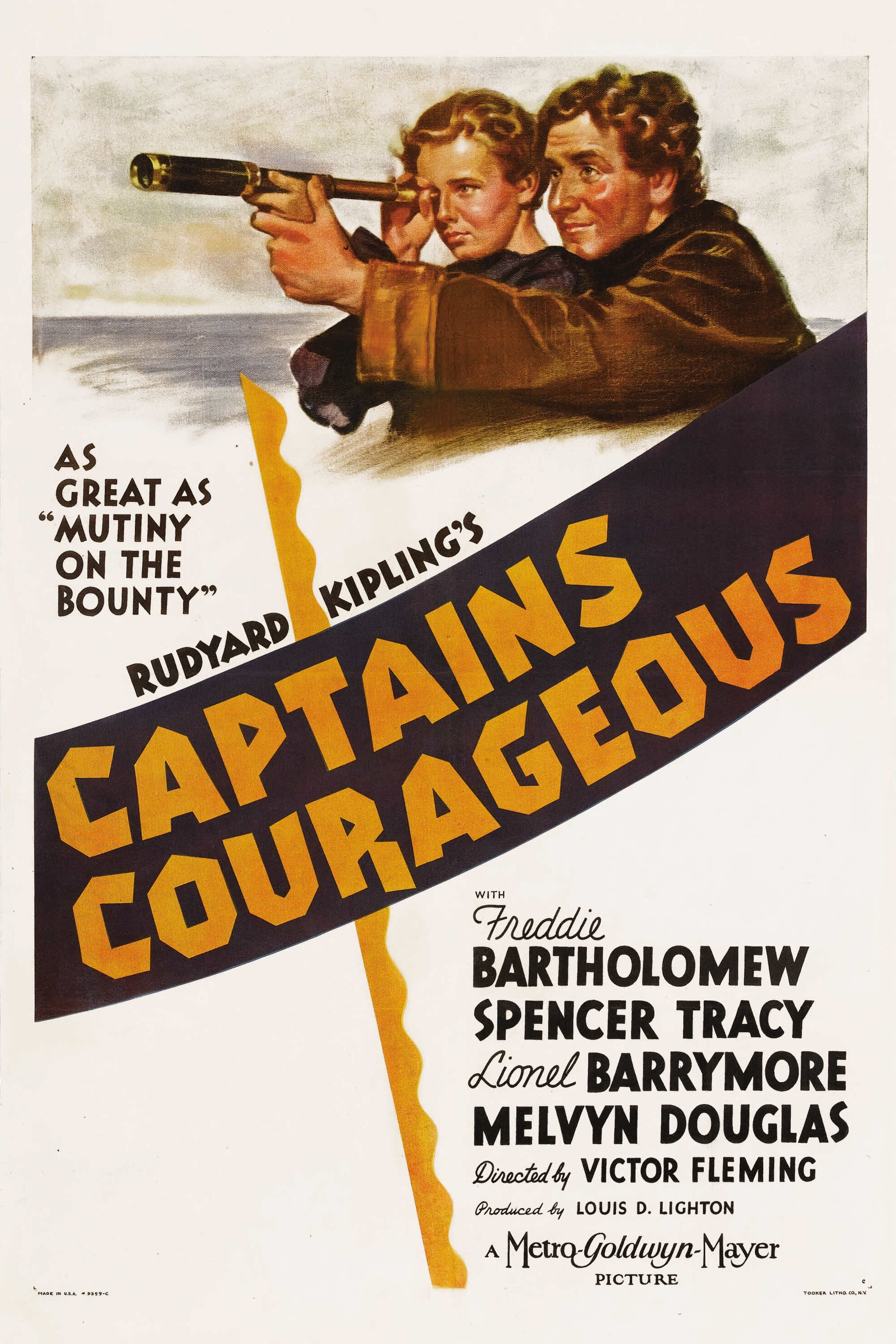
- Film poster
- Directed by: Victor Fleming
- Screenplay by: John Lee Mahin; Marc Connelly; Dale Van Every
- Based on: Captains Courageous; 1897 novel by Rudyard Kipling
- Produced by: Louis D. Lighton
- Starring: Freddie Bartholomew; Spencer Tracy; Lionel Barrymore; Melvyn Douglas
- Cinematography: Harold Rosson
- Edited by: Elmo Veron
- Music by: Franz Waxman
- Production company: Metro-Goldwyn-Mayer
- Distributed by: Loew's Inc.
- Release dates: May 11, 1937 (New York City, premiere); June 25, 1937 (United States)
- Running time: 117 minutes
- Country: United States
- Language: English
- Budget: $1.6 million
- Box office: $3.1 million

Captains Courageous is a 1937 American adventure drama film starring Freddie Bartholomew, Spencer Tracy, Lionel Barrymore and Melvyn Douglas. Based on the 1897 novel of the same name by Rudyard Kipling, the film had its world premiere at the Carthay Circle Theatre in Los Angeles.

Directed by Victor Fleming, it was produced by Louis D. Lighton and made by Metro-Goldwyn-Mayer. Filmed in black and white, Captains Courageous was advertised by MGM as a coming-of-age classic with exciting action sequences.

The film was nominated for four Academy Awards, with Spencer Tracy winning the Best Actor Oscar for his portrayal of the simple but caring fisherman Manuel. Backgrounds and exteriors for the film, which updated the story's setting to the mid-1920s, were shot on location in Port aux Basques, Newfoundland and Shelburne, Nova Scotia in Canada, and Gloucester, Massachusetts in the United States.

== Plot ==
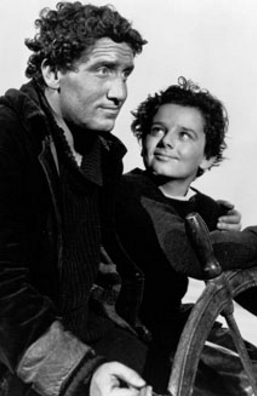
Spencer Tracy and Freddie Bartholomew as Manuel and Harvey

Harvey Cheyne is the spoiled son of American business tycoon Frank Burton Cheyne. Harvey is shunned by his classmates at a private boarding school, and eventually suspended for bad behavior. Seeking to close the gap between them, Frank takes Harvey on a business trip to Europe, travelling there by trans-Atlantic steamship. A few days into the voyage, Harvey falls overboard in the Grand Banks of Newfoundland. He is rescued by a fisherman, Manuel Fidello, and taken aboard the fishing schooner We're Here, from Gloucester, Massachusetts.

The schooner's captain, Disko Troop, doesn't believe Harvey's claims about his father's wealth, and refuses to take Harvey back to New York. To Harvey's shock, he intends fishing on the Grand Banks for three more months. Captain Troop offers Harvey temporary crew membership until they return to port. Harvey is reluctant to do real work but prodded by Manuel, a proud but simple Portuguese immigrant, eventually accepts. Befriended also by Captain Troop's son, Dan, he becomes acclimated to the demanding fishing lifestyle. Harvey begins to partner with Manuel in his dory. When a prank of Harvey's causes a fish hook to lodge in a crewman's arm, Manuel defends the boy. The We're Here fills with fish and turns for home.

During the climactic race back to Gloucester against a rival schooner, the Jennie Cushman, Manuel climbs to the top of the mast to furl the sail. The mast cracks and he is plunged into the icy sea, tangled in the rigging. The weight of the broken mast and rigging threaten to capsize the ship. Manuel speaks to the cook in Portuguese, and the cook tells Captain Troop that all the bottom half of Manuel is gone, and Manuel doesn't want the boy to see. Manuel tells Captain Troop to cut the rigging free, knowing he will drown with it. Harvey crawls out on the wreckage, crying and distraught, while Captain Troop wields an axe. Finally Manuel kisses the cross around his neck and sinks below the water. We're Here returns to port and Harvey is reunited with his father Frank, who is impressed by his son's maturity. Harvey grieves for Manuel, pushing Frank away and wanting to stay on the We're Here, but Troop reassures Frank, telling him that there is room in Harvey's heart for both men and that once there Frank "will find Manuel mighty satisfactory company." At the church, Harvey lights two candles, one from Manuel to Manuel's father and one from him to Manuel. Frank overhears Harvey praying that someday he will be with Manuel again and follows the boy to Manuel's dory, floating near the ship. Harvey is inconsolable and begs Frank to leave him alone.

The next day, in front of the Fisherman's Memorial, Harvey and Frank join the community in casting bouquets and wreaths on the outgoing tide in tribute to the souls lost during this fishing season. The last shot shows the Cheynes' car speeding down the road with Manuel's dory on a trailer behind. Through the side window we see Harvey gesturing animatedly and his father laughing, regaled with stories of Harvey's adventures.

== Cast ==
- Freddie Bartholomew as Harvey Cheyne
- Spencer Tracy as Manuel Fidello
- Lionel Barrymore as Captain Disko Troop
- Melvyn Douglas as Frank Burton Cheyne
- Charley Grapewin as Uncle Salters
- Mickey Rooney as Dan Troop
- John Carradine as "Long Jack"
- Oscar O'Shea as Captain Walt Cushman
- Jack La Rue as Priest (credited as Jack LaRue)
- Walter Kingsford as Dr. Finley
- Donald Briggs as Bob Tyler
- Sam McDaniel as "Doc" (credited as Sam McDaniels)
- Bill Burrud as Charles Jamison (credited as Billy Burrud)
- Gladden James as Secretary Cobb (uncredited)
- Frank Sully as taxi driver (uncredited)
- Billy Gilbert as soda steward (uncredited)
- Charles Coleman as Burns, the butler (uncredited)
- Lester Dorr as corridor steward (uncredited)

== Reception ==
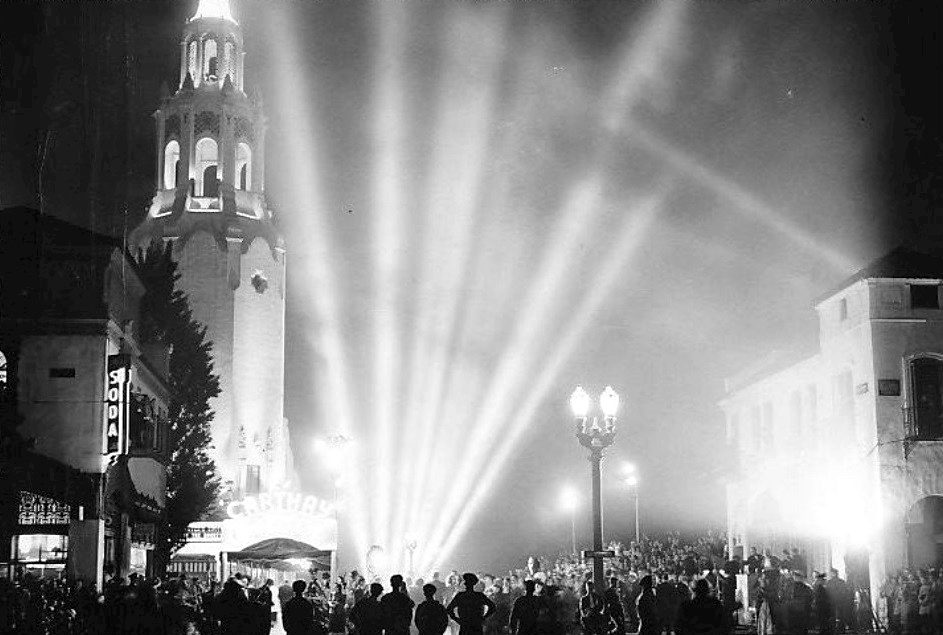
Los Angeles premiere of Captains Courageous (May 17, 1937)

Frank S. Nugent of The New York Times called the film "another of those grand jobs of movie-making we have come to expect of Hollywood's most prodigal studio. With its rich production, magnificent marine photography, admirable direction and performances, the film brings vividly to life every page of Kipling's novel and even adds an exciting chapter or two of its own." Variety reported that the Kipling story had "been given splendid production, performance, photography and dramatic composition." Harrison's Reports wrote, "Excellent! It is the type of entertainment that audiences will not forget soon, for its spiritual beauty makes a deep impression on one." John Mosher of The New Yorker called it "as rich a film as you will see this spring ... The picture is magnificent as a sketch of storm and struggle on the ocean."

== Box office ==
According to MGM records the film earned $1,688,000 in the US and Canada and $1,445,000 elsewhere resulting in a profit of $355,000.

== Awards ==
Spencer Tracy won the Academy Award for Best Actor for his work in this film. The movie was also nominated for three other Academy Awards:

- Best Picture – Louis D. Lighton, producer
- Best Film Editing – Elmo Veron
- Best Writing, Screenplay – Marc Connelly, John Lee Mahin and Dale Van Every

A VHS edition of the 1937 film was released by MGM Home Video in 1990 followed by Warner Home Video's DVD of the film on January 31, 2006. Warner Archive Collection will be released this film on Blu-ray for the first time on April 28, 2026, featuring a 4K digital restoration from the best preservation elements and a special features ported over the 2006 DVD release.

The film is recognized by American Film Institute in these lists:

- 2006: AFI's 100 Years...100 Cheers – #94

== In popular culture ==
Holden Caulfield, protagonist of the 1951 J.D. Salinger novel The Catcher in the Rye, is thought to look like Harvey Cheyne, as in the book a prostitute tells Caulfield that he looks like the boy who falls off a boat in a film costarring Melvyn Douglas, though the film is not mentioned by name.

In Kurt Vonnegut's 1987 book Bluebeard, Rabo Karabekian tells Circe Berman that his father died in a movie theater while watching Captains Courageous.

Chris Elliott has stated that Captains Courageous was the inspiration for the film Cabin Boy.

== See also ==
- Lionel Barrymore filmography
- Spencer Tracy filmography
