= Man's Castle =

1933 film by Frank Borzage

- Movie poster
- Directed by: Frank Borzage
- Screenplay by: Jo Swerling
- Based on: Man's Castle play by Lawrence Hazard
- Starring: Spencer Tracy; Loretta Young; Glenda Farrell; Arthur Hohl; Walter Connolly; Marjorie Rambeau; Dickie Moore
- Cinematography: Joseph H. August
- Edited by: Viola Lawrence
- Music by: W. Franke Harling
- Distributed by: Columbia Pictures
- Release date: October 27, 1933
- Running time: 78 minutes (original 1933 release)/66 minutes (censored 1938 re-release)
- Country: United States
- Language: English

Man's Castle is a 1933 pre-Code American film directed by Frank Borzage and starring Spencer Tracy and Loretta Young.

== Plot ==
Well-dressed Bill takes pity on Trina, a hungry young woman he meets in a city park and treats her to a dinner in a fancy restaurant. After she is finished, he informs the manager he has no money. He then raises such a ruckus that the manager is all too willing to let them go. When Bill learns that Trina is also homeless, he lets her stay at his ramshackle home in a shanty town. Among their neighbors and friends are widowed former preacher Ira and Flossie, an alcoholic older woman Ira is trying to reform.

Bill is a wandering sort, unwilling to live in the same place too long. Trina falls in love with him, but wisely makes no demands that will make him feel trapped in their developing relationship. When she longs for a new stove, he raises the down payment by serving a summons on Fay La Rue, the star of a show. Far from resenting it, Fay wants him for a playmate. He is tempted, but turns her down. Just as Bill's restless nature starts becoming too much for him, Trina tells him she is pregnant. Ira presides at Bill and Trina's wedding.

Before hitting the road by himself, Bill decides to get enough money to support his wife and future child. He agrees to help slimy neighbor Bragg rob the payroll from a toy factory where Bragg used to work. Ira, the night watchman, shoots Bill before recognizing him, but it is only a flesh wound. Wanting Trina for himself, Bragg turns on the burglar alarm, but Bill gets away with Ira's help. Back home, Trina dresses the wound. Flossie suggests that Bill take Trina away with him, solving Bill's dilemma. After they leave, Bragg threatens to set the police on their track, but Flossie silences him with Ira's gun.

== Cast ==
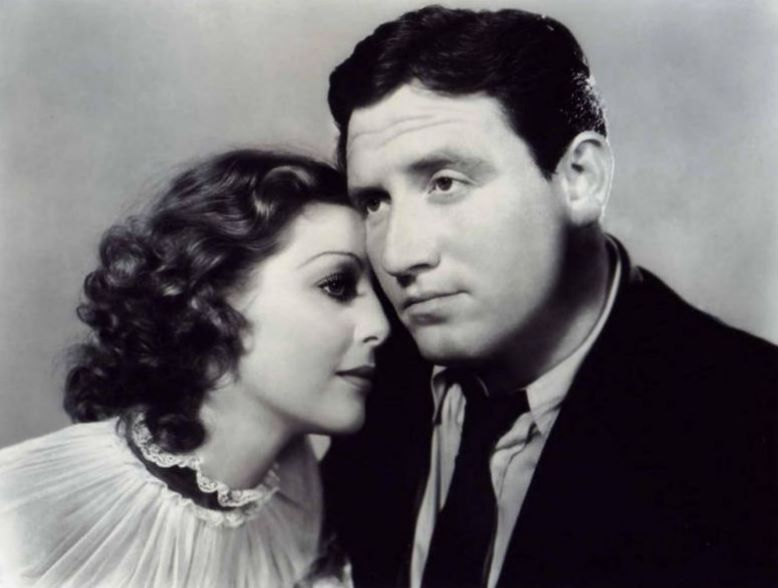
Loretta Young and Spencer Tracy

- Spencer Tracy as Bill
- Loretta Young as Trina
- Marjorie Rambeau as Flossie
- Glenda Farrell as Fay La Rue
- Walter Connolly as Ira
- Arthur Hohl as Bragg
- Dickie Moore as Joie

== Production ==
=== Censored 1938 reissue and subsequent restoration ===
Columbia re-released the film in 1938, to take advantage of Tracy's much greater popularity. However, with the Production Code in full force, the Hays Office mandated twelve minutes of cuts in order to win a seal of approval. This resulted in a number of blatantly obvious jump cuts where racy dialogue has been removed, as well as the deletion of a shot of a nude Young (or more likely a stunt double) diving into the river. Additionally, the wedding scene was moved from the seventh reel to the first reel, in order to make it appear that the characters were already married when they shacked up together; this caused continuity problems. In 2023, the film was restored in 4K by Sony Pictures Entertainment at Cineric laboratory, using the original 1933 35mm nitrate negative, a 1938 nitrate dupe negative, and a 35mm nitrate print loaned by the BFI National Archive. The audio restoration was performed by Deluxe Audio Services using the original mono track negative, a composite dupe negative, and a nitrate print. Color grading was completed at Roundabout Entertainment laboratory by Christian Lamie. The restoration was supervised by Rita Belda. The running time of the restored version is 78 minutes. The restored version was released on Blu-ray by Sony Pictures Home Entertainment on May 21, 2024.

== Reception ==
Mordaunt Hall wrote in The New York Times, "Even though Frank Borzage in his direction of Man's Castle, ... gives an occasional fleeting reminder of his successful silent film, Seventh Heaven the story is by no means as plausible or as poetic as that memorable old work. ... Man's Castle can, however, boast of the thoroughly efficient portrayals of Spencer Tracy and Loretta Young, particularly Mr. Tracy's. Their work results in much of the narrative being quite interesting and several of the scenes are blessed with touches of originality."

The film's box office performance was described as "dismal".

In 1998, Jonathan Rosenbaum of the Chicago Reader included the film in his unranked list of the best American films not included on the AFI Top 100.
