= Mannequin (1937 film) =

1937 film by Frank Borzage

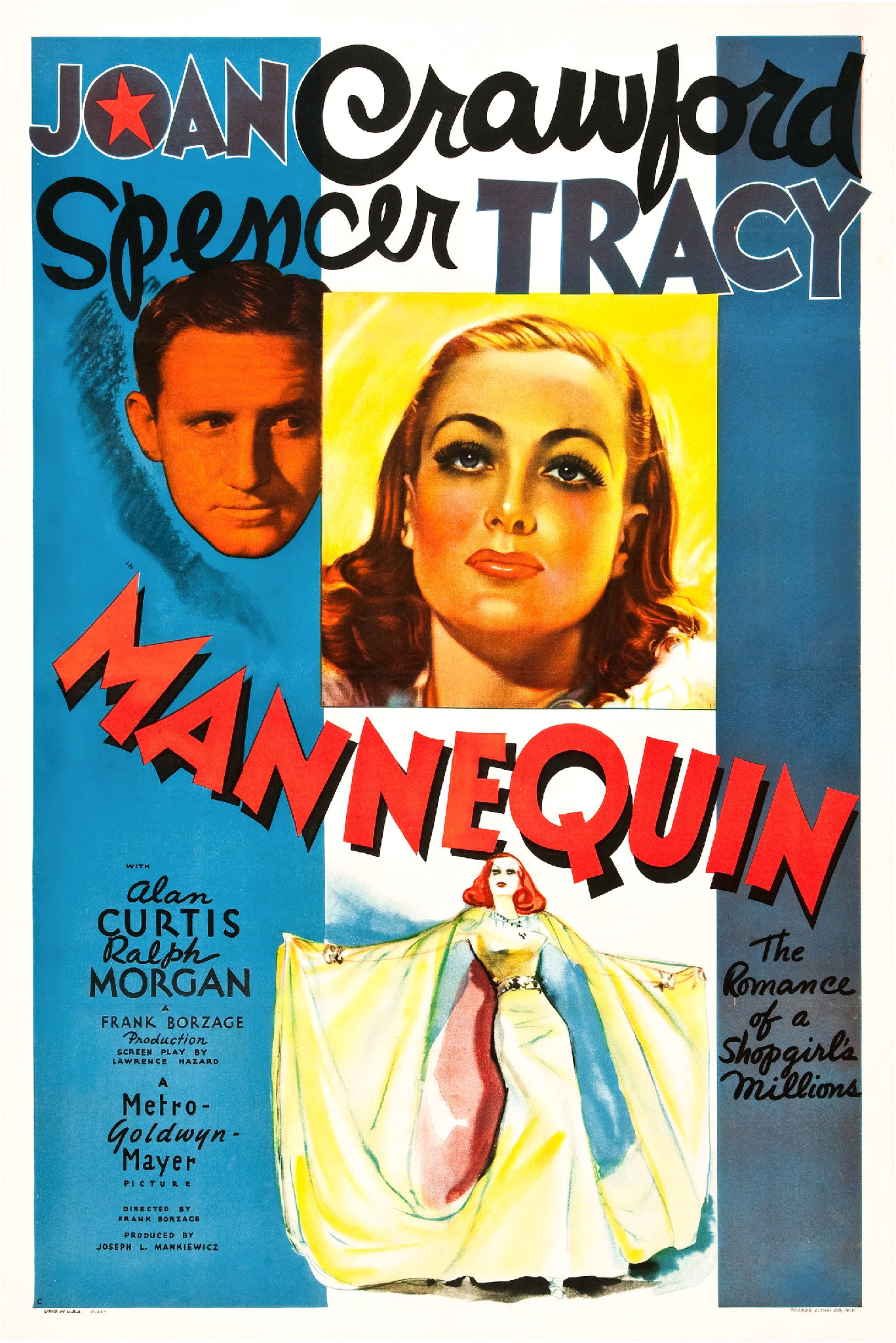
- Original Film Poster
- Directed by: Frank Borzage
- Written by: Lawrence Hazard
- Story by: Katharine Brush
- Produced by: Joseph L. Mankiewicz; Frank Borzage (uncredited)
- Starring: Joan Crawford; Spencer Tracy; Alan Curtis
- Cinematography: George J. Folsey
- Edited by: Fredrick Y. Smith
- Music by: Edward Ward
- Production company: Metro-Goldwyn-Mayer
- Distributed by: Loew's Inc.
- Release date: December 14, 1937
- Running time: 95 minutes
- Country: United States
- Language: English
- Budget: $595,000
- Box office: $1,634,000

Mannequin is a 1937 American drama film directed by Frank Borzage and starring Joan Crawford, Spencer Tracy, and Alan Curtis. Crawford plays Jessie, a young working class woman who seeks to improve her life by marrying her boyfriend, only to find out that he is no better than what she left behind. She meets a self-made millionaire with whom she falls in love despite his financial problems.

The film premiered on December 14, 1937, in Westwood, Los Angeles, California. It opened on January 20, 1938, in New York City, followed by a wide American release on January 21, 1938.

== Plot ==
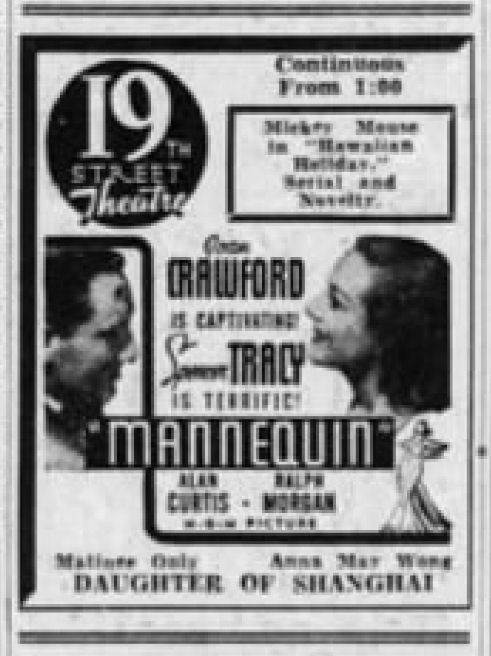
Newspaper ad

Jessie Cassidy yearns to escape the squalor of her family's Lower East Side apartment. Hoping to move up in life, she convinces her boyfriend, Eddie Miller, to marry her. At their wedding reception self-made shipping tycoon John L. Hennessey sees the couple and buys them a bottle of champagne. Eddie tries to impress John, but Jessie impresses him more.

Eddie takes Jessie to a nice apartment, then tells her that she can give up her job as a shopgirl to work in the chorus of a Broadway show, just until he gets a break. Several months later, Jessie is still in love, despite her friend Beryl Lee's warnings that Eddie is good-for-nothing. Hennessey throws a party for the cast of the Broadway show and Eddie convinces the reluctant Jessie to go.

Hennessey, who has been giving parties only on the pretext of seeing Jessie, makes a pass at her, which she rebukes with a slap. Even more enamoured with her after this, he doesn't hesitate to loan her a hundred dollars after she and Eddie are kicked out of their apartment. As it turns out, the apartment belonged to other people and Eddie is arrested for bookmaking.

Eddie, aware of Hennessey's love for Jessie, suggests that she divorce him, marry Hennessey, then divorce Hennessey for a large settlement. Finally seeing what kind of man Eddie is, Jessie leaves him. Some months later, she returns the money to Hennessey and they start to see each other. She promises to marry him, even though he knows she doesn't love him. They later plan a European trip. Eddie goes to Jessie and warns her to carry through his idea, but when Hennessey arrives, he throws Eddie out, even though he does not know the real purpose of his visit.

After they marry, Jessie realizes that she loves Hennessey and is completely happy in their honeymoon cottage in Ireland. They soon receive a cablegram from Hennessey's assistant Briggs, advising them that labor unrest necessitates their return to the United States.

While Hennessey goes to his men, hoping that they will stop their strike and save their company, Jessie confronts Eddie. He tries to blackmail her, but she says that she will leave Hennessey and flee before seeing him hurt.

Just before she is about to leave him, however, Hennessey comes home and Jessie lies that she never loved him. Eddie then walks in and announces that Hennessey is now broke and "in the gutter" just like him. He also tells Hennessey about the plan for Jessie to marry and divorce him for money. Eddie then leaves and Hennessey refuses to listen to Jessie's word that she loves him. Later, however, she convinces him that she will stay by his side no matter what and that the money from the sale of her jewels will give them a new start.

== Cast ==
- Joan Crawford as Jessie Cassidy
- Spencer Tracy as John L. Hennessey
- Alan Curtis as Eddie Miller
- Ralph Morgan as Briggs
- Mary Philips as Beryl Lee
- Oscar O'Shea as 'Pa' Cassidy
- Elisabeth Risdon as 'Ma' Cassidy
- Leo Gorcey as Clifford Cassidy
- Gwen Lee as Flo
- George Chandler as "Swing" Magoo
- Bert Roach as Mr. Schwartz
- Marie Blake as Mrs. Schwartz
- Matt McHugh as Mike
- Paul Fix as Smooch Hanrahan
- Helen Troy as Bubbles Adair
- Donald Kirke as Dave McIntyre
- Phillip Terry as Man Outside Stage Door

== Reception ==
Frank Nugent in The New York Times remarked, "Mannequin...restores Miss Joan Crawford to her throne as queen of the working girls....Miss Crawford, let it be said, meets these several dramatic emergencies in her best manner, which, as you know, is tender, strong, heroic, and regal."

=== Box office ===
According to MGM records, the film earned $1,066,000 in the US and Canada and $568,000 elsewhere resulting in a profit of $475,000.
