= The Mountain (1956 film) =

1956 film by Edward Dmytryk

- Theatrical release poster
- Directed by: Edward Dmytryk
- Written by: Ranald MacDougall
- Based on: La neige en deuil by Henri Troyat
- Starring: Spencer Tracy; Robert Wagner
- Cinematography: Franz Planer
- Edited by: Frank Bracht
- Music by: Daniele Amfitheatrof
- Production company: Paramount Pictures
- Distributed by: Paramount Pictures
- Release date: November 14, 1956 (New York City)
- Running time: 105 minutes
- Country: United States
- Language: English
- Budget: $2,119,000
- Box office: $1.8 million (US/Canada rentals)

The Mountain is a 1956 American adventure drama film starring Spencer Tracy and Robert Wagner. The supporting cast included Claire Trevor, Richard Arlen, William Demarest, and Anna Kashfi. It is based on La neige en deuil, a 1952 French novel by Henri Troyat which was inspired by the crash of Air India Flight 245 in 1950.

== Plot ==
When a passenger plane crashes near the top of Mont Blanc in the French Alps, greedy Christopher Teller decides to go and rob the dead. However, he has no hope of getting to the crash site without the help of his older brother Zachary, a highly skilled mountain climber. Zachary wants to leave the dead in peace, but Chris hounds him until he finally gives in.

When they reach the downed plane, they find one badly injured survivor, an Indian woman. Chris wants to leave her there to die, but Zachary insists on bringing her down the mountain.

On the descent, Chris, ignoring Zachary's warning, tries to cross an unsafe snow bridge and falls to his death. When Zachary gets the woman to his village, he tells everyone that he went up the mountain to rob the plane and forced his brother to go with him, but his friends know better.

== Cast ==
- Spencer Tracy as Zachary Teller
- Robert Wagner as Christopher 'Chris' Teller
- Claire Trevor as Marie
- William Demarest as Father Belacchi
- Barbara Darrow as Simone
- Richard Arlen as C.W. Rivial
- E. G. Marshall as Solange
- Anna Kashfi as Hindu Girl
- Richard Garrick as Coloz
- Harry Townes as Joseph
- Stacy Harris as Servoz
- Yves Brainville as André

== Reception ==
The film was widely viewed as a captivating adventure spectacular, as far as the essential climb scenes, which dominate the film. Reviewers generally dismissed the surrounding drama as less impressive, and mocked the pairing of actors Tracy and Wagner as brothers, which seemed implausible because of their vastly different ages—though Tracy's performance was uniformly praised. Reviewers (including actual mountain climbers) disagreed over the degree of realism.

The New York Times lauded the climbing scenes as truly conveying the feeling of climbing the mountain, with some scenes "really terrifying to behold." The reviewer added that the director's use of color and VistaVision effectively conveyed the "magnificent... stunning scenery." Though panning "the drama... fit... around the climbing" [as] "flimsy and hard to take," the Times noted the film was "worth seeing."

Several actual mountain climbers have reviewed the film, including Benjamin Epstein, who wrote in the Los Angeles Times that it "is long on heart [but] short on realism"—a view shared by Colorado writer/climber Candace Horgan. Dismissing the film as "mostly just plain hokey," Epstein acknowledged that Spencer Tracy was "great to watch."

== See also ==
- List of American films of 1956
- Mountain film
