= Spencer Tracy =

American actor (1900–1967)

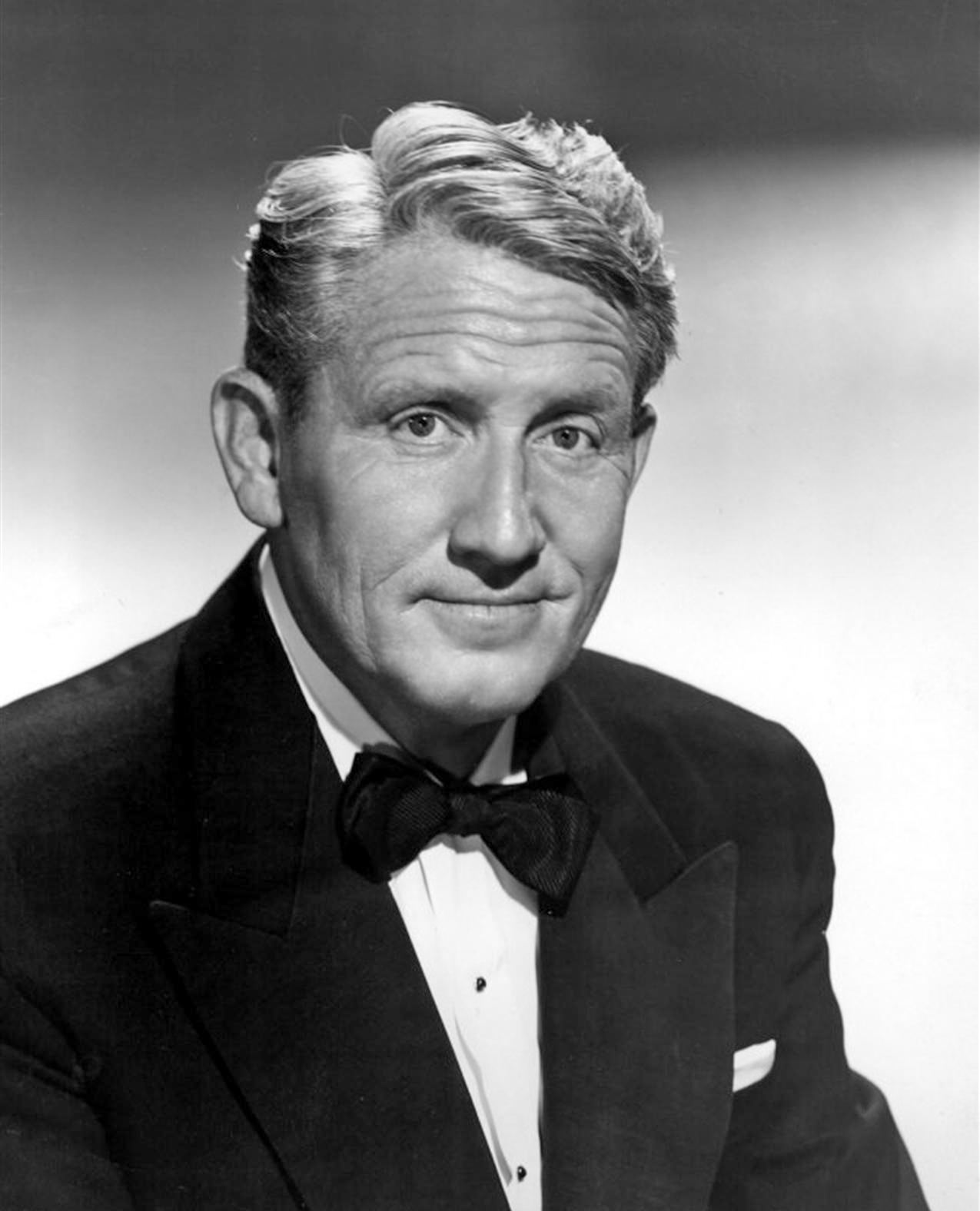
- Tracy in State of the Union (1948)
- Born: April 5, 1900; Milwaukee, Wisconsin, U.S.
- Died: June 10, 1967 (aged 67); Beverly Hills, California, U.S.
- Burial place: Forest Lawn Memorial Park, Glendale
- Education: Ripon College; American Academy of Dramatic Arts
- Occupation: Actor
- Years active: 1921–1967
- Spouse: Louise Treadwell (m. 1923; sep. 1933)
- Partner: Katharine Hepburn (1941–1967)
- Children: 2

Spencer Bonaventure Tracy (April 5, 1900 – June 10, 1967) was an American actor. He was known for his natural performing style and versatility. One of the major stars of Hollywood's Golden Age, Tracy was the first actor to win two consecutive Academy Awards for Best Actor, from nine nominations. During his career, he appeared in 75 films and developed a reputation among his peers as one of the screen's greatest actors. In 1999, the American Film Institute ranked Tracy as the ninth greatest male star of Classic Hollywood Cinema.

Tracy first discovered his talent for acting while attending Ripon College, and he later received a scholarship for the American Academy of Dramatic Arts. He spent seven years in the theater, working in a succession of stock companies and intermittently on Broadway. His breakthrough came in 1930, when his lead performance in The Last Mile caught the attention of Hollywood. After a successful film debut in John Ford's Up the River (in which he starred with Humphrey Bogart), he was signed to a contract with Fox Film Corporation. Tracy's five years with Fox featured one acting tour de force after another that were usually ignored at the box office, and he remained largely unknown to movie audiences after 25 films, nearly all of them starring him as the leading man. None of them were hits, although his performance in The Power and the Glory (1933) was highly praised at the time.

In 1935, Tracy joined Metro-Goldwyn-Mayer (MGM), Hollywood's most prestigious studio at the time. His career flourished after his fifth MGM film, Fury (1936), and in 1937 and 1938 he won consecutive Oscars for Captains Courageous and Boys Town. Tracy teamed with Clark Gable, MGM's most prominent leading man, for three major box office successes, and by the early 1940s, he was one of MGM's top stars. In 1942, he appeared with Katharine Hepburn in Woman of the Year, beginning a professional and personal partnership that led to nine films over 25 years. In 1955, Tracy won the Cannes Film Festival Award for Best Actor for his performance in the film Bad Day at Black Rock.

Tracy left MGM in 1955 and continued to work regularly as a freelance star, despite several health issues and an increasing weariness and irritability as he aged. His personal life was troubled, with a lifelong struggle against severe alcoholism and guilt over his son's deafness. Tracy and his wife Louise became estranged in the 1930s, but the couple never divorced. His 25-year relationship with Katharine Hepburn was an open secret. Towards the end of his life, Tracy worked almost exclusively for director Stanley Kramer. Tracy made his last film with Kramer, Guess Who's Coming to Dinner (1967), with filming completed just 17 days before he died.

== Early life and education ==
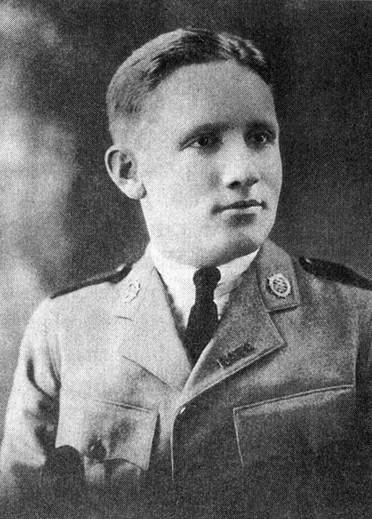
Tracy at the Northwestern Military and Naval Academy in 1919

Spencer Bonaventure Tracy was born in Milwaukee on April 5, 1900, the second son of Caroline (née Brown; 1874–1942) and truck salesman John Edward Tracy (1873–1928). His mother was from a wealthy Presbyterian Midwestern family, while his father was of Irish Catholic descent. He had a brother Carroll, who was four years older.

Tracy was a difficult and hyperactive child with poor school attendance. Raised Catholic, he was placed in the care of Dominican Order nuns at the age of nine in an attempt to transform his behavior. Later in life, he remarked that he "never would have gone back to school if there had been any other way of learning to read the subtitles in the movies". He became fascinated with movies, watching the same ones repeatedly and later re-enacting scenes to his friends and neighbors. He attended several Jesuit academies in his teenage years, which he claimed took the "badness" out of him and helped him improve his grades.

It helped me develop memory for lines that has been a godsend since I started stage work; it gave me something of a stage presence; and it helped get rid of my awkwardness. Also, I gradually developed the ability to speak extemporaneously.

— Tracy was a key member of his college debating team, which he later said helped with his acting career.

At Marquette Academy, he began attending plays with lifelong friend and fellow actor Pat O'Brien, awakening his interest in the theater. With little care for their studies and "itching for a chance to go and see some excitement", Tracy and O'Brien enlisted in the Navy together during World War I when Tracy turned 18. They were sent to the Naval Training Station near Chicago, where they were still recruits-in-training when the war came to an end. Tracy achieved the rank of seaman second class, but never went to sea and was discharged in February 1919. His father's desire to see one of his sons gain a college degree drove Tracy back to high school to finish his diploma. Studies at two more institutions, plus the additional allowance of "war credits", won Tracy a place at Ripon College. He entered in February 1921, declaring his intention to major in medicine.

Tracy was a popular student at Ripon, where he served as president of his hall and was involved in a number of college activities. He made his stage debut in June 1921, playing the male lead in The Truth. He was very well received in the role and quickly developed a passion for the stage; he was reportedly "obsessive about acting to the degree that he talked about little else". He and some friends formed an acting company called the Campus Players, which they took on tour. As a member of the college debate team, Tracy excelled in arguing and public speaking. It was during a tour with the debate team that he auditioned for the American Academy of Dramatic Arts (AADA) in New York City. He was offered a scholarship to attend the school after performing a scene from one of his earlier roles.

Tracy left Ripon and began classes at AADA in April 1922. O'Brien was also enrolled there and the two shared a small studio apartment. Money was scarce, and the two often lived on meals of rice and pretzels and shared one decent suit between them. Tracy was deemed fit to progress to the senior class, allowing him to join the academy's stock company. He made his New York debut in a play called The Wedding Guests, which opened in October 1922. He made his debut Broadway appearance three months later, playing a wordless robot in R.U.R. He graduated from AADA in March 1923.

== Career ==
=== Stock theater and Broadway (1923–1930) ===
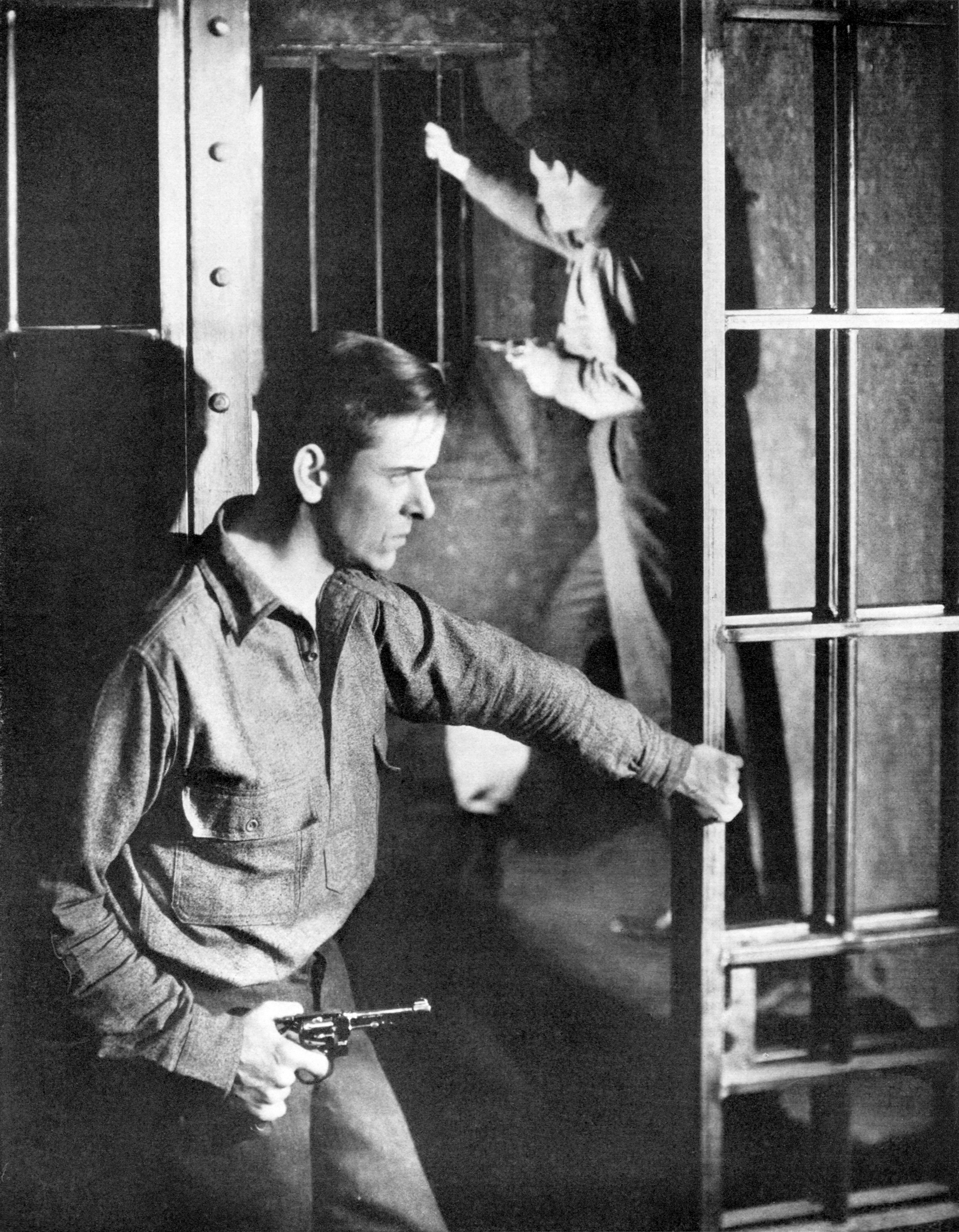
Tracy (background) in The Last Mile – the 1930 Broadway role that saw him scouted for Hollywood

Immediately following graduation, Tracy joined a new stock company based in White Plains, New York, where he was given peripheral roles. Unhappy there, he moved to a company in Cincinnati, but failed to make an impact. In November 1923, he landed a small part on Broadway in the comedy A Royal Fandango, starring Ethel Barrymore. Reviews for the show were poor and it closed after 25 performances; Tracy later said of the failure, "My ego took an awful beating." When he took a position with a struggling company in New Jersey, Tracy was living on an allowance of 35 cents a day. In January 1924, he played his first leading role with a company in Winnipeg, but the organization soon closed.

Tracy finally achieved some success by joining forces with the notable stock manager William H. Wright in the spring of 1924. A stage partnership was formed with the young actress Selena Royle, who had already made her name on Broadway. It proved a popular draw and their productions were favorably received. One of these performances brought Tracy to the attention of a Broadway producer, who offered him the lead in a new play. The Sheepman previewed in October 1925, but it received poor reviews and closed after its trial run in Connecticut. Dejected, Tracy was forced back to Wright and the stock circuit.

In the fall of 1926, Tracy was offered his third shot at Broadway: a role in a new George M. Cohan play called Yellow. Tracy swore that if the play failed to be a hit he would leave stock and work in a "regular" business instead. Tracy was nervous about working with Cohan, one of the most important figures in American theater, but during rehearsals Cohan announced, "Tracy, you're the best goddamned actor I've ever seen!" Yellow opened on September 21; reviews were mixed but it ran for 135 performances. It was the beginning of an important collaboration for Tracy: "I'd have quit the stage completely," he later commented, "if it hadn't been for George M. Cohan." Cohan wrote a part specifically for Tracy in his next play, The Baby Cyclone. It opened on Broadway in September 1927 and was a hit.

Tracy followed this success with another Cohan play, Whispering Friends, and in 1929 took over from Clark Gable in Conflict, a Broadway drama. Other roles followed, but it was the lead in Dread, written by Pulitzer Prize-winning dramatist Owen Davis that gave Tracy high hopes for success. The story of a man's descent into madness, Dread previewed in Brooklyn to an excellent reception, but on the next day—October 29—the New York stock market crashed. Unable to obtain funding, Dread did not open on Broadway. Following this disappointment, Tracy again considered leaving the theater and returning to Milwaukee for a more stable life.

In January 1930, Tracy was approached about a new play called The Last Mile. Looking to cast the lead role of a murderer on death row, producer Herman Shumlin met with Tracy, and later recounted: "beneath the surface, here was a man of passion, violence, sensitivity and desperation: no ordinary man, and just the man for the part." The Last Mile opened on Broadway in February, where Tracy's performance was met by a standing ovation that lasted 14 curtain calls. The Commonweal described him as "one of our best and most versatile young actors". The play was a hit with critics, and ran for 289 performances.

=== Fox (1930–1935) ===
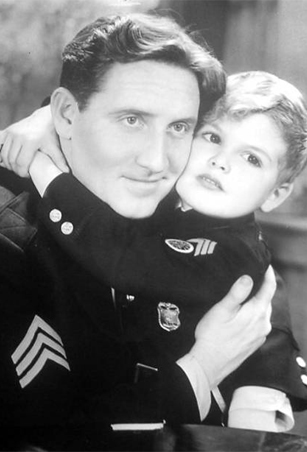
With Dickie Moore in Disorderly Conduct (1932), Tracy's seventh film

In 1930, Broadway was being scouted to find actors to work in the new medium of sound films. Tracy was cast in two Vitaphone shorts (Taxi Talks and The Hard Guy), but he had not considered becoming a film actor: "I had no ambition in that direction and I was perfectly happy on the stage", he later explained in an interview. One person who saw Tracy in The Last Mile was director John Ford.

Ford wanted Tracy for the lead role in his next picture, a prison movie. Production company Fox Film Corporation was unsure about Tracy, saying that he did not photograph well, but Ford convinced them that he was right for the role. Up the River (1930) marked the film debut of both Tracy and Humphrey Bogart. After seeing the rushes, Fox immediately offered Tracy a long-term contract. Knowing that he needed the money for his family, with his young son deaf and recovering from polio, Tracy signed with Fox and moved to California. He appeared on the stage only once more in his life.

Winfield Sheehan, the head of Fox, committed to making Tracy a bankable commodity. The studio promoted the actor, releasing ads for his second film Quick Millions (1931) with the headline "A New Star Shines". Three films were made in quick succession, all of which were unsuccessful at the box office. Tracy found himself typecast in comedies, usually playing a crook or a con man. The mold was broken with his seventh picture, Disorderly Conduct (1932), and it was the first of his films since Up the River to return a profit.

In mid-1932, after nine pictures, Tracy remained virtually unknown to the public. He considered leaving Fox once his contract was up for renewal, but a raise in his weekly salary to $1,500 convinced him to stay. He continued to appear in unpopular films, with Me and My Gal (1932) setting an all-time low attendance record for the Roxy Theatre in New York City. He was loaned to Warner Bros. for 20,000 Years in Sing Sing (1932), a prison drama co-starring Bette Davis. Tracy was hopeful that it would be his break-out role, but despite good reviews, this failed to materialize.

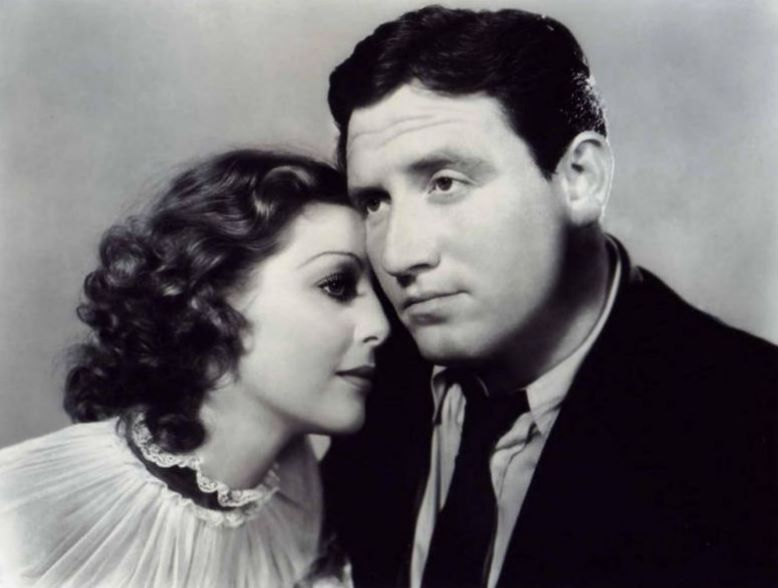
Tracy appeared with Loretta Young in Man's Castle (1933).

Critics began to notice Tracy with The Power and the Glory (1933). The story of a man's rise to prosperity had a screenplay by Preston Sturges and Tracy's performance as railroad tycoon Tom Garner received uniformly strong reviews. William Wilkerson of The Hollywood Reporter wrote: "This sterling performer has finally been given an opportunity to show an ability that has been boxed in by gangster roles ... [the film] has introduced Mr. Tracy as one of the screen's best performers". Mordaunt Hall of The New York Times stated: "No more convincing performance has been given on the screen than Spencer Tracy's impersonation of Tom Garner." Shanghai Madness (1933), meanwhile, revealed Tracy to have a previously unseen sex appeal and served to advance his standing. Despite this attention, Tracy's next two movies went largely unnoticed. Man's Castle (1933) with Loretta Young was anticipated to be a hit, but made only a small profit. The Show-Off (1934), for which he was lent to Metro-Goldwyn-Mayer, proved popular, but his subsequent outings continued to be unsuccessful.

Tracy drank heavily during his years with Fox and gained a reputation as an alcoholic. He failed to report for filming on Marie Galante in June 1934, and was found in his hotel room, virtually unconscious after a two-week binge. Tracy was removed from the Fox payroll while he recovered in a hospital, and then sued for $125,000 for delaying the production. He completed only two more pictures with the studio.

The details on how Tracy's relationship with Fox ended are unclear: later in life Tracy maintained that he was fired for his drunken behavior, but the Fox records do not support such an account. He was still under contract with the studio when MGM expressed their interest in the actor. They were in need of a new male star, and contacted Tracy on April 2, 1935, offering him a seven-year deal. That afternoon, the contract between Tracy and Fox was terminated "by mutual consent". Tracy made a total of 25 pictures in the five years he was with Fox Film Corporation, most of which lost money at the box office.

=== Metro-Goldwyn-Mayer (1935–1955) ===
==== Growing reputation ====
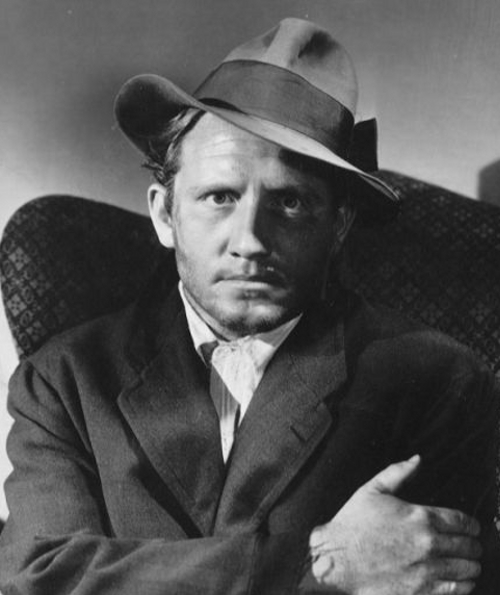
Tracy in Fritz Lang's Fury (1936), his first major hit

In the 1930s, MGM was the most respected movie production studio in Hollywood. When Tracy arrived there, he was all but unknown. Biographer James Curtis writes: "Tracy was scarcely a blip on the box office barometer in 1935, a critics' darling and little more". He was, however, well known for being a troublemaker. Producer Irving Thalberg was nevertheless enthusiastic about working with the actor, telling journalist Louella Parsons: "Spencer Tracy will become one of MGM's most valuable stars."

Curtis notes that the studio managed Tracy with care, a welcome change from the ineptitude and apathy he had known while at Fox, which was like "a shot of adrenaline" for the actor. His first film under the new contract was the quickly produced The Murder Man (1935), which included the feature film debut of James Stewart. Thalberg then began a strategy of pairing Tracy with the studio's top actresses: Whipsaw (1935) co-starred Myrna Loy and was a commercial success. Riffraff (1936) put Tracy opposite Jean Harlow. Both films were, however, designed and promoted to showcase their leading ladies, thus continuing Tracy's reputation as a secondary star.

Fury (1936) was the first film to prove that Tracy could make a success on his own merit. Directed by Fritz Lang, Tracy played an innocent man who swears revenge after narrowly escaping death by a lynch mob. The film and performance received excellent reviews. It made a profit of $1.3 million worldwide. Curtis writes: "audiences who, just a year earlier, had no clear handle on him, were suddenly turning out to see him. It was a transition that was nothing short of miraculous ... [and showed] a willingness on the part of the public to embrace a leading man who was not textbook handsome nor bigger than life."

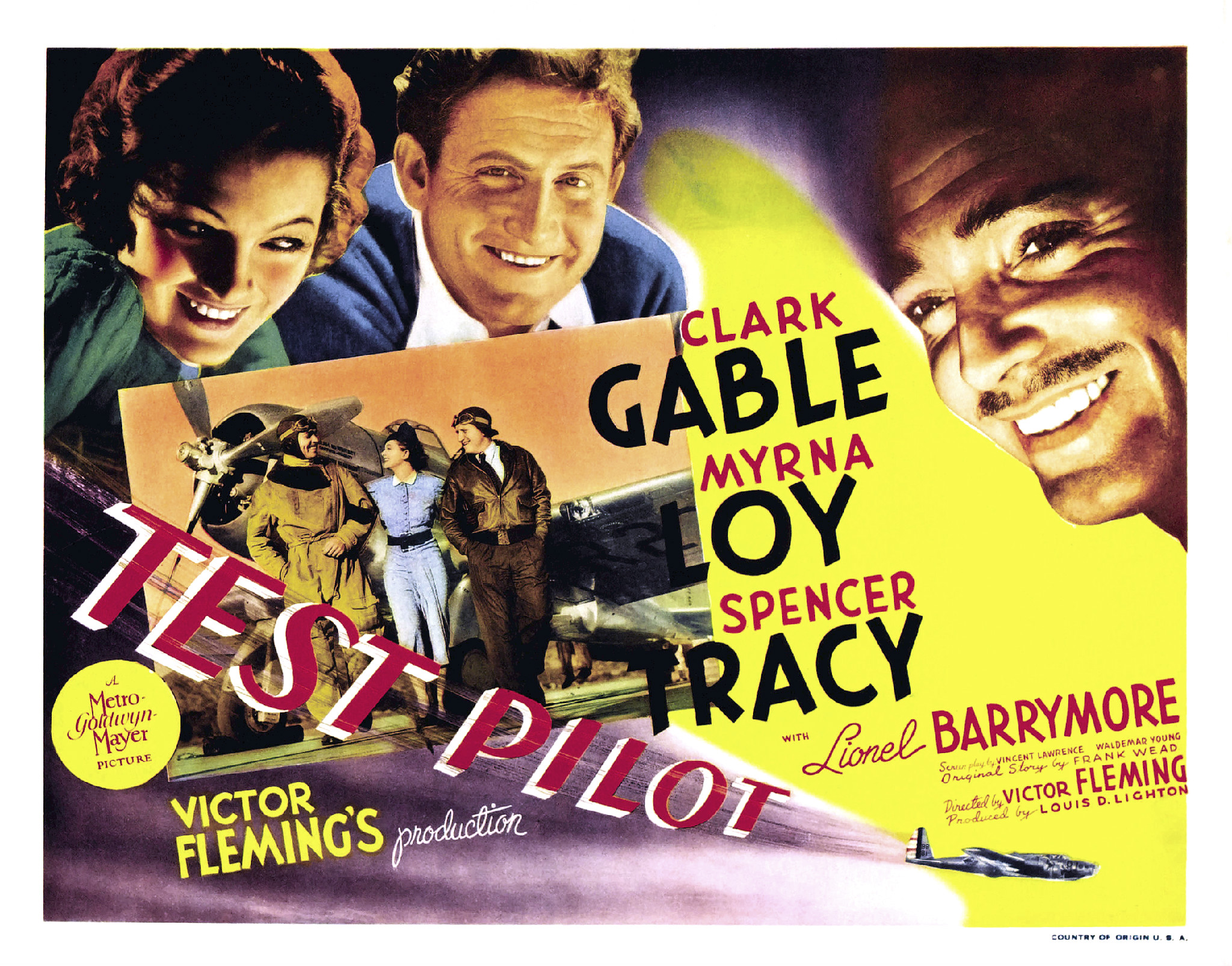
Lobby card with Clark Gable and Myrna Loy in Test Pilot (1938), one of the three enormously successful films that fixed Gable and Tracy as a team in the public imagination

Fury was followed one month later with the release of the big-budget disaster movie San Francisco (1936). Tracy played a supporting role alongside Clark Gable in the film, allowing audiences to see him with the top male star in Hollywood. Taking on the role of a priest, Tracy reportedly felt a heavy responsibility in representing the church. Tracy was highly praised for his performance and received his first Academy Award nomination despite having only 17 minutes of screen time. San Francisco became the highest-grossing film of 1936. Donald Deschner, in his book on Tracy, credits Fury and San Francisco as the "two films that changed his career and gave him the status of a major star".

By this point, Tracy entered a period of self-imposed sobriety and MGM expressed pleasure with Tracy's professionalism. His public reputation continued to grow with Libeled Lady (also 1936), a screwball comedy that cast him with William Powell, Loy and Harlow. According to Curtis, "Powell, Harlow and Loy were among the biggest draws in the industry, and equal billing in such a powerhouse company could only serve to advance Tracy's standing". Libeled Lady was his third hit picture in the space of six months.

==== Oscar wins ====
Tracy appeared in four films released in 1937. They Gave Him a Gun, a crime-drama, went largely unnoticed, but Captains Courageous was one of the major film events of the year. Tracy played a Portuguese fisherman in the adventure movie, based on the novel by Rudyard Kipling. He was uncomfortable feigning a foreign accent, and resented having his hair curled, but the role was a hit with audiences and Tracy won the Academy Award for Best Actor. Captains Courageous was followed by Big City with Luise Rainer and Mannequin with Joan Crawford, the latter of which performed well at the box office. With two years of hit movies and industry recognition, Tracy became a star in the United States. A 1937 poll of 20 million people to find the "King and Queen of Hollywood" ranked Tracy sixth among males.

Tracy was reunited with Clark Gable and Myrna Loy for Test Pilot (1938). The film was another enormous commercial and critical success, permanently cementing the notion of Gable and Tracy as a team in the public imagination.

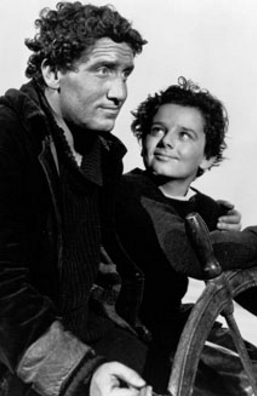
Tracy and Freddie Bartholomew in Captains Courageous (1937)

Based on the positive response he had received in San Francisco, MGM again cast Tracy as a priest in Boys Town (also 1938). Portraying Edward J. Flanagan, a Catholic priest and founder of Boys Town in Nebraska, was a role Tracy took seriously: "I'm so anxious to do a good job as Father Flanagan that it worries me, keeps me awake at night." Tracy received strong reviews for his performance, and the movie grossed $4 million worldwide. Tracy won the Academy Award for Best Actor, becoming the first actor to win two consecutive Oscars in the Best Actor category. He was humble about the recognition, saying in his acceptance speech: "I honestly do not feel that I can accept this award ... I can accept it only as it was meant to be for a great man—Father Flanagan". Although he did keep his Oscar statuette, a second statuette was struck and immediately sent to Flanagan. Tracy was listed as the fifth biggest box office star of 1938.

Tracy was absent from screens for almost a year before returning to Fox on loan and appearing as Henry M. Stanley in Stanley and Livingstone (1939) with Nancy Kelly. Curtis maintains that Tracy's non-visibility did little to affect his standing with the public or exhibitors. In October 1939, a Fortune magazine survey of the nation's favorite movie actors listed Tracy in first place.

==== Established star ====
MGM capitalized on Tracy's popularity, casting him in four movies for 1940. I Take This Woman with Hedy Lamarr was a critical and commercial failure, but the historical drama Northwest Passage—Tracy's first film in Technicolor—proved popular. He then portrayed Thomas Edison in Edison, the Man. Howard Barnes of the New York Herald Tribune was not charmed by the story, but wrote that Tracy, "by sheer persuasion of his acting", made the film worthy. Boom Town was the third and final Gable-Tracy picture, also starring Claudette Colbert and Hedy Lamarr, making it one of the most anticipated films of the year. The film opened to the biggest crowd since Gone With the Wind.

Tracy signed a new contract with MGM in April 1941, which paid $5,000 a week and limited him to three pictures a year (Tracy had previously expressed a need to reduce his workload). The contract also stated for the first time that his billing was to be "that of a star". Contrary to popular belief, the contract did not include a clause that he receive top billing, but from this point onward, every film Tracy appeared in featured his name first, with the exception of his "guest appearance" in Thirty Seconds Over Tokyo (1944).

Tracy returned to his Oscar-winning role of Father Flanagan for the sequel Men of Boys Town (1941). It was followed by Tracy's only venture into the horror genre; an adaptation of Dr. Jekyll and Mr. Hyde (also 1941), co-starring Ingrid Bergman and Lana Turner. Tracy was unhappy with the film and disliked the heavy makeup he needed to portray Hyde. Critical response to the film was mixed and brought Tracy the only negative reviews of his career. Theodore Strauss of The New York Times wrote that "Mr. Tracy's portrait of Hyde is not so much evil incarnate as it is the ham rampant." The film was financially successful, however, taking in more than $2 million at the box office.

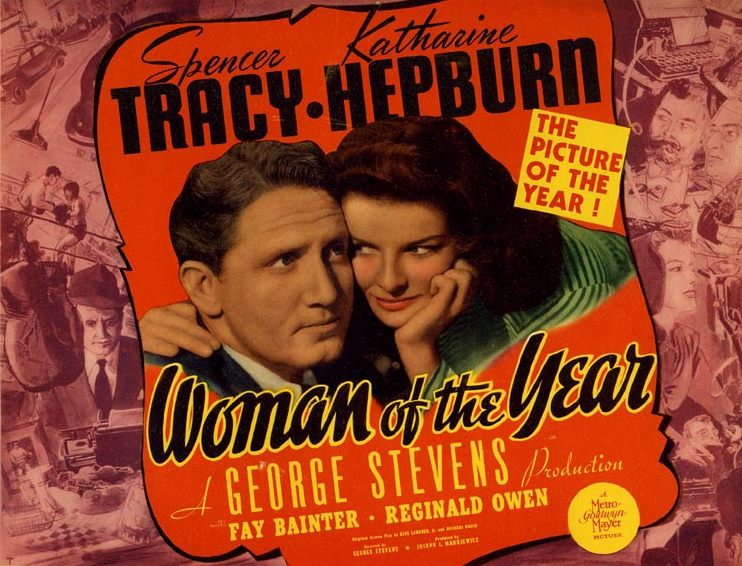
Lobby card for Woman of the Year (1942), the first of nine pictures Tracy made with Katharine Hepburn

Tracy was set to star in a film version of The Yearling for 1942, but several on-set difficulties and bad weather on location forced MGM to shelve the production. With the end of that project, he became available for the new Katharine Hepburn film, Woman of the Year (1942). Hepburn greatly admired Tracy, calling him "the best movie actor there was". She had wanted him for her comeback vehicle, The Philadelphia Story (1940). Hepburn was delighted that Tracy was available for Woman of the Year, saying "I was just damned grateful he was willing to work with me." The romantic comedy performed well at the box office and received strong reviews. William Boehnel wrote in the New York World-Telegram, "To begin with, it has Katharine Hepburn and Spencer Tracy in the leading roles. This in itself would be enough to make any film memorable. But when you get Tracy and Hepburn turning in brilliant performances to boot, you've got something to cheer about."

Woman of the Year was followed by an adaptation of John Steinbeck's Tortilla Flat (also 1942) which met with a tepid response. MGM did not hesitate to repeat the teaming of Tracy and Hepburn and cast them in the dark mystery Keeper of the Flame (1943). Despite a weak critical reception the film out-grossed Woman of the Year confirming the strength of their partnership.

Tracy's next three appearances were all war-based. A Guy Named Joe (1943) with Irene Dunne surpassed San Francisco to become his highest-grossing film to date. The Seventh Cross (1944), a suspense film about an escape from a Nazi concentration camp, met with critical acclaim. It was followed by the aviation film Thirty Seconds Over Tokyo (1944). On the strength of these three releases, the annual Quigley poll revealed Tracy was MGM's biggest money-making star of 1944, His only film the following year was his third with Hepburn, Without Love (1945), a light romantic comedy that performed well at the box office despite muted enthusiasm from critics.

==== Stage and screen ====
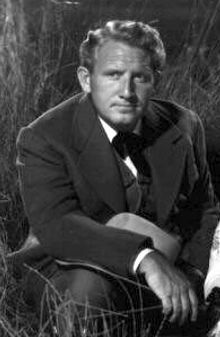
The Sea of Grass (1947)

In 1945, Tracy returned to the stage for the first time in 15 years. He had been through a dark patch personally—culminating with a hospital stay—and Hepburn felt that a play would help restore his focus. Tracy told a journalist in April, "I'm coming back to Broadway to see if I can still act." The play was The Rugged Path by Robert E. Sherwood. It first previewed in Providence, Rhode Island on September 28th to a sold-out crowd and tepid response. It was a difficult production; director Garson Kanin later wrote: "In the ten days prior to the New York opening all the important relationships had deteriorated. Spencer was tense and unbending, could not, or would not, take direction". Tracy considered leaving the show before it even opened on Broadway, and lasted there just six weeks before announcing his intention to close the show. It closed on January 19, 1946 after 81 performances. Tracy later explained to a friend: "I couldn't say those goddamn lines over and over and over again every night ... At least every day is a new day for me in films ... But this thing—every day, every day, over and over again."

Tracy was absent from screens in 1946, the first year since his motion picture debut that there was no Spencer Tracy release. His next film was The Sea of Grass (1947), a melodrama set in the American Old West with Hepburn. Similar to Keeper of the Flame and Without Love, a lukewarm response from critics did not stop it from being a financial success both at home and abroad. He followed it later that year with Cass Timberlane, in which he played a judge. It was a commercial success, but Curtis notes that co-star Lana Turner overshadowed Tracy in most of the reviews.

A fifth film with Hepburn, Frank Capra's political drama State of the Union, was released in 1948. Tracy played a presidential candidate in the movie, which was warmly received. He then appeared in Edward, My Son (1949) with Deborah Kerr. Tracy disliked the role, and told director George Cukor, "It's rather disconcerting to me to find how easily I play a heel." Upon its release, The New Yorker wrote of the "hopeless miscasting of Mr. Tracy". The film became Tracy's biggest money-loser at MGM.

Tracy finished off the 1940s with Malaya (1949), an adventure film with James Stewart, and Adam's Rib (also 1949), a comedy with Tracy and Hepburn playing married lawyers who oppose each other in court. Tracy and Hepburn's friends, Garson Kanin and Ruth Gordon, wrote the parts specifically for the two leads. The film received strong reviews and became the highest-grossing Tracy-Hepburn picture to date. Film critic Bosley Crowther wrote, "Mr. Tracy and Miss Hepburn are the stellar performers in this show and their perfect compatibility in comic capers is delightful to see."

==== Final MGM years ====
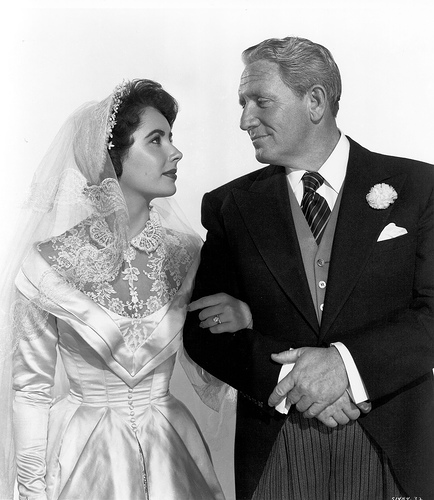
Tracy and Elizabeth Taylor in a promotional image for Father of the Bride (1950). The comedic role of Stanley Banks was one of Tracy's nine Oscar-nominated performances.

Tracy received his first Academy Award nomination in 12 years for playing the role of Stanley Banks in Father of the Bride (1950), a comedy in which he plays a father struggling to manage the preparations for the wedding of his daughter (Elizabeth Taylor). "It's the second strong comedy in a row for Spencer Tracy, doing the title role, and he socks it", Variety commented. The film was the biggest commercial success of Tracy's career to date, earning $6 million worldwide. MGM wanted a sequel, and while Tracy was unsure, he accepted. Father's Little Dividend was released ten months later, in April 1951, and performed well at the box office. On the strength of the two movies, Tracy polled as one of the nation's top stars once more.

Tracy portrayed a lawyer in The People Against O'Hara (1951) and re-teamed with Hepburn for the sports comedy Pat and Mike (1952), the second feature written expressly for them by Kanin and Gordon. Pat and Mike became one of the duo's most popular and critically acclaimed films. Tracy followed it with Plymouth Adventure (also 1952), a historical drama set aboard the Mayflower, co-starring Gene Tierney. It met with poor critical and box office response and posted a loss of $1.8 million for MGM. Tracy returned to the role of a concerned father in The Actress (1953). Producer Lawrence Weingarten recalled: "That film ... got more [acclaim] from the critics than any film I ever made in all the years, and we didn't make enough to pay for the ushers in the theatre." For his performance in The Actress, Tracy won the Golden Globe Award for Best Actor in a Motion Picture – Drama and was nominated for the BAFTA Award for Best Actor in a Leading Role.

MGM lent Tracy to Fox for the well-received Western film Broken Lance, his only film released in 1954. In 1955, Tracy turned down William Wyler's The Desperate Hours because he refused to take second-billing to Humphrey Bogart. Instead, Tracy appeared as a one-armed protagonist who faces the hostility of a small desert town in Bad Day at Black Rock (1955), a film directed by John Sturges. For his work, Tracy received a fifth Academy Award nomination and won Best Actor at the Cannes Film Festival.

Tracy had personally been unhappy with the picture and threatened to leave during production. This behavior became a regular occurrence for Tracy, who was increasingly lethargic and cynical. He began production on Tribute to a Bad Man in the summer of 1955, but pulled out when he claimed that the shooting location in the Colorado mountains gave him altitude sickness. The problems caused by the picture fractured Tracy's relationship with MGM. In June 1955, he was one of the two remaining stars of the studio's peak years (the other being Robert Taylor), but with his contract up for renewal, Tracy opted to freelance for the first time in his movie career.

=== Independent player (1956–1967) ===
Tracy's first post-MGM appearance was in The Mountain (1956), released by Paramount Pictures. The film co-starred Robert Wagner, who played his much younger brother (Wagner had earlier played his son in Broken Lance). The location filming in the French Alps proved a difficult experience, and he threatened to leave the project. He received his second BAFTA nomination for his performance. Tracy and Hepburn then paired together for the eighth time in the office-based comedy Desk Set (1957), released by Twentieth Century-Fox. Again, he had to be convinced to stay with the film, one which met with a weak response.

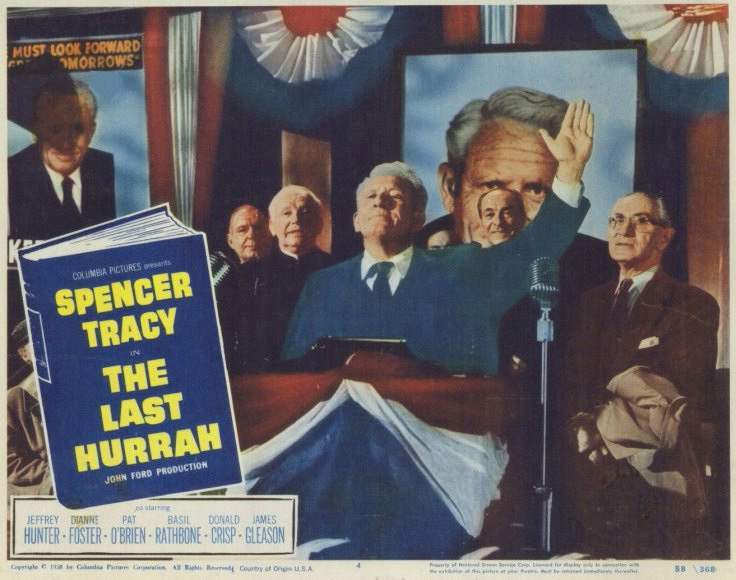
Lobby card for John Ford's The Last Hurrah (1958)

Tracy appeared in The Old Man and the Sea (1958), a project that had been in development for five years. An adaptation of Ernest Hemingway's novella of the same title, Hemingway's agent, Leland Hayward, had previously written to the author: "Of all Hollywood people, the one that comes the closest to me in quality, in personality and voice, in personal dignity and ability, is Spencer Tracy." Tracy was delighted to be offered the role. He was told to lose some of his 210 pounds before filming began but failed to do so. Hemingway thus reported that Tracy was a "terrible liability to the picture", and had to be reassured that the star was being carefully photographed to disguise his weight problem. Appearing alone on screen for most of the film, Tracy considered The Old Man and the Sea the toughest part he ever played. In reviewing the performance, Jack Moffitt of The Hollywood Reporter said it was "so intimate and revealing of universal human experience that, to me, it almost transcended acting and became reality". Tracy received Academy Award and Golden Globe nominations for his work.

After abandoning two projects, including a proposed remake of The Blue Angel with Marilyn Monroe, Tracy's next feature was The Last Hurrah (1958). It reunited him with his debut director, John Ford, after 28 years and his childhood friend Pat O'Brien. Tracy took a year to commit to the project, in which he played an Irish-American mayor seeking re-election. The movie was favorably reviewed, but not commercially successful. At the end of 1958, the National Board of Review named Tracy the year's Best Actor. He nevertheless began to ponder retirement, with Curtis writing that he was "chronically tired, unhappy, ill, and uninterested in work".

==== Stanley Kramer partnership ====
Inherit the Wind (1960), the first of four films Tracy made with Stanley Kramer, depicted the Scopes "Monkey Trial" of 1925.

Tracy did not appear on the screen again until the release of Inherit the Wind (1960), a film based on the 1925 Scopes "Monkey Trial" which debated the right to teach evolution in schools. Director Stanley Kramer sought Tracy for the role of lawyer Henry Drummond (based on Clarence Darrow), from the outset. Starring opposite Tracy was Fredric March, a pairing Variety described as "a stroke of casting genius ... Both men are spellbinders in the most laudatory sense of the word." The film garnered Tracy some of the strongest reviews of his career and he was nominated for an Academy Award, BAFTA Award and Golden Globe Award for the performance, although it was not a commercial hit.

In the volcano disaster movie The Devil at 4 O'Clock (1961), Tracy played a priest for the fourth time in his career. His co-star, Frank Sinatra, ceded top-billing to guarantee Tracy for the picture. Continuing his pattern of indecisiveness, Tracy briefly pulled out of the production before recommitting. Critics were unenthusiastic about the film, which was nevertheless Tracy's most successful box-office outing since Father of the Bride.

Inherit the Wind began an enduring collaboration between Stanley Kramer and Tracy—Kramer directed Tracy's three final films. Judgment at Nuremberg, released in December 1961, was their second feature together. The film depicts the Judges' Trial, the trial of Nazi judges for their role in the Holocaust. Abby Mann wrote the role of Judge Haywood with Tracy in mind; Tracy called it the best script he had ever read. At the end of the film, Tracy delivered a 13-minute monologue. He recorded it in one take and received a round of applause from the cast and crew. Upon seeing the film, Mann wrote to Tracy: "Every writer ought to have the experience of having Spencer Tracy do his lines. There is nothing in the world quite like it." The film met with positive reviews and a large audience; Tracy received an eighth Academy Award nomination for his performance.

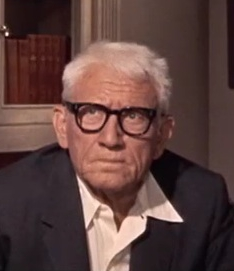
In Guess Who's Coming to Dinner (1967). Tracy died 17 days after filming was completed.

Tracy turned down roles in Long Day's Journey into Night (1962) and The Leopard (1963), and had to pull out of MGM's all-star How the West Was Won (1962) when it clashed with Judgment at Nuremberg. He was, however, able to record the film's narration track. Tracy was in very poor health by this time, and working became a challenge. In 1962, he took the role of Captain T. G. Culpeper in Kramer's comedy It's a Mad, Mad, Mad, Mad World (1963), a small but key part that he was able to complete in nine non-consecutive days, but which he himself considered one of the lowest points in his acting career. The film was released in November 1963. Tracy's name topped the list of performers, and the comedy became the third highest-grossing film of the year. As his health worsened, he had to cancel commitments to Cheyenne Autumn (1964) and The Cincinnati Kid (1965). Film offers continued to come, but Tracy did not work again until 1967 when he took the starring role in Kramer's Guess Who's Coming to Dinner (1967), Tracy's ninth and final film with Hepburn.

Guess Who's Coming to Dinner explored the topic of interracial marriage, with Tracy playing a liberal-minded newspaper publisher whose values are challenged when his daughter wishes to marry a black man, played by Sidney Poitier. Tracy appeared happy to be working again, but he told journalists visiting the set that the movie would be his last for he would permanently retire after filming due to his health problems.

To commence filming, Tracy had to be insured for the high premium of $71,000 if he died during filming; Hepburn and Kramer both put their salaries in escrow until Tracy completed his scenes. In poor health, Tracy could work for only two or three hours each day. He completed his last scene on May 24, 1967. Tracy died 17 days later from a heart attack on June 10.

The film was released in December 1967, and although reviews were mixed, Curtis notes that "Tracy's performance was singled out for praise in nearly every instance." Brendan Gill of The New Yorker wrote that Tracy gave "a faultless and, under the circumstances, heartbreaking performance". The movie became Tracy's highest grossing picture. He received a posthumous Academy Award nomination—his ninth—along with a Golden Globe nomination and won the BAFTA Award for Best Actor in a Leading Role.

== Personal life ==
=== Marriage and family ===
Tracy met actress Louise Treadwell while they were both members of the Wood Players in White Plains, New York—the first stock company Tracy joined after graduating. The couple was engaged in May 1923, and married on September 10 of that year between the matinee and evening performances of his show.

Their son, John Ten Broeck Tracy, was born in June 1924. When John was 10 months old, Louise discovered that the boy was deaf. She resisted telling Tracy for three months. Tracy was devastated by the news and felt lifelong guilt over his son's deafness. He was convinced that John's hearing impairment was a punishment for his own sins. As a result, Tracy had trouble connecting with his son and distanced himself from his family. Joseph L. Mankiewicz, a friend of Tracy's, later theorized: "[Tracy] didn't leave Louise. He left the scene of his guilt." A second child, Louise "Susie" Treadwell Tracy, was born in July 1932. The children were raised in their mother's Episcopal faith.

Tracy left the family home in 1933, and he and Louise openly discussed the separation with the media, maintaining that they were still friends and had not taken divorce action. From September 1933 to June 1934, Tracy had a public affair with Loretta Young, his co-star in Man's Castle. He reconciled with Louise in 1935. There was never again an official separation between Tracy and his wife, but the marriage continued to be troubled. Tracy increasingly lived in hotels and by the 1940s, the two were effectively living separate lives. Tracy frequently engaged in extramarital affairs, including with co-stars Joan Crawford in 1937 and Ingrid Bergman in 1941. He had an affair with Myrna Loy in 1935 and 1936. In 1990, during a phone interview with educator Alan Greenberg, Loy revealed she was in love with Tracy. "I loved Spence, he was adorable...I loved him and I really did love him. I loved him. I mean I was in love with him and she [Katharine Hepburn] got in the way." Later, during the 1940s, Loy regularly visited Tracy at Beverly Hills in his hotel room.

=== Katharine Hepburn ===
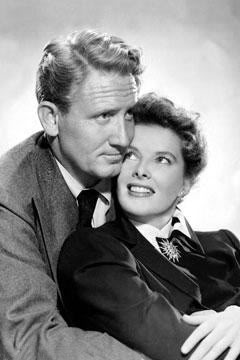
Tracy's relationship with his frequent co-star Katharine Hepburn lasted from 1941 until his death. He never divorced his wife, Louise Tracy. Promotional image for Without Love (1945).

While making Woman of the Year in September 1941, Tracy began what was to become a lifelong relationship with Katharine Hepburn. The actress became devoted to him, and their relationship lasted until his death 26 years later. Tracy never returned to live in the family home, although he visited regularly.

The MGM moguls were careful to protect their stars from controversy, and Tracy wished to conceal his relationship with Hepburn from his wife, so it was hidden from the public. The couple did not live together until the final years of Tracy's life, when they shared a cottage on George Cukor's estate in Beverly Hills. In Hollywood, however, the intimate nature of the Tracy-Hepburn partnership was an open secret. Angela Lansbury, who worked with the pair on State of the Union, later said: "We all knew, but nobody ever said anything. In those days it wasn't discussed." Tracy was not someone to express his emotions, but Tracy's friend, actress Betsy Drake, believed that he "was utterly dependent upon Hepburn". Tracy's infidelity apparently continued, however, and he reportedly had an affair with Gene Tierney during the making of Plymouth Adventure in 1952.

Neither Tracy nor his wife ever pursued a divorce, despite their estrangement. He told Joan Fontaine, "I can get a divorce whenever I want to, but my wife and Kate like things just as they are." Louise, meanwhile, reportedly commented, "I will be Mrs. Spencer Tracy until the day I die." Hepburn did not interfere and never fought for marriage.

=== Character ===
Tracy was an avowed Catholic, but his cousin, Jane Feely, said that he did not devoutly follow the religion: "He was often not a practical Catholic either. I would call him a spiritual Catholic." Garson Kanin, a friend of Tracy's for 25 years, described him as "a true believer" who respected his religion. At periods in his life, Tracy attended Mass regularly. Tracy did not believe actors should publicize their political views, but in 1940 lent his name to the "Hollywood for Roosevelt" committee and personally identified as a Democrat.

Tracy struggled with alcoholism throughout his adult life, an ailment that ran in his father's side of the family. Rather than being a steady drinker, he was prone to periods of binging on alcohol. Loretta Young remarked that Tracy was "awful" when he was drunk, and he was twice arrested for his behavior while intoxicated. Because of this bad reaction to alcohol, Tracy regularly embarked on prolonged periods of sobriety and developed an all-or-nothing routine. Myrna Loy said: "Days of drinking had left him belligerent." Hepburn commented that he would stop drinking for "months, even years at a time" before falling off the wagon without warning.

Tracy was prone to bouts of depression and anxiety: he was described by Mrs. Tracy as having "the most volatile disposition I've ever seen—up in the clouds one minute and down in the depths the next. And when he's low, he's very, very low." He was plagued by insomnia throughout his life. As a result, Tracy became dependent on barbiturates to sleep, followed by dexedrine to function. Hepburn, who adopted a nursing role towards Tracy, was unable to understand her partner's unhappiness. She wrote in her autobiography: "What was it? ... Never at peace ... Tortured by some sort of guilt. Some terrible misery."

=== Illness and death ===
Tracy's memorial at Forest Lawn

Tracy's adult life of alcoholism, smoking cigarettes, taking pills and being overweight left him in poor health by the time he reached his 60s. On July 21, 1963, Tracy was hospitalized after a severe attack of breathlessness. Doctors found that he was suffering from pulmonary edema, a condition in which fluid accumulates in the lungs due to an inability of the heart to pump properly. They also declared his blood pressure dangerously high. From this point on Tracy remained very weak, and Hepburn moved into his home to provide constant care. In January 1965, he was diagnosed with hypertensive heart disease and also began treatment for a previously ignored diagnosis of Type II diabetes. Tracy almost died in September 1965: a stay in the hospital following a prostatectomy resulted in his kidneys failing, and he spent the night in a coma. His recovery the next day was described by his attending doctor as "a kind of miracle".

Tracy spent most of the next two years at home with Hepburn, living what she described as a quiet life: reading, painting, and listening to music. On June 10, 1967, 17 days after completing what was his last film role in Guess Who's Coming to Dinner, Tracy awakened at 3:00 am to make himself a cup of tea in his Beverly Hills apartment. Hepburn described in her autobiography how she followed him to the kitchen: "Just as I was about to give [the door] a push, there was a sound of a cup smashing to the floor—then clump—a loud clump." She entered the room to find Tracy lying dead from a heart attack. He was 67. Hepburn recalled, "He looked so happy to be done with living, which for all his accomplishments had been a frightful burden for him." MGM publicist Howard Strickling told the media that Tracy had been alone when he died and was found by his housekeeper.

A Requiem Mass was held for Tracy on June 12 at the Immaculate Heart of Mary Catholic Church in East Hollywood. Active pallbearers included George Cukor, Stanley Kramer, Frank Sinatra, James Stewart, and John Ford. Out of consideration for Tracy's family, Hepburn did not attend the funeral. Tracy is interred at Glendale's Forest Lawn Memorial Park, near his wife Louise, son John and daughter Susie.

== Reputation and acting style ==
Tracy had a solid reputation among his peers and received considerable praise from the film industry. After his death, MGM head Dore Schary said that there "can be no question that [Tracy] was the best and most protean actor of our screen". He was referred to as the greatest actor of his generation by Clark Gable, James Cagney, Humphrey Bogart, John Ford, Garson Kanin, and Katharine Hepburn. Actor Richard Widmark, who idolized Tracy, called him "the greatest movie actor there ever was" and said that he had "learned more about acting from watching Tracy than in any other way".

Tracy was particularly respected for his naturalism onscreen. Hume Cronyn, who worked with Tracy on The Seventh Cross, admired his screen presence: "His method appeared to be as simple as it is difficult to achieve. He appeared to do nothing. He listened, he felt, he said the words without forcing anything." Joan Crawford likewise expressed her admiration for Tracy's seemingly effortless performances, stating that it was "inspiring" to co-star with him and that "his is such simplicity of performance, such naturalness and humor ... he walks through a scene [and] makes it seem so easy". His four-time co-star Joan Bennett said that she "never had the feeling he was 'acting' in a scene, but the truth of the situation was actually happening, spontaneously, at the moment he spoke his lines". Cagney noted that Tracy was rarely the target of impressionists because "you can't mimic reserve and control very well ... there's nothing to imitate except his genius and that can't be mimicked".

I've never known what acting is. Who can honestly say what it is? ... I wonder what actors are supposed to be, if not themselves ... I've finally narrowed it down to where, when I begin a part, I say to myself, this is Spencer Tracy as a judge, or this is Spencer Tracy as a priest or as a lawyer, and let it go at that. Look, the only thing an actor has to offer a director and finally an audience is his instinct. That's all.

— Tracy giving his opinion on acting.

Tracy was praised for his listening and reacting skills; Barry Nelson said that he "brought the art of reacting to a new height", while Stanley Kramer declared that he "thought and listened better than anyone in the history of motion pictures". Millard Kaufman noted that Tracy "listened with every fiber of his entire body". In his memoir, Burt Reynolds noted Tracy's emphasis on naturalism when, as a rookie actor, he observed Tracy on the set of Inherit the Wind. Reynolds later introduced himself to Tracy as an actor and Tracy replied, "An actor, huh? Just remember not to ever let anyone catch you at it."

Despite the perception that he was able to turn up to a shoot and perform effortlessly, Tracy's acquaintances said that he would carefully prepare for each role in private. Joseph L. Mankiewicz lived with him during the production of Test Pilot, and recounted that Tracy would lock himself in his bedroom "working extremely hard" each night. Many co-workers commented on his strong work ethic and professionalism. However, he did not like to rehearse and would quickly lose his "effectiveness" after shooting two or three takes of the same scene. Kanin described him as "an instinctive player, who trusted the moment of creation". Tracy's close friend Chester Erskine pinpointed his acting style as one of "selection", stating that he strove to give as little as was needed to be effective and reached "a minimum to make the maximum".

Tracy disliked being asked about his technique or what advice he would give to others. He often belittled the profession of acting, once saying to Kanin, "Why do actors think they're so goddamn important? They're not. Acting is not an important job in the scheme of things. Plumbing is." He was also humble about his abilities, telling a journalist, "It's just that I try no tricks. No profile. No 'great lover' act ... I just project myself as I am—plain, trying to be honest." He was known to have enjoyed the quip once made by Alfred Lunt, "The art of acting is: learn your lines and don't bump into the furniture!" Hepburn, in an interview six years after Tracy's death, suggested that Tracy wished he had held a different profession.

== Assessment and legacy ==
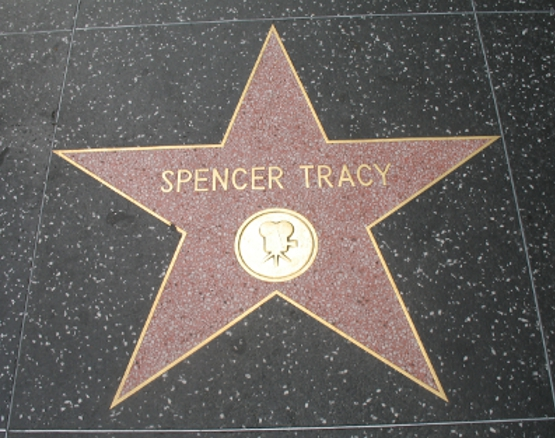
Tracy's star on the Hollywood Walk of Fame, at 6814 Hollywood Boulevard

In the 21st century, Tracy is best known to general audiences for his association with Katharine Hepburn. He continues to receive praise from film scholars: critic Leonard Maltin calls Tracy "one of the 20th century's finest actors", while film historian Jeanine Basinger describes his career as a "golden record of movie achievement". Charles Matthews, writing for The Washington Post, argues that "Tracy deserves to be remembered for himself, as a master of acting technique".

An award for excellence in film acting is bestowed in Tracy's name at the University of California, Los Angeles. Past recipients of the UCLA Spencer Tracy Award include Kirk Douglas, Michael Douglas, Morgan Freeman, Tom Hanks, Anthony Hopkins, James Stewart, and Denzel Washington.

A 1986 PBS documentary titled The Spencer Tracy Legacy was hosted by Hepburn. It includes clips from Tracy's films, and behind-the-scenes archival footage and home movies of Tracy's private life and career, as well as newly filmed interviews with many of his former co-stars, and with his daughter Susie Tracy. In 2009, Tracy provided inspiration for the character Carl in Pixar's Oscar-winning film Up. Director Pete Docter explained that there is "something sweet about these grumpy old guys". In 2014, a film about Tracy's relationship with Katharine Hepburn was announced to be in development.

Several of Tracy's films, particularly his comedies, are regarded as classics of American cinema. He starred in four of the titles on the American Film Institute's list of "100 Years ... 100 Laughs": Adam's Rib, It's a Mad, Mad, Mad, Mad World, Father of the Bride and Woman of the Year. Guess Who's Coming to Dinner was included on AFI's list of the 100 greatest American movies, while Captains Courageous was featured on their list of America's most inspiring movies.

== Awards and nominations ==
Tracy was nominated for nine Academy Awards for Best Actor, a category record he holds with Laurence Olivier. He was the first of nine actors to win the award twice, and is one of two actors to receive it consecutively, the other being Tom Hanks. Tracy was also nominated for five British Academy Film Awards, of which he won two, and four Golden Globe Awards, winning once. In addition, he received the Cannes Film Festival award for Best Actor and was once named Best Actor by the National Board of Review.

Tracy was recognized by the Academy of Motion Picture Arts and Sciences for the following performances:

- 1937: Nomination for San Francisco
- 1938: Win for Captains Courageous
- 1939: Win for Boys Town
- 1951: Nomination for Father of the Bride
- 1956: Nomination for Bad Day at Black Rock
- 1959: Nomination for The Old Man and the Sea
- 1961: Nomination for Inherit the Wind
- 1962: Nomination for Judgment at Nuremberg
- 1968: Nomination for Guess Who's Coming to Dinner (posthumous nomination)

== Filmography ==
Selected filmography:

- Up the River (1930) with Humphrey Bogart
- Quick Millions (1931)
- 20,000 Years in Sing Sing (1932) with Bette Davis
- The Power and the Glory (1933) with Colleen Moore
- Man's Castle (1933) with Loretta Young
- Whipsaw (1935) with Myrna Loy
- Fury (1936) with Sylvia Sidney
- San Francisco (1936) with Clark Gable
- Libeled Lady (1936) with Jean Harlow
- Captains Courageous (1937) with Freddie Bartholomew and Lionel Barrymore
- They Gave Him a Gun (1937)
- Mannequin (1937) with Joan Crawford and Alan Curtis
- Test Pilot (1938) with Clark Gable and Myrna Loy
- Boys Town (1938) with Mickey Rooney
- Boom Town (1940) with Clark Gable
- Edison, the Man (1940) with Gene Lockhart
- Northwest Passage (1940) with Robert Young and Walter Brennan
- Dr. Jekyll and Mr. Hyde (1941) with Ingrid Bergman
- Woman of the Year (1942) with Katharine Hepburn
- Ring of Steel (1942) as narrator
- Keeper of the Flame (1943) with Katharine Hepburn
- A Guy Named Joe (1943) with Irene Dunne
- The Seventh Cross (1944) with Hume Cronyn
- Thirty Seconds Over Tokyo (1944) with Van Johnson
- Without Love (1945) with Katharine Hepburn
- Sea of Grass (1947) with Katharine Hepburn
- State of the Union (1948) with Katharine Hepburn
- Adam's Rib (1949) with Katharine Hepburn
- Malaya (1949) with James Stewart
- Father of the Bride (1950) with Elizabeth Taylor
- Father's Little Dividend (1951) with Joan Bennett
- Plymouth Adventure (1952) with Gene Tierney
- Pat and Mike (1952) with Katharine Hepburn
- The Actress (1953) with Jean Simmons
- Broken Lance (1954) with Richard Widmark
- Bad Day at Black Rock (1955) with Robert Ryan
- The Mountain (1956) with Robert Wagner
- Desk Set (1957) with Katharine Hepburn
- The Old Man and the Sea (1958)
- The Last Hurrah (1958) with Jeffrey Hunter
- Inherit the Wind (1960) with Fredric March
- The Devil at 4 O'Clock (1961) with Frank Sinatra, Kerwin Mathews
- Judgment at Nuremberg (1961) with Burt Lancaster
- It's a Mad, Mad, Mad, Mad World (1963) with Jonathan Winters, Milton Berle, Mickey Rooney, Sid Caesar, Ethel Merman
- Guess Who's Coming to Dinner (1967) with Katharine Hepburn

== Sources ==
- Bacall, Lauren (2005). By Myself and Then Some. It Books. ISBN 0-06-075535-0.
- Berg, Scott A. (2004). Kate Remembered: Katharine Hepburn, a Personal Biography. Pocket. ISBN 0-7434-1563-9.
- Curtis, James (2011). Spencer Tracy: A Biography. London: Hutchinson. ISBN 978-0-09-178524-6.
- Deschner, Donald (1972). The Films of Spencer Tracy. Secaucus, New Jersey: The Citadel Press. ISBN 0-8065-0272-X.
- Hepburn, Katharine (1991). Me: Stories of My Life. Alfred A. Knopf. ISBN 0-679-40051-6.
- Higham, Charles (2004) [1975]. Kate: The Life of Katharine Hepburn. New York City, NY: W. W. Norton. ISBN 0-393-32598-9.
- Kanin, Garson (1971). Tracy and Hepburn: An Intimate Memoir. New York: Viking. ISBN 0-670-72293-6.
- Kramer, Joan; Heeley, David (2015). In the Company of Legends. New York: Beaufort Books. ISBN 978-0-825-30742-3.
- Swindell, Larry (1973) [1969]. Spencer Tracy. London: Coronet Books. ISBN 0-340-16951-6.
