= The Holiday =

2006 film by Nancy Meyers

- Theatrical release poster
- Directed by: Nancy Meyers
- Written by: Nancy Meyers
- Produced by: Nancy Meyers; Bruce A. Block
- Starring: Cameron Diaz; Kate Winslet; Jude Law; Jack Black; Eli Wallach; Edward Burns; Rufus Sewell
- Cinematography: Dean Cundey
- Edited by: Joe Hutshing
- Music by: Hans Zimmer
- Production companies: Columbia Pictures; Universal Pictures; Relativity Media; Waverly Films
- Distributed by: Sony Pictures Releasing; (United States and Canada); United International Pictures; (international)
- Release dates: November 29, 2006 (New York City); December 8, 2006 (United States)
- Running time: 136 minutes
- Country: United States
- Language: English
- Budget: $85 million
- Box office: $205.8 million

The Holiday is a 2006 American romantic comedy film written and directed by Nancy Meyers. Co-produced by Meyers and Bruce A. Block, the film was shot in both California and England. It stars Cameron Diaz and Kate Winslet as Amanda and Iris, two lovelorn women from opposite sides of the Atlantic Ocean, who arrange a home exchange to escape heartbreak during the Christmas and holiday season. Jude Law and Jack Black play the film's leading men Graham and Miles, with Eli Wallach, Edward Burns, and Rufus Sewell playing supporting roles.

The Holiday premiered in New York City on November 29, 2006, before it was released theatrically in the United States on December 8, 2006. It was distributed by Sony Pictures Releasing in the United States and Canada and by United International Pictures overseas. The film was a box office success, grossing $205.8 million worldwide against a production budget of $85 million. It received generally mixed reviews from critics upon release, with praise for its visual design and the performances of the cast, but criticism for its predictable plot.

== Plot ==
Iris Simpkins, a society columnist for The Daily Telegraph in London, is obsessively in love with her ex-boyfriend and colleague, Jasper Bloom. Even though he cheated on her and is seeing someone else, Jasper has been keeping Iris close by "remaining friends". When his engagement is announced at the company Christmas party, Iris is devastated.

Amanda Woods, owner of a Los Angeles film trailer production company, breaks up with her film composer boyfriend, Ethan, after he cheats on her, citing her emotional unavailability. Finding Iris's Surrey cottage listed on a home swap website, she messages her, and they agree to switch homes for two weeks starting the next day.

Iris happily settles into Amanda's large house, but Amanda has trouble adjusting to quiet English country life and decides to return home the next day. That night, Iris's brother Graham drops by after drinking excessively at the local pub, seeking to spend the night. Amanda agrees, and after they talk, Graham unexpectedly kisses her on the lips; she suggests they have sex because she does not expect to see him ever again. The next day, despite enjoying their time together, they go their separate ways. However, Amanda decides to stay and continue seeing Graham.

Iris meets Arthur Abbott, Amanda's elderly neighbor, an Oscar-winning screenwriter from the Golden Age of Hollywood. Over dinner, Iris reveals her troubles with Jasper, and Arthur recommends a list of classic films with strong female characters, such as The Lady Eve, so she can become the "leading lady" of her own life. She returns his kindness by helping him prepare for a Writers Guild of America gala in his honor. Meanwhile, Iris befriends Miles, a colleague of Ethan's who is dating aspiring actress Maggie. After he catches Maggie with another man, Iris and Miles bond over their similar relationship troubles, and dine together on Christmas Eve.

Amanda and Graham grow closer, but she assumes she is one of many women in his life. Surprising him one evening at his house, she discovers he is a widower with two young daughters, Sophie and Olivia. He reveals that he never tells new romantic partners about his daughters, because compartmentalizing his life helps him deal with the overwhelming responsibility of being a single working father. Furthermore, Graham does not want to bring a woman into the girls' lives unless the relationship definitely has a future.

On the day of the gala, Maggie asks Miles to take her back, but he refuses. Jasper surprises Iris by showing up and wanting to reignite their romance. However, when he admits he is still engaged, she rejects him. At the gala, Arthur gives a rousing speech. Miles asks Iris out for New Year's Eve, offering to travel to England so they can be together. Iris accepts and they kiss.

Graham tells Amanda he has fallen in love with her, and while she does not say it back, they agree to try to make a long-distance relationship work. While heading to the airport, Amanda cries for the first time since childhood, so she returns to the cottage, where she finds Graham in tears as well. They decide to spend New Year's Eve together with his daughters, then embrace. Iris, Amanda, Miles, Graham, Sophie, and Olivia celebrate New Year's Eve together at Graham's house.

== Cast ==
- Cameron Diaz as Amanda Woods: the owner of a successful production company that specializes in film trailers. A fan of Meyers' work, Diaz signed on after reading parts of the script. Commenting on her decision to play Amanda, Diaz said that her character "was totally relatable to because we've all had these relationships that fail. But I loved the bravery that she displays. She ... learns about who she is and opens herself up to possibilities she's never allowed herself to have before. I felt that was such a wonderful message to put out there." Meyers, who envisioned casting her still during the writing process, compared Diaz's performance in the film to Goldie Hawn's, complimenting her adeptness at physical comedy: "It's really hard I think to be that cute and sexy and that funny and that sort of girl-friendly ... She seemed absolutely the right choice for a California girl", she commented. In developing her character, Diaz also improvised on set: "There were a few scenes that were written on the page but then Nancy and I fooled around with them a bit. We didn’t want to take it [the comedy] too broad. We wanted it to be believable, so we included realistic moments", she said.
- Kate Winslet as Iris Simpkins: a society columnist, writing for The Daily Telegraph. Winslet was handpicked by Meyers, who wrote all of Iris's lines with Winslet in mind. The character was named Iris after Jude Law's young daughter. A fan of Meyers' previous work on Something's Gotta Give (2003), Winslet, then primarily known for her portrayals in period films, "loved the idea" of playing a contemporary English woman in a romantic comedy, a genre she had not done before. Winslet said she had initially felt "nervous and ... scared about trying to be funny" at times, stating that "Jude [Law] and I would speak on the telephone a lot before we started shooting, 'Oh my god, they're going to fire us, they're going to recast, what if we don't make them laugh?" In preparing for her role, Winslet watched screwball comedies from the 1940s, such as His Girl Friday and The Philadelphia Story, to study the dialogues and performances.
- Jude Law as Graham Simpkins: Iris' brother, a book editor, "countryside widower", and single father raising his two daughters (Miffy Englefield as Sophie, and Emma Pritchard as Olivia) by himself after his wife's death. Robert Downey Jr. auditioned for the role. Law accepted the role as he was interested in playing a type of character that he had never played on film before. After his appearances in a string of period dramas and science fiction films in the early to mid-2000s, Law found it tricky to approach the contemporary role of Graham. Like Winslet, he felt more vulnerable playing a character who fitted his own look and did not require an accent, a costume or a relocation. Meyers, who was not immediately sure if Law was going to fit into the genre and whose character evolved more during the writing than the others, decided to cast him after a meeting in which they went through the script together. In preparing for his role, Meyers sent him a collection of Clark Gable films to prepare the performance that she wanted in The Holiday.
- Jack Black as Miles Dumont: a Hollywood film composer working with Amanda and an affiliate of her boyfriend, Ethan. Jimmy Fallon auditioned for the role. As with Diaz and Winslet, Meyers specially created the character for Black after watching his performance in the musical comedy film School of Rock (2003). On his cast, Meyers commented that "when I was thinking of this movie I thought he was someone I would like to write a part for and I'm aware he's not Clark Gable, he's not tall dark and handsome, but he's adorable, he's lovable. It's my way of saying this is the right kind of guy, this is what most guys look like if they're lucky, he's so adorable, and why not?" Cast against type, Black felt "flattered [and] a little bit nervous" about Meyers' approach to star in a rom-com, though he eventually agreed to sign on upon learning that he would play opposite Winslet. While he felt it was difficult to find the adorable side in his role, Black appreciated Miles' relationship with music, stating, "I could relate to that Miles was a film composer and I just got done composing my music for my score. So I knew about that world."
- Eli Wallach as Arthur Abbott: Amanda's neighbor, a famous screenwriter from the Golden Age of Hollywood whom Iris befriends. Wallach was 90 years old when The Holiday was filmed. Meyers found him so animated and energetic on the set that she had to remind him several times during filming to slow down, move more slowly, and act more like an older man.

Edward Burns appears as Ethan, Amanda's unfaithful composer boyfriend whom she breaks up with in the beginning of the film, while Rufus Sewell plays Jasper Bloom, Iris's emotionally needy ex-boyfriend. Shannyn Sossamon plays Maggie, Miles's actress girlfriend. Sewell and Sossamon reunite as they both starred in A Knight's Tale (2001) together, although they do not share a scene. The film also cast Bill Macy as Ernie and Shelley Berman as Norman, friends of Arthur, as well as Kathryn Hahn as Bristol and John Krasinski as Ben, Amanda's employees. Jon Prescott appears as Maggie's short-time affair.

Dustin Hoffman appears in the video rental store in an uncredited cameo as Jack Black talks about the score from The Graduate (1967). According to Hoffman, this was unscripted and unexpected. He was going to Blockbuster Video to rent a film when he saw the lighting from the film production crew and walked over to see what was happening. He knew director Nancy Meyers, who scripted a short scene with him in it.

Lindsay Lohan, who had made her feature film debut in Meyers' 1998 remake of Disney's 1961 film The Parent Trap, and James Franco, a friend of Meyers, make uncredited appearances in the trailer of the fictional action film Christmas Day, which Amanda and her team finish at the beginning of The Holiday. Veteran voice-over talent Hal Douglas was the narrator for the trailer, as well as other "trailers" that describe Amanda's situation at various points in the film. Alex O'Loughlin and Odette Yustman play a kissing couple in a fictional film in the opening scene as Miles composes the music for the scene.

== Production ==
Filming on location in Godalming

Production on The Holiday began in Los Angeles, then moved to England for a month before completing filming back in California. Principal photography began in the Brentwood area on the Westside of Los Angeles, where real Santa Ana winds reportedly gave Meyers and her team a winter day as warm as scripted in the screenplay. Although Amanda's home is set in Brentwood, the exterior scenes at the gated property were actually filmed in front of Southern California architect Wallace Neff's Mission Revival house in San Marino, a suburb adjacent to Pasadena. Neff had built the house for his family in 1928. The interiors of Amanda's house were filmed at Sony Pictures Studios in Culver City. Other Los Angeles locations included Arthur's house in Brentwood and Miles's house, designed by Richard Neutra, which is situated on Neutra Place in L.A.'s Silver Lake area, near downtown.

The UK part of the film was partially shot in Godalming and Shere, respectively a town and village in the county of Surrey in South East England that dates back to the 11th century. The cottage's exterior was constructed in a field adjacent to St James's Church in Shere. The production team had sourced a genuine cottage but it was located a considerable distance from London, where the crew was based, so they opted to construct one for filming. The restaurant exterior is the manor house at Cornwell, Oxfordshire.

Filming began on January 4, 2006, and concluded on June 15, 2006. Charles Shyer directed Lohan and Franco's scenes for the fictional film trailer made by Diaz's character.

== Reception ==
=== Box office ===
The Holiday opened at number three on the United States box office, raking in $12,778,913 in the weekend of December 8, 2006. Altogether, it made $63 million at the North American domestic box office, and $142 million at the international box office. The film grossed a total of $205,841,885, worldwide, against a production budget of $85 million. It became the twelfth highest-grossing film of the 2000s to be helmed by a female director.

=== Critical response ===
In her review for USA Today, Claudia Puig found that The Holiday "is a rare chick flick/romantic comedy that, despite its overt sentimentality and fairy-tale premise, doesn't feel cloyingly sweet." She felt that "much of the credit goes to inspired casting and the actors' chemistry." Carina Chocano, writing for the Los Angeles Times noted that "like a magic trick in reverse, The Holiday reveals the mechanics of the formula while trying to keep up the illusion." She complimented Winslet and Law's performances, but was critical toward Diaz, who she felt "strikes the off-note, but then you tend to think it's not her fault." Rex Reed from The New York Observer noted that "at least 90% of The Holiday is a stocking-stuffer from Tiffany's ... so loaded with charm that it makes you glow all over and puts a smile in your heart." While he felt that the final 15 minutes of film "diminish a lot of the film's good intentions," he added that Meyers had "created some hearth-cozy situations, written some movie-parody zingers, and provided Eli Wallach with his best role in years."

On Rotten Tomatoes, the film has an approval rating of 51% based on 160 reviews with an average rating of 5.70/10. The site's critical consensus states "While it's certainly sweet and even somewhat touching, The Holiday is so thoroughly predictable that audiences may end up opting for an early check-out time." On Metacritic it has a score of 52 out of 100 based on reviews from 31 critics, indicating "mixed or average reviews". Audiences polled by CinemaScore gave it a grade A−.

Owen Gleiberman of Entertainment Weekly graded the film with a B− rating, summing it as a "cookie-cutter chick flick." He concluded that "it's a self-consciously old-fashioned premise, with too much sub-Bridget Jones dithering, but Nancy Meyers' dialogue has a perky synthetic sheen." Justin Chang from Variety wrote that while "Meyers' characters tend to be more thoughtful and self-aware (or at least more self-conscious) than most ... this overlong film isn't nearly as smart as it would like to appear, and it willingly succumbs to the very rom-com cliches it pretends to subvert." He added, that "in a spirited cast ... the Brits easily outshine their Yank counterparts. Winslet weeps and moans without sacrificing her radiance or sympathy, while the marginally less teary-eyed Law effortlessly piles on the charm in a role that will have some amusing resonances for tabloid readers." Ruthe Stein of the San Francisco Chronicle remarked that the film was "the most love-centric movie since Love Actually." She felt that The Holiday "has charming moments and a hopeful message for despondent singles, but it lacks the emotional resonance of Meyers' Something's Gotta Give (2003) and the zaniness of What Women Want (2000). Clocking in at 2 hours and 16 minutes, Holiday is ridiculously long for a romantic comedy and would benefit from losing at least a half-hour."

=== Accolades ===
List of awards and nominations
Award	Category	Recipients	Result
ALMA Awards	Outstanding Actress - Motion Picture	Cameron Diaz	Nominated
Irish Film & Television Awards	Best International Actress (People's Choice)	Kate Winslet	Nominated
NRJ Ciné Awards	Meilleur baiser ("Best Kiss")	Cameron Diaz; Jude Law	Nominated
Teen Choice Awards	Choice Movie: Chick Flick	—N/a	Won
Teen Choice Awards	Choice Movie: Hissy Fit	Cameron Diaz	Nominated

== Soundtrack ==
=== Soundtrack album ===
The Holiday

Soundtrack album by Hans Zimmer, Heitor Pereira, various artists
- Released: December 5, 2006
- Recorded: September 2006
- Genre: Film soundtrack
- Length: 48:12
- Label: Varèse Sarabande
- Producers: Hans Zimmer, Nancy Meyers, Robert Townson

The official soundtrack contains music by various artists, Heitor Pereira, and Hans Zimmer and was released on the Varèse Sarabande label.

1. "Maestro" by Hans Zimmer - 3:53
2. "Iris and Jasper" by Hans Zimmer and Lorne Balfe - 3:24
3. "Kayak for One" by Ryeland Allison - 1:30
4. "Zero" by Hans Zimmer and Atli Örvarsson - 2:44
5. "Dream Kitchen" by Hans Zimmer and Henry Jackman - 1:35
6. "Separate Vacations" by Hans Zimmer, Lorne Balfe and Imogen Heap - 1:47
7. "Anything Can Happen" by Hans Zimmer and Heitor Pereira - 0:48
8. "Light My Fire" by Hans Zimmer - 1:14
9. "Definitely Unexpected" by Hans Zimmer and Lorne Balfe - 3:34
10. "If I Wanted To Call You" by Hans Zimmer and Atli Örvarsson - 1:50
11. "Roadside Rhapsody" by Hans Zimmer and Henry Jackman - 1:39
12. "Busy Guy" by Hans Zimmer and Henry Jackman - 1:28
13. "For Nancy" by Hans Zimmer, Atli Orvarsson and Lorne Balfe - 1:27
14. "It's Complicated" by Hans Zimmer and Imogen Heap - 1:00
15. "Kiss Goodbye" by Heitor Pereira and Herb Alpert - 2:33
16. "Verso E Prosa" by Heitor Pereira - 1:59
17. "Meu Passado" by Hans Zimmer, Henry Jackman and Lorne Balfe - 1:25
18. "The 'Cowch'" by Hans Zimmer, Heitor Pereira, Lorne Balfe and Imogen Heap - 2:42
19. "Three Musketeers" by Hans Zimmer, Heitor Pereira, Lorne Balfe and Imogen Heap - 2:44
20. "Christmas Surprise" by Hans Zimmer and Lorne Balfe - 2:32
21. "Gumption" by Hans Zimmer, Atli Orvarsson and Henry Jackman - 3:45
22. "Cry" by Hans Zimmer, Lorne Balfe and Heitor Pereira - 2:39
23. "It's a Shame" by The Spinners
24. "You Send Me" by Aretha Franklin

=== Other music ===
- In the plane, the "trailer" about Amanda's life uses the song "Best of My Love" by The Emotions.
- When Amanda arrives in England, she plays a CD and then starts singing along with The Killers their biggest hit "Mr. Brightside" while drinking.
- The first time Iris wakes up in Amanda's house, the song that resumes playing is "Are You Gonna Be My Girl" by Jet.
- When Amanda is in the bath, the "trailer" about her uses the song "Got to Be Real" by Cheryl Lynn.
- In the video rental store, Miles (Jack Black) sings the theme tune of Driving Miss Daisy by "Hans." Hans Zimmer also composed and produced the score for The Holiday. Jack Black later spoofed the film in Be Kind Rewind.
- The bar scene where Graham (Jude Law) enters looking for Amanda (Cameron Diaz), features "Let Go" by Frou Frou.

== Rumored sequel ==
In December 2022, it was rumored that a sequel to The Holiday was in pre-production, with Cameron Diaz, Jude Law, Kate Winslet, and Jack Black all signing on to reprise their roles from the original. However, Meyers and Winslet both denied the rumor.

== See also ==
- Tara Road
- Meet cute
- List of Christmas films
- List of films featuring fictional films
