= Baby Boom (American TV series) =

- Genre: Sitcom
- Created by: Nancy Meyers and Charles Shyer
- Starring: Kate Jackson
- Composer: Steve Tyrell
- Country of origin: United States
- Original language: English
- No. of seasons: 1
- No. of episodes: 13 (3 unaired)

Production
- Executive producer: Winifred Hervey-Stallworth
- Producers: Bruce A. Block; Mark Reisman and Jeremy Stevens
- Camera setup: Single-camera
- Production companies: Nancy Meyers-Charles Shyer Productions; Finnegan/Pinchuk Productions; MGM/UA Television

Original release
- Network: NBC
- Release: September 10, 1988 – September 10, 1989

Baby Boom is an American television sitcom based on the 1987 film of the same name, created by Nancy Meyers and Charles Shyer, and starring Kate Jackson. The pilot premiered on NBC on September 10, 1988, and the series aired from November 2, 1988, to September 10, 1989.

Sam Wanamaker and the baby twins Kristina and Michelle Kennedy reprised their roles from the film, but otherwise, the characters picked up from the original film were cast with new actors. J.C. Wiatt was played by Kate Jackson, Helga Von Haupt by Joy Behar and Charlotte Elkman by Susie Essman.

== Cast ==
=== Main ===
- Kate Jackson as J.C. Wiatt
- Daniel Bardol as Ken Arrenberg
- Joy Behar as Helga Von Haupt
- Susie Essman as Charlotte Elkman
- Kristina and Michelle Kennedy as Elizabeth Alice Wiatt (Note: Cheryl Chase dubbed over the voice for Elizabeth Alice Wiatt.)
- Robyn Peterson as Arlene Mandell
- Sam Wanamaker as Fritz Curtis
- Camille Saviola as Ofelia

=== Guest starring ===
- Jane Elliot as Julie
- Robin Thomas as Rob Marks

== Production ==
At the insistence of series creators Nancy Meyers and Charles Shyer, the show was made without a laugh track. In December 1988, NBC announced that the series would go on hiatus after the December 21 episode. The network had planned on bringing the show back after making certain "creative changes", but only three leftover episodes aired in the summer of 1989.

== Episodes ==
Eight episodes have registered production codes with the United States Copyright Office.

No.	Title	Directed by	Written by	Original release date	Prod. code	Viewers (millions)
1	"Pilot"	Charles Shyer	Nancy Meyers and Charles Shyer	September 10, 1988	8401	33.1
2	"Guilt"	Ron Lagomarsino; Bruce A. Block	Nancy Meyers and Charles Shyer	November 2, 1988	8406	14.9
3	"The Center"	Tom Schiller	Nancy Meyers and Charles Shyer	November 9, 1988	8407	18.3
4	"Stress"	Mary Kay Place	Donald Margulies	November 16, 1988	8404	17.2
5	"Saturday"	Robert Klane	Nat Bernstein and Mitchel Katlin	November 30, 1988	8408	17.0
6	"The Club"	Alan Mandel	Winifred Hervey-Stallworth	December 14, 1988	8409	15.3
7	"I'll Be Home for Christmas"	Bruce A. Block	Donald Margulies	December 21, 1988	8410	17.5
8	"One Wednesday"	Max Tash	Carrie Honigblum and Renee Phillips	July 13, 1989	8411	18.4
9	"X-y-l-o-p-h-o-n-e"	Jeffrey D. Brown	Wayne Terwilliger	August 14, 1989	8412	15.3
10	"When It Rains"	John Whitesell	Patricia Irving, J.W. Melville, and Winifred Hervey-Stallworth	September 10, 1989	8415	9.2
11	"A Fine Romance"	N/A	Donald Margulies	Unaired	8414	N/A
12	"Charlotte's Secret"	N/A	Mark Reisman and Jeremy Stevens	Unaired	8416	N/A
13	"J.C. – The Man"	N/A	Mark Reisman, Jeremy Stevens, Carrie Honigblum, and Renee Phillips	Unaired	8417	N/A
