= Baby Boom (film) =

1987 film by Charles Shyer

- Theatrical release poster
- Directed by: Charles Shyer
- Written by: Nancy Meyers; Charles Shyer
- Produced by: Nancy Meyers; Bruce A. Block
- Starring: Diane Keaton; Harold Ramis; Sam Wanamaker; Sam Shepard
- Cinematography: William A. Fraker
- Edited by: Lynzee Klingman
- Music by: Bill Conti
- Production company: United Artists
- Distributed by: MGM/UA Communications Co.
- Release dates: September 17, 1987 (Toronto); October 30, 1987 (United States)
- Running time: 110 minutes
- Country: United States
- Language: English
- Budget: $15 million
- Box office: $26 million

Baby Boom is a 1987 American comedy-drama film directed by Charles Shyer, written by Nancy Meyers and Shyer, and produced by Meyers and Bruce A. Block for United Artists. It stars Diane Keaton as a yuppie who discovers that a long-lost cousin has died, leaving her a 14-month-old baby girl she named as inheritance.

The film received generally favorable reviews and was a modest box-office success during its original run, eventually grossing $26 million. The film spawned a television series of the same name (1988–1989) and was nominated for two Golden Globe Awards.

== Plot ==
J.C. Wiatt is a driven management consultant (nicknamed the "Tiger Lady") committed to her demanding job. She lives with her boyfriend Steven Buchner, an investment banker. They are happily focused on their careers and have no interest in having children. Notified that a distant cousin has died and left her a bequest, J.C. is shocked to discover that her "inheritance" is Elizabeth, the cousin's orphaned baby. Unwilling to disrupt her hectic life and clueless about childcare, J.C. arranges to give Elizabeth up for adoption, but she grows attached to her. She decides to become a working parent and to raise Elizabeth, something Steven has no desire to partake in. They amicably break up, and he moves out.

J.C.'s boss, Fritz Curtis, offers her a chance to become a partner at the firm. CEO Hughes Larrabee is interested in having her manage the account of The Food Chain, a major company. Adjusting to life with Elizabeth, J.C. lands the account, and her protégé Ken Arrenberg is assigned to her team. Struggling to balance her work and home life, J.C. hires a series of nannies and enrolls Elizabeth in early development classes. When she discovers Ken making decisions without her input, J.C. tells Fritz she wants him off her team. To her surprise, Fritz informs her that for the good of the company, Ken will be in charge of the account and J.C. will be reassigned to a lower-profile client. Postponing her promotion, Fritz explains that he too was forced to choose between career and family.

Humiliated, J.C. quits and moves with Elizabeth to a farmhouse in Vermont. Purchasing the house without first having seen it in person or having it inspected, she finds it is riddled with problems. By winter, she needs a new heating system, a new roof, and new means to get running water.

With money low, and patience even lower, J.C. suffers a nervous breakdown, and faints following an outburst. She wakes up in the office of local veterinarian Dr. Jeff Cooper. She resists Jeff's overtures, as she is focused on returning to New York City, but finding a buyer for the house proves almost impossible. She sees an opportunity to sell "gourmet" baby food applesauce she had concocted for Elizabeth from fresh ingredients. After a rough start, it grows into a full-fledged business named Country Baby. As her business expands and rapid orders start, J.C. and Jeff strike up a romance.

Later, Fritz contacts J.C. with an offer from The Food Chain to acquire Country Baby, and she returns to her former firm to meet with Larrabee and her former colleagues. They outline the multi-million-dollar deal to buy her company and distribute its products, offering her a lucrative salary with a Manhattan apartment and other juicy benefits. Overwhelmed and flattered, J.C. considers Fritz's offer, but suddenly realizes that returning to her old working life would destroy everything she's built. Declining, she returns to Vermont, happy with her new life as Elizabeth's mother, as the CEO of a burgeoning business, and in her relationship with Jeff.

== Cast ==
- Diane Keaton as J.C. Wiatt
- Sam Shepard as Dr. Jeff Cooper
- Harold Ramis as Steven Buchner
- Sam Wanamaker as Fritz Curtis
- James Spader as Ken Arrenberg
- Pat Hingle as Hughes Larrabee
- Britt Leach as Verne Boone
- Carol Gillies as a Nanny
- Annie Golden as a Nanny
- Chris Noth as Yuppie Husband
- Linda Ellerbee as Narrator
- Kim Sebastian as Robin
- Mary Gross as Charlotte Elkman
- Kristina & Michelle Kennedy as Elizabeth Alice Wiatt (Note: Cheryl Chase provided vocal effects for Elizabeth Alice Wiatt)
- Victoria Jackson as Eve
- Benjamin Diskin as Ben
- Beverly Todd as Ann Brown
- Jane Elliot as Park Mom

== Production ==
The film was shot on location in Los Angeles, New York City, and Peru, Vermont. Filming took place from November 5, 1986, to February 3, 1987.

== Reception ==
=== Box office ===
The film debuted at #3 at the domestic box office, behind Fatal Attraction and Hello Again. It earned a respectable $1,608,924 in its opening weekend in the U.S. and earned approximately $26,712,476 in its entire run.

=== Critical response ===
On Rotten Tomatoes, the film has an approval rating of 70%, based on reviews from 46 critics. The consensus states: "Baby Boom struggles to impart its feminist ideals, but Diane Keaton's winsome leading work helps keep things breezily entertaining." On Metacritic, it has a score of 53% based on reviews from 9 critics, indicating "mixed or average" reviews. Audiences polled by CinemaScore gave the film an average grade of "B+" on an A+ to F scale.

Janet Maslin of The New York Times wrote the film "isn't much more than a glorified sitcom, but it's funny, and it's liable to hit home." Kevin Thomas of the Los Angeles Times wrote the filmmakers were "not afraid to be sophisticated and screwballish in the best '30s tradition, and they know just how far to exaggerate for laughs without leaving touch with reality entirely or destroying sentiment. The humor in Baby Boom is sharp without being heartless." Roger Ebert gave the film three out of four stars, stating that "all of [the film's storyline] is too good to be true, of course, but that's why I enjoyed it." "Baby Boom makes no effort to show us real life. It is a fantasy about mothers and babies and sweetness and love, with just enough wicked comedy to give it an edge. The screenplay, written by producer Nancy Meyers and director Charles Shyer, has some of the same literate charm as their previous film, Irreconcilable Differences, and some of the same sly observation of a generation that wages an interior war between selfishness and good nature."

Keaton's performance was noted by Pauline Kael from The New Yorker, who described it as "a glorious comedy performance that rides over many of the inanities in this picture...Keaton is smashing: The Tiger Lady's having all this drive is played for farce and Keaton keeps you alert to every shade of pride and panic the character feels. She's an ultra-feminine executive, a wide-eyed charmer, with a breathless ditziness that may remind you of Jean Arthur in The More the Merrier."

Baby Boom's writers combat a one-dimensional review in which American journalist, writer, and university professor Caryn James expresses her distaste in J.C. "abandon[ing] a high-powered Manhattan career for the joys of life in Vermont with a baby and Sam Shepard." The article, published on August 13, 1989, by The New York Times, explains how J.C.'s search for equality prompted her to leave her elite New York position. According to its writers, Baby Boom depicts "the increasing prejudice women face today" stereotyped into two categories – the sweet caregiver or the self-reliant businesswoman – and aims to destroy that outdated mindset.

=== Accolades ===
- Golden Globe for Best Actress in a Comedy or Musical - Diane Keaton (Nominated)
- Golden Globe Best Motion Picture Comedy or Musical (Nominated)
- National Society of Film Critics Award for Best Actress - Diane Keaton (Nominated)
- American Comedy Awards Funniest Actress in a Motion Picture - Diane Keaton (Nominated)

== Remake ==
In November 2025, Michael Showalter was announced to direct a remake for Amazon MGM Studios.
