= I Love Trouble (1994 film) =

- Theatrical release poster
- Directed by: Charles Shyer
- Written by: Charles Shyer; Nancy Meyers
- Produced by: Nancy Meyers
- Starring: Julia Roberts; Nick Nolte; Saul Rubinek; Robert Loggia; James Rebhorn
- Cinematography: John Lindley
- Edited by: Walter Murch
- Music by: David Newman
- Production companies: Touchstone Pictures; Caravan Pictures
- Distributed by: Buena Vista Pictures Distribution
- Release date: June 29, 1994 (U.S.)
- Running time: 123 minutes
- Country: United States
- Language: English
- Budget: $45 million
- Box office: $61.9 million

I Love Trouble is a 1994 American romantic action comedy film starring Julia Roberts and Nick Nolte. It was written and produced by the husband-and-wife team of Nancy Meyers and Charles Shyer, and directed by Shyer. I Love Trouble was released by Buena Vista Pictures Distribution on June 29, 1994. The film received negative reviews from critics and underperformed at the box office.

== Plot ==
Peter Brackett, a famous reporter from Chicago Chronicle, meets Sabrina Peterson, a budding one from Chicago Globe. Both cover a train crash from different angles, and a competition begins.

Danny Brown calls Sabrina, and says he picked up a briefcase at the site of the crash. She goes to meet him at a deserted building, but finds him with a bullet in his head, and "LDI" written on his palm. A thin man with a briefcase watches her drive away.

Sabrina and Peter see each other at night in an elevator. A gunman targets them, but they evade him and he falls down from above the elevator. A paper with "307" falls from his person.

They go to see Mrs. Beekman, where Sabrina wants to quit the story and Peter agrees. But they soon see one another again on the same flight on side by side seats, indicating that neither actually quit. He suggests teaming up, but they spy on each other.

They summarize their findings that Beekman, a genetic pioneer, died a week before the train crash. His son had something on a briefcase, and dies in the crash. Peter writes LDF on a piece of paper, which is genetically engineered hormone LDF. The thief of the briefcase had LDI on his palm - couldn't finish the last letter "F".

They speak with Sam, who says that Wilson Chess could revolutionize the dairy industry - a profit of $1 billion per year. A car tries to run them all over, but they manage to dive away.

Wilson Chess meets with Sabrina and Peter on his company property, and they discover that Chess was expelled from Yale because he burned down the English building as a revenge act, along with classmate Vargas.

Sabrina and Peter meet up at a restaurant and look at a photo taken of the company employees at a party: they identify Chess, Beekman and Harvey, a research scientist. They theorize that the LDF had a problem. Chess wanted to fake results, but Beekman refused. Beekman took the true results and gave them to his son, who was murdered on the train. They drive out of the restaurant, and a man points a gun at them from the back seat. They get rid of him by driving fast, but the car breaks down in the forest. Eventually they meet a bunch of campers and are rescued.

Walking on the streets of Nevada, they are followed by the thin man. To escape him, they enter a wedding chapel and pretend to get married, but are married for real. They decide to have their marriage annulled in the morning.

Peter returns to Chess, and sees Sabrina undercover as a guide, who has him thrown out because she wants to have the exclusive story. Sam tells Wilson Chess that Sabrina is working at his company.

While getting on the plane, Peter calls Sam, and is told that his phone is extension 307 - same as note on the paper that the gunman had earlier. Peter realizes that Sam is with Chess, so he gets down and hitchhikes a ride to Chess.

Sabrina tries a disk at Chess and decodes it, but Sam finds her, and reveals that he is Vargas. The Thin man and Chess also arrive and they agree to kill Sabrina to destroy the evidence. Sabrina sees Peter hiding and asks for the dying wish as the interview to know what really transpired. Turns out that the LDF hormone causes cancer in lab animals. Beekman was the whistle-blower who wanted to broadcast the results, which Chess couldn't allow. Peter switches the lights off on the lab, and in the fight that ensues, both the Thin man and Sam/Vargas are killed. Sabrina had the microfilm with her, and both the Globe and the Chronicle run the story about the Chess company knowingly selling a product that causes

== Cast ==
- Julia Roberts as Sabrina Peterson
- Nick Nolte as Peter Brackett
- Saul Rubinek as Sam Smotherman/Ernesto Vargas
- Robert Loggia as Matt Greenfield, Chronicle Editor
- James Rebhorn as the thin man
- Charles Martin Smith as Rick Medwick
- Lisa Lu as Virginia Harvey
- Dan Butler as Wilson Chess
- Eugene Levy as Justice of the Peace
- Nora Dunn as Lindy
- Paul Gleason as Kenny Bacon
- Kelly Rutherford as Kim
- Olympia Dukakis as Jeannie, Peter's secretary
- Marsha Mason as Senator Gayle Robbins
- Jane Adams as Evans
- Megan Cavanagh as Mrs. Delores Beekman
- Clark Gregg as Darryl Beekman, Jr.
- Anna Holbrook as woman in sportscar
- Jay Wolpert as passing writer
- Andy Milder as copy man
- Dorothy Lyman as Suzie
- Keith Gordon as Andy
- Joseph D'Onofrio as Sully
- Barry Sobel as delivery person
- Frankie Faison as Police Chief
- Stuart Pankin as society photographer
- James 'Kimo' Wills as Danny Brown
- Patrick St. Esprit as assassin
- Paul Hirsch as man on plane
- Jessica Lundy as flight attendant #1
- Nestor Serrano as Pecos
- Robin Duke as Sandra
- Bruce A. Block as man at newsstand
- Hallie Meyers-Shyer as little girl in barn

== Production ==
In February 1993 it was announced Nolte had been cast as one of the leads. Nolte and Roberts notoriously did not get along with each other during the making of the film. Nolte, who has since disowned the film, felt that he sold his soul by doing it, and that he did it only for the money. As a result, he was tense while on the set, and did not have a good working relationship with Julia Roberts. Roberts has, on her part, called Nolte the worst actor with whom she has ever worked. She also has described him as "disgusting", whereas Nolte has said she's "not a nice person".

== Reception ==
The film grossed over $30 million in box-office receipts in the United States and less than $62 million worldwide.

On Rotten Tomatoes, the film has an approval rating of 22% rating based on 46 reviews. The site's consensus states: "There appears to be no Love lost between the fatally mismatched coupling of Julia Roberts and Nick Nolte in this screwball misfire that just isn't worth the Trouble." Audiences surveyed by CinemaScore gave the film a grade B on scale of A to F.

Todd McCarthy of Variety wrote: "The goings-on seem lacking in wit and inspiration, tolerably entertaining but far from effervescent." Roger Ebert of the Chicago Sun-Times wrote: "Maybe it would have been funnier if the evil cow conglomerate had been replaced by something sillier and more lightweight; it's hard to sustain a romantic comedy in the face of death threats."

Kenneth Turan of the Los Angeles Times wrote that "it's a good thing I Love Trouble loves trouble, because trouble is just what it's in." He added:

Although Julia Roberts and Nick Nolte beaming out at the world from "Trouble" posters everywhere point to a light and frothy concoction, that's not what filmmaking team Nancy Meyers and Charles Shyer (she produces, he directs, they both write) have delivered. On screens instead is a stab at the kind of thriller/romance combination that Alfred Hitchcock turned out in treats like "North by Northwest."

But, instead of the charm and the suspense complementing each other in the classic manner, they drag each other down. The film's jeopardy sequences are ineffectual and cast a pall over the romantic comedy aspects, which are not especially entrancing despite the star power. Instead of synergy, what "Trouble" achieves is more like disappointment squared.

No one expects movies like this one, set as it is in the largely mythological world of fiercely competitive daily newspapering, to be realistic. But neither should they be as flaccid and unconvincing as what we are presented with here.

A mildly positive review of the film was contributed by Caryn James of The New York Times, who told her readers, "don't go to I Love Trouble looking for realism. And don't even bother comparing it to the classic spar-until-they-fall-in-love movies of the 30's and 40's, even if this film begs an audience to make that self-defeating connection. I Love Trouble is breezy summer escapism, and taken on those light-spirited terms it is loaded with charm. Ms. Roberts has her best role since Pretty Woman, a part that plays up her unmistakable Audrey Hepburn allure. And Mr. Nolte shows a surprising flair for this kind of blithe comedy. They may not be the first couple that pops into mind to play gritty, love-resisting reporters, but they make the film an appealing, easy-to-take confection."

== Year-end lists ==
- Sixth worst – Peter Travers, Rolling Stone
- Top 12 worst (Alphabetically ordered, not ranked) – David Elliott, The San Diego Union-Tribune
- Dishonorable mention – Glenn Lovell, San Jose Mercury News
- Dishonorable mention – Dan Craft, The Pantagraph
- Worst (not ranked) – Bob Ross, The Tampa Tribune

== Music ==
Elmer Bernstein originally wrote the underscore, but his music was thrown out, and David Newman was called in at such a late stage that posters with Bernstein's name on the credits were already displayed. With only two weeks to rescore the film, Newman - who usually orchestrates the bulk of his scores himself - used a small army of orchestrators to help him complete the score: Scott Smalley, Chris Boardman, William Kidd, Peter Tomashek, Steven Bramson, Christopher Klatman, Don Davis, Joel Rosenbaum, Arthur Kempel (misspelt "Kempl" in the end credits), Mark McKenzie, Brad Warnaar (misspelt "Warner" in the end credits), and John Neufeld. The soundtrack album was released by Varèse Sarabande, including a cover version of the Smokey Robinson song "You've Really Got a Hold on Me"; only Smalley and Boardman received orchestrator credit on the album (but Ross received an acknowledgement - as does Alan Silvestri, who was also attached to the project).

1. Here's Peter (5:09)
2. Here's Sabrina (1:54)
3. Calling All Boggs (1:15)
4. Honeymoon Night (4:55)
5. Two Scoop Snoops (3:39)
6. Everybody Buys the Globe (:46)
7. Scoop de Jour (3:15)
8. Sabrina's Hip (1:04)
9. Wild Goose Chase (1:16)
10. The Beekman Agreement (2:02)
11. Keyhole Foreplay (1:20)
12. Happily Ever After (2:21)
13. "I Love Trouble" (3:43)
14. You've Really Got a Hold on Me - Robbyn Kirmsse (3:37)
