= Hallie Meyers-Shyer =

American actress and filmmaker (born 1987)

- Born: July 26, 1987 (age 38); Los Angeles, California, U.S.
- Education: Crossroads School; The New School
- Occupations: Actress; filmmaker
- Years active: 1991–present
- Parents: Charles Shyer; Nancy Meyers
- Relatives: Melville Shyer (grandfather)

Hallie Meyers-Shyer (born July 26, 1987) is an American actress and filmmaker. The daughter of filmmakers Charles Shyer and Nancy Meyers, she had small roles in several of her parents' films. She made her filmmaking debut in 2017 as the writer and director of the romantic comedy film Home Again. Her second film as writer and director, Goodrich, was released in 2024.

== Early life ==
Meyers-Shyer was born in Los Angeles, California, the daughter of filmmakers Nancy Meyers and Charles Shyer. She has an older sister, Annie. Meyers-Shyer is Jewish. She attended Crossroads School and later enrolled at the University of Southern California to study screenwriting, but transferred to The New School, where she graduated with a degree in literature.

== Career ==
Meyers-Shyer began her career appearing in small roles in six of her parents' films: Father of the Bride (1991), I Love Trouble (1994), Father of the Bride Part II (1995), The Parent Trap (1998), What Women Want (2000), and The Affair of the Necklace (2001). The lead characters in The Parent Trap were named after Meyers-Shyer and her sister, Annie Meyers-Shyer.

In 2012, it was announced that Meyers-Shyer's script The Chelsea would be made into a film starring Felicity Jones and directed by Nancy Meyers. In 2017, Meyers said her daughter's project ran into casting problems, and Meyers-Shyer "just moved on from it."

In 2017, she made her filmmaking debut as the writer and director of the romantic comedy film Home Again. The film starred Reese Witherspoon as a 40-year-old single mother who allows three young aspiring filmmakers (Pico Alexander, Nat Wolff, and Jon Rudnitsky) to live with her in her Los Angeles home. Candice Bergen and Michael Sheen also appeared in the film. It was released on September 8, 2017, by Open Road Films, and grossed $37 million worldwide.

On October 8, 2024, her second film as writer and director, Goodrich, starring Michael Keaton, was released in theaters by Ketchup Entertainment.

== Filmography ==
Year	Title	Director	Writer	Notes
2017	Home Again	Yes	Yes	
2024	Goodrich	Yes	Yes	

=== Acting roles ===
Year	Title	Role	Notes
1991	Father of the Bride	Flower Girl	
1994	I Love Trouble	Little Girl in Barn	
1995	Father of the Bride Part II	Annie Banks (Age 7)	
1998	The Parent Trap	Lindsay	
2000	What Women Want	Girl at Lunch Counter	
2001	The Affair of the Necklace	Demonstrating Girl	
