= Goodrich (film) =

2024 film by Hallie Meyers-Shyer

- Theatrical release poster
- Directed by: Hallie Meyers-Shyer
- Written by: Hallie Meyers-Shyer
- Produced by: Daniela Taplin Lundberg; Kevin Mann; Dave Caplan
- Starring: Michael Keaton; Mila Kunis; Carmen Ejogo; Michael Urie; Kevin Pollak; Vivien Lyra Blair; Nico Hiraga; Danny Deferrari; Laura Benanti; Andie MacDowell
- Cinematography: Jamie D. Ramsay
- Edited by: Lisa Zeno Churgin
- Music by: Christopher Willis
- Production companies: C2 Motion Picture Group; Stay Gold Features
- Distributed by: Ketchup Entertainment
- Release dates: October 8, 2024 (AMC The Grove 14); October 18, 2024 (United States)
- Running time: 111 minutes
- Country: United States
- Language: English
- Box office: $1.8 million

Goodrich is a 2024 American comedy drama film written and directed by Hallie Meyers-Shyer. The film stars Michael Keaton, Mila Kunis, Carmen Ejogo, Michael Urie, Kevin Pollak, Vivien Lyra Blair, Jacob Kopera, Nico Hiraga, Danny Deferrari with Laura Benanti and Andie MacDowell.

Andy Goodrich's wife upends his life upon unexpectedly checking into a rehab program, leaving him alone with their school-aged twins. Leaning on Grace, his adult daughter from another marriage, he finally evolves into an attentive father.

The film premiered in Los Angeles on October 8, 2024, and was released on October 18, 2024 in the United States by Ketchup Entertainment.

== Plot ==
Andy Goodrich is a 60-year-old Los Angeles art dealer who hardly sees his family, and his boutique gallery is starting to fail. One night, he Is awakened by a phone call from his young wife Naomi, who informs him that she has entered a 90-day rehab program for prescription pill addiction. Furious that Andy had not even noticed she was having issues with substance abuse, she informs him that she is leaving him and asks that he not contact her. He drives to the rehab facility anyway, where he Is turned away.

Without Naomi around, Andy is shown to be out of his depth with his nine-year-old twins Billie and Mose, missing school dropoff and arriving late the following day. He lies to them and says that Naomi is staying with her mother in St. Louis, but the kids quickly hear from their classmates that she is in rehab. Andy befriends their classmate Alex’s single father Terry, a part-time actor who is still struggling with his own husband leaving him three years earlier.

Andy has a tense relationship with Grace, his 36-year-old daughter from his first marriage, since he was also always at work when she was growing up and she was primarily raised by her mother Ann. Andy asks her for help with watching her younger siblings and they begin to speak more regularly. Grace is pregnant with her first child with her husband Pete, an otolaryngologist, whom Andy does not think is good enough for his daughter.

Andy’s accountant informs him and his business partner Cy that their artists are not bringing in enough revenue to offset high rents and labor costs. He sets out to secure the art from the estate of Teresa Thompson, a recently deceased painter, through her daughter Lola.

Andy continues trying to balance parenting Billie and Mose, repairing his relationship with Grace, and saving his business with a deal with Lola over the next couple of months. His ex-wife Ann and Grace both recognize that he looks like he is in a healthier place.

After Lola agrees with Andy to sell her mother’s art, he begins preparing the gallery for the exhibit. However, she suddenly backs out, forcing him to close his gallery, having run out of options. Andy throws a farewell party, and he and Grace reflect on what is next for him: traveling; parenting; and becoming a grandfather. He agrees to take her to her next doctor’s appointment while her mother is out of town and Pete is working.

On Christmas Eve, Naomi suddenly appears home and announces she is feeling better but still wants to move forward with the divorce. This visit makes him forget to pick up Grace for her appointment, so she shows up at the doctor’s office in an Uber instead. She unloads decades of fury at Andy: his absence during her childhood; his unreliability; and her jealousy that he has only recently matured, and her younger siblings get that version of him.

The atmosphere quickly changes, however, when Grace's water breaks, a few weeks earlier than expected. Andy rushes Grace to the hospital and stays with her until Pete shows up. She has a brief scare where the baby’s heart rate is abnormal, so she might need an emergency Caesarean section. Luckily Pete calms her down, so she is able to deliver normally. Andy watches tearfully, knowing his grandchild will have a wonderful father.

Grace delivers a healthy baby girl, and Andy holds her, while Billie and Mose, the new baby's aunt and uncle, respectively, look on.

== Cast ==
- Michael Keaton as Andy Goodrich, an art dealer
- Mila Kunis as Grace Goodrich, Andy's daughter from his first marriage
- Carmen Ejogo as Lola
- Michael Urie as Terry
- Kevin Pollak as Cy, Andy's business partner
- Laura Benanti as Naomi Parsons Goodrich, Andy's second wife
- Andie MacDowell as Ann Goodrich, Andy's former wife
- Vivien Lyra Blair as Billie Goodrich, Andy & Naomi's daughter and Mose's fraternal twin sister
- Nico Hiraga as Jonny
- Jacob Kopera as Mose Goodrich, Andy & Naomi's son and Billie's fraternal twin brother
- Danny Deferrari as Pete, Grace's husband
- Poorna Jagannathan as Dr. Verma
- Andrew Leeds as Greg

== Production ==
In May 2019, it was announced that a comedy film entitled Goodrich was in development with Hallie Meyers-Shyer writing and directing, and Amy Pascal serving as a producer. Michael Keaton was cast in the lead role as Andy Goodrich.

In March 2023, Mila Kunis joined the cast as Andy's older daughter Grace Goodrich. Pascal transitioned to an executive producer role.

In April 2023, Andie MacDowell, Carmen Ejogo, and Kevin Pollak were added to the cast. That same month, Michael Urie, Laura Benanti, Danny Deferrari, and Poorna Jagannathan also joined the cast.

In May 2023, Vivien Lyra Blair was cast as Andy's younger daughter Billie.

In April 2023, principal photography began in Los Angeles.

In January 2024, Ketchup Entertainment paid to acquire the film and committed to a wide theatrical release.

== Release ==
Goodrich premiered at the AMC The Grove 14 theater in Los Angeles on October 8, 2024. It was released in theaters in the United States on October 18.

== Reception ==
=== Critical response ===
On the review aggregator website Rotten Tomatoes, 82% of 61 critics' reviews are positive, with an average rating of 6.3/10.

Metacritic, which uses a weighted average, assigned the film a score of 62 out of 100, based on 12 critics, indicating "generally favorable" reviews.

Robert Daniels of RogerEbert.com gave the film three out of four stars: "Goodrich is the type of rewatchable adult-minded comedy that feels like a welcome sight."

=== Box office ===
Goodrich made $1,333,431 domestically and $516,023 in other territories for a worldwide total of $1,849,454.
