= Nancy Meyers =

American filmmaker (born 1949)

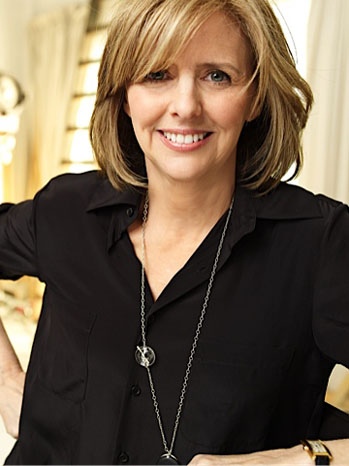
- Meyers in 2013
- Born: Nancy Jane Meyers; December 8, 1949 (age 76); Philadelphia, Pennsylvania, U.S.
- Education: American University
- Occupation: Film
- Years active: 1972–present
- Spouse: Charles Shyer (m. 1980; div. 1999)
- Children: 2; including Hallie Meyers-Shyer

Nancy Jane Meyers (born December 8, 1949) is an American filmmaker. She has written, produced, and directed many critically and commercially successful films. She was nominated for the Academy Award for Best Original Screenplay for Private Benjamin (1980). Her film Baby Boom (1987) was nominated for the Golden Globe Award for Best Motion Picture - Musical or Comedy. She co-wrote Father of the Bride (1991), Father of the Bride Part II (1995), and both wrote and directed The Parent Trap (1998), What Women Want (2000), Something's Gotta Give (2003), The Holiday (2006), It's Complicated (2009), and The Intern (2015).

Meyers was married to filmmaker Charles Shyer, with whom she had two children, including filmmaker Hallie Meyers-Shyer.

== Early life ==
Meyers was born in Philadelphia. Her father, Irving Meyers, was an executive at a voting-machines manufacturer. Her mother, Patricia Meyers (née Lemisch), was an interior designer who also worked as a volunteer with the Head Start Program and the Home for the Blind. The younger of two daughters, Meyers was raised in a Jewish household in the Drexel Hill area.

After reading playwright Moss Hart's autobiography Act One at the age of twelve, Meyers became interested in theater and started to act in local stage productions. Her interest in screenwriting did not emerge until she saw Mike Nichols' film The Graduate in 1967. Meyers attended Lower Merion High School in Lower Merion Township, Pennsylvania. In 1970, Meyers graduated from American University with a degree in journalism.

== Career ==
After graduating from college, Meyers spent a year working in public television in Philadelphia. When she was 22 years old, Meyers moved to Los Angeles, living with her sister, Sally, in the Coldwater Canyon area. She quickly got a job as a production assistant on the CBS game show The Price Is Right.

Inspired by the popular TV show, The Mary Tyler Moore Show, Meyers decided she wanted to write. She eventually got work as a story editor where she read scripts, wrote coverage, and worked with screenwriters on projects that the producers were developing. One of the companies she worked at was producer Ray Stark's company, Rastar. She worked her way up from there to writing her own scripts. Two years after coming to Los Angeles, Meyers was able to quit her job to focus on a career in screenwriting and took film-making classes where she connected with directors such as Martin Scorsese. To support herself, she started a small cheesecake business after positive reactions to a cake she made for a dinner party. Meyers was eventually hired as a story editor by film producer Ray Stark, who later fired her after Meyers objected to having two writers working on the same script without the other knowing.

=== 1980s ===
In the late 1970s, Meyers started work with Charles Shyer when she was a story editor in the film division at Motown. The pair became friends and, along with Harvey Miller, created the script for the comedy Private Benjamin (1980) together, a film about a spoiled young woman who joins the U.S. Army after her husband dies on their wedding night during sex. The film starred actress Goldie Hawn, who along with Meyers and Shyer executive produced the project. It was Hawn's agent who made Warner Brothers executive Robert Shapiro buy the script after practically "everybody [had] turned it down. Everybody. More than once," according to Meyers. Meyers described how hard it was to get the film made, noting, "Every single studio in Hollywood read it and passed on it... One studio called Goldie and said 'if you make this movie it's a career ender.'” Contrary to the conventional wisdom at the time, that a female lead with no male star was box-office poison, Private Benjamin became one of the biggest box-office hits of the year 1980, grossing nearly $70 million in total. It was nominated for an Academy Award for Best Writing, as were Hawn and her co-star, Eileen Brennan, for their performances, and won the team a Writers Guild of America Award for Best Original Screenplay. In addition, the film spawned a same-titled short-lived but Golden Globe-winning television series that aired from 1981 until 1983.

Meyers and Shyer's next project, Irreconcilable Differences (1984), marked Shyer's directorial debut. Shelley Long and Ryan O'Neal star as a Hollywood couple whose obsession with success destroys their relationship with their daughter, played by eight-year-old Drew Barrymore. Released to a mixed reception by critics, the collaboration became a moderate box office success with a gross of $12.4 million, but received multiple Golden Globe nominations, including Best Actress nods for Long and Barrymore. Also in 1984, Meyers, Shyer and Miller penned Protocol, another comedy starring Goldie Hawn, in which she portrayed a cocktail waitress who prevents the assassination of a visiting Arab Emir, and thus is offered a job with the United States Department of State as a protocol official. Hawn reportedly disliked their screenplay and hired Buck Henry for a major overhaul, prompting the trio to go into arbitration to settle their differences. While neither Meyers nor Shyer became involved in producing or directing the film, it fared slightly better at the box office than Irreconcilable Differences, garnering $26.3 million in total.

Meyers returned to producing with Baby Boom (1987), a film about a New York City female executive, who out of the blue becomes the guardian of her distant cousin's 14-month-old daughter. The film marked her debut collaboration with Diane Keaton. The catalyst for the project was a series of situations that Meyers and Shyer and their friends had experienced while managing a life with a successful career and a growing family. Baby Boom was favorably received by critics and audiences alike. It was nominated for a Golden Globe Award for Best Motion Picture - Musical or Comedy and earned a respectable $1.6 million in its opening weekend in the US, and approximately $26.7 million in its entire run. As with Private Benjamin the film was followed by a short-lived television series, this one starring Kate Jackson.

=== 1990s ===
In 1990, Meyers and Shyer, working from earlier material for the first time, re-teamed with Keaton to remake the 1950 Vincente Minnelli film Father of the Bride. Starring Steve Martin as a father losing his daughter and his bank account at the same time, their 1991 version was released to generally positive reception. It became a hit among audiences, resulting in the pair's biggest financial success yet at a worldwide gross of $90 million. A sequel to the film was made which centered around the expansion of the family, entitled Father of the Bride Part II, was produced in 1995. Loosely based on the original's 1951 sequel Father's Little Dividend, it largely reprised the success of its predecessor at the box office. A third installment, also penned by Meyers and Shyer, failed to materialize.

Also in 1991, Meyers contributed to the script for the ensemble comedy Once Upon a Crime (1992), directed by Eugene Levy, and became one out of several script doctors consulted to work on the Whoopi Goldberg comedy Sister Act (1992). Her next project with Shyer was I Love Trouble (1994), a comedy thriller about a cub reporter and a seasoned columnist who go after the same story, that was inspired by screwball comedies of the 1930s and 1940s such as His Girl Friday and Woman of the Year. Written for and starring Julia Roberts and Nick Nolte, the film was not well received by critics but grossed over $30 million in box-office receipts in the United States. While the script for Toast of the Town, another Meyers/Shyer collaboration, that Meyers described as "a Depression-era comedy about a small-town girl who comes to the big city, loses her values and then finds them again," found no buyers, another project called Love Crazy failed to materialize after lead actor Hugh Grant dropped out of the project after months of negotiations.

Having turned down Paramount CEO Sherry Lansing's offer to direct the 1996 comedy blockbuster The First Wives Club, Meyers eventually agreed on making her directorial debut with The Parent Trap (1998), following the signing of a development deal with Walt Disney Pictures in 1997. A remake of the same-titled 1961 original based on Erich Kästner's novel Lottie and Lisa, it starred Lindsay Lohan in her motion picture debut, in a dual role of estranged twin sisters who try to reunite their long-divorced parents, played by Dennis Quaid and Natasha Richardson. Lohan's casting as twins forced Meyers to shoot the film in motion control, a requirement she considered rather complicated. "I really didn't know how to do it," she said. "We had a prep day to go over the process, and by the end of the day I had a little better understanding. But I approached the movie like it wasn't an effects film; I just tried to make it authentic." Released to positive reviews from critics, The Parent Trap brought in $92 million worldwide.

=== 2000s ===
In 1998, following the success of The Parent Trap and her separation from Shyer, Disney's Touchstone Pictures chairman Joe Roth asked Meyers to reconstruct an original script named Head Games about a man who gains the power to hear everything women are thinking, an idea originally conceived by The King of Queens producers Cathy Yuspa and Josh Goldsmith. Subsequently, Meyers penned two drafts of the script before agreeing to direct, but as Roth left the studio in January 2000, Disney dismissed the film and the project eventually went to Paramount. By the following year, Mel Gibson and Helen Hunt had signed on to star in leading roles and the project had been retitled What Women Want. Released in 2000 to mixed reviews, it became the then-most successful film ever directed by a woman, taking in $183 million in the United States, and grossing upward of $370 million worldwide.

Following her divorce, Meyers wrote and directed the post-divorce comedy Something's Gotta Give (2003), starring Diane Keaton and Jack Nicholson as a successful 60-something and 50-something, who find love for each other at a different time of life, despite being complete opposites. Nicholson and Keaton, aged 66 and 57 respectively, were seen as bold casting choices for leads in a romantic comedy, and 20th Century Fox, the film's original distributor, reportedly declined to produce the film, fearing that the lead characters were too old to be bankable. As a result, the film ended up as a co-production between Columbia Pictures and Warner Bros. Pictures. While critical reaction to the film as a whole was more measured, Something's Gotta Give received generally favorable notice and became a surprise box-office hit following its North American release, eventually grossing US$266.6 million worldwide, mostly from its international run. In 2005, her Waverly Films production company signed a deal with Sony.

Meyer's next film was The Holiday (2006), a romantic comedy starring Cameron Diaz and Kate Winslet as two lovelorn women from opposite sides of the Atlantic Ocean who arrange a home exchange to escape heartbreak during the Christmas and holiday season. Jude Law and Jack Black co-starred as their love interests. Released to mixed reviews from critics, the film became a global box office success, grossing $205 million worldwide, mostly from its international run. The film won the 2007 Teen Choice Award in the Chick Flick category.

In 2009, Meyers's It's Complicated was released. It starred Meryl Streep as a successful bakery owner and single mother of three who starts a secret affair with her ex-husband, played by Alec Baldwin, ten years after their divorce – only to find herself drawn to another man: her architect Adam (portrayed by Steve Martin). The film was met with mixed reviews from critics, who declared it rather predictable despite fine work by an appealing cast, but became another commercial hit for Meyers upon its Christmas Day opening release in the United States. It played well through the holidays and into January 2010, ultimately closing on April 1 with $112.7 million. Worldwide, It's Complicated eventually grossed $219.1 million, and surpassed The Holiday to become Meyer's third highest-grossing project to date. It's Complicated earned Meyers two Golden Globe nominations, including Best Motion Picture – Musical or Comedy and Best Screenplay.

=== 2010s ===
In 2012, it was announced that Meyers was planning to direct The Chelsea, an ensemble dramedy set in the Chelsea Apartments in New York. Based on a screenplay by daughter Hallie Meyers-Shyer, it was set to star Felicity Jones; the project failed to materialize however as Meyers was also finishing her own screenplay for The Intern (2015), a comedy about the founder of a fashion based e-commerce company who agrees to a community outreach program where seniors will intern at the firm. Originally set up at Paramount Pictures, the latter was expected to feature Tina Fey and Michael Caine in the lead roles. When a budget could not be settled, Meyers decided to pre-package before going out to other studios and was able to start negotiations for both actors. Handed over to Warner Bros, Fey was replaced by Reese Witherspoon as the attached star, though Witherspoon later left the film due to scheduling conflicts. In 2014, Anne Hathaway and Robert De Niro replaced Witherspoon and Caine.

In September 2015, Meyers announced that her next self-directed project would see her reteaming with Steve Martin. She also served as a producer on Home Again (2017), the directorial debut of her daughter Hallie Meyers-Shyer, starring Reese Witherspoon.

=== 2020s ===
In September 2020, Nancy Meyers announced a follow-up to the first two Father of the Bride films was coming. The first teaser trailer was released on September 23, with an official preview released the following day. The "mini-sequel" was written and directed by Meyers, with the plot including a family reunion over Zoom at the request of Matty Banks, and depicted George Banks' reaction to 2020. Steve Martin, Diane Keaton, Kimberly Williams-Paisley, Kieran Culkin, George Newbern, and Martin Short reprised their respective roles, with Alexandra Shipp and Robert De Niro joining. The film will benefit World Central Kitchen charity, supporting families and children who suffered during the coronavirus pandemic. Father of the Bride Part 3(ish) was released on September 25, 2020, exclusively through Netflix, while also streaming on the service's YouTube and Facebook pages.

In April 2022, Netflix announced Meyers would write, direct and produce a new feature film for the streaming service, an untitled ensemble comedy. In March 2023, it was reported that the film, under the working title Paris Paramount, would not move forward at Netflix after the studio had declined to approve a requested production budget of $150 million; a few days later, Warner Bros. Pictures entered talks to acquire the project, with the possibility that the film could have begun production that summer if picked up.

== Directorial style and influences ==
Meyers attributes her major influences to the screwball comedies of the 1930s and 1940s. Her films frequently center the experiences of middle-aged women facing conflict between the personal and the professional. Meyers's films are known to redirect the male gaze and instead take a critical view of male leads through the female gaze.

Meyers generally spends a year writing, followed by six months of filming and another six months of editing. She has final cut privilege on her films, which is uncommon for directors working with major American studios. Meyers is known as a detail-oriented director, who shoots many takes of scenes and is meticulously involved in designing her films' aesthetic details. Meyers considers her film set to function as a character in her films.

Meyers's protagonists are often affluent and live in luxurious homes, which she says is meant to emphasize that they are successful women who can afford to create beautiful, comfortable spaces for themselves. The extravagant design and decoration of the kitchens in her films have received particular media attention. The decor style seen in Meyers's films have been dubbed the "Nancy Meyers aesthetic", defined by neutral paint colors, natural wood furniture, patterned textiles, and vintage accessories.

== Reception ==
The academic and writer Deborah Jermyn has dubbed Nancy Meyers "Hollywood's reigning 'romcom queen.'" Scholarship and criticism of Meyers's oeuvre has discussed the postfeminist aesthetics and ideologies that her films embody, in which wealthy, successful, and independent women often play the protagonists. In a 2020 article for Bustle, Dana Schwartz writes in praise of this, saying, "Where Hollywood desexualizes and disposes of women over 40, Nancy Meyers celebrates them, showing them as women who have crushed their careers and become financially stable enough to buy objectively stunning pieces of property". Film scholar Michele Schreiber argues that the fantasy of romance itself becomes a "fulfilling and desirable commodity", but says there is a question of whether the power of her films derives from the emotional terrain and romances of her characters, or from her seductive, pleasurable mise-en-scène and the upwardly mobile desires it generates. Cultural critic Kelly Marie Coyne observes that her films often "star women over 50, a group long rendered invisible in rom-coms", showing that the love lives of older women can be "exciting" and "desirable".

In a 2009 New York Times profile of Meyers, writer Daphne Merkin points out that her films sometimes have the quality of "tidy unreality," which is the aspect of her filmmaking that often draws harsh criticism. Some criticism has taken note of how the "independent woman" figure in Nancy Meyers film always appears as heterosexual, upper-class, and white, leveling charges of white feminism on her work.

Katarzyna Paszkiewicz asserts that Meyers's ability to simultaneously carve out a particular, feminized niche in her work, while still providing mainstream (and even male) audiences with "what they want," has made her the most successful commercial female filmmaker. Paszkiewicz contends that Meyers's reliance on the rom-com genre may be more complex and self-reflexive than it appears. In The Intern (2015), for example, many traditional rom-com tropes are recast and reimagined by making the focal relationship, between Jules and Ben, a non-romantic, intergenerational one. The film also highlights disenchantment with the "independent woman" ideal, and foregrounds the problems that plague professional women in heteronormative relationships. Thus, against contemporary charges that the rom-com genre is tired and overdone, Meyers has the ability to use the genre’s tropes in a regenerative, original manner. In Paszkiewicz's words, "If postfeminist values marked the decades of the 1990s and 2000s, Meyers seems to ask: what is next?"

== Influence on industry ==
Meyers has had a significant impact on the filmmaking industry as a female filmmaker, gaining her the reputation as one of the most influential women filmmakers in the romantic-comedy genre and in the Hollywood industry. This is due to her recognizable directorial style with notable sets and the limited number of female directors in the space. She is one of only 36 female filmmakers to be on Disney+ out of their catalogue of over 500 films going back to the 1930s.

Meyers's overall popularity in the romantic-comedy genre has allowed her work to become cited many times as a filmmaker important to audience nostalgia.

In her later works, her depictions of older women on screen created more popularity within the genre. In addition to her popularity with audiences, Meyers has been said to have left an impact on the actors she has worked with. Reese Witherspoon even identifies Meyers as a resource in Witherspoon’s own creative endeavors.

== Personal life ==
In 1980, Meyers and Charles Shyer married in Rome. They had been in a relationship since 1976. The pair separated in 1999 and eventually divorced. They have two daughters, Annie Meyers-Shyer and Hallie Meyers-Shyer, both of whom have had minor roles in their films. On February 28, 2020, Meyers published her post-divorce story as part of the New York Times column called "Modern Love".

Meyers resides in the Brentwood neighborhood of Los Angeles.

== Filmography ==
=== Film ===
Year	Title	Credited as			Notes
Year	Title	Director	Writer	Producer	Notes
1980	Private Benjamin	No	Yes	Yes	
1984	Irreconcilable Differences	No	Yes	Executive	
1984	Protocol	No	Yes	No	
1986	Jumpin' Jack Flash	No	Yes	No	Credited as Patricia Irving
1987	Baby Boom	No	Yes	Yes	
1991	Father of the Bride	No	Yes	Yes	
1992	Once Upon a Crime	No	Yes	No	
1994	I Love Trouble	No	Yes	Yes	
1995	Father of the Bride Part II	No	Yes	Yes	
1998	The Parent Trap	Yes	Yes	No	Feature directorial debut
2000	What Women Want	Yes	No	Yes	
2003	Something's Gotta Give	Yes	Yes	Yes	
2006	The Holiday	Yes	Yes	Yes	
2009	It's Complicated	Yes	Yes	Yes	
2015	The Intern	Yes	Yes	Yes	
2017	Home Again	No	No	Yes	
2020	Father of the Bride, Part 3(ish)	Yes	Yes	No	Short film
2027	Paris Paramount	Yes	Yes	Yes	Filming

=== Television ===
Year	Title	Credited as		Notes
Year	Title	Executive Producer	Writer	Notes
1981	Private Benjamin	No	No	Based on characters by Meyers
1988	Baby Boom	Yes	Yes	Creator; 13 episodes

=== Reception ===
Title	Rotten Tomatoes	Metacritic
Private Benjamin (1980)	82%	59%
Irreconcilable Differences (1984)	57%	52%
Protocol (1984)	25%	55%
Jumpin' Jack Flash (1986)	29%	52%
Baby Boom (1987)	75%	53%
Father of the Bride (1991)	70%	51%
Once Upon a Crime (1992)	0%	35%
I Love Trouble (1994)	22%	N/A
Father of the Bride Part II (1995)	48%	49%
The Parent Trap (1998)	86%	63%
What Women Want (2000)	54%	47%
Something's Gotta Give (2003)	72%	66%
The Holiday (2006)	49%	52%
It's Complicated (2009)	58%	57%
The Intern (2015)	60%	51%
Home Again (2017)	32%	41%

== Awards and nominations ==
Year	Association	Category	Work	Result	Ref.
1981	Writers Guild of America Award	Best Original Screenplay	Private Benjamin	Won	
1981	Academy Award	Best Writing (Screenplay Written Directly for the Screen)	Private Benjamin	Nominated	
1987	Golden Globe Award	Best Motion Picture – Musical or Comedy	Baby Boom	Nominated	
1999	Youth in Film Award	Best Family Feature – Comedy	The Parent Trap	Nominated	
2001	Saturn Award	Best Fantasy Film	What Women Want	Nominated	
2010	Critics' Choice Award	Best Comedy	It's Complicated	Nominated	
2010	Golden Globe Award	Best Motion Picture – Musical or Comedy	It's Complicated	Nominated	
2010	Golden Globe Award	Best Screenplay	It's Complicated	Nominated	
2010	Satellite Award	Best Film – Musical or Comedy	It's Complicated	Nominated	
2016	Teen Choice Award	Choice Movie – Comedy	The Intern	Nominated	
