= Jane Elliot =

American actress (born 1947)

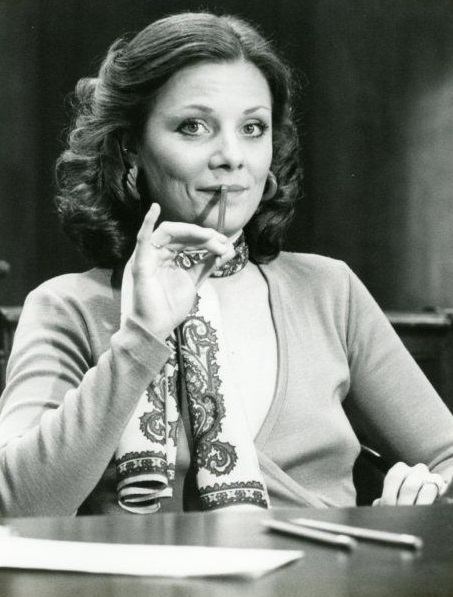
- Elliot on Rosetti and Ryan in 1977
- Born: January 17, 1947 (age 79); New York City, U.S.
- Occupation: Actress
- Years active: 1960–present

Jane Elliot (born January 17, 1947) is an American actress, best known for her role as Tracy Quartermaine in the ABC daytime soap opera General Hospital.

== Early years ==
The daughter of an attorney, Elliot was born in New York City. Her family name is Stein; she chose "Elliot" as her stage name because she had a friend who had that name. She began taking ballet classes when she was 4 years old, and at 14 she began taking classes in singing.

== Career ==
When Elliot was 17 and in London on a Summer Abroad program, she won a "major role" in a production of Come Back, Little Sheba on British television. That experience gained her a membership in British Equity and led to a role in "a lucrative TV soap".

Elliot appeared in a number of episodic prime time television series, such as The Mod Squad, Kojak, Barnaby Jones and Police Woman. She had a lead role in the short-lived NBC series Rosetti and Ryan in 1977.

Elliot also made film appearances, including Change of Habit (1969); opposite Elvis Presley, Mary Tyler Moore, and Barbara McNair; and One Is a Lonely Number (1972). In 1987, Elliot appeared in the films Some Kind of Wonderful and Baby Boom.

=== Daytime roles ===
Elliot made her daytime debut in the short-lived ABC soap A Flame in the Wind in 1965. She is best known for her role as Tracy Quartermaine on the ABC daytime soap opera General Hospital. Elliot debuted as Tracy in 1978 and became a fan favorite. Her first stint included a scene which underscored Tracy's ruthlessness, where Tracy withholds her father's heart medication when he appears to be suffering a heart attack. Elliot left in 1980 and won a Daytime Emmy Award for Outstanding Supporting Actress in a Drama Series for the role in 1981. The same year, she landed the recurring role of Judy Trent on the prime time CBS series Knots Landing.

From 1981 to 1982, Elliot appeared on the CBS soap opera Guiding Light as Carrie Todd, a character who was involved with Ross Marler; Ross learns that Carrie is a murderer and has a split personality. Elliot considers her time as Carrie as one of her favorite roles, saying "the most was asked of me when I was doing that role."

From 1984 to 1986 she played Cynthia Chandler Preston Cortlandt on All My Children. Cynthia seduced wealthy, older Palmer Cortlandt, broke up Palmer and Daisy's marriage and married Palmer, while sleeping with Ross Chandler.

In 1986 producer Gail Kobe contacted Elliot, to offer her the role of Stephanie Douglas Forrester on the newly created CBS soap opera The Bold and the Beautiful. Elliot accepted the role, but on Christmas Eve 1986, Kobe called Elliot to tell her that Susan Flannery was returning to daytime as Stephanie, and creator Bill Bell had given Flannery the part instead.

Elliot next appeared on daytime as Anjelica Deveraux on Days of Our Lives from 1987 to 1989. Although married to Harper Deveraux (played by Joseph Campanella), Anjelica has an affair with the much younger Justin Kiriakis (played by Wally Kurth), and becomes pregnant with his child. Complications ensue when Anjelica discovers that Harper is sterile, and has always known about it. Elliot played the part of Anjelica for two years, with the character being involved in many additional complications and intrigues.

After leaving Days of Our Lives, she returned to General Hospital in 1989, and in 1991 was reunited with Kurth, who was cast as Tracy's son, Ned Ashton. Elliot left again in mid-1993, later becoming a producer on the 1995 ABC soap opera The City. From 1996 to 1997 she reprised the role of Tracy Quartermaine on The City after briefly appearing as Tracy again on General Hospital. In 2003, Elliot returned to General Hospital as a regular cast member. In 2014, she was nominated for another Daytime Emmy Award for Outstanding Supporting Actress in a Drama Series, 33 years after her win and 21 years since her last nomination. Elliot announced her retirement in March 2017.

In November 2019, it was announced that she would be returning to General Hospital in December 2019. She has made several short-term appearances since; the character of Tracy's appearances were generally written as holiday visits until Elliot’s full-time return in 2023. She now describes herself as a “failed retiree.”

=== Theater ===
On Broadway Elliot portrayed Linda Kingsley in The Impossible Years (1965), a role that resulted from her performance in the Bucks County Playhouse's production of Hay Fever.

== Filmography ==
=== Film ===
Year	Title	Role	Notes
1960	World War III Breaks Out	Tomoko (US release—voice only)	Feature film In the US this film was released under the title "The Final War"
1969	Change of Habit	Sister Barbara	Feature film
1969	Dr. Heidegger's Experiment	Widow Wycherlyl	Short film
1972	One Is a Lonely Number	Madge Frazier	Feature film
1987	Some Kind of Wonderful	Carol Nelson	Feature film
1987	Baby Boom	Park Mom	Feature film

=== Television ===
Year	Title	Role	Notes
1965	The Doctors and the Nurses	Miss Marks	Episode: "Night of the Witch"
1965	ITV Play of the Week	Marie	Episode: "Come Back Little Sheba"
1965	A Flame in the Wind	Linda Skerba	Series regular
1967	N.Y.P.D.	Jilly	Episode: "The Pink Gumdrop"
1968	Judd for the Defense	Jo Ann Storm	Episode: "Kingdom of the Blind"
1968	The Guns of Will Sonnett	Netta	Episode: "Where There's Hope"
1968	The Mod Squad	Daphne	Episode: "The Guru"
1969	CBS Playhouse	Rita	Episode: "Shadow Game"
1970	Dan August	Pleasance	Episode: "The King Is Dead"
1970	The Bold Ones: The Lawyers	Grave Young	Episode: "Trial of a PFC"
1970	The Interns	Louella	Episode: "Act of God"
1972	Welcome Home, Johnny Bristol	Sister Theresa	Television film (CBS)
1973	The Fabulous Doctor Fable	June Fable	Television pilot film (ABC)
1974	Kojak	Carla Elliot	Episode: "Therapy in Dynamite"
1975	Barnaby Jones	Ann Danvers	Episode: "Fantasy of Fear"
1975	Police Woman	Trudy Franklin / Jana Hummel	Episode: "Ice"
1976	Widow	Judy	Television film (NBC)
1976	Once an Eagle	Cheryl Logan	Television 7-part miniseries (NBC); Episode: "Chapter 2"
1976	Electra Woman and Dyna Girl	Princess Cleopatra	Episode: "The Pharaoh: Part 1"; Episode: "The Pharaoh: Part 2"; Episode: "Return of the Pharaoh: Part 1"; Episode: "Return of the Pharaoh: Part 2" These episodes were also aired as part of the umbrella series titled The Krofft Supershow along with two other series, Dr. Shrinker and Wonderbug, in the same year.
1977	Panic in Echo Park	Ebony	Television pilot film (NBC)
1977	In the Matter of Karen Ann Quinlan	Maria Armstrong	Television film (NBC)
1977	Rosetti and Ryan	Jessica Hornesby	Main role, 7 episodes
1978–1980, 1989–1993, 1996, 2003–2017, 2019–2021, 2023–present	General Hospital	Tracy Quartermaine Williams Ashton Hornsby Soleito Zacchara Spencer	Series regular Daytime Emmy Award for Outstanding Supporting Actress in a Drama Series (1981); Soap Opera Digest Award for Outstanding Supporting Actress: Daytime (1992); Nominated — Daytime Emmy Award for Outstanding Supporting Actress in a Drama Series (1993, 2014); Nominated — Soap Opera Digest Award for Outstanding Supporting Actress (1993); Nominated — Soap Opera Digest Award for Outstanding Villainess (2005)
1980	Dan August: The Jealousy Factor	Plesance	Television film (ABC) ABC created this television film by combining two episodes (Murder by Proxy and The King is Dead) of the original 1970-1971 Dan August television series. Jane originally appeared in the episode "The King is Dead".
1980–1981	Knots Landing	Judy Trent	Episode: "Remember the Good Times" (1980; credited as Jane Elliott); Episode: "Breach of Faith" (1981); Episode: "Choices" (1981)
1981–1982	Guiding Light	Carrie Todd Marler	Series regular
1982	CBS Children's Mystery Theatre	Margaret "Maggie" Brenner	Episode: "The Zertigo Diamond Caper"
1982	A New Day in Eden	Madge Sinclair	Episode: #1.1
1984–1986	All My Children	Cynthia Chandler Preston Cortlandt (17 episodes)	Series regular Nominated — Soap Opera Digest Award for Outstanding Villainess in a Daytime Serial (1986)
1987–1989	Days of Our Lives	Anjelica Curtis Deveraux #1 (192 episodes)	Series regular Soap Opera Digest Award for Outstanding Villainess: Daytime (1990); Nominated — Daytime Emmy Award for Outstanding Supporting Actress in a Drama Series (1989); Nominated — Soap Opera Digest Award for Outstanding Villainess: Daytime (1991)
1988	Baby Boom	Julie	Episode: "Pilot"; Episode: "The Right School for Elizabeth" Jane also appeared in the 1987 feature film Baby Boom which the television series was based upon.
1996–1997	The City	Tracy Quartermaine Williams Ashton Hornsby Soleito Zacchara Spencer	Series regular (84 episodes)
1998–2001	Law & Order	Randi Smolin	Episode: "Castoff" (1998)
1998–2001	Law & Order	State Attorney General Isabel Shore	Episode: "Ego" (2001)
2015	Mrs. Gary	Eva Pressington	Episode: "Yard Sale"

== Awards and nominations ==
Year	Award	Category	Nominated work	Result
1981	8th Daytime Emmy Awards	Outstanding Supporting Actress in a Drama Series	General Hospital	Won
1986	Soap Opera Digest Awards	Outstanding Villain on a Daytime Serial	All My Children	Nominated
1989	16th Daytime Emmy Awards	Outstanding Supporting Actress in a Drama Series	Days of Our Lives	Nominated
1990	Soap Opera Digest Awards	Outstanding Villainess: Daytime	Days of Our Lives	Won
1991	Soap Opera Digest Awards	Outstanding Villainess: Daytime	Days of Our Lives	Nominated
1992	Soap Opera Digest Awards	Outstanding Supporting Actress: Daytime	General Hospital	Won
1993	Soap Opera Digest Awards	Outstanding Supporting Actress	General Hospital	Nominated
1993	20th Daytime Emmy Awards	Outstanding Supporting Actress in a Drama Series	General Hospital	Nominated
2004	Gold Derby Awards	Supporting Actress - Daytime Drama	General Hospital	Won
2005	Soap Opera Digest Awards	Favorite Villainess	General Hospital	Nominated
2009	Gold Derby Awards	Daytime Supporting Actress of the Decade	General Hospital	Nominated
2013	Gold Derby Awards	Supporting Actress - Daytime Drama	General Hospital	Nominated
2014	41st Daytime Emmy Awards	Outstanding Supporting Actress in a Drama Series	General Hospital	Nominated
