= November 1963 (film) =

Upcoming film by Roland Joffé

- Theatrical release poster
- Directed by: Roland Joffé
- Written by: Nicholas Celozzi
- Produced by: Kevin DeWalt; Nicholas Celozzi
- Starring: John Travolta; Robert Carlyle; Dermot Mulroney; Jefferson White; Mandy Patinkin
- Music by: Jason Hill
- Production companies: Minds Eye Entertainment; Le Monde Productions
- Distributed by: Ketchup Entertainment
- Release dates: November 25, 2026 (Turin Film Festival); December 4, 2026
- Countries: United States; Canada
- Language: English

November 1963 is an upcoming biographical historical crime drama film directed by Roland Joffé about the assassination of John F. Kennedy, and alleged involvement of the Chicago Outfit. It stars John Travolta, Robert Carlyle, Dermot Mulroney, Jefferson White, and Mandy Patinkin. The film is scheduled to be released on December 4, 2026. The film will be presented at the 44th edition of the Turin Film Festival.

== Cast ==
- John Travolta as Johnny Roselli
- Robert Carlyle as Jack Ruby
- Dermot Mulroney as Charles Nicoletti
- Jefferson White as Lee Harvey Oswald
- Mandy Patinkin as Anthony Accardo
- Thomas Fiscella as Sam Giancana

== Production ==
=== Development ===
The film was announced on May 8, 2024, with Roland Joffé attached to direct from a screenplay by Nicholas Celozzi, nephew of Chicago Outfit boss Sam Giancana. Celozzi stated, "My family, my cousins, really got tired of people using our name, monetizing our name and telling a fake story." According to Celozzi, he got the story of the film when he was a child from Giancana's brother, Joseph "Pepe" Giancana, Celozzi's uncle.

=== Casting ===
John Travolta, Mandy Patinkin, and Dermot Mulroney were announced as cast members on February 7, 2025. Robert Carlyle and Jefferson White were announced as cast members on April 7, 2025.

=== Filming ===
Principal photography took place in Winnipeg in July 2025. Dealey Plaza, the site of the assassination of John F. Kennedy, was reconstructed at Birds Hill Provincial Park in southern Manitoba. The film utilized 1,500 extras and over 75 period cars to portray the time period.

== Release ==
K5 International owns the international sales rights to the film. Ketchup Entertainment acquired the North American distribution rights to the film in May 2026 and will theatrically release it on December 4, 2026. It was originally scheduled to be released on November 20.

== See also ==
- Executive Action, a 1973 film that presents the assassination of John F. Kennedy from a conspiracy point of view.
- JFK, a 1991 film by Oliver Stone that depicts a conspiracy to kill Kennedy.
- Ruby, a 1992 film centering around Jack Ruby that depicts a conspiracy to kill Kennedy.
- Assassination of John F. Kennedy in popular culture
