= Home Again (2017 film) =

- Theatrical release poster
- Directed by: Hallie Meyers-Shyer
- Written by: Hallie Meyers-Shyer
- Produced by: Erika Olde; Nancy Meyers
- Starring: Reese Witherspoon; Nat Wolff; Jon Rudnitsky; Pico Alexander; Lake Bell; Reid Scott; Lola Flanery; Dolly Wells; Michael Sheen; Candice Bergen; Jen Kirkman
- Cinematography: Dean Cundey
- Edited by: David Bilow
- Music by: John Debney
- Production companies: Black Bicycle Entertainment; Waverly Films
- Distributed by: Open Road Films
- Release dates: August 29, 2017 (Los Angeles); September 8, 2017 (United States)
- Running time: 97 minutes
- Country: United States
- Language: English
- Budget: $15 million
- Box office: $37.3 million

Home Again is a 2017 American romantic comedy film written and directed by Hallie Meyers-Shyer. It stars Reese Witherspoon, Nat Wolff, Jon Rudnitsky, Pico Alexander, Michael Sheen, and Candice Bergen.

The plot follows a 40-year-old single mother who allows three young aspiring filmmakers to live with her in her Los Angeles home, after meeting them while out celebrating her birthday.

The film was released on September 8, 2017 by Open Road Films, grossed $37 million worldwide and received mixed reviews from critics.

== Plot ==
Alice Kinney is the daughter of film director John Kinney, who made several prominent personal-focused films in his life but died some years ago. As she hits her 40th birthday, she is currently separated from her husband Austen, who has stayed in New York in his role as a music producer. Alice has moved back into her father's Los Angeles home with her daughters, Isabel and Rosie, to be closer to her mother, Lillian. She is also attempting to start her own interior design business.

While out for a drink with her friends, Alice encounters Harry, George, and Teddy, three aspiring filmmakers. They have come to LA to make a pitch to possible producers, after a short film they presented at a film festival received positive acclaim. Despite the three being in their late twenties, they hit it off with Alice and her friends, with Alice nearly sleeping with Harry before he passes out from intoxication.

The next morning, George discovers a room containing John Kinney's old scripts and awards and realizes Alice's family history just as Lillian, Isabel, and Rosie return from the girls' night with their grandmother. Alice takes the girls to school while Lillian offers the young men breakfast. She is so won over by their compliments of John's old films that she offers them the guest house while they make their pitch.

As the three stay in the house, they all become an important part of Alice's routine, as she develops a potential romantic interest in Harry while Teddy helps her set up a website for her business. George encourages Isabel to enter a script-writing contest at school as part of an effort to pursue her own literary aspirations, with Isabel coming to rely on George for emotional support to deal with anxiety issues when it comes to her writing.

The three young men also meet with Justin Miller, a director potentially interested in funding their project, despite his past work focusing on horror movies. As Alice and Harry grow closer, she invites him to join her for dinner with a couple of her friends. He has a meeting with Miller about further funding opportunities that runs over, prompting Alice to call off their potential romantic relationship the following morning.

Alice is depressed when she realises her first potential client has basically been treating her more like general hired help without taking any of her design suggestions seriously. She is further thrown when Austen unexpectedly arrives in Los Angeles, claiming that he is uncomfortable about having three strangers living with his family. When Harry learns that Teddy and George have been pursuing independent projects, he becomes bitter at the belief that they have no faith in his own work, prompting him to leave the house.

Teddy's dislike of Austen's subtle manipulations culminates in a fistfight between them just as Alice returns from picking up her daughters from school. Although Alice agrees with Austen that it may be time for the others to move out, she informs him that she wants an official divorce. George and Teddy reconcile with Harry and find their own apartment, with Harry accepting the others' decision to pursue other opportunities on top of their joint work.

A week later, Alice visits the boys' new apartment to apologise for how things turned out, assuring them that she still wants them to be a part of her family. Harry apologises to Alice, declaring that she is too good for him. On the day of Isabel's school play, the three men have a meeting with a potential investor in their project.

When the meeting overruns and the client expresses ideas that are not in line with their vision of the film, Harry cuts it short so that they can get to the play, just making it in time for the start. George's presence backstage reassures a nervous Isabel, while he is also implied to hit it off with her teacher. That evening, the strange 'family' has a dinner to celebrate Isabel's success, with young Rosie commenting on the actor who played her dad. Everyone looks at her, dumbfounded. She shrugs and asks, "What? Was it not about us?!"

== Cast ==
- Reese Witherspoon as Alice Kinney, Austen's wife and Isabel and Rosie's mother, recently separated from her husband and trying to start an interior design business
- Nat Wolff as Teddy Dorsey, Harry's younger brother, one of three aspiring filmmakers Alice meets on her 40th birthday, and the lead actor in the trio's film
- Jon Rudnitsky as George Appleton, a perceptive scriptwriter who forms a bond with Isabel
- Pico Alexander as Harry Dorsey, Alice's love interest, Teddy's older brother and the director of the trio's short film
- Lake Bell as Zoey Bell, a client of Alice's nascent interior design business
- Reid Scott as Justin Miller, a film director interested in making the trio's short into a feature
- Dolly Wells as Tracy, Alice's best friend
- Lola Flanery as Isabel Blume-Kinney, Austen and Alice's elder daughter and Rosie's older sister, who experiences anxiety about her new school
- Eden Grace Redfield as Rosie Blume-Kinney, Austen and Alice's younger daughter and Isabel's younger sister
- P.J. Byrne as Paul, an agency rep.
- Josh Stamberg as Warren, a producer
- Michael Sheen as Austen Blume, Alice's estranged New-York-based record producer husband and Isabel and Rosie's father
- Candice Bergen as Lillian Stewart, Alice's mother and a former actress.

== Production ==
In May 2016, it was announced Rose Byrne had been cast in the film, with Hallie Meyers-Shyer writing and directing. Her mother, Nancy Meyers, and Erika Olde served as producers. In August 2016, it was announced Reese Witherspoon had been set to star in the film, replacing Byrne. In October 2016, Candice Bergen, Michael Sheen and Reid Scott joined the cast, and in November 2016, Jon Rudnitsky, Lake Bell, Nat Wolff, and Pico Alexander joined as well.

=== Filming ===
Principal photography began in October 2016 in Los Angeles and lasted until December 7, 2016.

== Release ==
In September 2016, Open Road Films acquired distribution rights to the film. It was released in the United States on September 8, 2017.

=== Home media ===
Home Again was released on Digital HD on November 21, 2017, and on DVD and Blu-ray by Universal Pictures Home Entertainment on December 12, 2017.

== Reception ==
=== Box office ===
Home Again grossed $27 million in the United States and Canada, and $10.3 million in other territories, for a worldwide total of $37.3 million, against a production budget of $12 million.

In North America, Home Again was released alongside It, and was projected to gross $10–12 million from 2,940 theaters in its opening weekend. It made $300,000 from Thursday night previews and $3.1 million on its first day. It went on to debut at $8.6 million, finishing second at the box office, behind It ($123.4 million). In its second weekend, the film dropped 38% to $5.3 million, finishing fourth, behind It and newcomers American Assassin and Mother!.

=== Critical response ===
On review aggregator Rotten Tomatoes, the film has an approval rating of 33% based on 138 reviews, with an average rating of 4.8/10. The website's critical consensus reads, "Home Again gathers a talented crowd of rom-com veterans on both sides of the camera—all of whom have unfortunately done far better work." On Metacritic, which assigns a normalized average rating to reviews, the film has a weighted average score of 41 out of 100, based on 29 critics, indicating "mixed or average" reviews. Audiences polled by CinemaScore gave the film an average grade of "B" on an A+ to F scale.

Jon Frosch of The Hollywood Reporter called the film "a female-driven comedy so thoroughly sanitized that it's essentially wiped of personality." Rolling Stone's Peter Travers gave it 1.5/4 stars, writing, "Witherspoon is a genuine fireball of a star, and it takes a lot to muffle her high spirits in a blanket of bland. So congratulations, Home Again. Against all odds, you've done it." Ed Potton of The Times gave it 2/5 stars, writing, "Yes, Witherspoon is as loveable as ever, but she can do this kind of thing in her sleep. Indeed, she must have felt close to it at times during this forgettable sigh of a movie."

Katie Walsh of the Los Angeles Times was more positive. She gave the film 3/4 stars, writing, "This world doesn't quite exist, but it's an exceedingly pleasant place to escape to for a couple of hours. Meyers-Shyer may have gotten it from her mama, but the point of view is all hers." The Guardian's Peter Bradshaw gave it 3/5 stars, calling it "very silly but very watchable; you'd have to be very puritan to take exception."
