= Jakaranda =

Pop group active from 1997 to 1998

- Genres: Pop, dance, dance-pop
- Years active: 1997-1998
- Labels: Sony Music Entertainment Japan, Crave
- Past members: Jacqueline "Jackie" Siebert; Kenny Wong; Allison DiNonno; Ronnie Davidson

Jakaranda was a pop group consisting of Kenny Wong, Allison DiNonno, and Jacqueline "Jackie" Siebert which performed from 1997 to 1998. In the summer of 1998 Kenny Wong was replaced by Ronnie Davidson. The group was a part of Crave Records, a subsidiary of Sony Music Entertainment (Japan), which ceased operations in 1998. The group had moderate attention upon the release of the Disney remake The Parent Trap, where their single "Never Let You Go" was featured. A similar version of "Never Let You Go" was made by Dario G, an English dance music group in 1997 titled "Sunchyme". It reached No. 2 in the UK singles chart in 1997. The original theme for both these songs was taken from the 1985 song "Life in a Northern Town" by The Dream Academy.

One album was produced before Crave was shut down and the group split thereafter.

== Discography ==
- 1997/1998: Everynight, Everyday (Maxi-Single)
- 1998: Just Like That (Single)
- 1998: Never Let You Go (Maxi-Single)
- 1998: Never Let You Go (Album)
