= Ketchup Entertainment =

American independent film production and distribution company

- Type: Private
- Industry: Film industry
- Founded: 2011; 15 years ago
- Founder: Gareth West, Artur Galstian, Vahan Yepremeyan
- Headquarters: Los Angeles, California, U.S.
- Area served: Worldwide
- Key people: Gareth West (CEO)
- Number of employees: 12
- Website: ketchupentertainment.com

Ketchup Entertainment is an American independent film production and distribution company. The company is best known for distributing Hypnotic (2023), Memory (2023), Hellboy: The Crooked Man, Goodrich (all in 2024), The Day the Earth Blew Up: A Looney Tunes Movie and Christmas Karma (both in 2025), Rolling Loud: The Movie, November 1963, and Coyote vs. Acme (all in 2026).

== History ==
In May 2012, Ketchup Entertainment launched its distribution division, partnering with ARC Entertainment. It was founded by Gareth West alongside Armenian-American partners Vahan Yepremyan and Artur Galstian. In May 2013, Ketchup entered an agreement with Open Road Films to distribute their films across home entertainment and non-theatrical platforms.

In 2023, the company distributed Hypnotic directed by Robert Rodriguez, starring Ben Affleck, and Memory starring Jessica Chastain and Peter Sarsgaard. The company also produced Ferrari directed by Michael Mann, and distributed by Neon.

In September 2023, Ketchup Entertainment secured the distribution rights to Hellboy: The Crooked Man.

In August 2024, Ketchup Entertainment secured the North American distribution rights to The Day the Earth Blew Up: A Looney Tunes Movie. In March 2025, the company acquired the worldwide distribution rights to another Looney Tunes film, Coyote vs. Acme, which had been unreleased since 2023. The film had its theatrical release on August 28, 2026.

== Films ==
Films distributed and/or produced by Ketchup Entertainment.

=== Released ===
Title	Year	Notes
The Dragon Pearl	2011	
Lost Christmas	2011	
Picture Day	2012	
Whole Lotta Sole	2012	Released in North America as Stand Off.
The Frozen	2012	
Kill Me Now	2012	
Mafia	2012	
Linsanity	2013	
Big Sur	2013	
Vehicle 19	2013	
Aroused	2013	
Savannah	2013	
Harlock: Space Pirate	2013	
The Love Punch	2013	
The Starving Games	2013	
Are You Joking?	2014	Also known as You Must Be Joking!
Wolves	2014	
Big Game	2014	co-production with EuropaCorp, Subzero Film Entertainment, Altitude Film Entertainment, Egoli Tossell Film GmbH, VisionPlus Fund I, Film House Germany, Head Gear Films, Metrol Technolog, Waterstone, and Bavaria Film Partners
Captain Sabertooth and the Treasure of Lama Rama	2014	
Debug	2014	
Superfast!	2015	
A Royal Night Out	2015	
Compulsion	2016	
Bushwick	2017	
Captain Sabertooth and the Magic Diamond	2019	
Dr. Bird's Advice for Sad Poets	2021	
Hypnotic	2023	co-distribution with Relativity Media
Ferrari	2023	co-production with Moto Pictures, Forward Pass, Storyteller Productions, STXfilms, Esme Grace Media, Rocket Science, Cecchi Gori USA, Iervolino & Lady Bacardi Entertainment, Bliss Media, and Le Grisbi Productions
Memory	2023	North American distribution only
Hellboy: The Crooked Man	2024	United States distribution only
Goodrich	2024	
Weekend in Taipei	2024	North American distribution only
The Day the Earth Blew Up: A Looney Tunes Movie	2024	North American distribution only, produced by Warner Bros. Animation
Christmas Karma	2025	North American distribution only
Coyote vs. Acme	2026	Produced by Warner Animation Group, (Note: Warner Bros. Pictures Animation used the Warner Animation Group logo as the film completed production before the studio changed to its current name. It is jokingly listed as a wholly owned subsidiary of the Acme Corporation.) Troll Court Entertainment and Keylight Pictures, US co-distribution with Warner Bros. Pictures (Note: Warner Bros. Pictures receives studio credit, and is the copyright holder and the co-distributor of the film.)
Rolling Loud: The Movie	2026	North American distribution only, produced by Live Nation Studios & American High

=== Upcoming ===
Title	Year	Notes
November 1963	2026	North American distribution only, produced by Minds Eye Entertainment
Ozi: Voice of the Forest	TBA	North American distribution only, produced by Appian Way Productions and GCI Film
ViQueens	TBA	North American distribution only, produced by Zwart Arbeid, Space Age Films, OPCM, Gimpville AS, Vamonos Films, Rumba AS and Sola Media
