= Best of My Love =

Best of My Love or The Best of My Love may refer to:

== Albums ==
- Best of My Love (album), by Samantha Jade, 2018
- The Best of My Love, by Coco Lee, 2000

== Songs ==
- "Best of My Love" (Eagles song), 1975
- "Best of My Love" (The Emotions song), 1977
- "Best of My Love" (Javine song), 2004
