= Bruce A. Block =

American film producer

Bruce A. Block (born November 1, 1966) is a film producer, author and visual consultant whose career spans over 30 years. In 2001, Block's book The Visual Story was published. In 2007 it went into a completely revised second edition. In 2020 a revised third edition was published by Routledge Press, an imprint of Taylor & Francis.

Block began work as a director of commercials, corporate films, and visual effects at Graphic Films Corporation in Hollywood, California. He became a film and visual consultant on such films as Irreconcilable Differences (1984) and Bachelor Party (1984). He has gone on to be a consultant for films such as Stuart Little (1999), As Good as It Gets (1997) and Spanglish (2004). As a film producer, Block has produced and co-produced the films Father of the Bride (1991), Father of the Bride II (1995), Disney's The Parent Trap (1998), What Women Want (2000), Something's Gotta Give (2003), and The Holiday (2006).

In 2007, Block was featured in an on-camera interview, discussing visual style, for the 40th Anniversary DVD release of the film The Graduate. Block's audio commentary as a film historian is also featured in the 2008 Collector's Edition DVD of the classic 1960 film The Apartment.

Block is a graduate of Carnegie-Mellon University with a degree in theatre directing. Block also received an MFA from USC's School of Cinematic Arts. He is now a tenured professor at USC teaching classes in production and visual structure. Block holds the Sergei Eisenstein Endowded Chair in Cinematic Design.
