= Charles Shyer =

American director, screenwriter and producer (1941–2024)

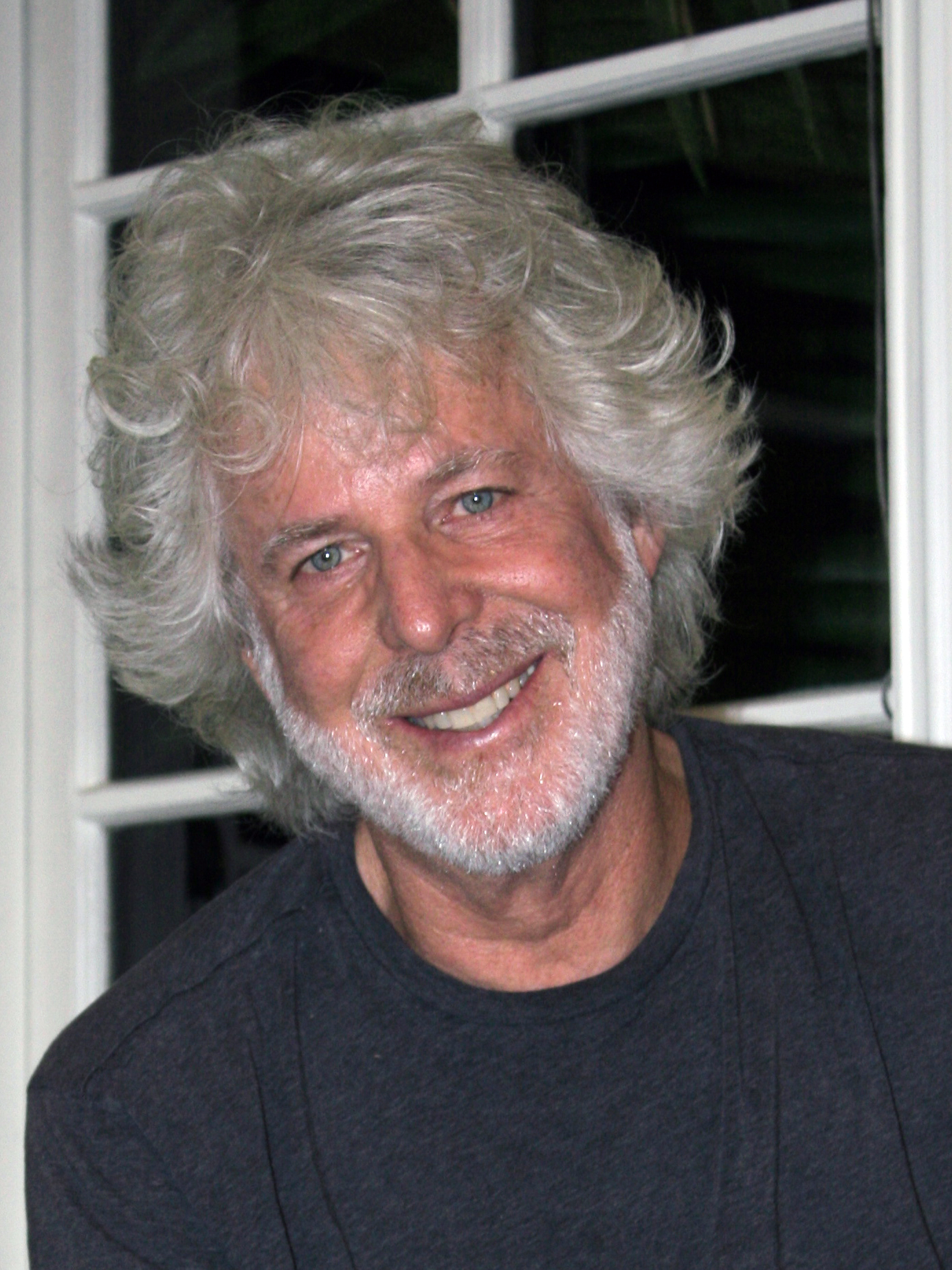
- Shyer in 2011
- Born: Charles Richard Shyer; October 11, 1941; Los Angeles, California, U.S.
- Died: December 27, 2024 (aged 83); Los Angeles, California, U.S.
- Occupations: Film director, screenwriter, producer
- Years active: 1966–2024
- Spouses: Diana Ewing (m. 1969; div. 1974) Nancy Meyers (m. 1980; div. 1999) Deborah Lynn (m. 2004; div. 2009)
- Children: 4; including Hallie Meyers-Shyer
- Father: Melville Shyer

Charles Richard Shyer (October 11, 1941 – December 27, 2024) was an American filmmaker. Shyer's films are mainly comedies, often with a romcom overtone. His writing-directing credits include Private Benjamin (1980), Irreconcilable Differences (1984), Baby Boom (1987), Father of the Bride (1991), The Parent Trap (1998), The Affair of the Necklace (2001), and Alfie (2004).

== Early life ==
Shyer was born in Los Angeles, the son of Lois (née Jones) Delaney and Melville Shyer, a production executive and film director. His father worked with D.W. Griffith and was one of the founders of the Directors Guild of America. After attending UCLA, Shyer was accepted into the DGA's apprenticeship program, which led to work as an assistant director. However, Shyer's focus was soon diverted to writing and he went to work as an assistant to Garry Marshall and Jerry Belson, producers of the TV series The Odd Couple. He eventually worked his way up to head writer and associate producer on the popular series in the early 1970s. He was of Jewish descent.

== Career ==
After The Odd Couple, Shyer moved to feature films and received his first writing credit on Smokey and the Bandit (1977). The following year, Shyer co-wrote Goin' South, directed by and starring Jack Nicholson, and received his first Writers Guild of America nomination for Best Screenplay for the film House Calls (1978).

In 1979, Shyer teamed with Nancy Meyers and Harvey Miller to write and produce Private Benjamin, starring Goldie Hawn in the role of Private Judy Benjamin. Receiving positive reviews from critics and ranking number one at the box office its opening weekend, Private Benjamin grossed nearly $70 million within the U.S. and over $100 million worldwide. The screenplay for Private Benjamin won Shyer, Meyers, and Miller the Writers Guild of America Award for Best Original Comedy and was nominated for an Academy Award in the Best Original Screenplay category. The film was also nominated for multiple Golden Globe Awards, including Best Picture and Best Actress.

Shyer's Irreconcilable Differences marked his directorial debut. Shelley Long and Ryan O'Neal played a Hollywood couple whose obsession with success destroys their relationship with their daughter, played by an eight-year-old Drew Barrymore. Critics praised the film's even-handed treatment of both main characters and its sensitive updating of 1930s comedy style. Irreconcilable Differences received Golden Globe nominations for Long and Barrymore.

Shyer's 1987 film Baby Boom, like Private Benjamin, dealt with the role of women in a changing, feminist-influenced world, in the form of a romantic comedy. Diane Keaton played J.C. Wiatt, a high-powered executive who unexpectedly finds herself saddled with a baby. The film was nominated for a Golden Globe Award as Best Motion Picture – Musical or Comedy, and Keaton was nominated as Best Actress – Motion Picture Musical or Comedy.

In 1991, Meyers and Shyer, working from earlier material for the first time, remade the 1950 Vincente Minnelli Father of the Bride with Shyer directing. Father of the Bride received positive reviews from critics, including Janet Maslin's writing “Father of the Bride has been successfully refurbished with new jokes and new attitudes, but the earlier film's most memorable moments have been preserved." Steve Martin won acclaim for his performance of a father "losing" his daughter and his bank account at the same time. Diane Keaton, Kimberly Williams, and Martin Short were singled out for praise for their performancess. Meyers and Shyer then wrote, produced, and directed Father of the Bride Part II. As Touchstone Pictures' major attraction for the 1995 Christmas season, Father of the Bride, Part II opened number one at the box office and grossed over $75 million within the U.S.

Shyer co-wrote and produced the Meyers-directed remake of The Parent Trap (1998), grossing over $65 million in the U.S.

Shyer's period drama The Affair of the Necklace (L'Affaire du Collier) starred Hilary Swank.

In 2004, Shyer wrote, directed and produced a remake of the 1966 film Alfie. Alfie starred Jude Law, Susan Sarandon and Sienna Miller in her first major role.

In 2012, jewelry designer Liv Ballard premiered the online fashion film Ieri Oggi Domani (Yesterday, Today and Tomorrow), written and directed by Shyer in his first commercial endeavor. The fashion film has since won multiple awards, including two from the Internet Advertising Competition: "Best Fashion Online Advertisement" and "Best of Show 2012."

In 2022, Shyer wrote and directed The Noel Diary, starring Justin Hartley.

In 2023, Shyer co-wrote and produced Best. Christmas. Ever!.

== Death ==
Shyer died at Cedars-Sinai Medical Center in Los Angeles on December 27, 2024, at the age of 83.

== Films ==
Year	Film	Credit(s)	Notes
1977	Smokey and the Bandit	writer	Nominated – Golden Globe Award for Best Actress in a Motion Picture - Musical or Comedy; Nominated – Academy Award for Best Film Editing; Won – People's Choice Award
1978	House Calls	writer	Nominated – WGA Award for Best Original Screenplay
1978	Goin' South	writer	Nominated – Golden Globe Award for Best Motion Picture Acting Debut
1980	Private Benjamin	writer and producer	Won – WGA Award for Best Original Screenplay; Nominated – Academy Award for Best Original Screenplay; Nominated – Academy Award for Best Actress; Nominated – Academy Award for Best Supporting Actress; Nominated – Golden Globe Award for Best Actress in a Motion Picture - Musical or Comedy
1984	Irreconcilable Differences	writer and director	Nominated – Golden Globe Award for Best Actress in a Motion Picture - Musical or Comedy; Nominated – Golden Globe Award for Best Supporting Actress - Film
1984	Protocol	writer	
1986	Jumpin' Jack Flash	writer (as J.W. Melville)	
1987	Baby Boom	cowriter and director	Nominated – Golden Globe Award for Best Motion Picture - Musical or Comedy
1991	Father of the Bride	cowriter and director	Won – BMI Film Music Award to Alan Silvestri (1993)
1992	Once Upon a Crime	writer	
1994	I Love Trouble	writer and director	
1995	Father of the Bride Part II	writer and director	Nominated – Golden Globe Award for Best Actor in a Motion Picture - Musical or Comedy
1998	The Parent Trap	writer and producer	Nominated – Young Artist Award for Best Family Feature – Comedy
2001	The Affair of the Necklace	Director & Producer	Nominated – Academy Award for Best Costume Design
2004	Alfie	writer, director, and producer	Won – Golden Globe Award for Best Original Song; Won – Critic's Choice Award for Best Song; Nominated – Empire Award for Best Newcomer
2012	Ieri Oggi Domani (Yesterday, Today and Tomorrow)	writer and director	Won – Internet Advertising Competition 2012 for Best Online Fashion or Beauty Film; Won – Internet Advertising Competition 2012 for Best in Show; Won – Best Shorts Competition Award; Won – The Telly Award; Won – The Accolade Competition Award; Won – Academy of Visual Arts Communicator Award
2022	The Noel Diary	writer and director	
2023	Best. Christmas. Ever!	cowriter and producer	
