= Irreconcilable Differences =

1984 film by Charles Shyer

- Theatrical release poster
- Directed by: Charles Shyer
- Written by: Nancy Meyers; Charles Shyer
- Produced by: Richard Hashimoto; Nancy Meyers; Arlene Sellers; Alex Winitsky
- Starring: Ryan O'Neal; Shelley Long; Drew Barrymore; Sam Wanamaker; Allen Garfield; Sharon Stone
- Cinematography: William A. Fraker
- Edited by: John F. Burnett
- Music by: Paul de Senneville; Olivier Toussaint
- Distributed by: Warner Bros.
- Release date: September 28, 1984
- Running time: 114 minutes
- Country: United States
- Language: English
- Budget: $6-10 million
- Box office: $12 million

Irreconcilable Differences is a 1984 American comedy-drama film starring Ryan O'Neal, Shelley Long, and Drew Barrymore. It is loosely inspired on the marriage and divorce of filmmakers Peter Bogdanovich and Polly Platt.

The film was released on September 28, 1984, received mixed reviews from critics, and grossed $12 million. For their performances, both Long and Barrymore were nominated for Golden Globe Awards.

== Plot ==
Casey Brodsky has decided to divorce her parents and have her nanny, Maria Hernandez, appointed as Casey's legal guardian. It results in media attention, and her parents, Albert and Lucy Brodsky, are both brought out of their respective self-absorbed lives and made to testify in court about their personal lives.

At a truck stop in Indiana on the night of January 20, 1973, film professor Albert Brodsky is hitchhiking across the country, where he gets picked up by Lucy van Patten, a woman who has ambitions of writing books, particularly for children, but her fiancé "Bink", a gruff Navy man, represses her, and she is depressed about being relegated to the life of a military wife. Through getting to know Albert, Lucy loosens her inhibitions, breaks off her engagement to Bink, and marries Albert shortly afterwards.

The couple move to California, where Albert attaches himself to a prominent Hollywood producer, who entrusts him to film a romantic script the producer has kept shelved for a long time. When Albert suffers from writer's block about the romance, Lucy aids him with her writing skills. The film becomes a box-office hit and he is nominated for the Academy Award for Best Director, but cracks are forming in Albert and Lucy's marriage, particularly since Albert was slow to credit Lucy for the screenplay and he is frequently traveling to places such as Cannes, France, while leaving his daughter in the care of Lucy, or more often Maria, their Mexican maid. Casey is becoming more fluent in Spanish as a result of spending more time with Maria than her own parents. When Albert sees a young woman named Blake Chandler working at a hot dog stand, he takes her home and casts her in his next film, which becomes a moderate success. When Lucy sees signs that Albert is interested in Blake for more than just acting, she divorces him, further troubling Casey. Albert ensures that Lucy gets custody of Casey, while he lives in a Hollywood mansion with Blake.

A turning point occurs when Lucy, angered both at Albert's procrastination in paying child support and at the sight of a sloppy, overweight woman in a supermarket buying the same comfort food as she is, hurries home and channels her anger into writing a tell-all novel. Meanwhile, Albert's producers are warning him not to attempt his musical remake of Gone with the Wind, which he is calling Atlanta, but Albert ignores their advice, and his budget for the picture skyrockets, mainly because of his own perfectionist attitude and Blake's mediocre singing voice, along with her diva-like behavior on set. Atlanta becomes an embarrassing box-office bomb, costing Albert any assignments in Hollywood and causing Blake to desert him. Meanwhile, Lucy's novel becomes a runaway success, allowing her to buy and move into Albert's former mansion, and she begins to morph into a diva.

In a final confrontation following a one-night stand, Albert and Lucy quarrel in front of Casey about her custody, which degenerates into a literal tug of war, with each parent pulling on one of Casey's arms, ignoring her pained protests. That is the final straw for Casey, who then decides to divorce both her parents.

In the courtroom, Casey gives testimony that just because two parents no longer love each other, that does not give them the right to ignore their children. Both Albert and Lucy break down in tears. Maria is given legal custody of Casey.

Months later Casey is still living with Maria and her family. Albert seems to be doing better now, getting modest but regular work directing TV commercials and sitcoms, and is being considered to direct a B movie, and Lucy has returned to her more down-to-earth personality. Both Lucy and Albert arrive at Maria's house for visitation with Casey at the same time by mistake, and the three of them decide to go out and eat together at a family restaurant, suggesting now a more peaceful, though decidedly bittersweet, relationship exists among them.

== Cast ==
- Ryan O'Neal as Albert Brodsky
- Shelley Long as Lucy Van Patten Brodsky
- Drew Barrymore as Casey Brodsky
  - Jessica Christensen as infant Casey Brodsky
- Sam Wanamaker as David Kessler
- Allen Garfield as Phil Hanner
- Sharon Stone as Blake Chandler
- Beverlee Reed as Dotty Chandler
- Hortensia Colorado as Maria Hernandez
- David Graf as Bink

== Production ==
Irreconcilable Differences was inspired by the divorce between director Peter Bogdanovich and his first wife, producer Polly Platt, after he left her for actress Cybill Shepherd (whose proxy in the film is played by Sharon Stone). Sam Wanamaker plays a producer based on Roger Corman. Some of Bogdanovich's early films are parodied/altered, such as Targets, The Last Picture Show, Daisy Miller, and the big-budget motion picture that broke him, the musical At Long Last Love (depicted in the film as an adaptation of Gone With The Wind).

Charles Shyer and Nancy Meyers had written and produced Private Benjamin. The success of that movie enabled Shyer to direct this one. They started working on it after Benjamin originally for Orion Pictures. They claimed much of the material was based on their own romantic relationship - when they made it they had been together for a number of years and shared a child. Charles Shyer said they were also attracted by the opportunity to tell a non-linear story. The script took fourteen drafts.

Raising finance was difficult. It took producers Arlene Sellers and Alex Winitsky nine months to raise $6 million.

"I love the movie," said Ryan O'Neal. "So I did it for no salary, just points. It was made for under $6 million, so they didn't have the money to pay us. Still, I think it's some of my best work. Maybe I should work like that more often."

== Reception ==
On the review aggregator website Rotten Tomatoes, 60% of 15 critics' reviews are positive, with an average rating of 5.7/10. Metacritic, which uses a weighted average, assigned the film a score of 52 out of 100, based on 9 critics, indicating "mixed or average" reviews.

Roger Ebert of the Chicago Sun-Times did not like the title and did not think the film was very promising at first, "The plot drifts dangerously toward a series of stagy confrontations, but avoids the obvious: This movie has been written with so much wit and imagination that even obligatory scenes have a certain freshness and style." Ebert called it "one of the funnier and more intelligent movies of 1984" and gave it 3 1/2 stars out of 4. Janet Maslin of The New York Times praised the talents of the movie's adult leads, but thought Drew Barrymore was too self-consciously cute. She said that, most of the time, the efforts of director Charles Shyer fell "terribly flat."

== Accolades ==
Award	Date of ceremony	Category	Recipients	Result	Ref.
Youth in Film Awards	December 2, 1984	Best Leading Young Actress in a Feature Film	Drew Barrymore	Nominated	
Golden Globe Awards	January 27, 1985	Best Actress in a Motion Picture – Musical or Comedy	Shelley Long	Nominated	
Golden Globe Awards	January 27, 1985	Best Supporting Actress – Motion Picture	Drew Barrymore	Nominated	

== See also ==
- List of American films of 1984
