= The Parent Trap (1998 film) =

1998 film by Nancy Meyers

- Theatrical release poster
- Directed by: Nancy Meyers
- Screenplay by: David Swift; Nancy Meyers; Charles Shyer
- Based on: Lisa and Lottie by Erich Kästner
- Produced by: Charles Shyer
- Starring: Dennis Quaid; Natasha Richardson; Lindsay Lohan
- Cinematography: Dean Cundey
- Edited by: Stephen A. Rotter
- Music by: Alan Silvestri
- Production company: Walt Disney Pictures
- Distributed by: Buena Vista Pictures Distribution
- Release date: July 29, 1998
- Running time: 128 minutes
- Country: United States
- Language: English
- Budget: $15 million
- Box office: $92.1 million

The Parent Trap is a 1998 American family romantic comedy film directed by Nancy Meyers, in her feature directorial debut, and produced by Meyers' then-husband Charles Shyer. It stars Lindsay Lohan in her film debut in a dual role of identical twins who have been separated at birth and, upon meeting by chance at summer camp, decide to work together to reunite their divorced parents, played by Dennis Quaid and Natasha Richardson. The Parent Trap is a remake of the 1961 film of the same name and an adaptation of Erich Kästner's 1949 German children's novel, Lisa and Lottie (Das doppelte Lottchen). David Swift, who wrote and directed the original 1961 film, is credited, along with Meyers and Shyer, as co-writers of the 1998 film.

Principal photography took place from July 1997 to December 1997, in both California and London, with cinematographer Dean Cundey. During post-production, editing was completed by Stephen A. Rotter, and the score was composed by Alan Silvestri. The Parent Trap utilized special effects to make Lohan's dual role seamless, with many shots requiring extensive planning and precise execution during filming and compositing in post-production.

The Parent Trap premiered in Los Angeles on July 20, 1998, before being theatrically released in the United States nine days later by Walt Disney Pictures. Its London premiere took place on November 8, 1998, as a Royal Film Performance attended by Queen Elizabeth II. The Parent Trap was distributed by Buena Vista Pictures Distribution and was a box-office hit, grossing $92.1 million worldwide against a budget of $15 million. It received positive reviews from critics, with Lohan's performance in particular earning high praise. She won the Young Artist Award for Best Performance in a Feature Film – Leading Young Actress at the 20th Youth in Film Awards in 1999, and is widely considered to have been a significant factor in the film's success, marking her breakthrough role and launching her to stardom.

== Plot ==
In 1986, American wine grower Nicholas "Nick" Parker and British wedding gown designer Elizabeth James fall in love and marry on the Queen Elizabeth 2. Shortly after Elizabeth gives birth to identical twins, Annie and Hallie, their parents divorce and become estranged, as Elizabeth returns to England with Annie while Nick gets full custody of Hallie. Annie is raised in London, and Hallie grows up on Nick's vineyard in Napa, California, neither knowing the other exists.

Nearly 12 years later, Annie and Hallie are coincidentally sent to the same summer camp in Maine. They first meet at the end of a fencing match, stunned to see that they look identical. A rivalry ensues, escalating from a poker match into a prank war, which leads the two girls to be sent to stay in the isolation cabin. Annie and Hallie begin to bond, and learn that they have the same birthday. Each has a torn photo of the parent they have never known, which they discover are halves of their parents' wedding photo.

Realizing that they are twins, Annie and Hallie hatch a plan to switch places and force their parents to reunite. Each twin trains the other to impersonate her, even cutting Annie's hair and piercing her ears, and the sisters go home in each other's place at the end of summer camp. In London, Hallie meets Elizabeth, Elizabeth's father Charles, and the family butler Martin, while Annie meets Nick and their family housekeeper Chessy in California.

Annie is dismayed to learn that Nick is engaged to Meredith Blake, a 26-year-old gold digger. Chessy realizes the truth about the twins' swap but agrees to keep the secret from Nick. Annie phones Hallie to warn her about Nick's upcoming wedding, but Hallie is caught by her grandfather, Charles. With Charles's encouragement, Hallie confesses to her mother, who is surprised but happy to have spent time with her other daughter, and agrees to travel to California to establish joint custody of the twins between both parents.

The twins arrange for Nick and Elizabeth to meet at a San Francisco hotel, where Chessy and Martin soon fall for each other. Elizabeth is secretly disappointed to learn about Nick's engagement, and Nick is so stunned to see Elizabeth that he falls into the pool. Despite the twins' deception, Nick is happy to learn that Annie has been with him since the end of camp. With Chessy and Martin's help, the twins recreate the night their parents met through a romantic dinner on a yacht. As they reminisce, Elizabeth reveals that she had secretly hoped Nick would follow her after their breakup, and both wonder what would have happened if he had.

Nick and Elizabeth decide not to resume their relationship, but agree on shared custody of the twins. Elizabeth prepares to go home with Annie, but the twins refuse to reveal which one is which unless the entire family takes a camping trip. Elizabeth later insists that Meredith go in her place to get to know the twins before becoming their stepmother. The twins play a series of pranks on Meredith, who demands that Nick choose between her and them. Finally seeing Meredith's true nature, Nick chooses his daughters and breaks off the engagement.

Elizabeth and Nick realize they are still in love, but go their separate ways. When Elizabeth and Annie return to London, they find Nick and Hallie waiting for them, having taken the Concorde. Nick declares that he does not want to make the same mistake of not running after Elizabeth again, and they kiss. Elizabeth and Nick remarry with Annie and Hallie as their bridesmaids on the Queen Elizabeth 2, where Martin proposes to Chessy.

== Cast and characters ==
- Lindsay Lohan as Hallie Parker and Annie James, 11-year-old identical twin sisters who were separated after birth. After their parents' divorce, they are raised separately with no knowledge of each other's existence until they meet at summer camp by chance. Hallie and Annie are based on Susan Evers and Sharon McKendrick from the original film, as well as Luise Palfy and Lottie Körner from the original book.
  - Erin Mackey served as Lohan's double and plays both twins in the scenes where they were together.
- Dennis Quaid as Nicholas "Nick" Parker, Hallie and Annie's father, a wealthy American vineyard owner. He is based on Mitchell "Mitch" Evers from the original film and Ludwig Palfy from the original book.
- Natasha Richardson as Elizabeth "Liz" or "Lizzie" James, Hallie and Annie's mother, a famous British wedding gown designer. She is based on Margaret "Maggie" McKendrick from the original film and Luiselotte Körner from the original book.
- Elaine Hendrix as Meredith Blake, a 26-year-old publicist from San Francisco who is only planning to marry Nick for his money. She is based on Vicky Robinson from the original film and Irene Gerlach from the original book.
- Lisa Ann Walter as Chessy, Nick's housekeeper and Hallie's nanny. She has long considered herself rather awkward and thus not overly desirable to eligible bachelors, but then she meets Martin, and the two are mutually smitten. Chessy also discovers that "Hallie" is Annie after noticing her strange behavior. Chessy is based on Verbena from the original film and Resi from the original book.
- Simon Kunz as Martin, the James family's butler, who eventually falls in love with Chessy. He is based on Staimes, the McKendrick family's chauffeur from the original film.
- Polly Holliday as Marva Kulp Sr., the owner and director of Camp Walden. She is based on Miss Inch from the original film and Mrs. Muthesius from the original book.
- Maggie Wheeler as Marva Kulp Jr., Marva Sr.'s daughter and assistant. She is based on Miss Grunecker from the original film and Miss Ulrike from the original book.
- Ronnie Stevens as Charles James, Elizabeth's wealthy father and Hallie and Annie's maternal grandfather. After he catches Hallie on the phone with Annie, she tells Charles about switching places with her. He is based on Charles McKendrick from the original film.
- Joanna Barnes as Vicky Blake, Meredith's mother. She is based on Edna Robinson from the original film. Barnes previously played Vicky Robinson in the 1961 film.
- J. Patrick McCormack as Les Blake, Meredith's father.

Kat Graham played Jackie, a friend of Annie at Camp Walden. Vendela Kirsebom appears as a model during a photoshoot sequence at Elizabeth James' studio. Hallie and Annie Meyers-Shyer—daughters of the director, Meyers, and the producer, Shyer—make appearances in the film, credited as Lindsay and Towel Girl, respectively. Lohan's brother, Michael (credited as Lost Boy at Camp), plays a boy at Camp Walden who did not realize he was going to an all-girls camp. Lohan's mother, Dina, and her siblings, Aliana and Dakota, all appear in uncredited cameos at the airport in London. The film's cinematographer, Dean Cundey, appears in an uncredited cameo as the captain of the Queen Elizabeth 2, who marries Nick and Elizabeth at the beginning of the film. Jeannette Charles portrayed Queen Elizabeth II in a deleted scene in which she and Hallie meet.

== Production ==
=== Casting ===
The Parent Trap was Nancy Meyers' directorial debut. More than 1,500 young actresses submitted audition tapes for the dual roles of Hallie and Annie. Meyers was looking for "a little Diane Keaton" to play the parts. Before Lindsay Lohan was cast in the roles, actresses Mara Wilson, Scarlett Johansson, Michelle Trachtenberg, and Jena Malone all either auditioned or were considered for the dual roles, with Malone turning the roles down multiple times, and Wilson being considered too young.

=== Filming ===
Principal photography began on July 15, 1997 in London, and continued in Napa Valley, San Francisco, Lake Arrowhead, and Los Angeles, California, until December 17, 1997. Camp Walden was filmed on location at Camp Seely in Crestline, California. Parker Knoll, the vineyard and residence of the Parker family in the film, was shot on location in Rutherford, California, at Staglin Family Vineyard. The exterior of the fictional Stafford Hotel was shot at the Administration Building, Treasure Island in San Francisco, while the interior at The Langham Huntington in Pasadena, California, and pool scenes were shot at The Ritz-Carlton in Marina del Rey, California. Director Nancy Meyers collaborated on The Parent Trap with her then-husband Charles Shyer as producer and co-writer, shortly before their divorce. The twins in the film are named after their two daughters, who both have cameo appearances, and the film is dedicated to Hallie Meyers-Shyer.

The filming process utilized motion control photography for the visual effect of Lindsay Lohan playing both roles. "It was complicated, and I really didn't know how to do it", Meyers recalled of using the technique in her directorial debut. "We had to do everything twice, and on children's hours. But the complexity of the motion control work became oddly fun. It was a fun challenge to figure it out. Since I didn't know the restrictions of what could be done and what couldn't, I would ask for things that, had I known better, I wouldn't have." Actress Erin Mackey was hired as a double for Lohan as part of the filming process.

Former Disney chief executive officer (CEO) Michael Eisner is said to have made comments to Meyers and Lohan at the time of the premiere, suggesting that two different girls played the twins.

=== Book ===
In 1962, a year after Walt Disney Pictures originally adapted Das doppelte Lottchen into The Parent Trap, Cyrus Brooks translated the German children's book into English as Lisa and Lottie, an edition still published in the United States and Canada.

A novelization of the film by Hallie Marshall was published in 1998.

In 2014, Das doppelte Lottchen was faithfully retranslated into English by Anthea Bell and republished in the United Kingdom and Australia by Pushkin Press as The Parent Trap, following Disney's successful film adaptations. Then, in 2020, Australian actress Ruby Rees recorded an unabridged narration of Bell's translation for Bolinda Publishing.

== Callbacks to the 1961 film ==
There are several connections between this film and the original 1961 film:

- The characters Marva Kulp Sr. and Marva Kulp Jr. are named after Nancy Kulp, the actress who played a camp counselor in the 1961 film, Miss Grunecker.
- The army marching song featured in the 1961 movie is the "Colonel Bogey March" - this song can be heard again in the remake when Hallie and Annie are marched to the Isolation Cabin.
- Both versions of the film feature product placement by Nabisco. In the 1998 film, Oreos are featured, while in the 1961 film, Newtons are featured.
- During the poolside scene where Annie and Meredith meet for the first time, Meredith speaks on the phone with someone named Reverend Mosby, who was a character in the 1961 film played by Leo G. Carroll.
- Joanna Barnes appears in both films, playing Vicky Robinson in the 1961 film and Vicki Blake in the 1998 version. She also calls Annie (as Hallie) "pet", which Vicky Robinson did to Sharon (as Susan).
- The Stafford Hotel is named after a boy in the 1961 film who accepts the boys' camp invitation to the dance at the beginning of the film.
- Right before meeting Meredith for the first time, Hallie can be heard singing a few bars of "Let's Get Together", a song from the 1961 version that Hayley Mills initially sang. The Walt Disney Pictures logo fanfare pays homage to the song.
- Both films have the same run time (2 hours and 9 minutes).
- Hallie (as Annie) "smells" her grandfather, upon meeting him for the first time, in both films, saying he smells of peppermint and pipe tobacco. Susan (as Sharon) does the same in the 1961 film.

== Music ==
The song used in the opening sequence, in which glimpses of Nick and Elizabeth's first wedding are seen, is Nat King Cole's "L-O-V-E". The song used in the end credits, in which photos of Nick and Elizabeth's second wedding are seen, is Natalie Cole's "This Will Be (An Everlasting Love)".

The instrumental music featured prominently in the hotel scene where the girls and their parents cross paths serendipitously is "In the Mood", which was previously made famous by the Glenn Miller band. The song "Let's Get Together" is also quoted over the Walt Disney Pictures logo, and at the end of Alan Silvestri's closing credits suite.

When Hallie shows up at Annie's poker game at Camp Walden, the music used is "Bad to the Bone" by George Thorogood and the Destroyers.

The tune playing as Hallie and Annie make their way up to the isolation cabin is the main theme from "The Great Escape" by Elmer Bernstein.

The song coming from the radio in Meredith's car as she pulls up to the Parkers' home is "Parents Just Don't Understand" by DJ Jazzy Jeff & the Fresh Prince.

The background song heard in the campfire scene is "How Bizarre" by OMC.

The song playing as Annie, Elizabeth, and Martin say goodbye to Hallie, Nick, and Chessy toward the end of the film is "Ev'ry Time We Say Goodbye", performed by Ray Charles and Betty Carter.

=== Soundtrack ===
The Parent Trap

Soundtrack album by Various artists
- Released: July 28, 1998
- Length: 54:08
- Label: Hollywood

The Parent Trap (Original Soundtrack)
No.	Title	Writer(s)	Recording artist	Length
1.	"L-O-V-E"	Bert Kaempfert; Milt Gabler	Nat King Cole	2:32
2.	"Do You Believe in Magic"	John Sebastian	The Lovin' Spoonful	2:05
3.	"There She Goes"	Lee Mavers	The La's	2:43
4.	"Top of the World"	Richard Carpenter; John Bettis	Shonen Knife	3:56
5.	"Here Comes the Sun"	George Harrison	Bob Khaleel	3:08
6.	"(I Love You) For Sentimental Reasons"	Deek Watson; William Best	Linda Ronstadt	3:44
7.	"Soulful Strut"	Eugene Record; Sonny Sanders	Young-Holt Unlimited	3:00
8.	"Never Let You Go"	Christian Berman; Frank Berman; Gabriel Gilbert; Jeff Coplan; Matthias Hass; Nick Laird-Clowes	Jakaranda	3:07
9.	"Bad to the Bone"	George Thorogood	George Thorogood & The Destroyers	4:49
10.	"The Happy Club"	Bob Geldof; Karl Wallinger	Bob Geldof	4:05
11.	"Suite from The Parent Trap"	Alan Silvestri		7:13
12.	"This Will Be (An Everlasting Love)"	Chuck Jackson; Marvin Yancy	Natalie Cole	2:49
13.	"Dream Come True"	Milton Davis	Ta-Gana	3:50
14.	"Groovin'"	Eddie Brigati; Felix Cavaliere	Pato Banton & The Reggae Revolution	3:50
15.	"Let's Get Together"	Richard M. Sherman; Robert B. Sherman	Nobody's Angel	3:08
Total length:				54:08

=== Film score ===
The Parent Trap

Film score by Alan Silvestri
- Released: September 1, 1998
- Length: 39:46
- Label: Hollywood

Alan Silvestri chronology
The Odd Couple II (1998)	The Parent Trap (1998)	Practical Magic (1998)

All tracks are written by Alan Silvestri.

The Parent Trap (Original Score)
No.	Title	Length
1.	"The Disney Logo"	0:16
2.	"Suite from The Parent Trap"	7:12
3.	"Annie and Martin"	1:00
4.	"Shake Hands, Girls"	0:34
5.	"Like Twins"	3:39
6.	"Changes"	2:41
7.	"Hallie Meets Mom"	3:43
8.	"Annie Meets Dad"	2:11
9.	"Vineyard Suite"	1:38
10.	"I Am Annie"	1:17
11.	"Dad's Getting Married"	1:01
12.	"Hallie Breaks the News"	1:49
13.	"You'll Kill in It"	0:53
14.	"Table for Two"	1:51
15.	"She's Gone"	2:05
16.	"Where Dreams Have No End"	2:18
17.	"We Actually Did It"	1:38
18.	"Finale"	3:52
Total length:		39:46

=== Notes ===
1.Not featured in the motion picture.

== Reception ==
=== Box office ===
The film premiered in Los Angeles on July 20, 1998. In its opening weekend, the film grossed $11,148,497 in 2,247 theaters across the United States and Canada, ranking #2 at the box office, behind Saving Private Ryan. By the end of its run, The Parent Trap grossed $66,308,518 domestically and $25,800,000 internationally, totaling $92,108,518 worldwide. The film was released in the United Kingdom on December 11, 1998, and opened at number 3, behind Rush Hour and The Mask of Zorro.

=== Critical response ===
The Parent Trap received generally positive reviews upon release. The review aggregator website Rotten Tomatoes reported an approval rating of 87% based on 54 reviews, with an average rating of 6.9/10. The website's critics' consensus states: "Writer-director Nancy Meyers takes the winning formula of the 1961 original and gives it an amiable modern spin, while young star Lindsay Lohan shines in her breakout role." Metacritic gave the film a weighted average score of 63 out of 100, based on 19 critics, indicating "generally favorable reviews." Audiences polled by CinemaScore gave the film an average grade of "A" on an A+ to F scale.

Gene Siskel and Roger Ebert each gave the film three stars. Critics especially praised Lohan's performance. Critic Kenneth Turan called Lohan "the soul of this film as much as Hayley Mills was of the original", going on to say that "she is more adept than her predecessor at creating two distinct personalities". Nell Minow of Common Sense Media rated the film four stars out of five, calling it "a delightful remake of the Hayley Mills classic." She also praised Lohan's performance, stating "a masterful job of creating two separate characters, each of whom spends a large part of the movie impersonating the other." Lohan won a Young Artist Award for best performance in a feature film.

In a 2021 interview, the star of the original film, Hayley Mills, said, "It was so like the one I did, and yet not. But I thought it was really good." She also praised Lohan's performance, calling her "excellent". In November 2025, The Hollywood Reporter named it one of the 13 best movie remakes, commenting, "There are several reasons this version stands above its predecessor: It's more rewatchable and universally beloved thanks to its humor, memorable characters and heartfelt performances."

=== Accolades ===
Year	Award	Category	Recipient	Result
1999	Artios Awards	Best Casting for Feature Film, Comedy	Ilene Starger	Nominated
1999	Blockbuster Entertainment Awards	Favorite Female Newcomer	Lindsay Lohan	Nominated
1998	International Film Music Critics Association	Best Original Score for a Comedy Film	Alan Silvestri	Nominated
1999	Online Film & Television Association	Best Breakthrough Performance: Female	Lindsay Lohan	Won
1999	Online Film & Television Association	Best Youth Performance	Lindsay Lohan	Nominated
1999	Online Film & Television Association	Best Family Actress	Lindsay Lohan	Nominated
1999	Young Artist Awards	Best Performance in a Feature Film - Leading Young Actress	Lindsay Lohan	Won
1999	Young Artist Awards	Best Family Feature - Comedy	The Parent Trap	Nominated
1998	YoungStar Awards	Best Performance by a Young Actress in a Comedy Film	Lindsay Lohan	Nominated

== Home media ==
The Parent Trap was initially released on VHS in the United States on December 8, 1998. It was released on DVD on March 16, 1999 and a Special "Double Trouble" Edition was released on May 31, 2005. A 20th Anniversary Edition Blu-ray was released as a Disney Movie Club Exclusive on April 24, 2018. The film was also available as a launch title on Disney+.

== Future ==
On February 21, 2018, The Hollywood Reporter reported rumours that reboots of several titles were being considered for development as exclusive content for The Walt Disney Company's streaming service Disney+, with The Parent Trap being one of the projects named in the announcement.

On July 20, 2020, Katie Couric moderated a virtual cast reunion through her Instagram account for the film's 22nd anniversary. Lindsay Lohan, Dennis Quaid, Elaine Hendrix, Lisa Ann Walter, Simon Kunz, Nancy Meyers, and Charles Shyer all participated in the video chat. A charity fundraising effort during the COVID-19 pandemic, the reunion special helped raise money for chef José Andrés' non-profit organization, World Central Kitchen. Quaid then released an extended version of the reunion on his podcast, The Dennissance, the following day.

In March 2025, Quaid addressed the possibility of a sequel, stating "there had been some talk" about it prior to Richardson's passing in 2009, but "it would be impossible to do now," continuing, "I don't think we'd have the heart for it. Maybe one day, another version will be made for another generation. We all still miss Natasha."

In July 2025, Hendrix co-produced an off-Broadway parody of the film titled Ginger Twinsies.

== See also ==
- Lindsay Lohan filmography
