= Vincente Minnelli =

American director (1903–1986)

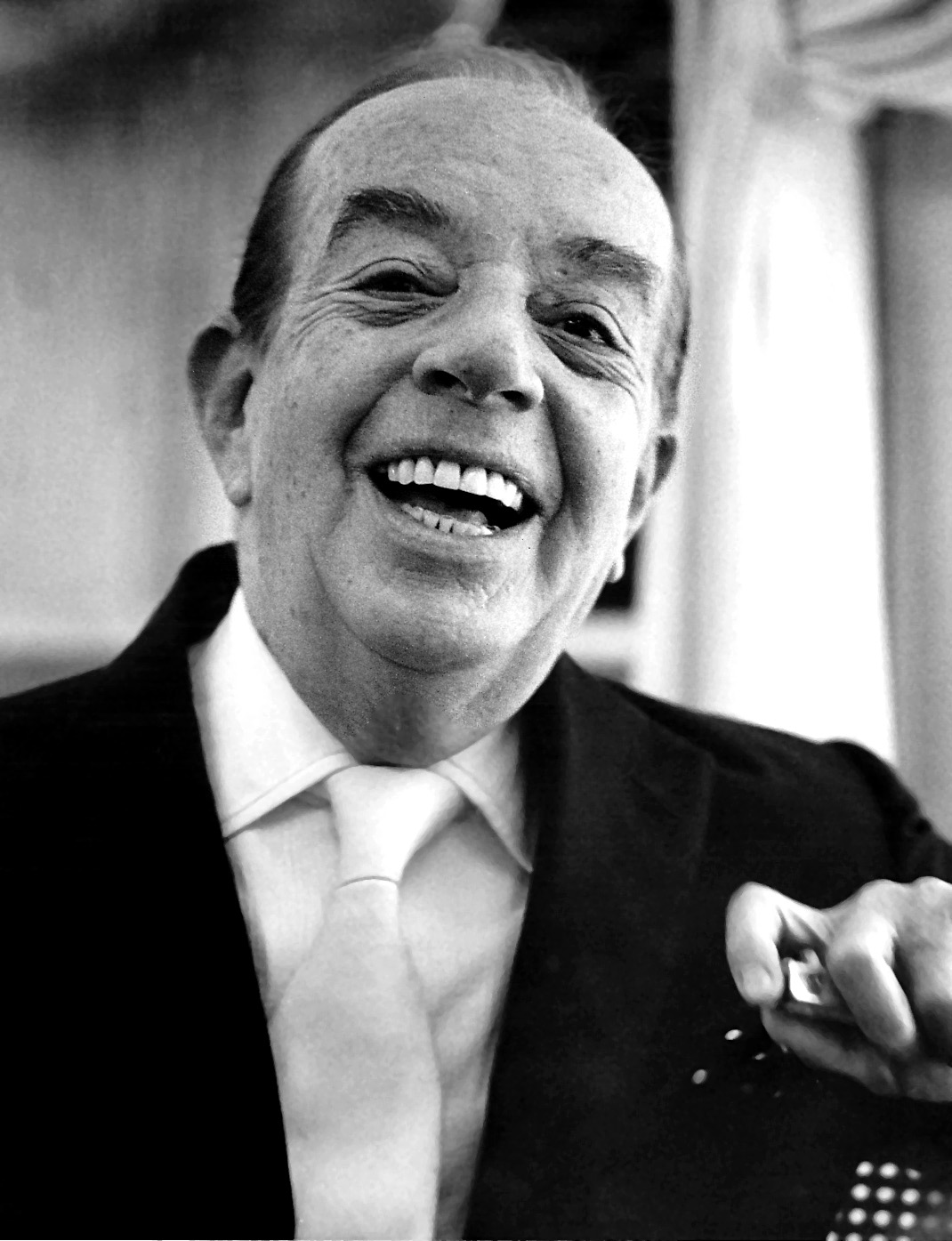
- Minnelli in c. the 1950s
- Born: Lester Anthony Minnelli; February 28, 1903; Chicago, Illinois, U.S.
- Died: July 25, 1986 (aged 83); Beverly Hills, California, U.S.
- Resting place: Forest Lawn Memorial Park, Glendale
- Occupation: Director
- Years active: 1919–1976
- Notable work: Meet Me in St. Louis; An American in Paris; The Bad and the Beautiful; The Band Wagon; Gigi
- Spouses: Judy Garland (m. 1945; div. 1951) Georgette Magnani (m. 1954; div. 1958) Denise Gigante (m. 1962; div. 1971) Margaretta Lee Anderson (m. 1980)
- Children: 2, including Liza

Vincente Minnelli (/ˈvɪnsənt/; born Lester Anthony Minnelli; February 28, 1903 – July 25, 1986) was an American director. From a career spanning over half a century, he is best known for his sophisticated innovation and artistry in musical films. As of 2026, six of his films have been selected for preservation in the United States National Film Registry.

Born in Chicago to theatrical parents, Minnelli made his stage debut at age three in his family's theater. He began his theatrical career as a costume designer for the Balaban and Katz theaters. In 1932, the Paramount-Publix theater chain acquired Balaban and Katz and Minnelli moved to New York to work in Paramount's theaters there. He later became Radio City Music Hall's chief costume designer and then art director, and directed Broadway musicals including At Home Abroad. In 1937, Minnelli briefly worked for Paramount Pictures, but then returned to Broadway where he directed more shows including Jerome Kern and Oscar Hammerstein II's last work together, Very Warm for May.

In 1940, Arthur Freed brought Minnelli to Hollywood to work for Metro-Goldwyn-Mayer (MGM), where he directed sequences in Babes on Broadway (1941) and Panama Hattie (1942). He made his directorial film debut with Cabin in the Sky (1943). A year later, Minnelli directed Meet Me in St. Louis (1944) starring Judy Garland. He married Garland a year later, and their daughter Liza was born in 1946. He subsequently directed Garland in The Clock (1945), Ziegfeld Follies (1945) and The Pirate (1948). They divorced in 1951.

In the 1950s, Minnelli directed numerous comedies, dramas and musicals, including Father of the Bride (1950), An American in Paris (1951), The Bad and the Beautiful (1952), Lust for Life (1956) and Gigi (1958). An American in Paris and Gigi both won the Academy Award for Best Picture, and Minnelli won Best Director for Gigi.

In the early 1960s, failed film projects soured Minnelli's relationship with MGM. He formed his own production company, which partnered with MGM and 20th Century Fox. He then left MGM in 1966. His last films were On a Clear Day You Can See Forever (1970) and A Matter of Time (1976), starring his daughter Liza.

== Background and early life ==
Vincente Minnelli was born Lester Anthony Minnelli, in Chicago on February 28, 1903, to Mina Mary LaLouche LeBeau and Vincent Charles Minnelli.

Vincent Charles' father Vincenzo was a Sicilian and a professor of music. Vincenzo's brother Domenico was Vice-Chancellor of the Gran Corte Civile in Palermo at the time he helped organize the January 12, 1848, uprising there which began the Sicilian revolution of 1848, in which Vincenzo also took part. Vincenzo and Dominico were forced to leave Sicily after the collapse of the provisional Sicilian government. Vincenzo reportedly hid in the catacombs of Palermo for 18 months before being smuggled onto a New York-bound fruit steamer. He eventually became the head of the music department at Ohio Wesleyan University in Delaware, Ohio, where Vincent Charles was born.

Mina was born in Chicago of French-Canadian and, on her mother's side, probably Native American descent. Mina's mother recognized Mina's talent and took her to auditions. Mina's siblings were performers as well: her sister Amy was a trapeze artist with the Ringling Brothers Circus, and her brother was an equestrian before an illness required him to turn to clowning and then to selling candy.

Vincent Charles and his brother Frank founded the Minnelli Brothers' Tent Theater, which toured small towns in the Midwest. Vincent Charles was the musical director. He met Mina when she starred in one of the company's productions; although they initially argued over the music that accompanied her performance, they married in November 1894.

Vincente claimed in his autobiography that he (Lester) was Vincent Charles and Mina's only surviving child, that their first two sons, twins, had died before he was born and their third in Lester's infancy. A later biographer found Minnelli's memories of his brothers to be almost entirely inaccurate, most of all in omitting his brother Paul Felix, four years older and developmentally disabled, who lived to the age of sixty.

Lester spent his early years on the road with his parents. At age three, he made his debut on stage portraying Little Willie in East Lynne, alongside his mother performing dual roles as Lady Isabel and Madame Vine. When the tent theater succumbed to fire, flood and the rise of motion pictures, the Minnellis settled in Vincent Charles' hometown of Delaware, Ohio. Lester spent his first three years of high school there at St. Mary's. Since St. Mary's had no twelfth grade, he spent his last year at Willis High School. There, he appeared in a school production of H.M.S. Pinafore and starred in The Fortune Hunter at the Delaware Opera House.

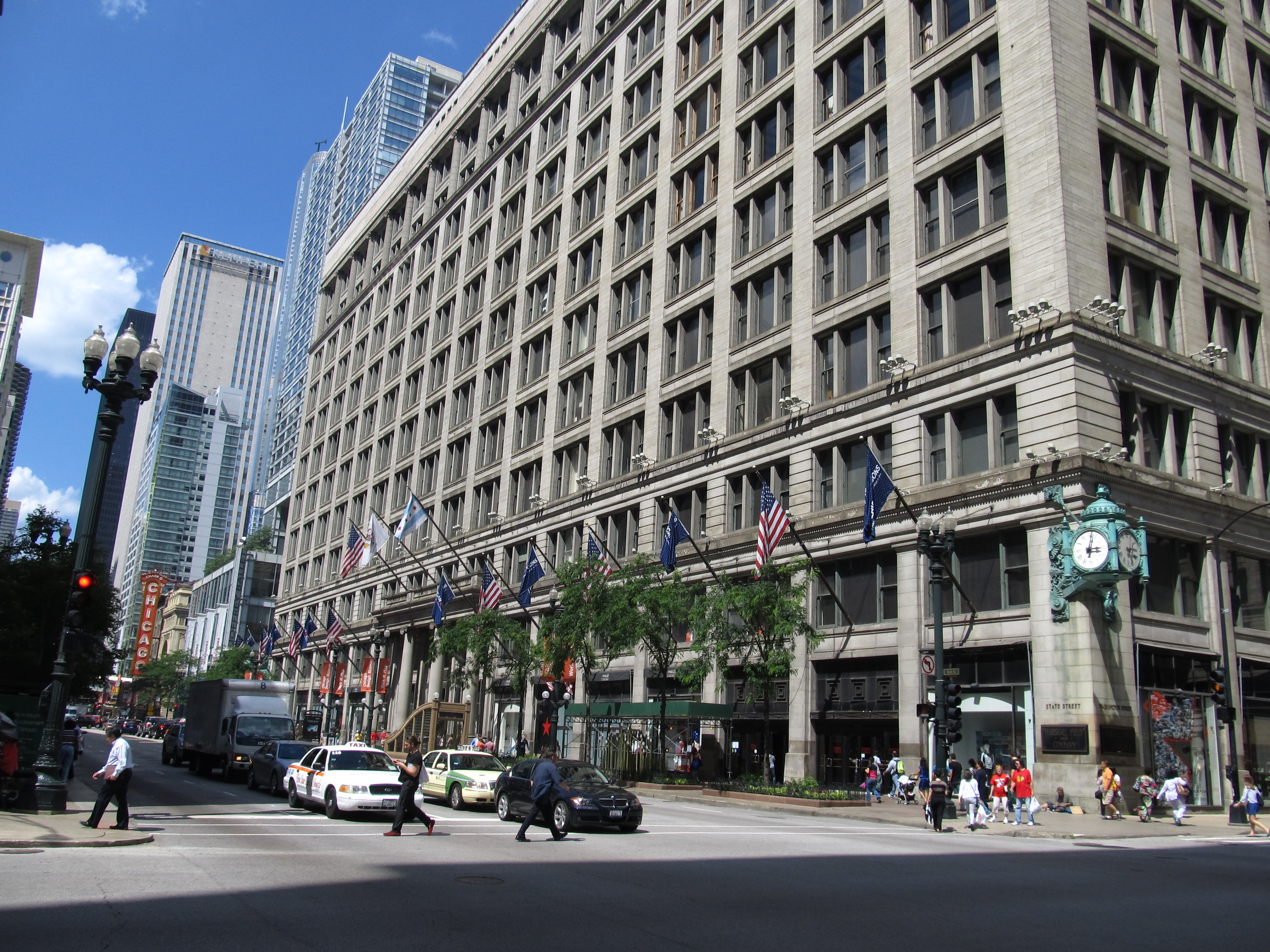
The Marshall Field department store in Chicago (now rebranded as Macy's), where Minnelli decorated display windows

Following his high school graduation, Minnelli moved to Chicago, where he lived briefly with his maternal grandmother Le Beau and his aunt Amy. In search of a job, Minnelli took his portfolio of watercolor paintings to the Marshall Field's department store. Arthur Valair Fraser, the store's display director, reviewed his portfolio and hired him immediately as an apprentice window dresser. There, the store windows were changed four times a year with elaborate themes matched to each corresponding season. Minnelli was first assigned to design the men's store, but he instead asked to design windows on Wabash Avenue where furniture and decorative antique items were frequently rearranged. Meanwhile, Minnelli enrolled in the Art Institute of Chicago, intending to become a painter. However, he dropped out due to his lack of interest in the curriculum.

== Stage career ==
While working at Marshall Field's, Minnelli met a woman who had come to borrow stage props for an acting company that performed behind the Radical Book Shop. She asked him to join them. Minnelli read for the part of a retired sea captain in Eugene O'Neill's play Where the Cross Is Made. He disliked the play and the environment and abandoned acting for good, but remained a frequent attendee of Chicago's theaters. In his spare time, he painted watercolor sketches of contemporary theatre actors, including Ina Claire and Mary Nash. Encouraged by his friends, Minnelli sold his paintings backstage, and earned enough money to live on his own. One night, while selling his artwork backstage, he was approached by Paul Stone, who admired Minnelli's pictorial composition. "If you can do this sort of thing, you can become a fine photographer," Stone told him.

Minnelli left his Marshall Field's job, and worked for Stone as an assistant photographer. Stone specialized in photographing actors and socialites from Chicago's theater district at theatrical luminaries, society matrons and wedding parties. At Stone's Raymor studio, Minnelli photographed numerous celebrities, including Ina Claire, where he coaxed them into capturing their best angles. Minnelli reflected, "Stone's photography was soft, but in sharp focus, so that it could reproduce on the printed page. This taught me a way of creating mood." Months later, Stone suffered a nervous breakdown, and Minnelli assumed his photography duties. Feeling he was not suited for photography as a profession, Minnelli grew dissatisfied and began reading Elizabeth and Joseph Pennell's 1911 biography of James McNeill Whistler, an American painter. Inspired by Whistler's art techniques, Minnelli immersed himself in impressionist and surrealist painters, such as Henri Matisse, Marcel Duchamp, Max Ernst and Salvador Dalí. He also admired the experimental films of Jean Cocteau and Luis Buñuel, and the writings of Sigmund Freud. Around this time, Minnelli dropped Lester from his name, replacing it with "Vincente"; he added the final "e" in order to seem more sophisticated and elegant.

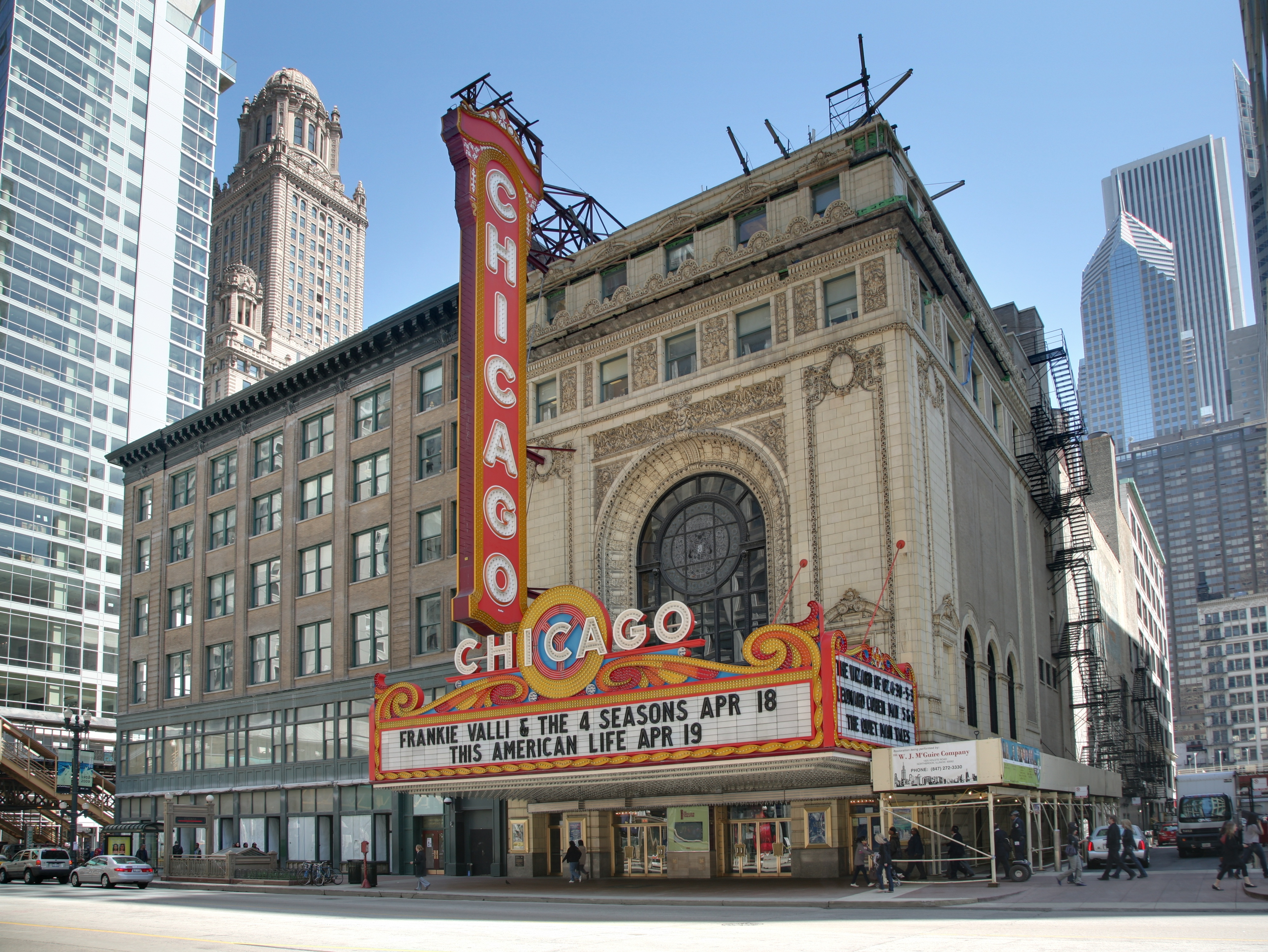
The Chicago Theatre, where Minnelli first designed costumes and sets for the stage

Next, Minnelli approached Frank Cambria, who headed the Chicago Theatre, which was a part of the Balaban and Katz theater chain. He told Cambria that he should open his own costume department, and allow him to run it. Cambria took Minnelli to A. J. Balaban's office, where he was hired as a costume and set designer. Assigned to give the stage productions "a custom touch", Minnelli was shocked the costume department operated on meager budgets. At the time, theatre productions ran one week at the Chicago Theatre where the sets and costumes were disassembled and reused at the Tivoli and Uptown Theatre.

In 1931, Balaban and Katz merged with the Paramount-Publix theater chain, and Minnelli was asked to work on New York stage productions for $150 a week. He left Chicago and rented a tiny Greenwich Village apartment. At Paramount, Minnelli worked exclusively in costumes, and was prevented from designing sets because he wasn't in the set designers' union. He was eventually accepted into the union membership thanks to sponsorship from J. Woodman Thompson, a prominent stage designer. His first Broadway assignment was designing the show curtain for Earl Carroll's 1931 edition of the Vanities musical revue. Taking inspiration from Léon Bakst's designs for the Ballets Russes, Minnelli fashioned a 300 feet (91 m)–tall green and silver curtain to accompany the Art Deco theatrical style. Impressed, Carroll rehired Minnelli as a costume and set designer for the 1932 Vanities.

By this time, Grace Moore asked Minnelli to supervise the art direction for the operetta, The Dubarry. During rehearsals, Minnelli and Moore had creative differences but remained cordial. The operetta had tryouts in Boston, and premiered in New York in November 1932 where it ran for 87 performances. Based on his success, Paramount executives selected him for costume and set design for the 1933 edition of Ziegfeld Follies. However, by 1933, Paramount-Publix filed for bankruptcy protection, in which Adolph Zukor fired B. P. Schulberg as the studio's head of production and began a corporate restructuring. Paramount's East Coast studios were relocated to Astoria, New York, but it was decided their touring theatre unit was no longer profitable and was closed down in favor of touring big bands.

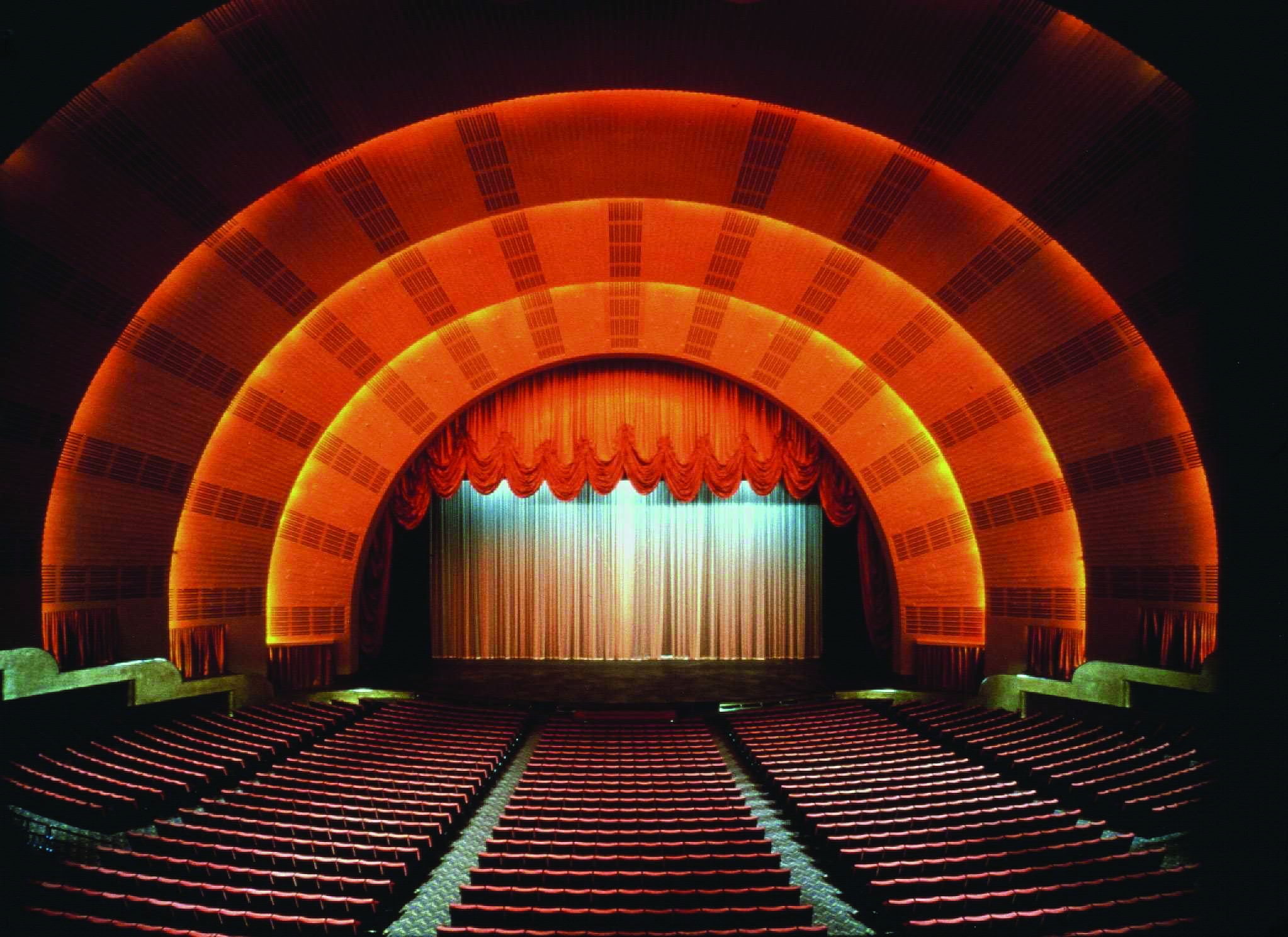
The interior stage of Radio City Music Hall, where Minnelli was chief costume designer and art director

In December 1932, Minnelli was hired as the chief costume designer for the newly-opened Radio City Music Hall. On Thursday nights every week, the Music Hall held a lavish stage performance by the Roxettes before the one-week run for a film. Each week, Minnelli, art director Clark Robinson, and dance director Russell Markert had their rehearsals harshly criticized by theatre impresario Samuel "Roxy" Rothafel. Robinson immediately resigned after one heated exchange with Rothafel, who then selected Minnelli as the new art director. Minnelli was the designer of the "Parade of the Wooden Soldiers", a piece that is still performed today by The Rockettes in their Christmas Spectacular. In July 1933, Minnelli designed the "Water Lily" ballet, a Cuban potpourri illustrated with a backdrop of fighting cocks, a Big Top interior for a circus number, and a Rue de la Paix dress shop to display the Roxettes. In December 1933, Minnelli art-directed a production of the Scheherazade suite by Nikolai Rimsky-Korsakov. His efforts were applauded in the mainstream press, including The New York Times and New York Herald Tribune.

Rothafel was later fired by the theater's board management, having received complaints of his abrasive management style. Rothafel was replaced by W. G. Van Schmus, and in 1934, he selected Minnelli to produce his first stage show titled Coast to Coast, which opened on October 25. Including a song by E. Y. Harburg and Jerry Sears and another by Duke Ellington, the show used several sets, illustrating the French Riviera, the British Gold Coast, Ivory Coast and the Barbary Coast. Backstage, Minnelli was offered a directing job by Lee Shubert for his stage company. Despite the offer, Minnelli continued working for Radio City Music Hall until he left in April 1935. After months of considering, he joined Shubert's organization, signing a contract to produce three musical shows over eighteen months.

While working for the Shuberts, Minnelli directed At Home Abroad, with music composed by Arthur Schwartz and Howard Dietz. Starring Beatrice Lillie, Ethel Waters, and Eleanor Powell, the Broadway musical centered on a married couple who flee the United States, and travel across Europe, Africa, Japan, and the West Indies. The musical had a try-out in Boston and opened at the Winter Garden Theatre on September 19, 1935. In his New York Times review, Brooks Atkinson praised Minnelli's efforts, writing: "Without resorting to opulence he has filled the stage with rich, glowing colors that give the whole work an extraordinary loveliness. Nothing quite so exhilarating as this has borne the Shubert seal before."

While At Home Abroad continued its Broadway run, Minnelli returned to costume and scenic design for the Ziegfeld Follies of 1936, starring Fannie Brice. John Murray Anderson was the director, but during rehearsals, he transferred directing duties to Minnelli. To update the show's look from previous Follies, whose costumes drew from the Louis XVI period, Minnelli used the 1880s as inspiration for the hair styles and elegant costumes. Opening on January 30, 1936, the Ziegfeld Follies was a commercial success, running for five months and reopened for another five months after a summer hiatus. Minnelli was not involved in the revival, but instead chose to direct a musical revue titled The Show Is On. Minnelli devised an original story, featuring new songs from a team of Tin Pan Alley lyricists. The show premiered on Christmas Day 1936 and ran for 237 performances during its initial run. A reprise opened in September 1937 and played for two weeks.

Based on his Broadway success, Hollywood had taken notice of Minnelli as a rising director. Samuel Goldwyn tentatively approached Minnelli to direct The Goldwyn Follies (1938), and in 1937, Paramount Pictures offered him a contract to produce and direct films. Although he was initially reluctant, Minnelli accepted the offer and was paid $2,500 a week. His first project was Times Square, a mystery film set on Broadway. Leo Birinski was hired to write the script, with the plot detailing characters venturing throughout various musical numbers from Broadway shows to piece together vital clues. Minnelli also proposed a surrealist ballet featuring Paramount's contract actors, and held conversations with Kurt Weill about a potential musical film. Minnelli discussed the project with Adolph Zukor, the head of Paramount, but he was uninterested; discussions with William LeBaron, the studio's head of production, did not move the project forward.

Meanwhile, Minnelli proposed the title Shall We Dance (1937) for the Fred Astaire–Ginger Rogers film. He consulted on Raoul Walsh's 1937 film Artists and Models devising the "Public Melody No. 1" number, featuring Louis Armstrong and Martha Raye.

After six months of negotiating, Minnelli was released from his contract and returned to Broadway. Lee Shubert offered him the musical Hooray for What!, which starred Ed Wynn and featured music and lyrics by Harold Arlen and E. Y. Harburg. Minnelli was given only three months for preparation before its premiere on December 1, 1937. The musical was well-received, with Life magazine calling it "the funniest show of the year." Time magazine also applauded: "Sharing credit with Wynn for the show's success is able Vincente Minnelli, trained in the hard school of movie stage-shows, who directed it and designed the scenery."

Inspired by the musicals Pins and Needles and Four Saints in Three Acts, Minnelli began developing a surrealist fantasy titled The Light Fantastic, with Beatrice Lillie in mind to star. He offered her four musical numbers and four sketches outlining his vision, but Lillie, then in England, did not respond in time. He then shifted to a musicalization of S. N. Behrman's play Serena Blandish, wanting to feature Black American actors. Cole Porter was hired to write the musical score. Sid Perelman wrote the libretto, while Lena Horne read for the title role. After six months of development, Minnelli abandoned the project.

Exhausted, Minnelli took a sabbatical break until producer Max Gordon offered him the direction of Very Warm for May. Oscar Hammerstein II and Jerome Kern were hired to write the lyrics and compose the musical score, respectively. Pleased with the musical's first act, Minnelli unsuccessfully tried to rearrange the second act. The musical opened at the Alvin Theatre on November 17, 1939, with musical critic Brooks Atkinson writing in his review that Minnelli had not "solved the confusion of the story."

William Saroyan's play The Time of Your Life had opened three weeks before and was well-regarded. Minnelli became friends with Saroyan and they partnered on a black surrealist musical comedy, with Richard Rodgers and Lorenz Hart composing the score. Saroyan was unable to refine his script to be suitably succinct and exited the project.

== Film career ==
=== 1940–1943: Early MGM films ===
During the spring of 1940, Harburg brought Arthur Freed into Minnelli's studio on East 54th Street. There, Freed suggested he should work for Metro-Goldwyn-Mayer (MGM). Minnelli was hesitant at first because of his unfruitful tenure at Paramount. After a discussion, Minnelli agreed to be paid $300 a week. On April 2, 1940, Minnelli began working for MGM. In 1941, he did minor consulting work, which included critiquing Norman Z. McLeod's Lady Be Good (1941) and advising Pandro Berman to change the beginning of Rio Rita (1942). Some time later, he was brought onto Panama Hattie (1942), filmed by McLeod, which had received lackluster responses during test screenings. In reaction, Freed hired Roy Del Ruth to film reshoots and Minnelli to direct the musical numbers featuring Lena Horne.

Meanwhile, Minnelli visited the set for Strike Up the Band (1940), starring Mickey Rooney and Judy Garland. Freed mentioned they needed a musical number for a scene where Rooney's character aspires to be like Paul Whiteman, a bandleader. Minnelli suggested using a bowl of fruits, having spotted one on set. Freed liked the idea and hired Henry Fox to create a tabletop, while George Pal provided the stop motion animation of the musicians made of fruit. During filming, Minnelli met Garland, who had just turned 18 years old, for the first time. Minnelli subsequently worked on Busby Berkeley's Babes on Broadway (1941), which also starred Rooney and Garland, for the "Ghost Theater" sequence. Minnelli suggested they imitate veteran Broadway stars, but Berkeley rejected the idea.

In 1942, Freed offered Minnelli the direction of Cabin in the Sky (1943). Minnelli accepted, writing he "interpreted the assignment, with more freedom than I'd dreamed possible, as just reward for past contributions." Based on the 1940 musical by Vernon Duke and John La Touche, Cabin in the Sky tells the story of Petunia (Ethel Waters), a devout woman, who prays for the soul of her gambler-husband "Little" Joe Jackson (Eddie "Rochester" Anderson).

Filming began in August 1942, with only Waters and Rex Ingram reprising their Broadway roles. Lena Horne was cast as Georgia Brown, a seductive woman who tempts Jackson. During production, Minnelli shot a musical number, "Ain't It the Truth," featuring Horne in a bubble bath. Joseph Breen of the Motion Picture Production Code objected to the scene, which was then excised from the film. Modestly budgeted at under $700,000, Cabin in the Sky earned $1.6 million at the box office.

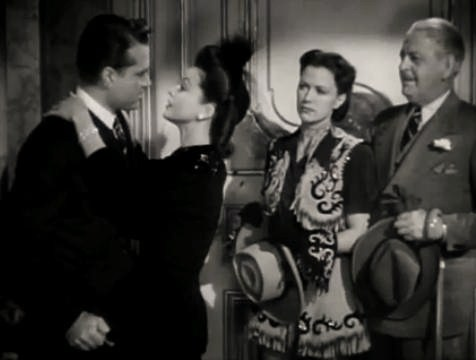
From left to right: Red Skelton, Patricia Dane, Eleanor Powell, and Thurston Hall in I Dood It (1943)

Three weeks after he finished filming Cabin in the Sky, Minnelli was assigned to direct I Dood It (1943), starring Red Skelton and Eleanor Powell. Del Ruth was the film's original director but he had been drafted into the United States Army, leaving the film unfinished, and MGM dissatisfied with his cut. The film's producer Jack Cummings hoped Minnelli would inject his style into the film. Onboard as director, Minnelli hired Sig Herzig and Fred Saidy to rewrite the script.

In the film, a loose remake of Spite Marriage (1929), Skelton plays Joseph Renolds, a tailor's assistant, who becomes enamored with Constance Shaw (Powell), a Broadway star, and attends every performance of her Civil War melodrama. Shaw impulsively marries Renolds to spite her lover (Richard Ainley). Herzig and Saidy updated the plot by having Skelton's character reveal John Hodiak's character to be a spy for the Axis powers.

Between projects, Minnelli directed Lena Horne in her "Honeysuckle Rose" segment in Thousands Cheer (1943).

=== 1944–1949: Films with Judy Garland ===
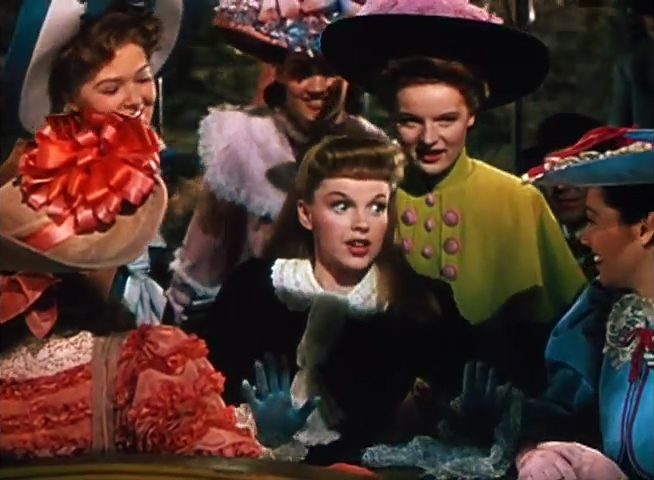
Judy Garland in Meet Me in St. Louis (1944)

For Meet Me in St. Louis (1944), Freed again hired Minnelli to direct. Framed around the four seasons, the film tells of the Smith family and their conflicts, with the conclusion focused on the family's celebration of the 1904 St. Louis World's Fair. Judy Garland was cast as Esther Smith, though she felt her role would be overshadowed by Margaret O'Brien, who was portraying Tootie. Principal photography began on December 7, 1943 though continued filming was frequently delayed by Garland's tardiness and claims of illness.

Determined to have Garland's physical beauty showcased, Minnelli requested make-up artist Dorothy Ponedel be assigned to Garland. Ponedel refined Garland's appearance, which included extending and reshaping her eyebrows, changing her hairline, modifying her lip line and removing her nose discs and dental caps. Filming wrapped on April 7, 1944. During filming, Garland and Minnelli had some creative differences, though Garland grew closer to him after she saw in the dailies how good he made her look. (At the time, Garland was estranged from her husband David Rose, and had just ended an affair with producer Joseph L. Mankiewicz.) Premiering in November 1944, the film received universal critical acclaim and exceeded box office expectations, earning $7.6 million worldwide during its initial run.

Meanwhile, the 1945 musical Ziegfeld Follies was in production with George Sidney as the film's initial director. The film featured several musical numbers from the Ziegfeld Follies musical revues, starring many of MGM's contracted talents. Midway through filming, Sidney asked to leave the production and Minnelli was hired to finish filming. Garland's segment was shot in July 1944, with principal photography concluding in August. Minnelli directed a total of ten segments, with the remaining four directed by Sidney, Lemuel Ayers, Roy Del Ruth, and Robert Lewis.

The Clock (1945) was Garland's first straight dramatic film after starring in several musical films. Fred Zinnemann was initially hired to direct the film. By August 1944, he was removed at Garland's request after they could not get along. When Freed asked who she wanted to replace him, Garland requested Minnelli to direct. Minnelli accepted the assignment on two conditions: Zinnemann would not object to his hiring and he would have the unconditional trust with Garland. Zinnemann's footage was discarded aside from the exterior shots of New York. Pennsylvania Station was recreated on the MGM backlot while local New York areas were filmed and used as rear projection. On January 9, 1945, before Garland was to film The Harvey Girls (1946), Minnelli and Garland were engaged to be married. They were married on June 15, in Garland's mother's house in Wilshire, Los Angeles.

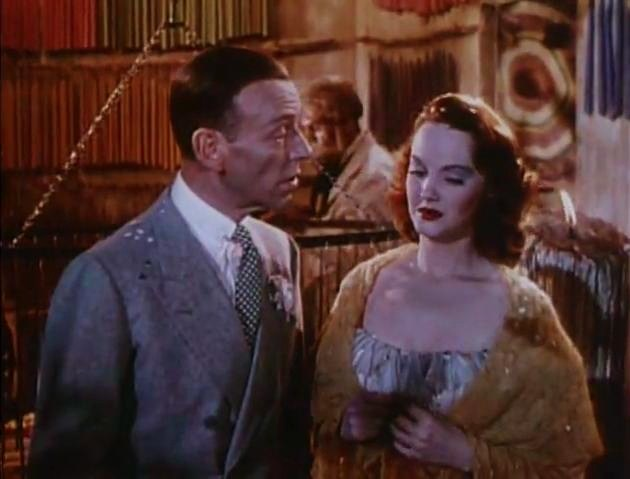
Lucille Bremer and Fred Astaire in Yolanda and the Thief (1945)

Minnelli's next film was Yolanda and the Thief (1945) starring Fred Astaire and Lucille Bremer. Adapted from the 1943 magazine short story by Ludwig Bemelmans and Jacques Théry, the film tells of two con men (Astaire and Frank Morgan) who are hiding from extradition in South America. Both men learn about Yolanda, a young heiress living a sheltered life in a convent and decide to con her. One night, Yolanda prays for a "guardian angel" which Astaire's character impersonates. Filming began on January 15, 1945 and wrapped four months later. Upon its release, the film received mixed reviews with criticism of its script and was a commercial disappointment.

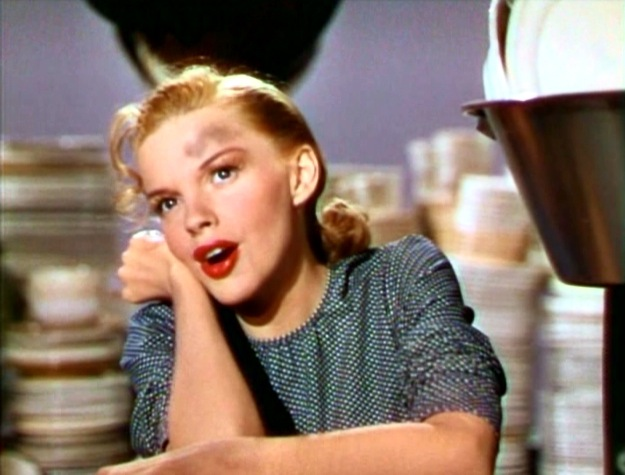
Minnelli directed Garland's scenes in Till the Clouds Roll By (1946).

By this point, Garland had become pregnant with her first daughter, Liza. A musicalized biopic of Jerome Kern titled Till the Clouds Roll By (1946) was scheduled to begin production in October 1945. Garland had been cast as Marilyn Miller and Minnelli had been assigned to direct Garland's scenes. Her scenes took two weeks to complete and were finished in November.

Minnelli was hired to direct Undercurrent (1946) by Pandro S. Berman, which starred Katharine Hepburn, Robert Taylor, and Robert Mitchum. Based on a story by Thelma Strabel, the film centers on a college professor's daughter from a small town who moves to the city to live with her new husband, an industrialist. She soon learns about her missing brother-in-law, whom her husband is suspected of murdering, and investigates his disappearance. During filming, Hepburn was initially displeased with Minnelli as her director, though they became cordial as production continued. Released in November 1946, Undercurrent received mixed reviews but was a box office success.

The idea to adapt S. N. Behrman's play The Pirate originated with Minnelli, with Garland suggesting it be adapted into a musical during their honeymoon. The story tells of Manuela, a Caribbean woman, who daydreams of the pirate Macoco, better known as Mack the Black. She is unknowingly engaged to him, masquerading as Don Pedro, the portly and elderly village mayor. Serafin, a traveling actor, roleplays as the pirate to win Manuela's affection. Freed initially resisted the idea but reluctantly agreed to produce it after reading a treatment. To replicate the success of For Me and My Gal (1942), Gene Kelly was cast to reunite his pairing with Garland.

On December 27, 1946, a recording session with Garland had to be cancelled due to her illness. Due to Garland's frequent absences, filming did not begin until February 1947. Out of 135 days for rehearsals, filming and reshoots, Garland was absent for 99. After a preview in October, Minnelli agreed to shorten the film's run time. Between October 21 and December 19, reshoots were taken with the musical number "Voodoo" replaced with a livelier reshoot of "Mack the Black". When filming wrapped, the production had gone over budget, costing $3.7 million. The film earned over $2.9 million at the box office, and lost the studio nearly $2.2 million.

Despite the financial failure of The Pirate, Minnelli was slated to direct Easter Parade (1948) with Garland and Gene Kelly cast in the lead roles (though Kelly was later replaced by Fred Astaire after a rehearsal injury). Rehearsals began on September 5, 1947, but five days later, Minnelli was called into Freed's office and removed from the film. Freed had ordered Minnelli's removal based on the advice of Garland's psychiatrist. Charles Walters was hired to replace him. For almost a year, Minnelli was without a film project while Garland filmed Easter Parade and In the Good Old Summertime (1949). Pandro Berman then asked Minnelli to direct a film adaptation of Gustave Flaubert's novel Madame Bovary. Minnelli accepted, because it was one of his favorite novels.

Lana Turner was initially offered the lead role but Minnelli rejected the idea because Turner was perceived as a sex symbol. The Production Code also warned that Turner's onscreen image, along with the novel's portrayal of marriage infidelity, would violate its guidelines. Jennifer Jones was under contract to her husband David O. Selznick, but MGM executive Benjamin Thau successfully negotiated a stipulation deal to borrow her. James Mason had wanted to play the role of Flaubert, while Louis Jourdan and Alf Kjellin (billed as Christopher Kent) were lent onto the film courtesy of Selznick.

Madame Bovary was shot from mid-December 1948 to February 1949. During production, Minnelli notably filmed an elaborate waltz sequence, utilizing 360-degree pan camera movements accompanied to Miklós Rózsa's pre-recorded instrumental score. Biographer Stephen Harvey called it "one of the more audacious epiphanies in any Minnelli movie." Released in August 1949, critics deemed Madame Bovary as an unusually distinguished film, adapting its source material with considerable drama and atmosphere. At the box office, the film earned $2 million.

That same year, Minnelli directed the climax sequence in Robert Z. Leonard's The Bribe (1949).

=== 1950–1958: Peak years ===
==== Father of the Bride ====
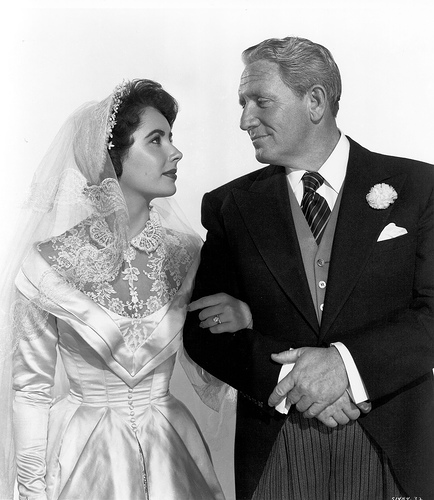
Minnelli directed Spencer Tracy and Elizabeth Taylor in Father of the Bride (1950).

Minnelli's subsequent collaboration with Pandro S. Berman was Father of the Bride (1950) based on the bestselling 1949 novel by Edward Streeter. Jack Benny pursued the lead role and was given a screen test, but Minnelli wanted Spencer Tracy and cast him. Elizabeth Taylor and Joan Bennett were cast as the bride and her mother, respectively. Filming began on January 16, 1950 and wrapped a month and a day later. Released in May 1950, the film earned $4.15 million in distributor rentals at the box office.

Critical reception was positive, with Bosley Crowther of The New York Times calling the film "equally wonderful" when compared to the book, with "all the warmth and poignancy and understanding that makes the Streeter treatise much beloved." The film was nominated for three Academy Awards for Best Picture, Best Actor, and Best Screenplay.

==== An American in Paris ====
An American in Paris (1951) began when Arthur Freed told Ira Gershwin he wanted to adapt his late brother George's orchestral piece An American in Paris into a ballet sequence for a film. In 1949, MGM acquired the rights to George's catalogue from his estate for $158,750 (equivalent to $2.2 million in 2026). The story was inspired by a Life magazine article of American G.I.s studying art in Paris on sponsorship from the G.I. Bill, which Freed had remembered.

In the film, Jerry Mulligan (Kelly) is an artist studying in Paris. He meets Milo Roberts (Nina Foch), an heiress and arts patron who expresses a romantic and professional interest in Jerry. Meanwhile, Jerry romances Lise Bouvier (Leslie Caron), a young teen engaged to Henri Baurel (Georges Guétary), a friend of Jerry's. Filming began on August 1, 1950 at the MGM studios, though production was halted on September 15 to prepare for the ballet sequence. Minnelli left to direct another film, Father's Little Dividend (1951), the sequel to Father of the Bride. Filming began on October 9 and was finished 23 days later. After this, Minnelli returned to film the ballet sequence, starting on December 6 and wrapping on January 8, 1951.

Released in 1951, An American in Paris proved popular with audiences, earning over $8 million in the United States. Kelly and Caron were praised by film critics, though the film's dramatic continuity was criticized. At the 1952 Academy Awards, the film was nominated for eight Oscars and won six, including Best Picture. Kelly was given an Academy Honorary Award. Minnelli was nominated for Best Director, though he lost to George Stevens for A Place in the Sun (1951).

On January 18, 1951, Minnelli was announced to direct a musical film adaptation of Mark Twain's Huckleberry Finn. Dean Stockwell was cast in the title role. William Warfield was cast as Jim, along with Gene Kelly and Danny Kaye as the Duke and Dauphin respectively. Rehearsals began in August; simultaneously, Minnelli filmed the fashion show finale for Mervyn LeRoy's Lovely to Look At (1952). Adrian Greenburg (also known as "Adrian") and Tony Duquette had designed costumes for the sequence costing over $100,000 (equivalent to $1.2 million in 2026). Minnelli declined to be credited for the film. On September 21, production on Huckleberry Finn was postponed indefinitely after Kelly and Kaye had withdrew.

==== The Bad and the Beautiful ====
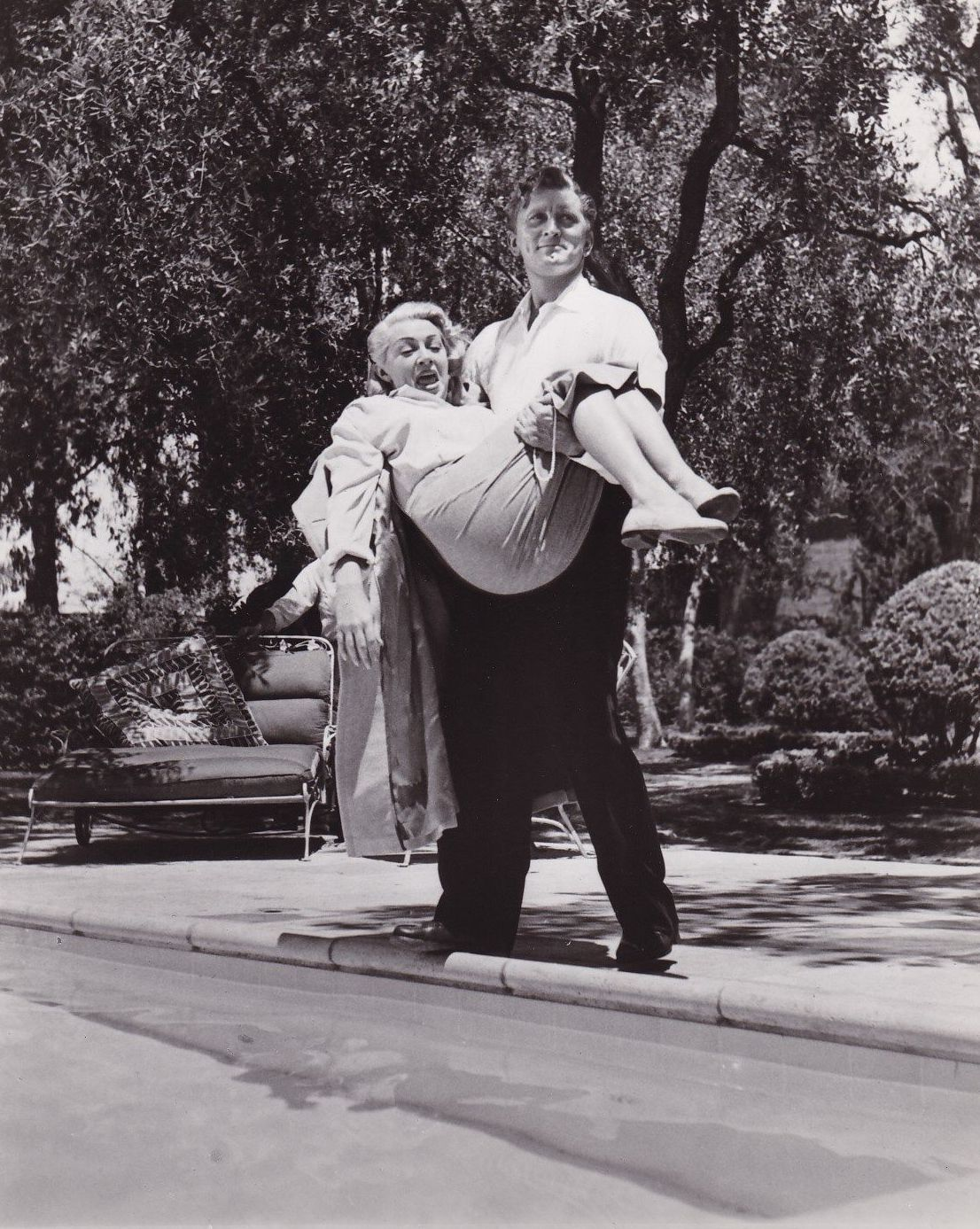
Lana Turner and Kirk Douglas during filming for The Bad and the Beautiful (1952)

Due to its similarities with An American in Paris (1951), Minnelli turned down an offer to direct Lili (1953). During a lunch meeting at the Romanoff's, MGM producer John Houseman showed Minnelli a screenplay draft titled Memorial to a Bad Man based on a short story by George Bradshaw. It was later retitled The Bad and the Beautiful (1952). Minnelli agreed to direct, with Kirk Douglas as his sole choice to portray ruthless film producer Jonathan Shields. However, MGM production head Dore Schary had offered the role to Clark Gable but he declined. Douglas read the script and accepted the role. Lana Turner was hired to portray Georgina Lorrison, the "beautiful"; when both casting choices were announced, the trades insinuated: "when these two get together..."

The story focuses on Jonathan Shields (Douglas) and how he rises in Hollywood by manipulating three individuals: actress Georgina (Turner), whom he deceives by professing his love, director Fred Amiel (Barry Sullivan), whose picture he expropriates, and screenwriter James Bartlow (Dick Powell), who loses his wife to a scandalous affair.

Upon its release, critics praised the film's seedy depiction of Hollywood and the performances from the cast, most particularly Douglas, Turner and Gloria Grahame. The scene of Georgina's emotional breakdown inside a moving vehicle was singled out for praise. At the 1953 Academy Awards, The Bad and the Beautiful was nominated for six Oscars, winning five including Grahame for Best Supporting Actress.

At the behest of Sidney Franklin, Minnelli directed two segments, "Mademoiselle" and "Why Should I Cry", of the 1953 anthology film The Story of Three Loves. Minnelli agreed to direct "Mademoiselle", adapted from the short story "Lucy and the Stranger" by Arnold Lippschitz. Reuniting with Leslie Caron, the segment featured Ricky Nelson, Zsa Zsa Gabor, Farley Granger, and Ethel Barrymore. Filming lasted for three weeks until it wrapped in February 1952. "Why Should I Cry" was dropped and reworked into Torch Song (1953), starring Joan Crawford.

==== The Band Wagon ====
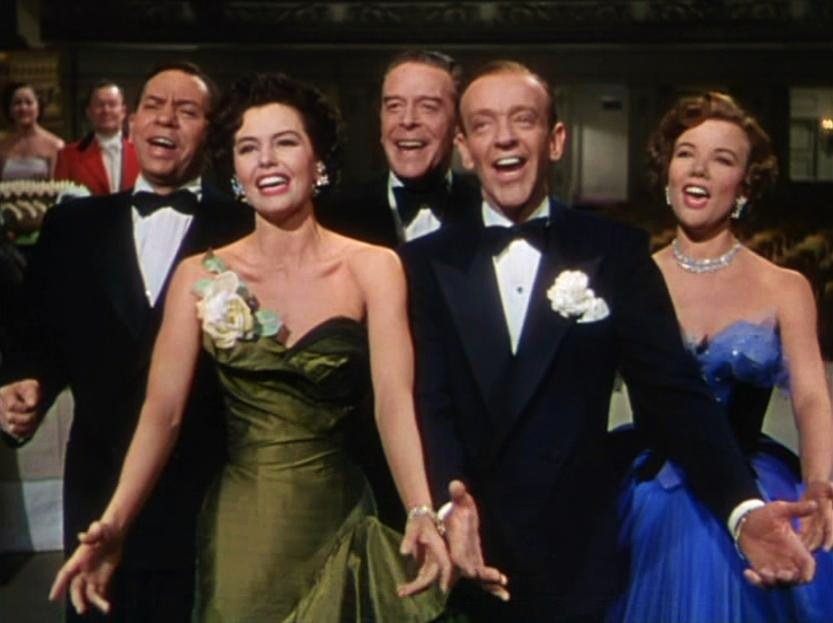
The cast of The Band Wagon (1953) L–R: Oscar Levant, Cyd Charisse, Jack Buchanan, Fred Astaire, and Nanette Fabray

Because of the success of An American in Paris (1951) and Singin' in the Rain (1952), Freed decided to adapt the songs of Arthur Schwartz and Howard Dietz for MGM's next musical film, The Band Wagon (1953). To write a suitable storyline, Minnelli turned to the screenwriting team of Betty Comden and Adolph Green to devise the script. The film tells of Tony Hunter, an aging musical star who hopes a Broadway show will restart his career. He meets with two writer friends and a Broadway producer who stage a musical, starring Hunter and a ballerina. Fred Astaire was cast as Troy Hunter, while the writers Lester and Lilly Marton (portrayed by Oscar Levant and Nanette Fabray) were loosely based by Comden and Green. Cyd Charisse was cast as the ballerina Gabrielle Gerard.

Filming began on October 20, 1952, and was finished on January 28, 1953. Premiering in July 1953, The Band Wagon received enthusiastic critical reception and earned $5.6 million at the box office. Archer Winsten, writing for the New York Post, called the film "the best musical of the month, year, the decade, or, for all I know, of all time." The film received three Academy Award nominations for Best Story and Screenplay, Best Costume Design (Color), and Best Scoring of a Musical Picture.

Minnelli reteamed with Pandro S. Berman and the screenwriting team of Albert Hackett and Frances Goodrich for The Long, Long Trailer (1954), which starred Lucille Ball and Desi Arnaz. Adapted from the 1951 novel by Clinton Twiss, a married couple, Nicky and Tacy Collins, purchases a new travel trailer home and spend a year traveling across the United States. Shot during the summer hiatus for I Love Lucy, filming began on June 18, 1953, and wrapped the next month. On February 18, 1954, the film premiered at the Radio City Music Hall and earned $4.5 million in distributor rentals.

==== Brigadoon ====
In March 1951, MGM acquired the screen rights to Alan Jay Lerner and Frederick Loewe's Broadway musical Brigadoon. Gene Kelly and Kathryn Grayson were set to star, though Kelly's precommitments delayed production for two years. During the interim, Grayson departed and Moira Shearer was considered as a replacement, but Freed decided to cast Cyd Charisse. Brigadoon was Minnelli's first film recorded in stereophonic sound and shot in the widescreen CinemaScope format, which Minnelli had disliked as he was concerned the format would crop the actors' feet.

Minnelli, Kelly and Freed initially planned to film on location in Scotland while interior scenes would be shot at the MGM-British Studios in Borehamwood. In the spring of 1953, Kelly and Freed scouted potential filming locations. Minnelli stayed behind, as he was occupied with The Long, Long Trailer. Kelly and Freed were convinced the Scottish climate was unreliable, and decided to film entirely on the MGM backlot in Culver City, California.

The story concerns two Americans, Tommy Albright and Jeff Douglas (Kelly and Van Johnson), who get lost during a hunting trip in Scotland. They wander into the village of Brigadoon, which becomes visible once every century. During a joyful wedding, Tommy falls in love with a local woman Fiona Campbell (Charisse) despite his engagement to Jane Ashton (Elaine Stewart) back home.

Filming began on December 9, 1953, and wrapped on March 18, 1954. During filming, Minnelli and Kelly held creative differences over the film. Kelly had envisioned Brigadoon as an outdoor picture whereas Minnelli saw it as a theatrical artifice. Released in 1954, Brigadoon premiered at the Radio City Music Hall, and received mixed reviews from film critics. In his New York Times review, Bosley Crowther dismissed the film as "curiously flat and out-of-joint, rambling all over creation and seldom generating warmth or charm." The film earned $3.3 million at the box office but did not earn enough to offset the production and distribution costs.

During the fall of 1953, Minnelli began developing a film adaptation of William Henry Hudson's novel Green Mansions. The next year, Lerner was recruited to write the screenplay. Intending to shoot on location in South America, Minnelli scouted locations in Peru, Panama, British Guiana, and Venezuela. There, he, art director E. Preston Ames, and a skeletal film crew shot 16 mm test footage of the jungles in Venezuela. Pier Angeli and Edmund Purdom were courted for the lead roles and given a screen test, but Freed was left unimpressed. The project was cancelled, though it later became a 1959 film starring Audrey Hepburn.

==== The Cobweb ====
Minnelli accepted the offer to direct The Cobweb (1955) after John Houseman handed him the 1954 novel by William Gibson. The story concerns the staff working at a psychiatry clinic, who are embroiled in a dispute over the latest draperies to be installed in the library. Minnelli read John Paxton's script adaptation of the novel, but he felt it lacked "the flavor of the book." He then approached Gibson to write additional dialogue to the script.

Richard Widmark, Lauren Bacall, Gloria Grahame, Lillian Gish, and newcomers John Kerr and Susan Strasberg were cast in the ensemble. The film was shot over seven weeks, starting in December 1954. It received mixed reviews and failed at the box office, earning $1.5 million in distributor rentals.

==== Lust for Life ====
While The Cobweb was being edited, Minnelli discussed with MGM production head Dore Schary a film version of the novel Lust for Life by Irving Stone as his next project. MGM had already obtained the film rights, though they requested an extension as its moratorium would lapse by December 1955. In the meantime, Schary and Arthur Freed wanted Minnelli to shoot a film adaptation of the Broadway musical Kismet. Minnelli refused as he disliked the original Broadway production. Schary offered Minnelli creative autonomy to film Lust for Life provided he would film Kismet first.

Set in Baghdad, Kismet is about an impoverished poet (Howard Keel) who impersonates the sorcerer Hajj the Beggar that deceives an elderly thief (Jay C. Flippen) and the Wazir (Sebastian Cabot) and his wife Lalume (Dolores Gray). Meanwhile, the poet's daughter Marsinah (Ann Blyth) falls in love with the young Caliph (Vic Damone). The film began shooting on May 23, 1955. Ten days before filming was complete, Minnelli left for France to begin filming Lust for Life (1956). Stanley Donen was brought in to finish the film, which was completed on July 22, 1955. Kismet premiered on October 8, 1955 at the Radio City Music Hall, earning $2.9 million at the box office, against a production budget of $2.6 million.

Simultaneously, Kirk Douglas' production company Byrna Productions announced they were producing Lust for Life, with Jean Negulesco as director. Soon after, Douglas was contacted by MGM, who stated they held the rights. A compromise was reached to have Minnelli direct and Douglas star as Vincent van Gogh. Filmed entirely on location in France, Belgium and the Netherlands, filming started in August 1955 and ended in December 1955. Throughout filming, Douglas notably remained in character. Minnelli called the film his personal favorite of the ones he directed.

Released in September 1956, Lust for Life was mildly received by audiences, earning nearly $1.6 million in box office rentals. However, at the 1957 Academy Awards, the film received four Academy Award nominations for Best Actor (Kirk Douglas), Best Supporting Actor (Anthony Quinn), Best Screenplay, and Best Art Direction/Set Decoration — Color. Quinn won for Best Supporting Actor.

==== Tea and Sympathy ====
Robert Anderson's play Tea and Sympathy premiered on Broadway in 1953, and ran over 700 performances. Directed by Elia Kazan, the play starred Deborah Kerr as Laura, the wife of a housemaster at an all-boys prep school, who becomes affectionate towards Tom, a young student at the school, who is accused of being a homosexual. Laura offers herself to Tom to allow him to demonstrate his masculinity. To satisfy the Production Code Administration and the Catholic Legion of Decency, Anderson removed references to homosexuality from his script, and restructured it to tell the central drama in flashback and explain how Laura and Tom paid for their affair.

Minnelli had agreed to direct Tea and Sympathy before he left for Europe to film Lust for Life. Deborah Kerr, John Kerr (no relation), and Leif Erickson reprised their roles from the Broadway production. Principal photography began in the spring of 1956, and wrapped after seven weeks. Released in September 1956, Tea and Sympathy received positive reviews from film critics. It earned nearly $2.2 million in box office rentals.

==== Designing Woman ====
Designing Woman (1957) began as an original story by Helen Rose, MGM's costume designer, loosely taken from Woman of the Year (1942). Intended as a star vehicle for Grace Kelly, James Stewart was cast opposite her as the male lead and Joshua Logan was to direct. However, Kelly left the project when she retired from acting, two months after marrying Rainier III, Prince of Monaco. Stewart and Logan departed as well. In haste, Schary hired Minnelli to direct the film. As the new director, Minnelli selected Gregory Peck and Lauren Bacall as the new leads.

Principal photography began on September 10, 1956 and was finished ten weeks later, with on-location filming at the Newport Beach, Beverly Hills Hotel, and Marineland. Released in May 1957, Designing Woman earned $3.7 million worldwide, but resulted in a loss of $136,000.

During pre-production for Gigi (1958), Minnelli replaced Ronald Neame during filming for The Seventh Sin (1957), a film adaptation of W. Somerset Maugham's novel The Painted Veil. Neame had developed creative differences with MGM producer David Lewis. Sidney Franklin replaced Lewis as producer. Despite his contributions, Minnelli personally requested not to be credited.

==== Gigi ====
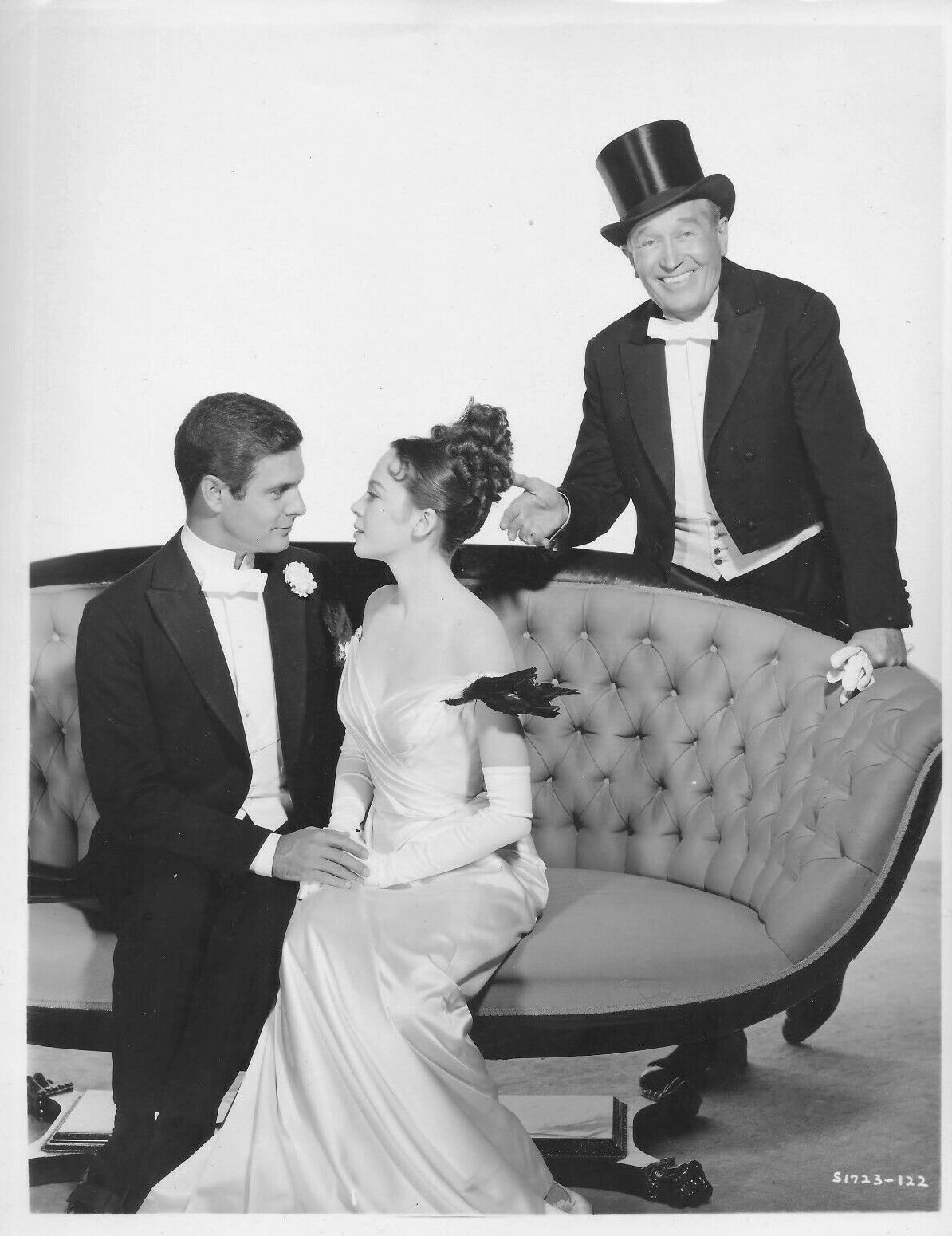
Louis Jourdan, Leslie Caron, and Maurice Chevalier in a publicity photo for Gigi

Gigi (1958) originated as a 1944 novella by Colette, which was adapted into a 1949 film starring Danièle Delorme. In 1951, playwright Anita Loos adapted the novella into a play, which went to Broadway and starred Audrey Hepburn in her first major role. Minnelli and Arthur Freed had discussed adapting Gigi years prior, but in 1953, Freed's interest was renewed after seeing the Broadway play. Both approached Alan Jay Lerner and Frederick Loewe, fresh off their success from My Fair Lady, to compose songs for their adaptation. Lerner agreed on two conditions: that Honoré Lachaille's role be expanded, and that Maurice Chevalier be cast in the film.

In March 1957, Lerner approached Hepburn to reprise the role, but she declined. Minnelli instead cast Leslie Caron, having directed her in An American in Paris (1951). Louis Jourdan was cast as Gigi's lover Gaston, while Chevalier, Hermione Gingold, Eva Gabor and Isabel Jeans filled the supporting roles. In July 1957, principal photography began on location in Paris during a massive heat wave. Because of the heavy period clothes, the cast members became overheated and even Minnelli contracted a case of whooping cough. Concerned about the escalating production costs, Benjamin Thau ordered for the production to resume on the MGM studio backlot. A scene that was intended to be shot in Trouville, France was instead filmed in Venice Beach, California. Filming was finished on October 30, 1957.

Test previews for Gigi were poorly received, in which MGM president Joseph Vogel ordered for nine days of reshoots. However, Minnelli was unavailable as he was filming The Reluctant Debutante (1958) overseas. Charles Walters was brought in to film the reshoots. The film premiered on May 15, 1958 at the Royale Theatre in New York, and received critical acclaim. At the 1959 Academy Awards, Gigi won all nine of its nominations, including for Best Picture and Best Director for Minnelli.

When Gigi premiered, Minnelli had spent seven weeks filming The Reluctant Debutante (1958) from mid-February to early April. Adapted from the 1955 play by William Douglas Home, the story centers on Jane Broadbent, an American teenage girl, who arrives in London to attend debutante balls for her wealthy father Lord Jimmy Broadbent and stepmother Lady Sheila. During the fall of 1957, Pandro Berman showed Minnelli a first draft of the script. Minnelli felt Americanizing the play was the wrong approach, but agreed to direct. Berman and Minnelli approached Rex Harrison and Kay Kendall with the central roles; Harrison joined Minnelli in insisting on a rewrite of the script which reinstated the London locale. Berman nevertheless added American actress Sandra Dee to the cast to broaden the film's appeal to Americans. The Reluctant Debutante premiered at Radio City Music Hall in August 1958 to positive reviews. It earned $1.9 million in box office rentals against a production budget of nearly $2.3 million.

==== Some Came Running ====
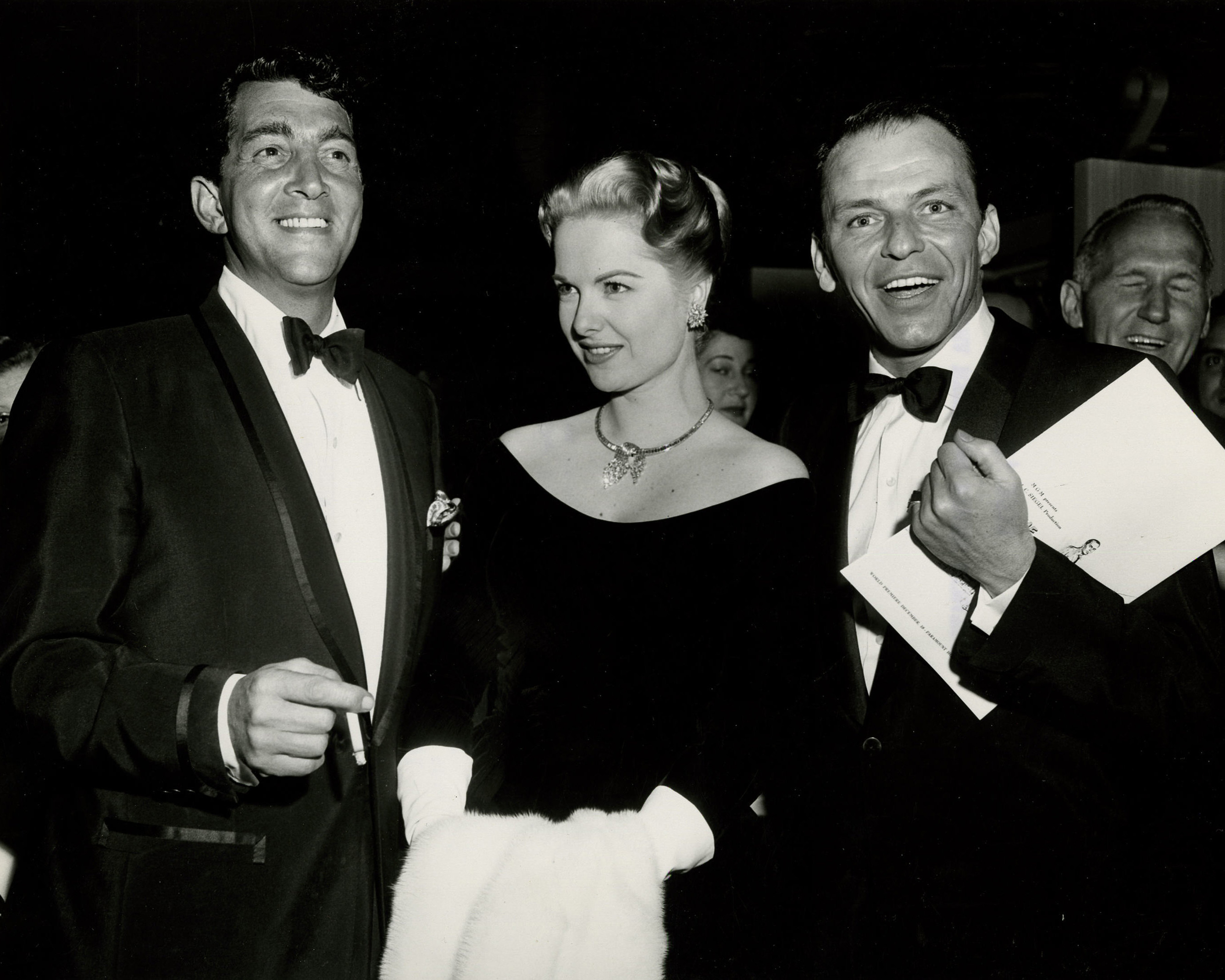
Dean Martin, Martha Hyer, and Frank Sinatra at the world premiere of Some Came Running

In spring 1958, MGM purchased the film rights to James Jones's 1957 novel Some Came Running. Sol Siegel, who had succeeded Schary as the new production head, hired Minnelli to direct the film adaptation. The novel tells of David Hirsh, an Army veteran and novelist, who returns home to the fictional town of Parkman, Indiana. He romances Gwen French, an emotionally repressed high school teacher, and befriends Ginny, a young, uneducated girl with loose morals.

Frank Sinatra was cast as David Hirsh, alongside Shirley MacLaine, Martha Hyer, and fellow Rat Pack member Dean Martin as Bama Dillert. Because of its potential as an Oscar contender, Minnelli was given six months to complete the film for its winter 1958 release. During filming in Madison, Indiana, Sinatra and Martin grew tired of Minnelli's meticulous shooting and walked off the film. Siegel however brought them back to finish the film.

Variety called Some Came Running "one of the most exciting pictures of the season" and wrote it "has been brilliantly directed by Vincente Minnelli with fine performances" from Sinatra, Martin, and MacLaine. Time magazine praised the first half but felt afterwards "there is nothing to hang around for except for occasional flickers of brilliant overacting by Shirley MacLaine, the chance to watch Frank Sinatra play Frank Sinatra, and the spectacle of Director Vincente Minnelli's talents dissolving in the general mess of the story, like sunlight in a slag heap." Competing against Gigi at the Academy Awards, Some Came Running garnered Best Supporting acting nominations for MacLaine, Hyer, and Arthur Kennedy.

=== 1959–1966: Last years at MGM ===
==== Home from the Hill ====
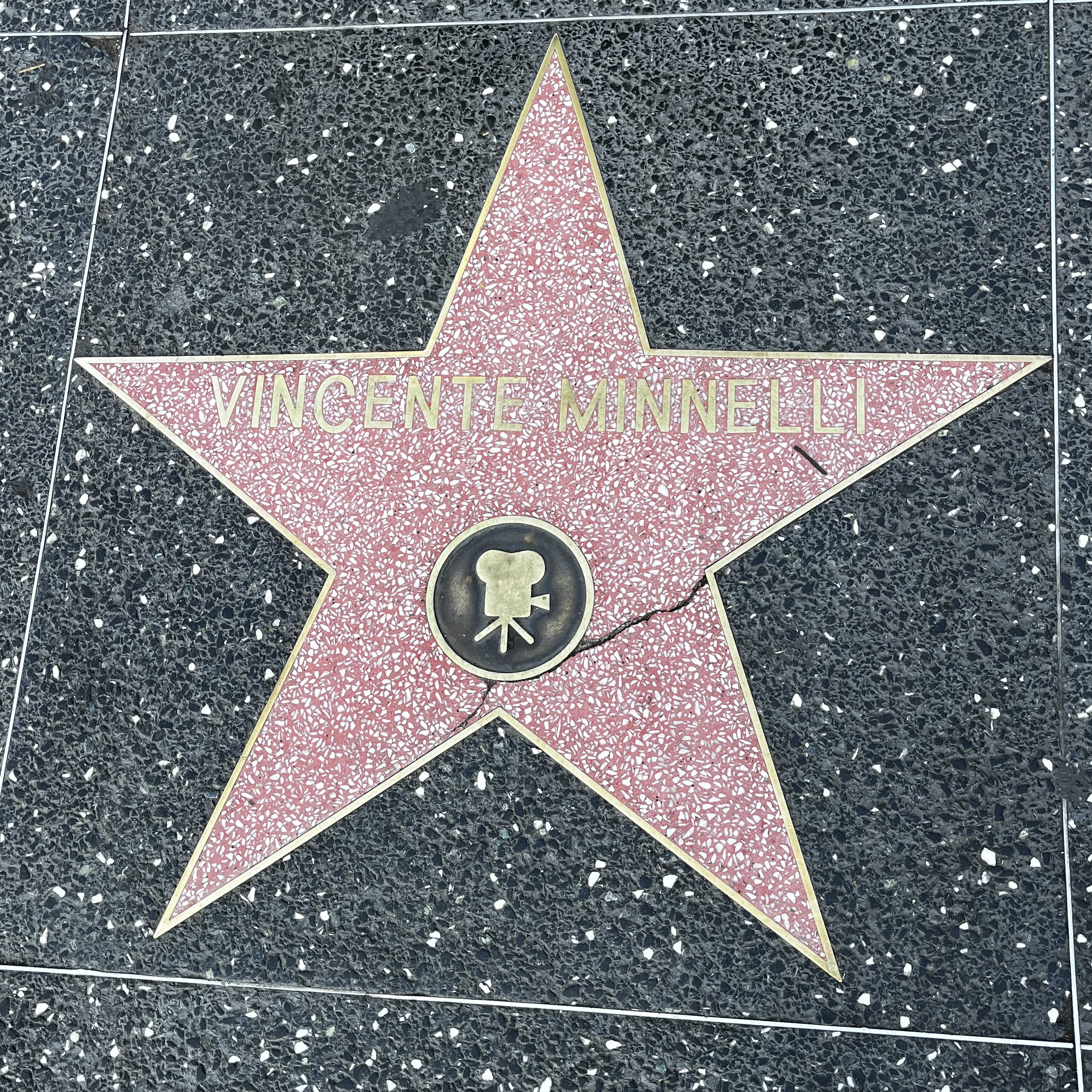
Vincente Minnelli's honorary star on the Hollywood Walk of Fame.

The dual success of Gigi and Some Came Running solidified Minnelli's tenureship as director for MGM. On February 8, 1960, Minnelli received a star on the Hollywood Walk of Fame for his contributions to the film industry. Overseas, his films had been acclaimed by French critics, some of whom published for the Cahiers du Cinéma film magazine. French critic Jacques Doniol-Valcroze wrote a lengthy critique for The Bad and the Beautiful (1952), as did Jean Douchet for Lust for Life (1956). Douchet and Jean Domarchi had written assessment essays on Minnelli's filmography and jointly interviewed him in 1962.

Home from the Hill (1960) was an adaptation of the 1958 novel of the same title by William Humphrey. It tells the story of a Texas family headed by patriarch Captain Wade Hunnicutt (Robert Mitchum), who is married to Hannah (Eleanor Parker), an embittered and sexually withdrawn wife, and the father to Theron (George Hamilton) and an illegitimate son Rafe (George Peppard).

The film was shot on location in Oxford, Mississippi; and Paris, Texas, followed by a month of filming on the MGM backlot. A review in Variety called the film a "powerful and absorbing story, and its production has the added interest of creating a vital and promising young star, George Peppard."

==== Bells Are Ringing ====
In 1958, Arthur Freed purchased the film rights to the Broadway musical Bells Are Ringing, with its book and lyrics written by Betty Comden and Adolph Green and music by Jule Styne. Comden and Green were hired to adapt the musical into a screenplay with instructions that the script be no longer than 110 pages and delivered by December 31, 1958. Comden and Green met the deadline but delivered a 159-page script, which Minnelli felt was too long. Filming was delayed twice until the script was ready. Judy Holliday reprised her Broadway role as Ella Peterson, a switchboard operator who listens in on the lives of private clients. She involves herself with playwright Jeffrey Moss (Dean Martin), and falls in love with him. Filming began on October 7, 1959, and lasted until December 24. Throughout filming, Holliday held creative differences with Minnelli as she disliked the script and his cinematic approach to the film.

Larry Tubelle of Variety felt the musical adaptation was "ideally suited to the intimacy of the film medium" and complimented Freed for remaining "faithful to the buoyant spirit and whimsical personality of the original"; Minnelli's direction was praised as inserting "spirit and snap into the musical sequences[,] warmth and humor into the straight passages and manages to knit it all together without any traces of awkwardness in transition". A review in Time magazine praised Holliday for her "showmanly style" while noting Minnelli "manages to jog and jazz and jigger a merely middling book and some fairly forgettable tunes into one of the year's liveliest and wittiest cinemusicals." By January 1961, Bells Are Ringing had earned $2.8 million in anticipated box office rentals from the United States and Canada.

==== Four Horsemen of the Apocalypse ====
While promoting Home from the Hill (1960), Minnelli was informed he was to direct a remake of the 1921 silent film The Four Horsemen of the Apocalypse. For the 1962 remake, the script was to occur during World War II although it retained the events culminating in World War I. Minnelli disagreed with this change; while John Gay was hired for rewrites, the revised script retained the updated setting.

For the lead role, Minnelli had wanted French actor Alain Delon but Sol Siegel disagreed. Glenn Ford was cast instead after he had signed a new multi-picture contract with MGM. As typical with Minnelli's films, the film was shot in Paris with interior scenes filmed in California. Shot from October 1960 to March 1961, it was scheduled for release by winter 1961; however, reshoots were done during the summer.

Postponed for release in February 1962, the film received criticism for its script and production values. It earned $2 million in distributor rentals against its $7 million production budget. Overseas, the film was appreciated by European critics and said to have influenced Bernardo Bertolucci's The Conformist (1970) and Vittorio De Sica's The Garden of the Finzi-Continis (1970).

==== Two Weeks in Another Town ====
In 1960, MGM purchased the film rights to Irwin Shaw's novel Two Weeks in Another Town for $55,000. John Houseman was appointed producer and approached Minnelli to direct. Minnelli recognized the novel's similarities to The Bad and the Beautiful (1952) and hired that film's screenwriter Charles Schnee and composer David Raksin. The story tells of Jack Andrus, a washed-up actor, who arrives in Rome to help his old mentor Maurice Kruger and supervise the dubbing of his latest film. Minnelli offered the lead role to Kirk Douglas, while Edward G. Robinson and Cyd Charisse portrayed Kruger and Carlotta, Jack's ex-wife, respectively. Filming began in October 1961 in Rome with a scheduled nineteen-day on-location shoot. However, Minnelli did not finish until a month later. Filming resumed on the MGM backlot for eleven weeks, starting on November 9.

Minnelli had shot an orgy sequence, which infuriated MGM head Joseph Vogel. In spring 1962, the film received poor test responses during sneak previews. Siegel was replaced by Robert Weitman as production head, while Vogel appointed studio editor Margaret Booth to drastically re-edit the film. The orgy sequence was condensed while Charisse's ending monologue was also removed. Minnelli and Houseman were not consulted during most of the film's post-production. The film was released without fanfare and was another box office failure.

By 1962, MGM was in financial turmoil due to severe commercial flops, including Cimarron (1960), Mutiny on the Bounty (1962), and Minnelli's own Four Horsemen of the Apocalypse (1962). This, along with the re-editing of Two Weeks in Another Town (1962), fractured Minnelli's relationship with MGM. His contract with the studio was up for renewal. He formed his own production company, Venice Productions, to increase his bargaining power, and negotiated to earn 25 percent of any net box office profits, in addition to his salary as director, as well as retain final cut privilege through second previews. In April 1962, MGM and Venice Productions agreed to co-produce six films over four years.

==== The Courtship of Eddie's Father ====
Under his new contract, Minnelli directed The Courtship of Eddie's Father (1963), having found the 1961 novel about a young son wanting his widowed father to remarry to be "warm and winning." The film's producer, Joe Pasternak, cast Glenn Ford and Ron Howard as the father and son respectively. Released in 1963, film critics found the film sentimental and mildly engaging. It earned $2 million in distributor rentals.

Minnelli's next project was meant to be My Fair Lady (1964), but Warner Bros. had outbid MGM for the film rights at $5.5 million. Alan Jay Lerner and Frederick Loewe pleaded with Jack Warner to hire Minnelli as director, but negotiations broke down due to salary disagreements; Warner instead hired George Cukor.

==== Goodbye Charlie ====
For most of 1963, Minnelli was without a film project. MGM allowed him to accept outside directing jobs. In 1964, producer Arthur P. Jacobs asked Minnelli to direct a musical adaptation of the novel Goodbye, Mr. Chips with Rex Harrison in mind for the title role. Minnelli declined that offer, but he accepted Twentieth Century Fox's offer to direct Goodbye Charlie (1964) starring Tony Curtis and Debbie Reynolds. This was his first film produced outside of MGM. Adapted from George Axelrod's 1959 play, the story involves Charlie Sorrel, a womanizer who is shot by a jealous husband and returns to Earth reincarnated as a beautiful blonde. As a woman, Charlie meets with his friend George Tracy (Curtis) to consult about her new identity. Pre-production and filming lasted from January to July 1964 on Fox's studio backlot with location shoots in Malibu, California.

Released in November 1964, it received mixed reviews from film critics, with Bosley Crowther stating that "Debbie Reynolds and Tony Curtis [are] so sadly cast in distasteful roles that it causes even a hardened moviegoer to turn away from it in pain and shame." By January 1966, the film had earned $3.7 million in distributor rentals from the United States and Canada.

==== The Sandpiper ====
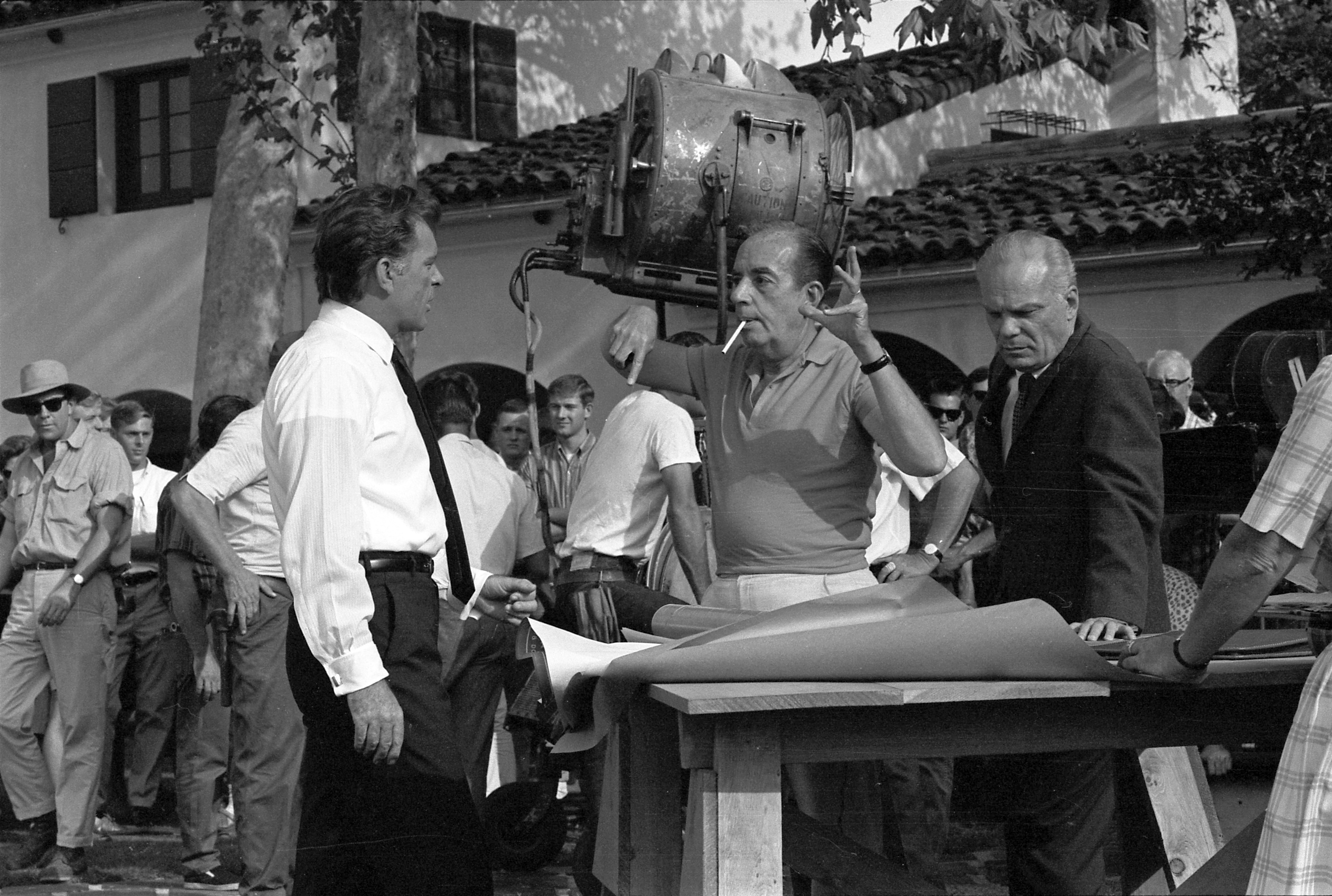
Richard Burton (left) talking with Minnelli (with cigarette) while filming The Sandpiper

Minnelli returned to MGM to direct The Sandpiper (1965) starring Elizabeth Taylor and Richard Burton. Intended as a vehicle for the star couple, Martin Ransohoff devised an original story of a love affair between a married Episcopalian minister and a free-spirited single mother. The couple first turned to William Wyler, but he declined the offer. Taylor and Burton then asked Minnelli, who had previously directed Taylor in Father of the Bride (1950) and Father's Little Dividend (1951). Minnelli needed a commercially successful film and accepted the offer. The film was shot on location in Big Sur, California before filming in Paris.

The film was released in 1965 and was a box office success earning $6.4 million in distributor rentals. This was the last film produced under the MGM–Venice Productions deal. While the films were moderately successful, they failed to generate enough profit.

By November 1966, Minnelli's contract with MGM had lapsed by mutual consent, though the studio allowed Minnelli to develop Say It With Music, a biographical film about Irving Berlin. For three years, Minnelli and Arthur Freed had struggled to move the project into production, with various drafts by George Wells, Arthur Laurents, Leonard Gershe, and Betty Comden and Adolph Green. Frank Sinatra and Julie Andrews were considered for the lead roles, but internal politics within MGM halted any progress. Dismayed, Minnelli left MGM after 26 years, and Freed retired soon after. Blake Edwards inherited the project, but MGM president James Aubrey shut it down by 1969.

=== 1967–1976: Later years ===
==== On a Clear Day You Can See Forever ====
According to film historian Mark Harris, Minnelli agreed to direct Doctor Dolittle (1967), which would have reunited him with Harrison and Alan Jay Lerner. The film was tentatively scheduled for a Christmas 1966 release, but Minnelli left the project and was replaced by Richard Fleischer.

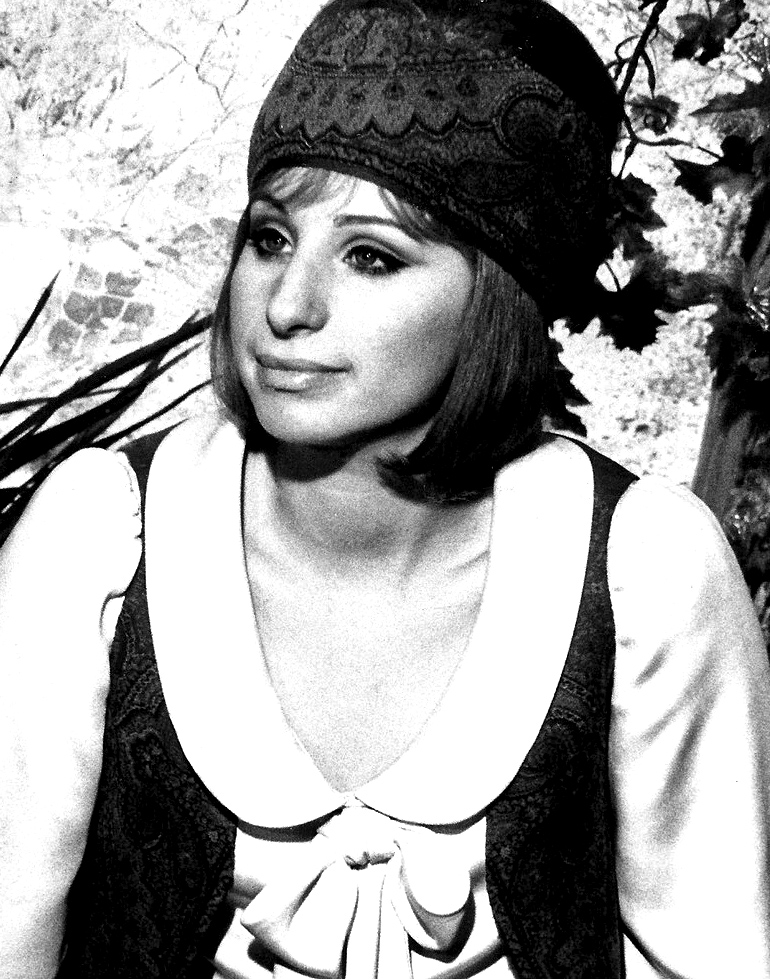
Barbra Streisand as Daisy Gamble in On a Clear Day You Can See Forever

Lerner's then-latest Broadway musical On a Clear Day You Can See Forever was optioned by Paramount Pictures, with Barbra Streisand considered for the lead role. After Minnelli was not hired for My Fair Lady (1964), Lerner successfully campaigned to have Minnelli direct the adaptation of Clear Day. Filming began on January 6, 1969 for an intended 82-day shoot. The film was originally scheduled for a fall 1970 roadshow release, but after 1969's Hello, Dolly! (which also starred Streisand) disappointed at the box office, the film's release was pushed up to the summer. Fifteen minutes were removed from the film's run time.

Released in June 1970, the film received decent reviews from film critics. Charles Champlin of the Los Angeles Times wrote the film "is just about as good as it could be. It is bright, it is romantic, it is solidly produced, it centers on an expertly comedic performance by Barbra Streisand and a charming if remarkably unpersuasive turn by Yves Montand as a psychiatrist, it is inventive, it is innocent." By January 1971, the film had earned $4.75 million in box office rentals in the United States and Canada.

==== A Matter of Time ====
Minnelli then turned to a film project which would star his daughter Liza Minnelli, who had been nominated for an Academy Award for Best Actress for The Sterile Cuckoo (1969). They brainstormed a biographical film of Zelda Fitzgerald, but it failed to proceed after discussions with Paramount Pictures president Frank Yablans. Minnelli concurrently began developing a biographical film of Bessie Smith with Tina Turner in mind, but it fell through.

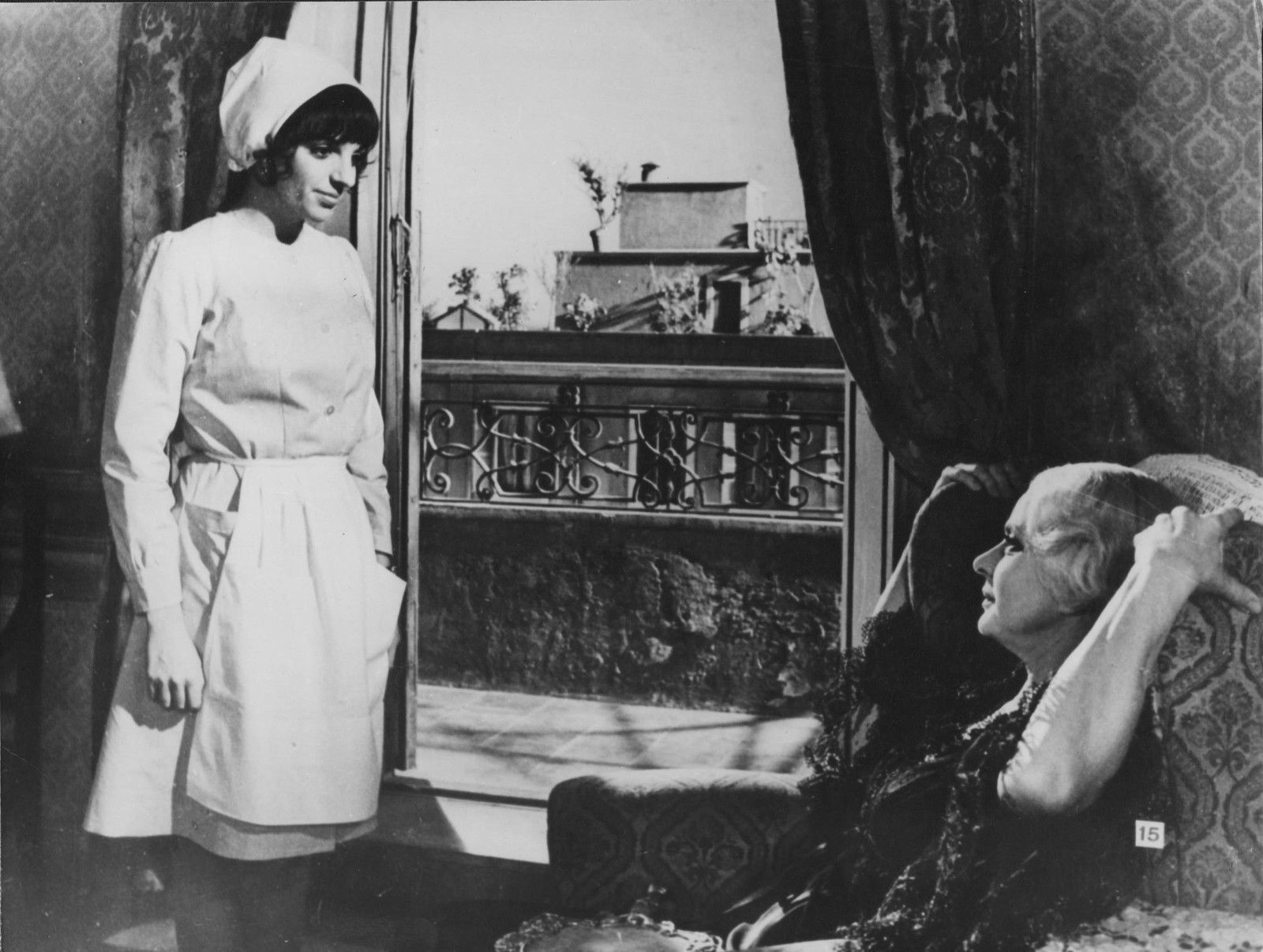
Liza Minnelli and Ingrid Bergman in A Matter of Time (1976)

In 1974, Minnelli became interested in adapting Maurice Druon's 1954 novel The Film of Memory (La Volupté d'être). Retitled A Matter of Time (1976), it tells of a financially distressed contessa who tutors a young chambermaid. He turned to veteran collaborators, including screenwriter John Gay and producer Edmund Grainger. After several major studios declined, American International Pictures (AIP) agreed to finance the film with a $5 million production budget. Ingrid Bergman, who had won her third Academy Award for Murder on the Orient Express (1974), was cast as the Contessa.

Filming began in August 1975 in Rome and Venice for a 14-week shoot. However, filming lasted 20 weeks due to harsh winter conditions, labor strikes, and mandated shorter production hours. Minnelli's first assembly cut was over three hours. AIP president Samuel Z. Arkoff subsequently wrestled control of the film away from Minnelli, deleting several flashbacks and restructuring the film entirely. Alarmed by the news, Martin Scorsese had a petition signed by several prominent Hollywood directors, protesting Arkoff's treatment of Minnelli. Flattered by the support, Minnelli nevertheless had to wash his hands of the film. It premiered at the Radio City Music Hall on October 7, 1976 but was a financial disappointment.

== Personal life ==
=== Marriages ===
Minnelli first met Judy Garland in 1940 during the filming of Strike Up the Band. They married on June 15, 1945, in Garland's mother's house in Wilshire, Los Angeles. They had one child, Liza May Minnelli. The marriage fractured during the filming for The Pirate (1948). In 1949, Minnelli and Garland temporarily separated. On June 16, 1950, MGM suspended Garland; three days later, Garland attempted suicide by puncturing her throat with a piece of glass. On December 7, they announced their legal separation and intent to divorce. The divorce was finalized on March 29, 1951 with Garland retaining parental custody of Liza.

Minnelli's second marriage was to Georgette Magnani, the sister of Miss Universe 1953 Christiane Martel. After winning Miss Universe, Christiane was offered an acting contract with Universal Pictures and Georgette was assigned by their parents to chaperone her. At a Hollywood party, Vernon Duke introduced Minnelli to Georgette. Smitten by her appearance, Minnelli offered Georgette a screen test, which she turned down. Minnelli later wrote in his 1974 memoir: "She didn't understand the Hollywood pecking order, and even if she had, Georgette wasn't outgoing and socially ambitious."

Minnelli married Magnani on February 16, 1954, while he was directing Brigadoon. The couple had one child, Christiane Nina Minnelli. During his marriage, Minnelli was constantly preoccupied with various film projects, which left him conspicuously absent from his wife. Minnelli acknowledged, "Working day after day, long into the night, cut drastically into our domestic life." During post-production on Gigi (1958), Magnani filed for a legal separation, in which she accused Minnelli of "mental cruelty". When the divorce was finalized, she was awarded custody of their daughter.

During his 1960 vacation in Italy, Minnelli met Danica ("Denise") Radosavljević Gay Giulianelli de Gigante, a Yugoslavian-born divorcée. She accompanied him during the filming of Four Horsemen of the Apocalypse, and they were married in January 1962. Minnelli and Denise co-founded a production company, Venice Productions, partnering with MGM on a new contract to produce six films over four years. Around 1970, Minnelli heard rumors that Denise was having adulterous affairs. She dismissed the rumors, but the couple divorced in August 1971.

Minnelli's third wife, Denise, met British publicist Margaretta Lee Anderson sometime during the 1960s, and they became close friends. After she had divorced Minnelli, Denise encouraged Anderson to move in with him. At this point, Minnelli vowed never to marry again after his third divorce. Nevertheless, on April 2, 1980, Minnelli married Anderson. They remained together until his death in 1986.

=== Sexual orientation ===
For years, there was speculation in the entertainment community that Minnelli was gay or bisexual. Minnelli biographer Emanuel Levy stated that Minnelli lived freely as a gay man in public in New York, but in Hollywood that was impossible. According to Levy: "He was openly gay in New York – we were able to document names of companions and stories from Dorothy Parker. But when he came to Hollywood, I think he made the decision to repress that part of himself or to become bisexual." Lester Gaba, a retail display designer who knew Minnelli in New York, was reported to have frequently claimed to have had an affair with Minnelli, although the same person who related Gaba's claim also admitted that Gaba "was known to embellish quite a bit."

=== Death ===
Minnelli had a pacemaker implanted on Christmas 1982.

On July 25, 1986, he died in his Beverly Hills home, aged 83, from emphysema and pneumonia, which had caused him to be repeatedly hospitalized in his final year. He is interred in Forest Lawn Memorial Park in Glendale, California.

Minnelli's estate was valued at slightly over US$1.1 million. He left $100,000 to his widow, Lee; $5000 to his second daughter, Christiane (whom, he said in his will, he believed to be financially secure); and the remainder, including his Beverly Hills home, to his first daughter, Liza. However, he requested in his will that Liza allow Lee to continue living in that home.

== Legacy ==
=== Perception as an auteur ===
Despite his varied filmography of musicals, comedies and melodramas, Minnelli has been criticized as being a decorative artist rather than an auteur filmmaker, elevating artistic imagery while distracting audiences from the narrative and dialogue with elaborate camera angles. In his 1968 book The American Cinema, Andrew Sarris called Minnelli a "pure stylist" who "believes more in beauty than in art." Sarris further wrote: "Minnelli has always required relatively luxurious projects upon which to lavish his taste. If he has a fatal flaw as an artist, it is his naϊve belief that style can invariably transcend substance and that our way of looking at the world is more important than the world itself." In 1975, Richard Schickel wrote Minnelli is "not by nature a storyteller. He does not have a very good eye—or memory—for revealing anecdotes. Nor does he have an analytical turn of mind. He seems mainly to feel his way toward the solution of creative problems, clued more by visual ideas (and of course, musical ones) than by any of the signs one might term 'literary.'"

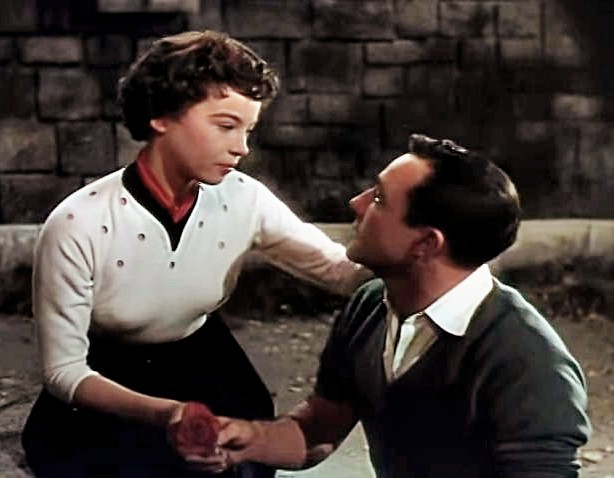
Leslie Caron and Gene Kelly in An American in Paris (1951). Minnelli's films often centered around creative individuals, exploring their innate talents as well as their moral and professional fears.

Emmanuel Levy sharply disagreed, writing Minnelli was "an auteur in thematic, stylistic, and ideological terms. His films demonstrate vividly that concepts of art and artificiality run throughout his work." In 1959, Albert Johnson, in an article for Film Quarterly, called Minnelli "a master of the decorative image," belonging "neither to the old school nor to the new, but remains in a special position of accomplishment, one which permits all spheres of the visual and decorative arts to embellish his films." In a foreword to Minnelli's memoir I Remember It Well, Alan Jay Lerner (of Lerner and Loewe) called Minnelli "the greatest director of motion picture musicals the screen has ever seen." Film historian Jeanine Basinger called Minnelli "a visual artist. His films have wit and charm and beauty, but they also have cinematic style. His ability just to decorate, make everything in the frame look right, look beautiful, look appropriate and complementary to other things inside it, was unparalleled. He was one of the few directors who could develop his own personal vision in musicals, a difficult genre for a director because there is no more collaborative genre, none more dependent on the talents of so many others to succeed."

Stanley Donen, a contemporary of Minnelli's and fellow director of musical films, once criticized Minnelli's musicals for their "sloppy" stories, and adopted a more bold, no-nonsense, and realistic style compared to Minnelli's impressionist visual style. Stephen M. Silverman also distinguished both filmmakers' camerawork, observing Minnelli tends to track forward or backwards while Donen frequently uses horizontal tracking and crane shots to support the story and choreography. On the contrary, Minnelli did not mind interrupting the stories for a grand and visual performance. Michael Kidd, a choreographer for MGM's most noted musicals, stated he preferred collaborating with Donen to Minnelli. He stated, "Vincente was a difficult person to communicate with. He was not very articulate, he would leave sentences unfinished. He had a great love of the visual aspects of moviemaking—he was originally a set designer, and people used to complain all the time, 'He shoots the scenery'—but Vincente was not one to engage in collaborative work."

In 2012, film historian Ronald Bergan contrastingly wrote: "What distinguished Minnelli from most of the other directors on the MGM roster was his mise-en-scène – his elegant compositions within an individual frame – the relation of objects and people, the interplay of light and dark, the pattern of colour." Joseph Andrew Casper noted Minnelli's metteur en scène as "essentially expressionistic" by which he uses decor to create "a spatial-temporal continuum, albeit researched and dramatically related, filtered through the director's spirit. As such, one gets the distillation or the essence of a place and period imbibing attitudes and feelings ... Minnelli holds no mirror up to nature but places a lamp next to it. His is the recreative rather than the mimetic tradition of art." Basinger agreed: "His filmed universe was one of fantasy and reality mixed, of dreams and deceptions, and of a decor that is always carefully researched, designed, and executed with the purpose not only of being rewarding in and of itself, but also of defining character and setting."

=== Approach with actors ===
Throughout his career, Minnelli directed seven different actors in Oscar-nominated performances: Spencer Tracy, Gloria Grahame, Kirk Douglas, Anthony Quinn, Arthur Kennedy, Shirley MacLaine, and Martha Hyer. Grahame and Quinn were the two to win. Despite this, Minnelli is often perceived as not emphasizing enough of the actors' performances in his films. During filming for Some Came Running (1959), Minnelli spent hours setting up a single shot because he wanted a Ferris wheel in the background, or a vase to hold the right kind of flowers. Frank Sinatra and Dean Martin both grew frustrated with multiple takes for a brief scene, and stormed off the set. Shirley MacLaine, who co-starred in the film, remembered: "For me, Vincente Minnelli was a great director, simply because he didn't direct much. He 'let' us actors find our own characters and our way. Dean thrived on the freedom he felt with Vincente—one reason his character of Bama was the finest of his career. But Frank [Sinatra] was threatened by this way of working because the freedom of choice exposed him too much."

George Peppard, an alumnus of the Actors Studio, clashed with Minnelli during filming for Home from the Hill (1960). During one take of the last scene, Minnelli told Peppard: "George, you might be a seething volcano inside. But I've got news for you. Nothing's happening. You'll have to do it my way." Shirley Jones, who co-starred in 1963's The Courtship of Eddie's Father, recalled Minnelli never gave her specific directions for her character during filming. She stated, "Vincente liked to draw pretty pictures with the camera, and it was always for me to move to a certain point, put my hand here when I say this line but never any direction about character, and I missed that."

== Stage credits ==
Title	Run(s)	Theatre	Director	Set designer	Costume designer	Sketches
Earl Carroll's Vanities of 1930	July 1, 1930 – January 3, 1931	New Amsterdam Theatre			Yes	
Earl Carroll's Vanities of 1931	August 27, 1931 – April 9, 1932	44th Street Theatre		Yes	Yes	
Earl Carroll's Vanities of 1932	September 27, 1932 – December 10, 1932	Broadway Theatre (53rd Street)		Yes	Yes	
The DuBarry	November 22, 1932 – February 4, 1933	George M. Cohan's Theatre		Yes	Yes	
At Home Abroad	September 19, 1935 – March 7, 1936	Winter Garden Theatre	Yes	Yes		
Ziegfeld Follies of 1936	1. January 30, 1936 – May 9, 1936; 2. September 14, 1936 – December 19, 1936	Winter Garden Theatre		Yes	Yes	
The Show is On	1. December 25, 1936 – July 17, 1937; 2. September 18, 1937 – October 2, 1937	Winter Garden Theatre	Yes	Yes		
Hooray for What!	December 1, 1937 – May 21, 1938	Winter Garden Theatre	Yes	Yes		
Very Warm for May	November 17, 1939 – January 6, 1940	Alvin Theatre	Yes	Yes		
Dance Me a Song	January 20, 1950 – February 18, 1950	Royale Theatre				Yes
Mata Hari	November 20, 1967 – December 9, 1967	National Theatre (Washington, D.C.)	Yes			

== Filmography ==
Year	Title	Studio	Genre	Notes
1943	Cabin in the Sky	Metro-Goldwyn-Mayer	Musical	
1943	I Dood It	Metro-Goldwyn-Mayer	Musical comedy	
1943	Thousands Cheer	Metro-Goldwyn-Mayer	Musical comedy	"Honeysuckle Rose" segment
1944	Meet Me in St. Louis	Metro-Goldwyn-Mayer	Musical	
1945	The Clock	Metro-Goldwyn-Mayer	Romantic drama	
1945	Ziegfeld Follies	Metro-Goldwyn-Mayer	Musical comedy	Primary director
1945	Yolanda and the Thief	Metro-Goldwyn-Mayer	Musical comedy	
1946	Undercurrent	Metro-Goldwyn-Mayer	Film noir	
1948	The Pirate	Metro-Goldwyn-Mayer	Musical	
1949	Madame Bovary	Metro-Goldwyn-Mayer	Romantic drama	
1950	Father of the Bride	Metro-Goldwyn-Mayer	Comedy	
1951	Father's Little Dividend	Metro-Goldwyn-Mayer	Comedy	
1951	An American in Paris	Metro-Goldwyn-Mayer	Musical	
1952	The Bad and the Beautiful	Metro-Goldwyn-Mayer	Melodrama	
1953	The Story of Three Loves	Metro-Goldwyn-Mayer	Anthology	"Mademoiselle" segment
1953	The Band Wagon	Metro-Goldwyn-Mayer	Musical comedy	
1954	The Long, Long Trailer	Metro-Goldwyn-Mayer	Comedy	
1954	Brigadoon	Metro-Goldwyn-Mayer	Musical	
1955	The Cobweb	Metro-Goldwyn-Mayer	Drama	
1955	Kismet	Metro-Goldwyn-Mayer	Musical comedy	
1956	Lust for Life	Metro-Goldwyn-Mayer	Biography	
1956	Tea and Sympathy	Metro-Goldwyn-Mayer	Drama	
1957	Designing Woman	Metro-Goldwyn-Mayer	Romantic comedy	
1957	The Seventh Sin	Metro-Goldwyn-Mayer	Drama	Uncredited
1958	Gigi	Metro-Goldwyn-Mayer	Musical romantic comedy	
1958	The Reluctant Debutante	Metro-Goldwyn-Mayer	Comedy	
1958	Some Came Running	Metro-Goldwyn-Mayer	Drama	
1960	Home from the Hill	Metro-Goldwyn-Mayer	Drama	
1960	Bells Are Ringing	Metro-Goldwyn-Mayer	Musical romantic comedy	
1962	The Four Horsemen of the Apocalypse	Metro-Goldwyn-Mayer	Drama	
1962	Two Weeks in Another Town	Metro-Goldwyn-Mayer	Drama	
1963	The Courtship of Eddie's Father	Metro-Goldwyn-Mayer	Romantic comedy	
1964	Goodbye Charlie	20th Century Fox	Comedy	
1965	The Sandpiper	Metro-Goldwyn-Mayer	Drama	
1970	On a Clear Day You Can See Forever	Paramount Pictures	Musical comedy drama	
1976	A Matter of Time	American International Pictures	Musical fantasy	Minnelli later disowned this film.

== Awards and honors ==
=== Academy Awards ===
==== To Minnelli ====
Award year	Film	Award	Result
1952	An American in Paris	Best Director	Nominated
1959	Gigi	Best Director	Won

==== To films directed by Minnelli ====
Award year	Film	Award	Result
1951	Father of the Bride	Best Picture	Nominated
1952	An American in Paris	Best Picture	Won
1959	Gigi	Best Picture	Won

==== To performers directed by Minnelli ====
Award year	Film	Performer	Award	Result
1951	Father of the Bride	Spencer Tracy	Best Actor	Nominated
1953	The Bad and the Beautiful	Kirk Douglas	Best Actor	Nominated
1953	The Bad and the Beautiful	Gloria Grahame	Best Supporting Actress	Won
1957	Lust for Life	Kirk Douglas	Best Actor	Nominated
1957	Lust for Life	Anthony Quinn	Best Supporting Actor	Won
1959	Some Came Running	Shirley MacLaine	Best Actress	Nominated
1959	Some Came Running	Arthur Kennedy	Best Supporting Actor	Nominated
1959	Some Came Running	Martha Hyer	Best Supporting Actress	Nominated

=== Films inducted into the National Film Registry ===
Film	Year released	Year inducted
Cabin in the Sky	1943	2020
Meet Me in St. Louis	1944	1994
An American in Paris	1951	1993
The Bad and the Beautiful	1952	2003
The Band Wagon	1953	1995
Gigi	1958	1991

These films are listed on the National Film Registry website.
