= Home from the Hill (film) =

1960 film by Vincente Minnelli

- Theatrical release poster
- Directed by: Vincente Minnelli
- Screenplay by: Harriet Frank Jr. Irving Ravetch
- Based on: Home from the Hill; 1958 novel by William Humphrey
- Produced by: Edmund Grainger
- Starring: Robert Mitchum; Eleanor Parker; George Peppard; George Hamilton; Everett Sloane
- Cinematography: Milton Krasner
- Edited by: Harold F. Kress
- Music by: Bronislau Kaper
- Distributed by: Metro-Goldwyn-Mayer
- Release date: March 3, 1960 (US)
- Running time: 150 minutes
- Country: United States
- Language: English
- Budget: $2,354,000
- Box office: $5,075,000

Home from the Hill is a 1960 American melodrama Western film starring Robert Mitchum, Eleanor Parker, George Peppard, George Hamilton, Everett Sloane and Luana Patten. Directed by Vincente Minnelli and filmed in Metrocolor and CinemaScope, it was produced by Edward Grainger, and distributed by MGM. The screenplay was adapted from the 1958 novel Home from the Hill by William Humphrey. The film was entered into the 1960 Cannes Film Festival. The title is from the last line of Robert Louis Stevenson's short poem "Requiem".

== Plot ==
Captain Wade Hunnicutt, a notorious womanizer and the wealthiest and most powerful person in his East Texas town, is wounded by a jealous husband. Wade's scornful but beautiful wife Hannah has raised their son Theron to be dependent upon her, but as he reaches adulthood his father seeks to help Theron become a man.

Wade introduces Theron to hunting and other masculine pursuits under the watchful eye of Rafe, Hunnicutt's loyal employee. Theron admires the slightly older and self-reliant Rafe, and rapidly develops into a marksman and skilled hunter. He also learns about women from Rafe.

Theron's new lifestyle leads him into a love affair with Libby Halstead, a local girl from a proper family, but her father Albert's animosity forces a secret relationship. Theron learns from his mother that the reason for Libby's father's scorn is Wade's reputation as a womanizer, that Rafe is his illegitimate half-brother, and that his parents have not been intimate since before he was born.

Theron becomes disturbed by his parents' dysfunctional relationship and his father's treatment of Rafe. Theron rejects his parents as well as the concept of family, and thus Libby, his true love. Though Theron does not know, Libby is pregnant, but she does not want her pregnancy to be the reason for their marriage. Confused and despondent, Libby turns to Rafe, who out of attraction and compassion agrees to marry her. Realizing his error, Theron is devastated.

On the day of Libby's newborn son's baptism, her father, Albert, overhears gossip that Captain Hunnicutt fathered the child. Albert is enraged. Wade and Hannah seek to reconcile after 17 years for Theron's benefit. After Hannah leaves the room, Wade is shot down by an unknown assailant who escapes. Theron tracks down his father's murderer and sees that it is Albert. Theron kills Albert in self-defense and soon after Rafe catches up. Though Rafe objects, Theron leaves town, promising never to return.

Several months later, Rafe encounters Hannah at Wade's grave. He offers to let her live with him and Libby, and to include her in the life of her grandson, and she shows him that she has acknowledged him as Wade's son on the headstone.

== Cast ==
- Robert Mitchum as Capt. Wade Hunnicutt
- Eleanor Parker as Hannah Hunnicutt
- George Peppard as Raphael 'Rafe' Copley
- George Hamilton as Theron Hunnicutt
- Everett Sloane as Albert Halstead
- Luana Patten as Elizabeth 'Libby' Halstead
- Anne Seymour as Sarah Halstead
- Constance Ford as Opal Bixby
- Ken Renard as Chauncey (Hunnicutt butler)
- Ray Teal as Dr. Reuben Carson

== Production ==
George Hamilton was cast after MGM executives were impressed by his performance in Crime and Punishment U.S.A.. He later said: "What Vincente later told me he saw in me was not my tortured soul but that I had the quality of a privileged but sensitive mama's boy."

Husband-and-wife team Harriet Frank Jr. and Irving Ravetch wrote the screenplay, making some key changes in Humphrey's story to emphasize the core conflicts. They created the role of Mitchum's illegitimate son and made his wife a desirable though bitter woman instead of the aging crone from the book. The writers also tried to capture the cadence of Southern speech and had written another family drama located in the South, The Long, Hot Summer. Minnelli would later call the screenplay "one of the few film scripts in which I didn't change a word."

This film was originally intended for Clark Gable and Bette Davis, but the roles then went to Robert Mitchum and Eleanor Parker.

== Filming location ==
Despite being set in Clarksville, Texas, few scenes were filmed there, though the opening scene shows a hearse driving around Clarksville's downtown square as old men are seen sitting, and whittling pieces of wood, at the base of a monument in the center of the square. Filming took place in Oxford, Mississippi near the University of Mississippi campus, and Paris, Texas and its surrounding area. The homes used in the film, particularly for the interior shots, are in Oxford, as is the downtown area. Some hunting scenes were filmed near Lake Crook, the Paris water supply. Other scenes were filmed south of Cuthand, Texas in Red River County. Remnants of the steel truss bridge seen in the film still exist near the Sulfur River crossing between Titus and Red River counties.

== Reception ==
=== Critical ===
In a contemporary review, New York Times critic Bosley Crowther wrote that the film lacked focus and that "... the whole thing is aimless, tedious and in conspicuously doubtful taste. Under Vicente Minnelli's direction, it is garishly overplayed."

An April 1960 review in Spokane's The Spokesman-Review praised Mitchum's performance and the film overall: "Every man who ever fired a gun or sired a son will want to see 'Home From the Hill' ... It takes considerable wandering through the highways and byways of emotion to reach a satisfactory and, thank goodness, honorable conclusion."

For his work in Home from the Hill, Mitchum won his only major acting award when the National Board of Review named him Best Actor for his work in the film as well as in The Sundowners. Peppard was also named Best Supporting Actor for his performance.

The movie launched George Peppard as a movie star. According to Filmink "the script was written by Harriet Frank Jr. and Irving Ravetch, who specialised in horny southern family melodramas (The Long Hot Summer, The Sound and the Fury, Hud), many of which starred Paul Newman, and Peppard was getting “new Paul Newman” heat."

The film is often recognized as one of the great melodramas directed by Minnelli late in his career. In 2007 Dave Kehr cited Home from the Hill as a "superb example" of these celebrated melodramas, in which "Minnelli's characters don’t simply act out their discomfort with the roles they’ve been thrust into or the relationships they’ve chosen to endure, but project their feelings onto the visual and aural fabric of the film. Where Minnelli's musicals express emotions through song and dance, his melodramas express feeling through color (of which he was one of the medium's great masters) and set design."

=== Box office ===
According to MGM records, the film earned $3,275,000 in the U.S. and Canada and $1.8 million elsewhere, but because of its high production cost, it incurred a loss of $122,000.

== See also ==
- List of American films of 1960
- William Humphrey
