= William Humphrey (writer) =

American novelist, memoirist and short story writer (1924–1997)

William Humphrey (June 18, 1924 – August 20, 1997) was an American novelist, memoirist, short story writer, and author of literary sporting and nature stories. His published works, while still available in French translation, largely have been out of print until recently. Home from the Hill and The Ordways are available from LSU Press. In 2015, Open Road Media published the complete works of William Humphrey in digital form.

Of significant interest to readers of Humphrey are Wakeful Anguish, A Literary Biography of William Humphrey by Ashby Bland Crowder as well as Far From Home, Selected Letters of William Humphrey edited by Crowder, both available from Louisiana State University Press.

== Biography ==
William Humphrey was born on 18 June 1924 to Clarence and Nell (Varley) Humphrey in Clarksville, Texas. His parents were poor and uneducated, and they moved from house to house because they were unable to keep up with the rent. His father eventually owned and operated an auto repair shop in Clarksville. By the 1950s, Humphrey had escaped his origins: He was thought of as a member of the glittering literati of the northeast, and Vogue magazine featured him in its "gallery of international charmers among men", along with Marlon Brando, Sir Edmund Hillary, Leonard Bernstein, and John F. Kennedy. But Humphrey thought little of such "honors" and took no opportunity to capitalize on such chances at fame. He preferred to retreat to his desk and write, thinking any recognition should come from his writing. Unlike Truman Capote and Norman Mailer, and despite his profound desire to be remembered for his literary contributions, Humphrey made very little effort to promote himself.

The central event in Humphrey's childhood was the death of his father in a car wreck when the boy was 13. His memoir Farther Off from Heaven, published in 1977, is a moving account of this event's effect on him. He and his mother, Nell Varley Humphrey, moved to Dallas because there was no work for her in Clarksville. Humphrey attended Southern Methodist University and the University of Texas (perhaps at the Austin campus since his papers are archived in their library), but never graduated. He left Texas as soon as he could.

Humphrey moved to Chicago and then New York City with his play Ambassador Ben in hand to see if he could become a Broadway success. This was in 1945. The play never was performed and never published. Humphrey began to write stories and left New York City to write in Brewster, New York. There Humphrey worked on the farm belonging to Donald Peterson, the producer and director of The Ave Maria Hour on WMCA radio. Humphrey published The Last Husband and Other Stories, his first book of stories, in 1953.

Humphrey secured a teaching post at Bard College in Annandale-on-Hudson, New York in 1949, the same year he married Dorothy Feinman Cantine, a painter of considerable talent who had a daughter Toni. He taught at Bard until 1958 when the success of his first novel, Home from the Hill (1958), and its 1960 film adaptation, gave him enough money to quit teaching and devote himself to writing full-time.

== Career ==
Humphrey wrote 13 books, including five novels, collections of short stories and a memoir. His first novel, Home from the Hill, was made into a 1960 MGM film. While the movie betrays the original intent of the author, and Humphrey claimed never to have seen it, the sale of the movie rights enabled the struggling Humphrey family to pursue a literary life. His second novel, The Ordways, was reviewed by the 'New York Times as "Funny, vivid and moving, this is a fine piece of work and a delight to read," and was compared to the writings of William Faulkner and Mark Twain. His books received high praise when they were first published, even from fellow writers. He went on to publish a dozen more books.

Humphrey wrote fiction that addressed the Southern past. He once asserted, "I am a destroyer of myths. My whole work has shown the danger and falseness of myths..[especially] the myth of the South" ("Notes on the Orestia," 38; MS at Harry Ransom Humanities Research Center, University of Texas at Austin).

Home from the Hill (1958) is Humphrey's first and most famous novel. It is the story of the aristocratic Hunnicutt family, a holdover from the Old South. The family is fated to end in destruction and destroyed—because of a moral corruption at its core.

The novel Hostages to Fortune (1985) represents a return to the tragic mode. Humphrey's first novel set outside the South, it portrays a man named Ben Curtis on the day he reenters life after a two-year descent into darkness resulting from his son's suicide. His effort to understand why his son committed suicide leads to his own attempted suicide. Richard Lipez said of this novel:

"To pick up Humphrey's extraordinary new novel is to hold an embodiment of grief in your hands. The unrelenting anguish that suffuses this story [is] almost unbearable to behold. It is possible to get through it because the stark poetry of Humphrey's work is enthralling." (Newsweek)

His last book was September Song (1992), a collection of short stories about old age. The collection of Humphrey's letters, Far from Home (2008), provides enlightening analysis of his own works. They also display his relationship with other writers, including Katherine Anne Porter, Theodore Weiss, and Rust Hill.

Jonathan Yardley, writing in The Washington Post (issue of 5 July 1992), remarked of Humphrey:

"Minor, but interesting and admirable. It has been a long time since Humphrey has enjoyed a commercial success, but he has dedicated his life to his writing with a fidelity all too rare in a culture that encourages facile success and empty honor."

== Bibliography ==
Note: The titles are listed referencing the original hard cover publishers. All are now published in digital form by Open Road Media

Novels

- Home from the Hill. New York: Knopf, 1958.
- The Ordways. New York: Knopf, 1965.
- Proud Flesh. New York: Knopf, 1973.
- Hostages to Fortune. New York: Delacorte / Seymour Lawrence, 1984.
- No Resting Place. New York: Delacorte / Seymour Lawrence, 1989.

Short Story Collections

- The Last Husband and Other Stories. New York, Morrow, 1953.
- A Time and a Place. New York: Knopf, 1968.
- September Song. New York: Houghton Mifflin / Seymour Lawrence, 1992.

Non-Fiction

- The Spawning Run. New York: Knopf, 1970.
- Farther Off from Heaven. New York: Knopf, 1977. (memoir)
- Ah, Wilderness! The Frontier in American Literature. El Paso, Texas: Texas Western University Press, 1977.
- My Moby Dick. New York: Doubleday, 1978.
- Open Season : Sporting Adventures. New York: Delacorte / Seymour Lawrence, 1986.

.Further reading

- Mark Royden Winchell, William Humphrey, Boise State University, Boise, 1992.
- Bert Almon, William Humphrey: Destroyer of Myths, University of North Texas Press, Denton, 1998.
