= Home from the Hill (novel) =

1958 novel by William Humphrey

- Cover of first edition, published 1958
- Author: William Humphrey
- Language: English
- Published: 1958 Alfred A. Knopf, Inc.
- Publication place: United States
- Media type: Print
- Pages: 312 p.
- ISBN: 0807120677

Home from the Hill is the first novel by author William Humphrey, published in 1958. It was made into a film two years after its publication.
