= Flags of Our Fathers (soundtrack) =

Flags of Our Fathers (Original Motion Picture Soundtrack)

Film score by Clint Eastwood
- Released: October 17, 2006
- Recorded: Eastwood Scoring Stage, Warner Bros. Studios, Burbank, California
- Genre: Film score
- Length: 59:31
- Label: Milan
- Producer: Clint Eastwood

Clint Eastwood chronology
| Million Dollar Baby (2004) | Flags of Our Fathers (2006) | Grace Is Gone (2007) |

Flags of Our Fathers (Original Motion Picture Soundtrack) is the film score to the 2006 film Flags of Our Fathers directed, produced and scored by Clint Eastwood. The album was released under the Milan Records label on October 17, 2006, which featured Eastwood's score and source music from 18th and 19th century.

== Background and release ==
Clint Eastwood composed the film score to Flags of Our Fathers, in his third film as a composer after Mystic River (2003) and Million Dollar Baby (2004). The score was recorded at the Eastwood Scoring Stage in Warner Bros. Studios Burbank. Lennie Niehaus, who previously worked as composer on Eastwood's films, conducted and orchestrated the score.

The soundtrack was released under the Milan Records label on October 17, 2006. In May 2007, a double-disc album was released which contained music from another Eastwood-directorial Letters from Iwo Jima, serving as the companion piece to the first film, and scored by Clint's son Kyle Eastwood and Michael Stevens.

== Track listing ==
Standard edition
| No. | Title | Artist(s) | Length |
|---|---|---|---|
| 1. | "The Photograph" | | 0:55 |
| 2. | "I'll Walk Alone" | Dinah Shore | 2:44 |
| 3. | "Knock Knock" | Kyle Eastwood; Michael Stevens; Andrew McCormack; Graeme Flowers | 3:13 |
| 4. | "Wounded Marines" | | 4:38 |
| 5. | "The Thunderer" | John Philip Sousa | 2:47 |
| 6. | "Armada Arrives" | | 3:49 |
| 7. | "Goodbye Ira" | | 0:51 |
| 8. | "Symphony in G Minor, 3rd Movement" | Wolfgang Amadeus Mozart | 3:49 |
| 9. | "String Quartet Opus #6, 2nd Movement" | Joseph Haydn | 3:53 |
| 10. | "Inland Battle" | | 4:44 |
| 11. | "Flag Raising" | | 1:02 |
| 12. | "Any Bonds Today?" | Irving Berlin | 2:39 |
| 13. | "Summit Ridge Drive" | Artie Shaw and His Gramercy Five | 3:22 |
| 14. | "Vict'ry Polka" | Sammy Cahn; Jule Styne | 2:30 |
| 15. | "The Medals" | | 3:00 |
| 16. | "Platoon Swims" | | 3:14 |
| 17. | "Washington Post March" | John Philip Sousa | 2:39 |
| 18. | "Flags Theme" | | 3:21 |
| 19. | "End Titles Guitar" | | 1:56 |
| 20. | "End Titles" | | 4:25 |
| Total length: | | | 59:31 |

Deluxe edition
| No. | Title | Artist(s) | Length |
|---|---|---|---|
| 21. | "War Bonds at War" | Marine Corps Combat Recordings, Iwo Jima, March 1945) (bonus | 17:58 |
| Total length: | | | 77:31 |

== Reception ==
James Leonard of AllMusic called that "Eastwood's score is spare, severe, and almost unbearably intense" describing it "first-rate movie music from start to finish. Jim Santella of All About Jazz wrote "An extraordinary story requires thought-provoking music to match, and here it is." In contrast, Christian Clemmensen of Filmtracks wrote "Fans could only hope that if Eastwood continued to tackle large-scale cinematic dramas, he would eventually understand that every individual has his limits, and he is potentially (if not probably) damaging his own films by insisting upon scoring them himself."

Mike Brennan of Soundtrack.Net wrote "It is a shame that a film depicting such a heroic event in World War II has such an uninspiring score". Todd McCarthy of Variety called it a "spare, effective musical score." Kaya Savas of MovieWeb wrote "Clint Eastwood provides another simple score for the film, and while it works for some of his movies it usually doesn't. I was not fond of the score for Mystic River, but I loved Million Dollar Baby's score. This film needed a different sound, and Eastwood's simple keys on the piano only works well near the end of the film. While the action sequences have no music I do think that a more experienced composer could have done wonders for the film."

== Accolades ==
| Award | Category | Recipient | Result | Ref. |
|---|---|---|---|---|
| Satellite Awards | Best Original Score | Clint Eastwood | Nominated | |

== Personnel ==
Credits adapted from liner notes:

- Music composer and producer – Clint Eastwood
- Arrangements – Kyle Eastwood, Michael Stevens
- Recording and mixing – Bobby Fernandez
- Mastering – Christian Dwiggins
- Music preparation – Eric Stonerook Music
- Art direction – Jodi Tack
- Executive producer – Clint Eastwood, Rob Lorenz, Emmanuel Chamboredon, Ian Hierons

Orchestra

- Orchestrator and conductor – Lennie Niehaus
- Orchestra leader – Lennie Niehaus
- Orchestra contractor – Joyce Ryan
- Concertmaster – Bruce Dukov

Instruments

- Bass – Chris Kollgaard, Chuck Berghofer, Drew Dembowski, Ed Meares, Kenny Wild, Mike Valerio, Oscar Hidalgo
- Cello – Armen Ksajikian, Chris Ermacoff, Dane Little, Erika Duke Kirkpatrick, Larry Corbett, Matt Cooker, Roger Lebow, Rowena Hammill, Tim Landauer, Trevor Handy, Vanessa Freebairn Smith
- Clarinet – Gary Herbig, Joel Peskin, Larry Hughes, Phillip O'Connor
- Electronic valve instrument – Judd Miller
- Euphonium – Bill Reichenbach, Steve Holtman
- Guitar – Bruce Forman, Dennis Budimir
- Horn – Brad Warnaar, Brian O'Connor, David Duke, Joe Meyer, John Reynolds, Justin Hageman, Phillip Yao, Rick Todd
- Keyboards – Mike Lang
- Percussion – Alan Estes, Dan Greco, Don Williams, Emil Radocchia, Kim Edmundson
- Saxophone – Dan Higgins, Gene Cipriano, Jack Nimitz, Lanny Morgan
- Trombone – Andy Martin, Bill Watrous, Charlie Loper
- Trumpet – Jack Sheldon, Rick Baptist, Ron Stout, Warren Luening
- Tuba – Tommy Johnson, Norman Pearson
- Viola – Andrew Duckles, Carrie Holzman, Dan Neufeld, Danny Seidenberg, Darrin McCann, Janet Lakatos, Karie Prescott, Kazi Pitelka, Matt Funes, Pamela Goldsmith, Kato Roland, Sam Formicola, Shawn Mann, Vicki Miskolczy
- Violin – Amy Hershberger, Barbra Porter, Charles Bisharat, Claudia Parducci, Darius Campo, David Ewart, Debra Price, Gil Romero, Haim Shtrum, Horia Moroaica, Jackie Brand, Jennifer Levin, Katia Popov, Marc Sazer, Margaret Wooten, Mike Markman, Natalie Leggett, Olivia Tsui, Pat Johnson, Raphael Rishik, Razdan Kuyumjian, Robin Olson, Tiffany Yi Hu
