= Invictus (soundtrack) =

Invictus (Original Motion Picture Soundtrack)

Soundtrack album by Kyle Eastwood, Michael Stevens and Overtone
- Released: December 1, 2009
- Genres: Film score; Pop; a cappella; orchestral
- Length: 47:05
- Label: New Line
- Producer: Michael Stevens

Kyle Eastwood chronology
| Gran Torino (2008) | Invictus (2009) | Battlecreek (2017) |

Michael Stevens chronology
| Gran Torino (2008) | Invictus (2009) | 2036 Origin Unknown (2018) |

Invictus (Original Motion Picture Soundtrack) is the soundtrack album to the 2009 film Invictus directed by Clint Eastwood. The soundtrack was released through New Line Records on December 1, 2009, and featured original score composed by Kyle Eastwood and Michael Stevens, along with songs performed by the South African group Overtone.

== Background ==
The original score is composed by Clint's son Kyle Eastwood, who associated with his partner Michael Stevens; it is their fourth film score together after Letters from Iwo Jima (2006), Rails & Ties (2007) and Gran Torino (2008). Kyle wrote few of the score for Invictus where some of them were not included in the album. Hence part of its melody were changed and used on Eastwood's studio album Songs from the Chateau (2011), which was "kind of jazzy, with a little bit of an African touch to it, too." The soundtrack features contributions from the South African a cappella group Overtone led by Yollandi Nortjie.

== Track listing ==
| No. | Title | Artist(s) | Length |
|---|---|---|---|
| 1. | "9,000 Days" | Overtone; Yollandi Nortjie | 3:14 |
| 2. | "Invictus Theme" | Kyle Eastwood; Michael Stevens | 4:09 |
| 3. | "Colorblind" | Overtone | 3:24 |
| 4. | "Siyalinda" (The Waiting) | Kyle Eastwood; Michael Stevens | 2:28 |
| 5. | "World In Union '95" | Overtone; Yollandi Nortjie | 3:50 |
| 6. | "Madiba's Theme" | Kyle Eastwood; Michael Stevens | 1:17 |
| 7. | "Hamba Nathi" | Overtone; Yollandi Nortjie | 1:35 |
| 8. | "Thanda" (Love) | Kyle Eastwood; Michael Stevens | 2:08 |
| 9. | "Shosholoza" | Overtone; Yollandi Nortjie | 3:29 |
| 10. | "Inkathi" (Time) | Kyle Eastwood; Michael Stevens | 2:34 |
| 11. | "Olé Olé Olé" (We Are The Champions) | Overtone; Yollandi Nortjie | 2:06 |
| 12. | "Enqena" (Anxious) | Kyle Eastwood; Michael Stevens | 0:59 |
| 13. | "The South African National Anthem" | Overtone | 1:56 |
| 14. | "Ukunqoba" (To Conquer) | Kyle Eastwood; Michael Stevens | 2:31 |
| 15. | "Victory" | Soweto Swing Quartet | 4:00 |
| 16. | "Xolela" (Forgiveness) | Kyle Eastwood; Michael Stevens | 1:54 |
| 17. | "The Crossing" (Osiyeza) | Overtone; Yollandi Nortjie | 2:18 |
| 18. | "9,000 Days" (Acoustic) | Emile Welman | 3:13 |
| Total length: | | | 47:05 |

== Reception ==
Mark Deming of AllMusic wrote "Clint's son Kyle Eastwood composed the score for Invictus in collaboration with Michael Stevens; this album features Eastwood and Stevens' music for the film, along with a number of South African melodies and the theme song "9,000 Days," performed by Overtone and Yollandi Nortjie." Dave Worrall of Cinema Retro wrote "Kyle Eastwood and composer Michael Stevens have, once again, produced a great sounding score, this time one that perfectly blends a beautiful haunting cinematic theme with that of South African traditional music. Highly recommended and one of my favourite Eastwood scores to date."

Todd McCarthy of Variety and Kirk Honeycutt of The Hollywood Reporter called the score "pompous" and "inspiring". Philip French of The Guardian wrote "Eastwood has also worked with his musician son Kyle to produce a remarkable soundtrack drawing on a wide variety of South African music." Dan Mecca of The Film Stage wrote "the music by Kyle Eastwood (Clint's son) and Michael Stevens is occasionally interrupted by boy band Overtone and their horribly on-the-nose pop ballads. The worst of them is "Colorblind" [...] There's really no narrative cue for the song when it appears in the film, which makes its blatant lyrics all the more obtrusive."

== Personnel ==
Credits adapted from liner notes:

- Music composers – Kyle Eastwood, Michael Stevens
- Music producer – Michael Stevens
- Music arrangements – Roger Kellaway
- Music sequencer – Valentino Ponsonby
- Recording – Bobby Fernandez
- Mixing – Bobby Fernandez, Chris McGeary
- Mastering – Stephen Marsh
- Music editor – Chris McGeary
- Executive producer – Clint Eastwood, Rob Lorenz
- Art direction – Sandeep Sriram

Orchestra

- Orchestrator and conductor – Roger Kellaway
- Contractor – Jules Chaikin
- Concertmaster – Assa Drori

Instruments

- Bassoon – Harvey Saltzman
- Cello – Earnest Eharhardt, Giovanna Clayton, Matthew Cooker, Miguel Martinez, Nancy Stein-Ross, Steve Richards, Suzie Katayma, Vanessa Freebairn
- Double bass – Charles Nenneker, David Stone, Frances Liu Wu, Kyle Eastwood, Norman Luswin, Peter Doubrovsky, Timothy Barr
- French horn – Brad Warnaar, Richard Todd
- Guitar – Renzo Mantovani, Michael Stevens
- Keyboards – Renzo Mantovani
- Percussion – Emil Radocchina, Renzo Matroni
- Piano – Mike Lang, Michael Stevens
- Trombone – Arturo Velasco, Bob McChesney, Charles Loper, Phillip Teele
- Trumpet – Gabriel Johnson
- Viola – Dan Neufeld, Denyse Buffum, Evan Wilson, Harry Shirinian, James Ross, Jorge Moraga, Marda Todd, Margot Aldcroft
- Violin – Armen Garabedian, Calabria McChesney, Caroline Cambell, Charles Everett, Charlie Bisharat, Darius Campo, Dennis Molchan, Elizabeth Wilson, Hamin Shtrum, Jennifer Munday, Joel Pargman, Mari Tsumura, Mario DeLeon, Mark Cargill, Miran Kojian, Neel Hammond, Peter Kent, Shari Zippert, Tiffany Hu, Yue Deng, Yvette Devereaux

Vocals

- Baritone – Ruan Van Zyl, Shane Smit
- Bass – Riaan Weyers
- Countertenor – Eduard Janse Van Rensburg
- Human beatbox – Valentino Ponsonby
- Tenor – Emile Welman, Ernie Bates

== Accolades ==
| Award | Category | Recipient(s) and nominee(s) | Result | Ref. |
|---|---|---|---|---|
| ASCAP Film and Television Music Awards | Top Box Office Films | Kyle Eastwood and Michael Stevens | Won | |
