= Letters from Iwo Jima (soundtrack) =

Letters from Iwo Jima (Original Motion Picture Soundtrack)

Film score by Kyle Eastwood and Michael Stevens
- Released: December 12, 2006
- Studio: Eastwood Scoring Stage, Warner Bros. Studios, Burbank, California
- Genre: Film score
- Length: 37:41
- Label: Milan
- Producer: Kyle Eastwood; Michael Stevens

Kyle Eastwood and Michael Stevens chronology
Letters from Iwo Jima (2006)	Rails & Ties (2007)

Letters from Iwo Jima (Original Motion Picture Soundtrack) is the film score to the 2006 film Letters from Iwo Jima directed and produced by Clint Eastwood. The score was composed by Clint's son Kyle Eastwood and Michael Stevens in their composition debut and released through Milan Records on December 12, 2006.

== Background and release ==
Letters from Iwo Jima is the composition debut of Clint's son and jazz bassist Kyle Eastwood and Michael Stevens. Both composers worked for Clint in arranging the music of The Rookie (1990), Mystic River (2002) and Million Dollar Baby (2004), while also worked on additional music in Flags of Our Fathers.

The score was released through Milan Records on December 12, 2006, featuring 13 tracks. Another album featuring music from Flags of Our Fathers composed by Clint, was released as a double disc album in May 2007.

== Track listing ==
No.	Title	Length
1.	"Main Titles"	4:17
2.	"Letters Montage"	3:18
3.	"Preparing for the Battle"	2:59
4.	"Suicide"	3:20
5.	"Enemy Fire"	1:39
6.	"Shimizu's Past"	3:07
7.	"Dinner Party"	3:17
8.	"Nearing the End"	2:11
9.	"Kuribayashi's Farewell Letter"	2:03
10.	"Song for the Defense of Iwo Jima"	1:18
11.	"Kuribayashi Pleads for Death"	2:55
12.	"End Titles Part 1"	2:55
13.	"End Titles Part 2"	4:22
Total length:		37:41

No.	Title	Length
14.	"Main Titles" (Radio Edit) (bonus)	2:51
15.	"Main Titles" (Composers Duet) (bonus)	2:40
16.	"Exclusive Interview With Clint Eastwood" (bonus)	16:37
17.	"Exclusive Interview With Kyle Eastwood and Michael Stevens" (bonus)	73:19

== Reception ==
Chad Grischow of IGN wrote "Kyle Eastwood and Michael Stevens' Letters From Iwo Jima strikes just the right chord with its tender, intimate, and proud score. More variety in the wonderful theme of the film would have benefited it, but as it stands it is a solid effort that shows the duo to be up and coming composers with a great deal of talent." Tim Clark of Soundtrack.Net wrote "While the album itself may not make for an entirely satisfying stand-alone listening experience, it delivers pretty much what you'd expect: a complete catalogue of the film's musical cues and an aural reminder of the film's emotional power. It may not join the pantheon of classic American film scores, but it is, in its own way, richly rewarding, moving and soulful."

Philip French of The Guardian described it "a plangent score co-written by Eastwood's son Kyle". Todd McCarthy of Variety called it a "spare score this time was composed not by the director, but by son Kyle Eastwood and Michael Stevens." Manchester Evening News-based critic wrote "Kyle Eastwood and Michael Stevens provide the elegiac soundtrack that is just as haunting as the soldier's words: "See you on the other side... If not on this Earth, then in the next." Richard A. Blake of America wrote "The score by Kyle Eastwood and Michael Stevens employs Western rather than Japanese idioms. It is moving, without being intrusive. These pieces come together magnificently."

== Personnel ==
Credits adapted from liner notes:

- Music composer and producer – Kyle Eastwood, Michael Stevens
- Orchestrator, conductor and leader – Lennie Niehaus
- Orchestra contractor – Joyce Ryan
- Concertmaster – Bruce Dukov
- Recording and mixing – Bobby Fernandez
- Mastering and editing – Christian Dwiggins
- Music preparation – Eric Stonerook Music
- Art direction – Jodi Tack
- Executive producer – Clint Eastwood, Rob Lorenz, Ian Hierons, Jean-Christophe Chamboredon

Instruments

- Bass – Ann Atkinson, Chuck Berghofer, Don Ferrone, Ian Walker, Kenny Wild, Kyle Eastwood, Peter Doubrovsky
- Cello – Armen Ksajikian, Chris Ermacoff, David Speltz, Erika Duke Kirkpatrick, Matt Cooker, Paula Hochhalter, Roger Lebow, Vanessa Freebairn Smith
- Keyboards, guitar – Michael Stevens
- Viola – Carrie Holzman, Dan Neufeld, Denyse Buffum, Janet Lakatos, Karie Prescott, Kazi Pitelka, Pamela Goldsmith, Rick Gerding, Roland Kato, Sam Formicola
- Violin – Amy Hershberger, Armen Garabedian, Charles Bisharat, Debra Price, Endre Granat, Eric Hosler, Gil Romero, Grace Ho, Haim Shtrum, Horia Moroaica, Julie Gigante, Kevin Connolly, Margaret Wooten, Mike Markman, Nicole Bush, Olivia Tsui, Raphael Rishik, Razdan Kuyumjian, Robin Olson, Tiffany YiHu, Darius Campo

== Accolades ==
Award	Category	Recipient	Result
Chicago Film Critics Association	Best Original Score	Kyle Eastwood and Michael Stevens	Nominated
