= Mystic River (soundtrack) =

Mystic River (Original Motion Picture Soundtrack)

Soundtrack album by Clint Eastwood
- Released: October 21, 2003
- Recorded: March 31–April 1, 2003
- Studio: Symphony Hall, Boston, Massachusetts
- Genre: Film score; film soundtrack
- Length: 62:22
- Label: Warner Bros. Records; Malpaso Records
- Producer: Clint Eastwood

Clint Eastwood chronology
Mystic River (2003)	Million Dollar Baby (2004)

Mystic River (Original Motion Picture Soundtrack) is the soundtrack album to the 2003 film Mystic River. The film is directed and produced by Clint Eastwood, who also served as the music composer. Mystic River marked Eastwood's scoring debut after his previous stint on assembling soundtracks, writing themes and composing his own jazz studio albums and songs. The score was recorded at the Symphony Hall in Boston, Massachusetts, and performed by the Boston Symphony Orchestra conducted by Lennie Niehaus. The score was released through Malpaso Records and Warner Bros. Records on October 21, 2003.

== Development ==
Mystic River marked Clint Eastwood's film scoring debut; he had previously composed his own jazz albums and songs during the late 1970s, written individual themes for his own films, which included "Claudia's Theme" from Unforgiven (1992) and "Big Fran's Baby" from A Perfect World (1993), amongst others and assembled his film soundtracks. Clint who initially denied scoring his own films, felt that the process came naturally. He denied on a jazz-based score due to the tone of the film but went with the three protagonists who were haunted by their past and their problems faced in their present, and inspired by that, he wrote a triad on his piano.

The score was written and played in his friend's computer after which he mocked up some synthesized instruments. Lennie Niehaus, who had composed for most of Eastwood's films, had conducted the score performed by the Boston Symphony Orchestra. Clint's son Kyle and Michael Stevens wrote few jazz instrumentals which were used as source music in the bar scene.

== Track listing ==
No.	Title	Length
1.	"Mystic River – Main Title"	1:56
2.	"Abduction"	2:40
3.	"Communion / Katie's Absence"	2:05
4.	"Jimmy's Anguish"	3:12
5.	"Meditation #1 – Piano"	2:17
6.	"Orchestral Variation #1"	7:36
7.	"Escape from the Wolves"	1:33
8.	"The Morgue"	2:05
9.	"Brendon's Love of Katie"	1:32
10.	"Meditation #2 – Piano"	2:21
11.	"Dave's Past"	2:00
12.	"The Confrontation"	7:12
13.	"The Resolution"	3:17
14.	"A Full Heart"	2:55
15.	"Meditation #3 – Piano"	3:39
16.	"Orchestral Variation #2"	3:28
17.	"Theme from Mystic River"	5:04
18.	"Cosmo" (featuring Kyle Eastwood)	5:30
19.	"Black Emerald Blues" (featuring Kyle Eastwood)	2:00
Total length:		62:22

== Critical reception ==
Thom Jurek of AllMusic wrote "This is a score for listening, not background music; it will stimulate the listener toward reflection and reminiscence." Christian Clemmensen of Filmtracks wrote "Overall, this is a score that has to be appreciated in the context of the film, and unfortunately the experience would not deter the director from relying too heavily on himself for the underachieving music in his following projects." A. O. Scott of The New York Times described it as "somber". Calling it "a fantastic jazz score", Spence D. of IGN wrote "The slow, meandering piano riffs create a genuine sense of dramatic atmosphere and complement the film without ever overpowering it." Rob Mackie of The Guardian wrote "The music, by Eastwood and his son Kyle, is exemplary, too, fitting the film's muted colours admirably."

== Personnel ==
Credits adapted from liner notes:

- Music composer and producer – Clint Eastwood
- Additional music – Kyle Eastwood and Michael Stevens
- Arrangements – Gennady Loktionov
- Orchestra – Boston Symphony Orchestra
- Chorus – Tanglewood Festival Chorus
- Conductor – Lennie Niehaus
- Orchestrator – Patrick Hollenbeck
- Piano (soloist) – Brad Hatfield
- Recording and mixing – Shawn Murphy
- Music coordinator – Bruce Ricker, Joel Cox
- Executive in charge of music for Warner Bros. Pictures – Gary LeMel
- Executive in charge of music for Warner Bros. Records – Tom Whalley
- Associate A&R for Warner Bros. Records – Randall Kennedy
- Music consultant – Bruce Ricker
- Art direction and design – Wendy Dougan
