= Al Hazan =

American musical artist (1934–2019)

- Also known as: Ali Hassan; Al Anthony; Dudley Duncan; Crazy Luke
- Born: Albert Hazan; November 7, 1934; Los Angeles, California, U.S.
- Died: March 2, 2019 (aged 84) Los Angeles, California, U.S.
- Genres: Pop, rock and roll
- Instrument: Piano
- Formerly of: B. Bumble and the Stingers
- Website: alhazan.com

Albert Hazan (November 7, 1934 – March 2, 2019) was an American pop-rock recording artist, songwriter, and record producer.

== Biography ==
Al Hazan was born and raised in Los Angeles, California. He started writing songs when in his teens, and appeared as a pianist on local television. One of his first songs, "The Dance of Love", was recorded by The Bell Sisters in 1953, arranged by Nelson Riddle for RCA Victor, but it was not released at the time. The first song of his that was released was "Is There a Heaven" by Russell Arms. In 1957, Hazan contacted Sonny Bono at Specialty Records, leading to Bono producing Roddy Jackson's version of Hazan's song "Hiccups". Other singers who recorded Hazan's songs in the late 1950s and early 1960s included Ritchie Valens, Wanda Jackson, James Darren, Gene McDaniels, and Johnny Crawford.

Hazan also worked as a session musician and arranger. In early 1962, he was contacted by Rod Pierce of Rendezvous Records, who needed a pianist to replace Ernie Freeman, who was unavailable, on a session. The recording was of "Nut Rocker", a rocked-up arrangement by Kim Fowley of the march from Tchaikovsky's ballet The Nutcracker. Hazan was allowed 30 minutes to learn the arrangement, and it was recorded quickly, in the Rendezvous office, to compete with a rival version by H. B. Barnum, who recorded it under the name "Jack B. Nimble and the Quicks". Hazan's recording, credited to B. Bumble and the Stingers, reached the pop charts in the US, and number one in the UK. When the record became a hit in Britain, Hazan made some personal appearances there as "B. Bumble".

Hazan recorded other rocked-up arrangements of classical tunes for the Philles label, credited as Ali Hassan, but they were less successful. He also released vocal recordings under various pseudonyms, including Al Anthony and Dudley Duncan, and as lead singer of The Galaxies (also known as The Royal Galaxies), again without success. Some of his recordings were arranged by his friend Jack Nitzsche. As a music producer, Hazan produced over 50 records, released on various labels including Capitol Records, United Artists Records, and Columbia Records. By his own account, he worked with Fred Astaire, Herb Alpert, Nick Venet, Terry Melcher, Lou Adler and musicians Hal Blaine, Carol Kaye, Glen Campbell, Leon Russell, Ray Pohlman, Tommy Tedesco and the rest of the first call sessioneers in Los Angeles. He also established his own music publishing company, Chemistry Music, and produced early recordings by The Beau Brummels.

Hazan left the music business in 1965. He became a licensed real estate broker, an author/poet, has been a professional fashion photographer, served two years overseas in the armed forces and, after going back to college later in life, graduated U.C.L.A. magna cum laude with a bachelor's degree in Communication Studies in 1984, going on to earn a Ph.D. in Psychology in 1990. As Dr. Hazan, he was awarded a presidential commendation by President Ronald Reagan for his work with victims of violent crimes. He also specialized in couples therapy and wrote his first book about love relationships entitled Blissful Fusion - The Seven Stages of a Successful Love Relationship. A year later he followed up with a novel entitled The Will to Love. His poems were published in magazines and some are available on the Internet.

Al Hazan's 1961 song "Is It a Sin?" (recorded under his Al Anthony alias) was used in the Netflix Original series Stranger Things in season 3, episode 3.

Hazan under the pseudonym Dudley Duncan, 1962 song "Gold Cup" was used again in another Netflix Original, 2023's edition of the series Untold in the episode 'Hall Of Shame' which covered the infamous BALCO scandal mostly centred around the man behind the Bay Area Laboratory Co-operative or BALCO Victor Conte.

Hazan died in Los Angeles, aged 84, in 2019.
