= Chicago Film Critics Association Award for Best Original Score =

Annual US film award

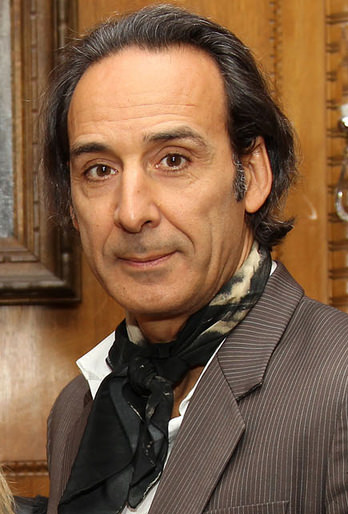
French composer Alexandre Desplat has received the most nominations, and has one win.

The Chicago Film Critics Association Award for Best Original Score is one of several categories presented by the Chicago Film Critics Association (CFCA), an association of professional film critics, who work in print, broadcast and online media, based in Chicago. Since the 6th Chicago Film Critics Association Awards (1993), the award has been presented annually. The nominations from 1993, 1994 and 2004 are not available. The first Chicago Film Critics Association Award for Best Original Score went to composer Michael Nyman for his score to The Piano. The most recent recipient of this award is Jonny Greenwood for One Battle After Another.

French film composer Alexandre Desplat has the most nominations (13), with one win. Jonny Greenwood has the most wins (four) from seven nominations, while Howard Shore has three wins from six nominations. Hans Zimmer has eleven nominations, which have resulted in one win. English musician Clint Mansell has two wins from two nominations, while Mica Levi has two wins from three nominations and Trent Reznor and Atticus Ross have two wins from four nominations. Other notable achievers are James Horner, Randy Newman, and Carter Burwell who all have one win from multiple nominations. Several composers have been nominated multiple times, but never received the award, including Danny Elfman, Philip Glass and Elliot Goldenthal.

The 12th Chicago Film Critics Association Awards (1999) saw the first two female composers, Jocelyn Pook and Rachel Portman, nominated for the award. In 2007, Markéta Irglová became the first female musician to win the award, along with Glen Hansard, for their work on Once. James Newton Howard became the first composer to receive multiple nominations at the 18th Chicago Film Critics Association Awards. He was nominated for his work on King Kong and his collaboration with Zimmer on Batman Begins. At the 25th Chicago Film Critics Association Awards (2012), Desplat received nominations for his scores to Argo, Moonrise Kingdom and Zero Dark Thirty, the first time a composer has been nominated three times in one year. In 2023, Robbie Robertson received the award posthumously.

== Winners and nominees ==
=== 1990s ===
Year	Film	Composer(s)	Ref.
1993	The Piano	Michael Nyman	
1994	The Lion King	Hans Zimmer	
1995	Toy Story	Randy Newman	
1995	Apollo 13	James Horner	
1995	Get Shorty	John Lurie	
1995	Heat	Elliot Goldenthal	
1995	The Secret of Roan Inish	Mason Daring	
1996	Fargo	Carter Burwell	
1996	Dead Man	Neil Young	
1996	James and the Giant Peach	Randy Newman	
1996	Michael Collins	Elliot Goldenthal	
1996	That Thing You Do!	Howard Shore	
1997	Titanic	James Horner	
1997	Gattaca	Michael Nyman	
1997	Kundun	Philip Glass	
1997	L.A. Confidential	Jerry Goldsmith	
1997	The Sweet Hereafter	Mychael Danna	
1998	The Truman Show	Burkhard Dallwitz	
1998	A Bug's Life	Randy Newman	
1998	The Butcher Boy	Elliot Goldenthal	
1998	Elizabeth	David Hirschfelder	
1998	A Simple Plan	Danny Elfman	
1999	South Park: Bigger, Longer & Uncut	Trey Parker and Marc Shaiman	
1999	The Cider House Rules	Rachel Portman	
1999	Eyes Wide Shut	Jocelyn Pook	
1999	The Red Violin	John Corigliano	
1999	Run Lola Run	Tom Tykwer, Johnny Klimek, and Reinhold Heil	

=== 2000s ===
Year	Film	Composer(s)	Ref.
2000	Crouching Tiger, Hidden Dragon	Tan Dun	
2000	Dancer in the Dark	Björk	
2000	Gladiator	Hans Zimmer and Lisa Gerrard	
2000	O Brother, Where Art Thou?	T-Bone Burnett	
2000	The Virgin Suicides	Jean-Benoît Dunckel and Nicolas Godin	
2001	The Lord of the Rings: The Fellowship of the Ring	Howard Shore	
2001	A.I. Artificial Intelligence	John Williams	
2001	A Beautiful Mind	James Horner	
2001	In the Mood for Love	Michael Galasso and Shigeru Umebayashi	
2001	Mulholland Drive	Angelo Badalamenti	
2002	Far from Heaven	Elmer Bernstein	
2002	The Hours	Philip Glass	
2002	The Lord of the Rings: The Two Towers	Howard Shore	
2002	Punch-Drunk Love	Jon Brion	
2002	Spirited Away	Joe Hisaishi	
2003	The Lord of the Rings: The Return of the King	Howard Shore	
2003	Big Fish	Danny Elfman	
2003	Cold Mountain	Gabriel Yared	
2003	The Fog of War	Philip Glass	
2003	The Triplets of Belleville	Benoît Charest	
2004	The Aviator	Howard Shore	
2005	Brokeback Mountain	Gustavo Santaolalla	
2005	Batman Begins	Hans Zimmer and James Newton Howard	
2005	Charlie and the Chocolate Factory	Danny Elfman	
2005	King Kong	James Newton Howard	
2005	Memoirs of a Geisha	John Williams	
2006	The Fountain	Clint Mansell	
2006	Babel	Gustavo Santaolalla	
2006	Letters from Iwo Jima	Kyle Eastwood and Michael Stevens	
2006	Notes on a Scandal	Philip Glass	
2006	The Queen	Alexandre Desplat	
2007	Once	Glen Hansard and Markéta Irglová	
2007	The Assassination of Jesse James	Nick Cave and Warren Ellis	
2007	Atonement	Dario Marianelli	
2007	Lust, Caution	Alexandre Desplat	
2007	There Will Be Blood	Jonny Greenwood	
2008	WALL-E	Thomas Newman	
2008	The Curious Case of Benjamin Button	Alexandre Desplat	
2008	The Dark Knight	Hans Zimmer and James Newton Howard	
2008	Milk	Danny Elfman	
2008	Slumdog Millionaire	A. R. Rahman	
2009	Up	Michael Giacchino	
2009	Avatar	James Horner	
2009	Fantastic Mr. Fox	Alexandre Desplat	
2009	The Informant!	Marvin Hamlisch	
2009	Where the Wild Things Are	Carter Burwell and Karen O	

=== 2010s ===
Year	Film	Composer(s)	Ref.
2010	Black Swan	Clint Mansell	
2010	I Am Love	John Adams	
2010	Inception	Hans Zimmer	
2010	The Social Network	Trent Reznor and Atticus Ross	
2010	True Grit	Carter Burwell	
2011	Drive	Cliff Martinez	
2011	The Artist	Ludovic Bource	
2011	The Girl with the Dragon Tattoo	Trent Reznor and Atticus Ross	
2011	Hanna	The Chemical Brothers	
2011	Hugo	Howard Shore	
2012	The Master	Jonny Greenwood	
2012	Argo	Alexandre Desplat	
2012	Beasts of the Southern Wild	Dan Romer and Benh Zeitlin	
2012	Moonrise Kingdom	Alexandre Desplat	
2012	Zero Dark Thirty	Alexandre Desplat	
2013	Her	Arcade Fire	
2013	Blancanieves	Alfonso de Vilallonga	
2013	Gravity	Steven Price	
2013	Spring Breakers	Cliff Martinez and Skrillex	
2013	12 Years a Slave	Hans Zimmer	
2014	Under the Skin	Mica Levi	
2014	Birdman	Antonio Sánchez	
2014	The Grand Budapest Hotel	Alexandre Desplat	
2014	The Imitation Game	Alexandre Desplat	
2014	Interstellar	Hans Zimmer	
2015	The Hateful Eight	Ennio Morricone	
2015	Carol	Carter Burwell	
2015	Inside Out	Michael Giacchino	
2015	It Follows	Disasterpeace	
2015	Mad Max: Fury Road	Junkie XL	
2016	Jackie	Mica Levi	
2016	Arrival	Jóhann Jóhannsson	
2016	La La Land	Justin Hurwitz	
2016	Moonlight	Nicholas Britell	
2016	The Neon Demon	Cliff Martinez	
2017	Phantom Thread	Jonny Greenwood	
2017	Blade Runner 2049	Benjamin Wallfisch and Hans Zimmer	
2017	Dunkirk	Hans Zimmer	
2017	The Shape of Water	Alexandre Desplat	
2017	War for the Planet of the Apes	Michael Giacchino	
2018	If Beale Street Could Talk	Nicholas Britell	
2018	First Man	Justin Hurwitz	
2018	Mandy	Jóhann Jóhannsson	
2018	Suspiria	Thom Yorke	
2018	You Were Never Really Here	Jonny Greenwood	
2019	Little Women	Alexandre Desplat	
2019	1917	Thomas Newman	
2019	Marriage Story	Randy Newman	
2019	Uncut Gems	Daniel Lopatin	
2019	Us	Michael Abels	

=== 2020s ===
Year	Film	Composer(s)	Ref.
2020	Soul	Jon Batiste, Trent Reznor, and Atticus Ross	
2020	Da 5 Bloods	Terence Blanchard	
2020	Ma Rainey's Black Bottom	Bradford Marsalis	
2020	Mank	Trent Reznor and Atticus Ross	
2020	Tenet	Ludwig Göransson	
2021	The Power of the Dog	Jonny Greenwood	
2021	Annette	Ron Mael and Russell Mael	
2021	Dune	Hans Zimmer	
2021	The French Dispatch	Alexandre Desplat	
2021	Spencer	Jonny Greenwood	
2022	Babylon	Justin Hurwitz	
2022	The Banshees of Inisherin	Carter Burwell	
2022	The Batman	Michael Giacchino	
2022	Guillermo del Toro's Pinocchio	Alexandre Desplat	
2022	RRR	M. M. Keeravani	
2023	Killers of the Flower Moon	Robbie Robertson (posthumous)	
2023	Barbie	Mark Ronson and Andrew Wyatt	
2023	Oppenheimer	Ludwig Goransson	
2023	Poor Things	Jerskin Fendrix	
2023	The Zone of Interest	Mica Levi	
2024	Challengers	Trent Reznor and Atticus Ross	
2024	The Brutalist	Daniel Blumberg	
2024	Dune: Part Two	Hans Zimmer	
2024	Nosferatu	Robin Carolan	
2024	Wicked	John Powell and Stephen Schwartz	
2024	The Wild Robot	Kris Bowers	
2025	One Battle After Another	Jonny Greenwood	
2025	The Mastermind	Rob Mazurek	
2025	Sinners	Ludwig Göransson	
2025	The Testament of Ann Lee	Daniel Blumberg	
2025	Train Dreams	Bryce Dessner	

== See also ==
- List of film music awards § Best score
