= Nut Rocker =

1962 single by B. Bumble and the Stingers

Single by B. Bumble and the Stingers
- B-side: "Nautilus"
- Released: 1962
- Genre: Instrumental rock
- Length: 1:59
- Label: Rendezvous R 166-1 (UK Top Rank Records)
- Songwriters: Pyotr Ilyich Tchaikovsky, Kim Fowley
- Producer: Kim Fowley

B. Bumble and the Stingers singles chronology
"Rockin-On'n'-Off" (1962)	"Nut Rocker" (1962)	"Dawn Cracker" (1962)

"Nut Rocker" is an instrumental rock single recorded by American instrumental ensemble B. Bumble and the Stingers that reached number 23 in the U.S. Billboard Hot 100 in March 1962 and went to number 1 in the UK Singles Chart in May 1962. It is a version of the march from Tchaikovsky's 1892 ballet The Nutcracker.

== Original recording ==
The recording was made by the house band of session musicians at Rendezvous Records in Los Angeles, including drummer Earl Palmer and guitarist René Hall, who had already had hits in the US charts with rocked-up versions of "In the Mood" (1959, credited to the Ernie Fields Orchestra) and "Bumble Boogie" (1961, also credited to B. Bumble and the Stingers, with Ernie Freeman on piano). "Nut Rocker" was produced by Kim Fowley, and, since Freeman did not show up, featured pianist Al Hazan.

In 1962, Fowley secured the copyright to an arrangement of the march from Tchaikovsky's 1892 ballet The Nutcracker and took this to local entrepreneur and pianist H. B. Barnum. Barnum recorded it as by "Jack B. Nimble and the Quicks" on the small Del Rio label. However, when Rod Pierce of Rendezvous Records heard it, he convinced Fowley that his label could do a better version with their own band. A new recording was arranged, but on the day, Ernie Freeman, who had played piano on "Bumble Boogie", did not appear, apparently due to heavy partying the night before. In his place, guitarist and arranger René Hall rushed pianist Al Hazan into the Rendezvous office, which was rigged up as an improvised studio. According to Hazan, "Rod decided to record the first take while I was still trying to practice the piece with the other musicians. Because I was so rushed to learn 'Nut Rocker', I was not happy at all with my performance on that first take. However, in spite of my asking Rod to let me do it over again, he said he liked it just fine the way it was." Released as "Nut Rocker" in February 1962, the record went to No. 23 in the US and No. 1 in the UK.

The song is a fast, lively track that is purely instrumental and was the band's biggest hit. It was reissued in 1972 in the UK, and again made the charts (No. 20, week ending July 8).

== Reception ==
At the time of its original release in the UK, the BBC had a policy of banning records which parodied classical music. "Nut Rocker" was put to committee, which decided that "[t]his instrumental piece is quite openly a parody of a Tchaikovsky dance tune, is clearly of an ephemeral nature, and in our opinion will not offend reasonable people", and was not therefore banned. Between 2012 and 2017 BBC Radio 1 presenter Greg James used the song as a theme for people to celebrate going home from work during his drivetime show.

It was the theme song for Boston Bruins ice hockey broadcasts in the 1970s and 1980s on WSBK-TV of Boston.

It has been featured in many commercials, movies and television programmes such as Butcher Boy (1998), Big Momma's House (2000) and ITV's Heartbeat in 2006.

The song is used as the theme tune for the Stock Rod racing formula on many of the UK's short oval car racing circuits. It was also used by Romanian gymnast Simona Amânar in her floor exercise routine which won a silver medal at the 1996 Olympics.

The song was used as a soundtrack in the second season of Greek comedy television series I andres den iparhoun pia (Men no longer exist), with Hristos Valavanidis and Filippos Sofianos in 1999 on Mega Channel.

== Other recordings ==
"Nut Rocker (Live)"

Single by Emerson, Lake & Palmer

from the album Pictures at an Exhibition
- B-side: "The Great Gates Of Kiev"
- Released: February 1972
- Genre: Progressive rock, jazz fusion
- Length: 4:25
- Label: Cotillion
- Songwriters: Pyotr Ilyich Tchaikovsky, Kim Fowley

Emerson, Lake & Palmer singles chronology
"Stones of Years" (1971)	"Nut Rocker (Live)" (1972)	"From the Beginning" (1972)

It was a live favourite when performed by prog-rockers Emerson, Lake & Palmer, whose single was also released in 1972. Cash Box described it as "Classic live rock extraordinaire." The single reached #70 on the U.S. Billboard Hot 100 and #92 on U.S. Cashbox. The main keyboard they used was not a piano but a Clavinet (although Emerson switched it to a Yamaha CP-70 during the 1977/78 live performances). In 2009, Trans-Siberian Orchestra released a version of "Nut Rocker", featuring Greg Lake, on their album Night Castle.

=== Charts ===
Chart (1972)	Peak position
Canada Top Singles (RPM)	48
Japanese Singles (Oricon)	70
US Billboard Hot 100	70
