= Paris Blue (album) =

Studio album by Kyle Eastwood
- Released: 2004
- Genre: Jazz
- Label: Rendezvous Records

Kyle Eastwood chronology
From There to Here (1998)	Paris Blue (2004)	Now (2006)

Professional ratings
Review scores
Source	Rating
Allmusic	4/5 stars

Paris Blue is a 2004 album by American jazz bassist and composer Kyle Eastwood, released on the Rendezvous Records label.

== Background ==
The album was recorded in Paris with an international ensemble, jointly composed and programmed by Eastwood and Michael Stevens. Eastwood's played on both electric and acoustic bass. Saxophonist Doug Webb and trumpeter Jim Rotondi also play on the album. Rostm Khajikian plays doudouk on the track Marrakech.

== Reception ==
The album was warmly received in the jazz community. Allmusic said of the album " Paris Blue kicks off with the phenomenal "Big Noise (From Winnetka)," a collision between acid jazz turntablism and hard bop in the mid-'50s Miles Davis style that works on both levels. (The more dance-oriented remix at album's end cutely emphasizes the oddball whistled hook but is otherwise an overlong, plodding mess.)". All About Jazz critic George Harris said that the album has "something for everyone: creativity, deep grooves and excellent lead solos" and compared the recording to the jazz tradition of Charles Mingus, only "updated and as fresh as this morning's brew". Several of the songs, notably "Marrakech" in particular and "Paris Blue" have an atmospheric "Middle Eastern flavor" which Harris states "melds perfectly with the serpentine soprano sax and mourning duduk".

The Guardian describes it: "it's a set straddling regular jazz, 1970s early-fusion, world music and contemporary dancefloor technology."

== Track listing ==
1. "Big Noise (From Winnetka)" - 3:38
2. "Marrakech" - 5:57
3. "Muse" - 5:49
4. "Le Pont Royal" - 6:43
5. "Solferino" - 6:26
6. "Cosmo" - 5:28
7. "Paris Blue" - 8:15
8. "Big Noise Remix" - 7:17
9. "Marrakech Remix" - 5:51
