= Film Festival Kitzbühel =

Film festival in Kitzbühel, Austria

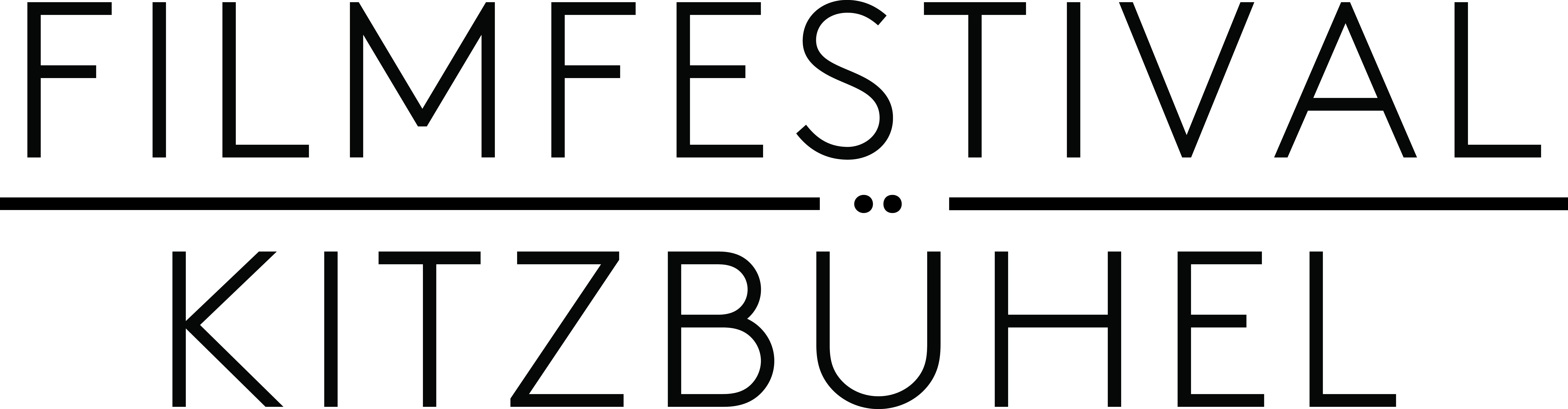
Film Festival Kitzbuehel Logo

Film Festival' Kitzbuehel is an Austrian international film festival focusing on emerging filmmakers that takes place in Kitzbuehel/Tyrol in the last week of August each year. The Film Festival Kitzbuehel offers filmmakers from all over the world the opportunity for their works to be shown, discussed and promoted. The festival comprises competitive sections for national and international fiction and documentary feature films as well as short films and a group of out-of-competition sections, including the Spotlights, In Persona, Heimat, Mountain Sport Shorts and a Retrospective. A particular emphasis is put on films from the EU and, starting in 2017, Film Festival Kitzbuehel has entered partnerships with Transilvania International Film Festival, Sofia International Film Festival, and Bolzano Filmfestival

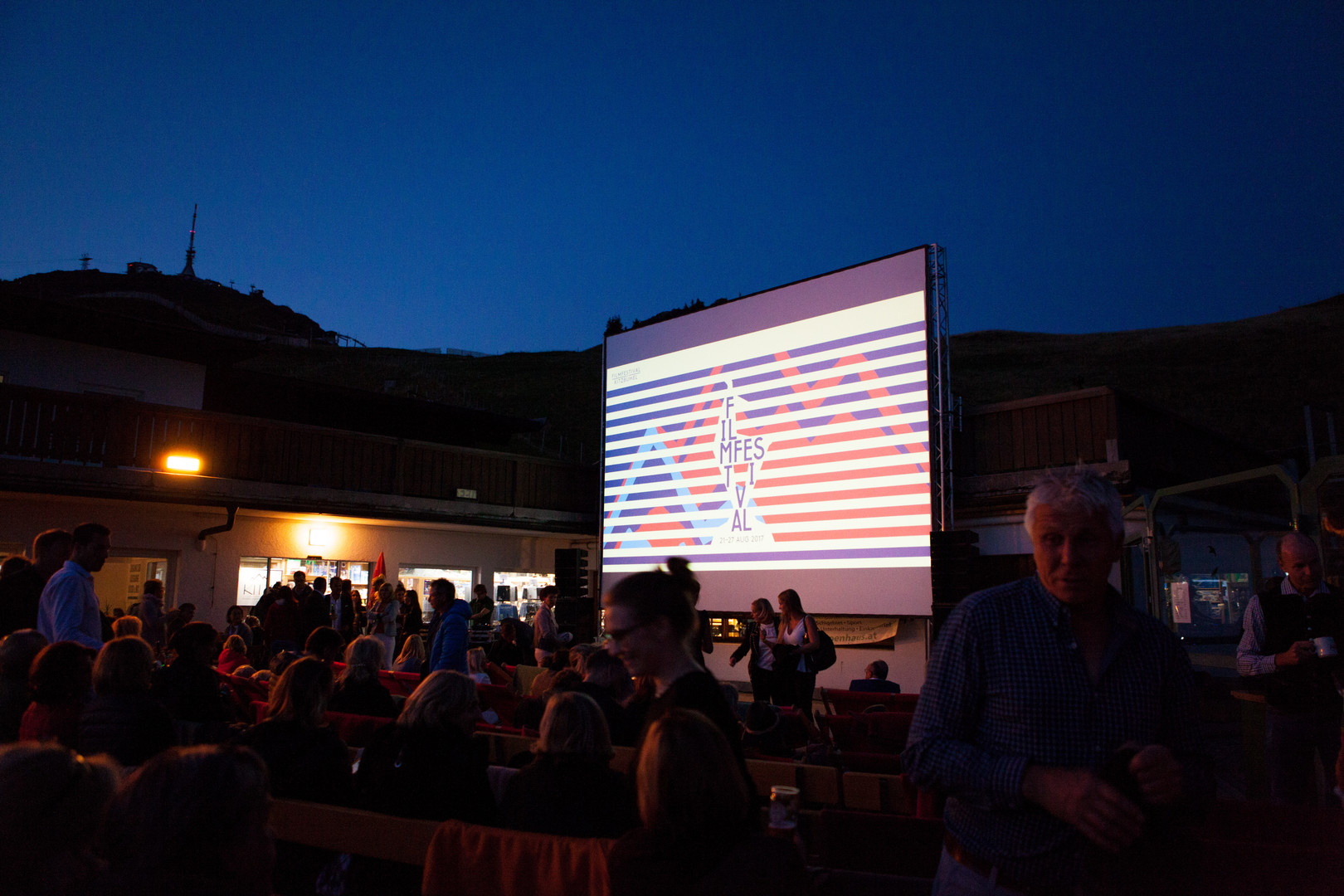
Film Festival Kitzbuehel - Cinema on the Mountain

== History ==
Film Festival Kitzbuehel was founded in 2012 by Michael Reisch, Kathryn Perotti, Nina Hipfl-Reisch, Mike Mayr-Reisch, Josef Obermoser and Roman Benedetto. Since its first edition in 2013, the festival has attracted increasing numbers of international guests and participants. Its location, the alpine town of Kitzbuehel, was previously mainly known for winter sports. The festival week features highlights such as the "Drive-In Cinema" showing cinema classics, as well as a screening at the highest cinema in Europe (at 1.670 m), on Kitzbuehler Horn. In 2018 the film festival initiated screenings in the old town of Kitzbuehel, called "Cinema in the City", which is for free and open to everyone. In February 2016, Film Festival Kitzbuehel was accredited by FIAPF (Federation Association Internationale des Producteurs de Films) as a competitive feature film festival.

== Script Lab ("Drehbuchklausur") ==
The script lab, held and organized by the FFKB Foundation, is a 20 day long screenplay writing workshop, where script writers can develop scripts and present their work. The script lab is intended to give filmmakers from Austria and German-speaking Europe a chance to work on their creations with colleagues, tutors and experts from the national and international movie industry, as well as to exchange ideas and to network.

== Awarded Films ==
2020

- Opening Film — Narzisst und Goldmund — from Stefan Rusowitzky (Ger)
- Best Narrative Feature Film — Ein bisschen bleiben wir noch from Arash T. Riad(Aut)
- Best Documentary Feature — Lost in Memories from Ruud Lenssen (Netherlands)
- Best Austrian Director (ÖFI & FFKB Award) — Safety 123 from Julia Gutweniger (Aut)
- Best Austrian Producer — Rettet das Dorf from Teresa Distelberger (Aut)
- Best Short Film — Matriochkas from Bérangère McNeese, Stefan Langthaler (Belgium, France)
- Audience Award – Green Sea from Angeliki Antonious (Greece)
- Best Austrian Newcomer — Fabiu from Stefan Langthaler (Aut)
- Retrospective and Honorary Award — Veronika Ferres

2019

- Opening Film — Es hätte schlimmer kommen können - Mario Adorf from Dominik Wessely
- Best Narrative Feature Film — Nevrland from Gregor Schmidinger(Aut)
- Best Documentary Feature — Another Life from Jan Prazak (Aut, Ger)
- Best Austrian Director (ÖFI & FFKB Award) - Caviar from Elena Tikhonova (Aut)
- Best Austrian Producer — Womit haben wir das verdient from Eva Spreitzhofer (Aut)
- Best Short Film — The Christmas Gift from Bogdan Muresanu (Romania, Spain)
- Audience Award – Dream State from Asger K. Bartels (Denmark)
- Best Austrian Newcomer — Der Wächter from Albin Wildner (Aut)
- Retrospective and Honorary Award — Helmut Berger

2018

- Best Narrative Feature Film — Adam (Ger, Iceland, Mex, USA)
- Best Documentary Feature — Nos llaman guerreras (Venezuela, USA, Mex)
- Best Austrian Director (ÖFI & FFKB Award) — Heimweh (AUT) and ex-aequo Bruder Jakob, schläfst du noch? (Aut)
- Best Short Film — Retouch (Iran)
- Best Short Documentary — Unforgiveable (Italy, USA, Rwanda)
- Audience Award — der Minusmann: Die Doku (Aut)
- Best Austrian Newcomer — Entschuldigung, ich suche den Tischtennisraum und meine Freundin (Aut)
- Best Mountain Sport Short —- Ya Mas —- Snowmads in Greece (Greece, Aut)
- Retrospective and Honorary Award —- Marie Bäumer

2017

- Best Narrative Feature Film — Amok (FYR Macedonia)
- Best Documentary Feature — A Young Girl in Her 90s (FR)
- Best Short Film — The Dog Catcher (POL)
- Audience Award —– Painless (USA)
- Best Austrian Newcomer — Lacrimosa (AT)
- Best Winter Sport Short — The White Maze (RUS/USA)
- Retrospective and 1st Honorary Award — Joseph Vilsmaier

2016

- Best Narrative Feature Film — Mother (EST)
- Best Documentary Feature — Raving Iran (SUI)
- Best Short Film — Lightningface (USA)
- Audience Award — Where to, Miss? (IND)
- Best Austrian Newcomer — Die Last der Erinnerung (AUT)
- Best Winter Sport Short — Snowflake
- Retrospective — Sir Peter Ustinov

2015

- Best Narrative Feature Film — Keep in Touch (USA)
- Best Documentary Feature — Unversöhnt (GER)
- Best Short Film — So schön wie du (DE)
- Audience Award — My Blind Heart (AT)
- Best Austrian Newcomer — Pitter Patter Goes My Heart (AT)
- Retrospective — Felix Mitterer

2014

- Best Narrative Feature Film — Meeresstille (GER)
- Best Documentary Feature — Homme Less (AT)
- Best Short Film — Bully (USA)
- Audience Award — Grey Sheep (DE/US)
- Best Austrian Newcomer – Attention - A Life in Extremes (AT)
- Retrospective — Mario Adorf

2013

- Best Narrative Feature Film — Tutti Giu (CH)
- Best Documentary Feature — The Bengali Detective (AT/USA)
- Best Short Film — The Acrobat (ESP)
- Audience Award — Smash & Grab (UK)
- Best Austrian Newcomer – Erdbeerland (AT)
- Retrospective — Billy Wilder
