= San Diego Film Critics Society Awards 2004 =

Annual US film awards ceremony

9th SDFCS Awards

December 21, 2004

Best Film:
Vera Drake

The 9th San Diego Film Critics Society Awards, given by the San Diego Film Critics Society, honored the best in film for 2004.

== Winners ==
- Best Actor:
  - Jim Carrey – Eternal Sunshine of the Spotless Mind
- Best Actress:
  - Imelda Staunton – Vera Drake
- Best Animated Film:
  - The Incredibles
- Best Cinematography (tie):
  - Hero (Ying xiong)
  - The Phantom of the Opera
- Best Director:
  - Clint Eastwood – Million Dollar Baby
- Best Documentary Film:
  - Tarnation
- Best Editing:
  - Eternal Sunshine of the Spotless Mind
- Best Film:
  - Vera Drake
- Best Foreign Language Film:
  - The Sea Inside (Mar adentro) • Spain/France/Italy
- Best Production Design:
  - The Aviator
- Best Score:
  - "Million Dollar Baby" – Clint Eastwood
- Best Screenplay – Adapted:
  - Sideways – Alexander Payne and Jim Taylor
- Best Screenplay – Original:
  - Vera Drake - Mike Leigh
- Best Supporting Actor:
  - Phil Davis – Vera Drake
- Best Supporting Actress:
  - Natalie Portman – Closer
- Body of Work award:
  - Don Cheadle – The Assassination of Richard Nixon, Hotel Rwanda and The United States of Leland
