= Amish Grace =

2010 Television Film

- Promotional poster
- Based on: Amish Grace: How Forgiveness Transcended Tragedy by Donald B. Kraybill, Steven M. Nolt and David L. Weaver-Zercher
- Written by: Sylvie White and Teena Booth
- Directed by: Gregg Champion
- Starring: Kimberly Williams-Paisley; Tammy Blanchard; Matt Letscher
- Theme music composer: Joseph Conlan
- Country of origin: United States
- Original language: English

Production
- Producer: Larry A. Thompson
- Editor: Anita Brandt-Burgoyne
- Running time: 88 minutes

Original release
- Network: Lifetime Movie Network
- Release: March 28, 2010

Amish Grace is a television film that premiered on the Lifetime Movie Network on Palm Sunday, March 28, 2010. The film is based on the 2006 West Nickel Mines School shooting at Nickel Mines, Pennsylvania, and the spirit of forgiveness the Amish community demonstrated in its aftermath.

The film stars Kimberly Williams-Paisley, Tammy Blanchard, and Matt Letscher and is based on the book Amish Grace: How Forgiveness Transcended Tragedy, Jossey-Bass, 2007, ISBN 0-7879-9761-7, by Donald Kraybill, Steven Nolt, and David L. Weaver-Zercher. Amish Grace was executive-produced by Larry A. Thompson, written by Sylvie White and Teena Booth, and directed by Gregg Champion.

== Plot ==
When a group of Amish schoolgirls are taken hostage and killed in their classroom, their parents and the Amish community of Nickel Mines, Pennsylvania, stun the outside world by immediately forgiving the killer. Ida Graber (Kimberly Williams-Paisley), mother of one of the murdered children, has a tougher time than the others accepting the tragedy, but in her anguish and pain, she begins a personal journey of renewed faith, ultimately accepting the heart-wrenching tragedy of losing a child after learning that her murdered daughter, Mary Beth Graber, had promised to pray for the perpetrator before her death; reconnecting with her husband (Matt Letscher), family, and community; offering forgiveness to the killer; and even showing kindness and compassion to the killer's widow (Tammy Blanchard) and children — all in the form of Amish grace.

The film was dedicated in memory of the victims of the West Nickel Mines School shooting.

== Cast ==
- Kimberly Williams-Paisley as Ida Graber, an Amish mother who loses her elder child in the shooting and learns forgiveness from the tragedy.
- Tammy Blanchard as Amy Roberts, the widow of Charlie Roberts whom Ida refuses to accept.
- Matt Letscher as Gideon Graber, the husband of Ida Graber and father of Mary Beth and Katie Graber.
- Fay Masterson as Jill Green, a television reporter whom Ida befriends.
- Madison Mason as Levi Brennaman
- Karley Scott Collins as Katie Graber, the younger daughter of Ida and Gideon who escapes before the shooting.
- John Churchill as Charlie Roberts, the perpetrator of the school shooting who commits suicide after firing at the victims.
- Gary Graham as Henry Taskey.
- Darcy Rose Byrnes as Rebecca Knepp, a survived victim whom at the end reveals that Mary Beth Graber has forgiven Charlie Roberts.
- Eugene Byrd as Danny, a camera man who works with Jill Green
- Amy Sloan as Rachel Knepp, mother of Rebecca Knepp.
- Madison Davenport as Mary Beth Graber, the elder daughter of Ida and Gideon who promises to pray for the perpetrator before she is killed.
- Willow Geer as Judith.
- Jim Metzler as County Sheriff.
- David Mazouz as Andy Roberts, a son of Charlie Roberts.
- Eric Nenninger as State Trooper.

== Ratings ==
Amish Grace broke network records in multiple demographics, with more than 4 million viewers, becoming the highest-rated and most-watched original movie in Lifetime Movie Network’s history. Households (3.8/2,916,449 viewers), Total Viewers (2.0/4,020,496), Women 18+ (3.5/2,729,834), Women 25-54 (2.7/1,156,363), Adults 18+ (2.4/3,649,266) and Adults 25-54 (1.9/1,585,667).

== Reception ==
The film mostly received positive reviews; however, it received criticism because the authors of Amish Grace: How Forgiveness Transcended Tragedy, Jossey-Bass, 2007, ISBN 0-7879-9761-7, distanced themselves from the production out of respect to the Amish community. Others criticized the film for blending facts with fiction.

== Awards ==
- Nominated for the Humanitas Prize
- Winner of the MOVIEGUIDE Epiphany Prize for Most Inspiring TV Program of 2010
- Madison Mason won the Grace Award for Television at the 2011 Movieguide Awards for Amish Grace.
