= Micky Levy =

American actress

- מיקי לוי
- Born: Tel Aviv, Israel
- Occupations: Director, writer, producer, actress
- Years active: 2003–present

Micky Levy (Hebrew: מיקי לוי) is an Israeli-American film director, screenwriter and actress.

== Early life ==
Micky Levy was born in Tel Aviv, Israel and grew up in Eilat. Her first book of poetry, White Stoplights, was published when she was 15. Micky arrived in Los Angeles when she was 17 with just $700 in her pocket.

== Career ==
Micky started her career acting in independent horror films. She worked for Academy Award Nominated screenwriter Arthur A. Ross.

Micky’s first produced film was the short, 2 on U, that she wrote and produced with Dayna Cussler. Micky's television pilot, LAM, won the Scriptapalooza Screenwriting Competition.

Micky wrote the feature script Rails & Ties, a Warner Bros. film. Alison Eastwood directed the film which starred Kevin Bacon, Marcia Gay Harden and Miles Heizer. Rails & Ties premiered at the Toronto International Film Festival in 2007.

Micky wrote Lifetime (TV Network)’s “Amish Grace”, starring Kimberly Williams-Paisley, for which she received a Humanitas Prize nomination and won the Epiphany Prize. Micky wrote “Amish Grace” under the pseudonym Sylvie White. The film was co-written by Teena Booth.

Micky wrote, directed and produced the documentary short "The First Time: Writing and Sex" that was lensed by Svetlana Cvetko.

Micky wrote, directed and produced the narrative short film Page’s Great and Grand Escape. The short played the festival circuit including the Newport Beach Film Festival, Raindance Film Festival and HollyShorts Film Festival .

Micky’s adaptation of Caryl Phillips’ novel, Dancing in the Dark (novel), placed in the top ten of the Showtime Tony Cox Screenplay Competition.

== Filmography ==
Year	Film	Director	Writer	Note
2002	2 on U	No	Yes	Short film
2007	Rails & Ties	No	Yes	
2010	Amish Grace	No	Yes	TV movie
2013	The First Time: Writing & Sex	Yes	Yes	Documentary
2014	Page's Great and Grand Escape	Yes	Yes	Short film
2017	Dipsticks	Yes	No	2 episodes
2018	Union	Yes	No	Short film
