= Elektro Moskva =

2013 Austrian documentary film

- Theatrical release poster
- Directed by: Elena Tikhonova, Dominik Spritzendorfer
- Written by: Elena Tikhonova, Dominik Spritzendorfer
- Produced by: Dominik Spritzendorfer
- Narrated by: Andrey Andrianov
- Cinematography: Dominik Spritzendorfer
- Edited by: Michael Palm
- Music by: Yuri Klevanski
- Production company: Rotor Film
- Distributed by: filmdelights
- Release date: April 2013 (Diagonale)
- Running time: 89 minutes
- Country: Austria
- Languages: Russian, English (narration)

Elektro Moskva is a 2013 Austrian music documentary film directed and written by Elena Tikhonova and Dominik Spritzendorfer. It is their directorial debut. The film is an essayistic exploration of Soviet and post-Soviet "electro-history", spanning from Theremin to synthesizers to KGB surveillance tools.

== Content ==
The documentary delves into the nearly century-long history of Soviet and Russian experimental electronic music, employing archival footage and contemporary interviews, for example with musician Alexei Borisov, to offer insight into the cultural and social changes within Russia. It pays homage to the pioneers of futuristic sounds, illustrating the evolution of electronic music within both Soviet and post-Soviet contexts. Additionally, it underscores the relationship between musical technology and military research, the clandestine nature of musical experimentation by circuit-benders amidst political censorship, and the ingenuity of the individuals responsible for pioneering electronic instruments.

== Production ==
Elektro Moskva is an independently produced documentary, Dominik Spritzendorfer served as the producer. The film received financial grants from Austrian Ministry of Education and Lower Austria cultural fund. The picture was shot over a period of eight years. Interview with music critic Artemy Troitsky did not end up in the final cut and is available as a DVD extra. The film features the final interview of Leon Theremin which was shot by Sergei Zezyulkov, and was never released before. It serves as a prologue and epilogue to the documentary.

== Release ==
The film had its world premiere at Diagonale in April 2013. The same year it was also screened at the Marseille Festival of Documentary Film.

== Reception ==
The film received a positive reception from international critics. Austrian outlet Skug described it as "one of the most important music history films of our time".

== See also ==
- Theremin: An Electronic Odyssey, a 1993 film about the inventor Léon Theremin
- Caviar, a 2019 comedy film by Elena Tikhonova.
