= Caviar (film) =

2019 film

- Directed by: Elena Tikhonova
- Written by: Elena Tikhonova, Robert Buchschwenter
- Produced by: Ursula Wolschlager, Oliver Auspitz, Kurt J. Mrkwicka, Andreas Kamm, Franz Novotny, Alexander Glehr
- Starring: Margarita Breitkreiz, Darya Nosik, Sabrina Reiter
- Cinematography: Dominik Spritzendorfer
- Edited by: Cordula Werner, Karin Hammer, Alarich Lenz, Daniel Prochaska
- Music by: Karwan Marouf
- Release date: January 17, 2019 (Austria)
- Running time: 93 minutes
- Country: Austria
- Languages: German, Russian

Caviar (German: Kaviar) is a 2019 Austrian comedy film directed by Elena Tikhonova. The premiere took place on January 17, 2019, as part of the Max Ophüls Prize film festival in Saarbrücken, where the film won the Audience Award for Feature Film. The Austrian cinema release took place on June 13, 2019. The film was released in cinemas in Germany on July 4, 2019. The film was first broadcast on ORF on July 9, 2021.

== Plot ==
Nadja, hailing from Russia, resides in Vienna, employed as an interpreter for the oligarch Igor. Despite Igor's grandiose plan to construct a luxurious villa akin to Florence's Ponte Vecchio on the Schwedenbrücke, Nadja endeavors to dissuade him. Meanwhile, Nadja's confidante, Vera, inadvertently supports Igor's scheme through her Austrian husband Klaus, who betrays Nadja's trust. Sensing betrayal, Teresa, the nanny of Nadja's children, proposes gathering evidence of Igor and Klaus's misdeeds. Klaus capitulates to Igor's demands for funding and citizenship, unbeknownst to him that Teresa and Nadja are onto his schemes.

As the scandal unfolds, Vera uncovers Klaus's hidden wealth in Liechtenstein. Following Klaus's dismissal by Igor, a bribery scandal ensues, implicating Zech in the process. While Zech denies involvement, evidence mounts against him. Nadja plays a pivotal role in exposing the corruption, ultimately leading to Vera reclaiming the hidden millions. In the aftermath, they revel in their friendship and newfound prosperity.

== Cast ==
- Margarita Breitkreiz: Nadja
- Darya Nosik: Vera
- Sabrina Reiter: Teresa
- Mikhail Evlanov: Igor
- Georg Friedrich: Klaus
- Simon Schwarz: Ferdinand
- Joseph Lorenz: Stadtrat Hans Zech
- Robert Finster: Don
- Sonja Romei: urologist
- Christoph Dostal: neighbour
- David Oberkogler: policeman
- Susanne Gschwendtner: policewoman
- Lukas Johne: Leopold
- Aurelia Burckhardt: Liechtenstein bank teller
- Dominic Marcus Singer: border guard

== Production ==
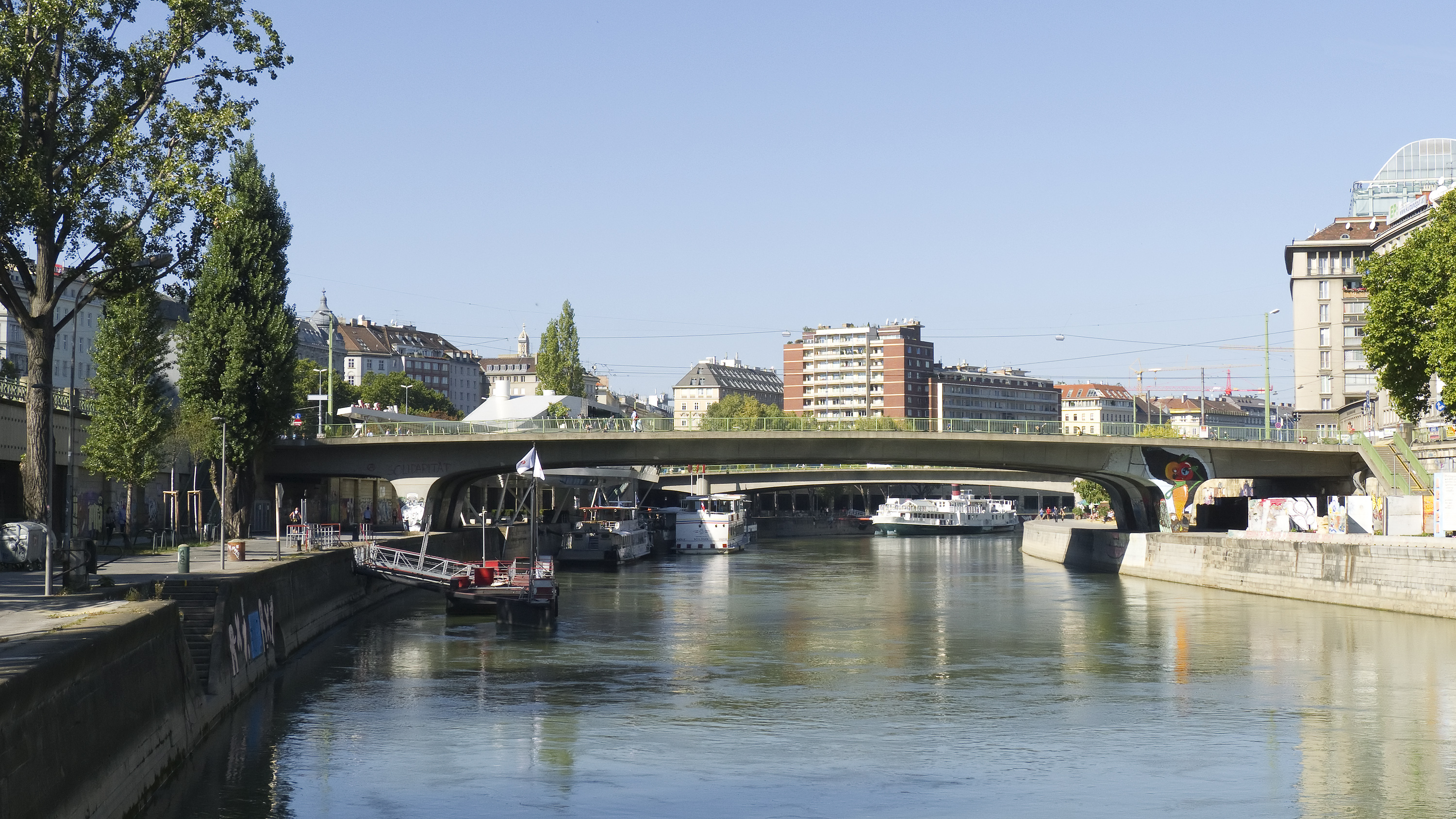
One of the filming locations: the Schwedenbrücke in Vienna

Filming took place in Vienna and Lower Austria in October and November 2016. The filming location included the Karl-Wrba-Hof in Favoriten.

The film was supported by the Austrian Film Institute, the Vienna Film Fund, Creative Europe MEDIA, the State of Lower Austria and Film Location Austria (FISA), and the Austrian Broadcasting Corporation was involved.

The film was produced by Witcraft Filmproduktion GmbH, Novotny & Novotny and MR Film. Sergey Martynyuk and Karim Weth were responsible for the audio and sound design, Theresa Ebner-Lazek was responsible for the costume design and Hannes Salat and Julia Oberndorfinger were responsible for the production design.

The film is the feature debut of director and screenwriter Elena Tikhonova, who was born in Obninsk and has lived in Vienna since 2000.

== Reception ==
The film received positive reviews from Austrian film critics. Furthermore, some critics highlighted how the Ibiza affair, which transpired later in May 2019, rendered the film even more timely.

== Awards and nominations ==
=== Film Festival Max Ophüls Prize 2019 ===
- Audience Award Feature Film

=== Film Festival Kitzbühel 2019 ===
- Award in the category Best Director (Elena Tikhonova)

=== Austrian Film Prize 2020 ===
- Nomination in the category Best Male Actor (Georg Friedrich)
- Nomination in the category Best Mask (Sam Dopona)
- Nomination in the category Best Music (Karwan Marouf)

== See also ==
- Elektro Moskva, a 2013 documentary film by Elena Tikhonova.
