= Clint Eastwood discography =

American actor and filmmaker Clint Eastwood, an audiophile, has had a strong passion for music all his life, particularly jazz, country and western music. He is a pianist and composer in addition to his main career as an actor, director, and film producer. He developed as a ragtime pianist early on, and in August 1962, the Cameo-Parkway Records label signed him to record some country-and-western songs. In September 1963, the album Rawhide's Clint Eastwood Sings Cowboy Favorites debuted to weak sales. Jazz has played an important role in Eastwood's life from a young age and although he was never successful as a musician, he passed on the influence to his son Kyle Eastwood, a successful jazz bassist and composer. Eastwood has his own Warner Bros. Records-distributed imprint, Malpaso Records, as part of his deal with Warner Brothers, which has released all of the scores of Eastwood's films from The Bridges of Madison County onward. Eastwood co-wrote "Why Should I Care" with Linda Thompson and Carole Bayer Sager, which was recorded by Diana Krall for the film True Crime (1999). "Why Should I Care" was also released on Krall's album When I Look in Your Eyes (also 1999).

Eastwood composed the film scores of Mystic River, Million Dollar Baby, Flags of Our Fathers, Grace Is Gone, Changeling, Hereafter, J. Edgar, and the original piano compositions for In the Line of Fire. One of his songs can be heard over the credits of Gran Torino.

== Albums ==
Title	Details
Rawhide's Clint Eastwood Sings Cowboy Favorites	Release date: 1963; Label: Cameo Records
Eastwood After Hours: Live at Carnegie Hall [2CD]	Release date: 1997; Label: Malpaso Records, Warner Bros. Records
Music for the Movies of Clint Eastwood	Release date: 2001; Label: Warner Bros. Records
The Singing Cowboys (Clint Eastwood & Frankie Laine) [2CD]	Release date: 2014; Label: Not Now Music

== Singles ==
Year	Single	Peak chart positions		Album
Year	Single	US Country	CAN Country	Album
1961	"Unknown Girl of My Dreams"	—	—	—N/a
1962	"Cowboy Wedding Song / Rowdy"	—	—	Rawhide's Clint Eastwood Sings Cowboy Favorites [Bonus Track]
1962	"Get Yourself Another Fool"	—	—	—N/a
1970	"I Talk to the Trees" (B-side only)	—	—	—N/a
1970	"Best Things" (B-side only)	—	—	—N/a
1970	"Burning Bridges"	—	—	—N/a
1980	"Bar Room Buddies" (with Merle Haggard)	1	1	Bronco Billy [Original Soundtrack]
1980	"Beers to You" (with Ray Charles)	55	—	Any Which Way You Can [Original Soundtrack]
1981	"Cowboy in a Three Piece Business Suit"	—	—	—N/a
2009	"Gran Torino" (as Walt Kowalski with Jamie Cullum)	—	—	The Pursuit
"—" denotes releases that did not chart

=== Guest singles ===
Year	Single	Artist	Peak chart positions			Album
Year	Single	Artist	US Country	US	CAN Country	Album
1984	"Make My Day"	T. G. Sheppard	12	62	11	Slow Burn
1990	"Smokin' the Hive" (B-side)	Randy Travis	*	—	*	Heroes & Friends

(*) "Smokin' the Hive" was the B-side of "A Few Ole Country Boys" (a duet with Travis and George Jones with no involvement from Eastwood), a record that hit number 8 on the U.S. country charts and number 4 on the Canadian charts.

== Other songs ==
Year	Song title	Release	Functioned as	Film	Album	Notes		
1961	"For All We Know"	Unknown Girl of My Dreams [EP]	Singer	Rawhide	The Singing Cowboys			
1962	"For You For Me for Evermore"	Get Yourself Another Fool [EP]	Singer	Rawhide	The Singing Cowboys			
1964	"Sweet Betsy from Pike"		Singer	A Fistful of Dollars		Uncredited		
1969	"I Still See Elisa"		Singer	Paint Your Wagon				
1969	"Gold Fever"		Singer	Paint Your Wagon				
1970	"When I Loved Her"	Burning Bridges [EP]	Singer	Kelly's Heroes				
1970	"Sam Hall"		Singer	Two Mules for Sister Sara				
1971	"Dove She is a Pretty Bird"		Singer	The Beguiled				
1981	"Dark Blue Feeling"	Cowboy in a Three Piece Business Suit [EP]	Singer	Bronco Billy				
1982	"When I Sing About You"		Singer	Honkytonk Man	Honkytonk Man [Original Soundtrack]			
1982	"Honkytonk Man"		Singer	Honkytonk Man	Honkytonk Man [Original Soundtrack]			
1982	"In the Jailhouse Now"		Singer	Honkytonk Man	Honkytonk Man [Original Soundtrack]	Duets with Marty Robbins		
1982	"No Sweeter Cheater Than You"		Singer	Honkytonk Man	Honkytonk Man [Original Soundtrack]			
1984	"Montage Blues"		Piano player	City Heat		Play with: Mike Lang and Pete Jolly		
1984	"Amanda's Theme"		Composer	Tightrope	Music for the movies of Clint Eastwood			
1986	"How Much I Care"		Composer	Heartbreak Ridge		Sung by Jill Hollier		
1992	"Claudia's Theme"		Composer	Unforgiven	Unforgiven [Original Soundtrack]			
1993	"Big Fran's Baby"		Composer	A Perfect World	A Perfect World [Original Soundtrack]			
1995	"Doe Eyes (Love Theme from The Bridges of Madison County)"		Composer	The Bridges of Madison County	The Bridges of Madison County [Original Soundtrack]			
1997	"Ac-Cent-Tchu-Ate the Positive"		Singer	Midnight in the Garden of Good & Evil	Midnight in the Garden of Good & Evil [Original Soundtrack]			
1997	"Power Waltz"		Composer	Absolute Power				
1997	"Kate's Theme"		Composer	Absolute Power	Composer	Absolute Power		Music for the Movies of Clint Eastwood
1997	"C. E. Blues"		Composer		Composer	Absolute Power	Eastwood After Hours: Live at Carnegie Hall	
1999	"Why Should I Care"		Composer	True Crime	Composer	True Crime [Original Soundtrack] When I Look in Your Eyes	Sung by Diana Krall	
2000	"ESPACIO"		Composer	Space Cowboys	Composer	Music for the Movies of Clint Eastwood		
2003	"Mystic River"		Composer	Mystic River	Composer	Mystic River [Original Soundtrack]		
2004	"Blue Morgan"		Composer	Million Dollar Baby	Composer	Million Dollar Baby [Original Soundtrack]		
2006	"Flags of Our Fathers"		Composer	Flags of Our Fathers	Composer	Flags of Our Fathers [Original Soundtrack]		
2007	"Grace Is Gone"		Composer	Grace Is Gone	Composer	Grace Is Gone [Original Soundtrack]		
2008	Compose by all songs		Composer	Changeling	Composer	Changeling [Original Soundtrack]		
2009	"9,000 Days"		Composer	Invictus	Composer	Invictus [Original Soundtrack]		
2010	Compose by all songs		Composer	Hereafter	Composer	Hereafter [Original Soundtrack]		
2011	Compose by all songs		Composer	J. Edgar	Composer	J. Edgar [Original Soundtrack]	Not released (promo only)	
2012	"You Are My Sunshine"		Singer	Trouble with the Curve	Composer			
2014	"Taya's Theme"		Composer	American Sniper	American Sniper [Original Soundtrack]			
2016	"Flying Home (Theme from Sully)"		Composer	Sully	Sully [Original Soundtrack]	Sung by The Tierney Sutton Band		

== Bibliography ==
- Hughes, Howard (2009). Aim for the Heart. London: I.B. Tauris. ISBN 978-1-84511-902-7.
- Levy, Shawn (2025). Clint: The Man and the Movies. HarperCollins. ISBN 9780063251021.
