= B. Bumble and the Stingers =

American instrumental ensemble of the 60s

- Origin: Los Angeles, California, United States
- Years active: 1961–1963
- Label: Rendezvous
- Past members: Ernie Freeman; Earl Palmer; Red Callender; Tommy Tedesco; Fred Richards; Don Orr; R.C. Gamble

B. Bumble and the Stingers was an American instrumental ensemble in the early 1960s, specializing in rock and roll arrangements of classical melodies. The band's biggest hits were "Bumble Boogie", which reached number 21 in the US, and "Nut Rocker", which reached number 23 in the US and number 1 in the UK Singles Chart in 1962. The recordings were made by session musicians at Rendezvous Records in Los Angeles. When their recordings became successful a touring group was formed, led by R. C. Gamble (3 November 1941 – 2 August 2008) as "Billy Bumble".

== Background ==
In 1959, Earl Palmer, René Hall, and Plas Johnson, all African American musicians from Louisiana, were the house band at Rendezvous Records. According to Palmer, the three friends “always talked about how we could make some money and not leave the studio. One day I said, 'Let's do a rock version of "In the Mood"'". The single, credited to the Ernie Fields Orchestra, became a hit, reaching number 4 on the US pop charts in early 1960.

== "Bumble Boogie" ==
Hall then came up with the idea for B. Bumble and the Stingers, taking the same approach to a piece of classical music. Prompted by record producer Kim Fowley, he approached pianist Jack Fina, whose 1946 swing arrangement of Rimsky-Korsakov's "Flight of the Bumble Bee" for Freddy Martin and his Orchestra, called "Bumble Boogie" (RCA Victor 20-1829), had reached number 7 on the chart and been used in the 1948 Walt Disney animated film Melody Time. Using Fina's arrangement, Fowley recorded pianist Ernie Freeman on two tracks, one using a grand piano for the rhythm part, while the other featured a "tack piano", a modified upright piano with tacks pressed into the hammers to create a tinny "honky tonk" sound. The other musicians on the session, at Gold Star Studios, were Palmer on drums, Red Callender on bass, and Tommy Tedesco on guitar.

"Bumble Boogie" went to number 21 on the Billboard charts in June 1961. Because the session musicians all had other studio commitments, a teen band from Ada, Oklahoma, who had played no part in the recording, was recruited to handle promotion and public appearances. Their names were given as Fred Richards, Don Orr, and "B. Bumble", a pseudonym for guitarist R. C. Gamble.

== "Nut Rocker" ==
Follow-up records "Boogie Woogie", with Freeman's tack piano double tracked, and "Caravan", were less successful, and Rendezvous seemed to lose interest in B. Bumble and the Stingers. Fowley then secured the copyright to an arrangement of the march from Tchaikovsky's ballet The Nutcracker, and took this to local entrepreneur and pianist H. B. Barnum, who recorded it under the name "Jack B. Nimble and the Quicks" on the small Del Rio label. When Rod Pierce of Rendezvous heard it, he convinced Fowley that his label could do a better version with their own band.

A recording date was quickly arranged, but on the day, Freeman did not appear. In his place, guitarist and arranger René Hall rushed pianist Al Hazan into the Rendezvous office, which was rigged up as an improvised studio. According to Hazan, "Rod decided to record the first take while I was still trying to practice the piece with the other musicians. Because I was so rushed to learn 'Nut Rocker', I was not happy at all with my performance on that first take. However, in spite of my asking Rod to let me do it over again, he said he liked it just fine the way it was." Released as "Nut Rocker" in February 1962, the record went to number 23 in the US and number 1 in the UK. Del Rio struck a deal with Randy Wood of Dot Records and re-released what they were now calling "(The Original) Nut Rocker" by Jack B. Nimble and the Quicks, but it was not a hit.

== Later releases and legacy ==
Such was "Nut Rocker"'s popularity in Britain that a touring group, with Hazan and R. C. Gamble, was flown over in October 1962 to promote the follow-up, "Apple Knocker", based on Rossini's William Tell Overture. However, neither that record nor the next release, "Dawn Cracker", based on "Morning Mood" from Peer Gynt by Grieg, was successful, and after another adaptation of a classical melody, "Baby Mash" (taken from Brahms' Lullaby), no more B. Bumble and the Stingers records were issued on Rendezvous after 1963, when that label went out of business. (Some singles were released on other labels, from 1964 to 1972.) Hall went on to work with Sam Cooke and many others, Palmer and Freeman were already successful session musicians, Fowley moved on to work as a producer and as svengali to the Runaways, and Hazan later recorded solo as Ali Hassan (on instrumentals) and Al Anthony (as a singer).

R. C. Gamble retired from music in 1965 and later became an economics professor at Fort Hays State College in Hayes, Kansas. He died on August 2, 2008.

A version of "Nut Rocker" (spelled "Nutrocker") was recorded in 1972 by Emerson, Lake & Palmer. The original version was reissued at the same time, and again made the UK chart (number 19). The recording has been used as background in several movies, including Butcher Boy (1998), The Young Poisoner's Handbook (1995), and Big Momma's House (2000).

A version of "Bumble Boogie" was recorded in Nashville in 1983 by Mike Bunis. It was released on Gold Coast Records. In addition to Bunis on piano, it featured Steve Phillips (guitar), Duane Dursma (bass), and Barry Byrd (drums). According to sources, it was recorded at Sound Control Studios on a Yamaha upright piano.

== Discography ==
=== Singles ===
Year	Title	Peak chart positions			Record Label	B-side
Year	Title	US Pop	CAN	UK	Record Label	B-side
1961	"Bumble Boogie"	21	5	—	Rendezvous	"School Day Blues"
1961	"Boogie Woogie"	89	—	—	Rendezvous	"Near You"
1961	"Bee Hive"	—	—	—	Rendezvous	"Caravan"
1962	"Nut Rocker"	23	—	1	Rendezvous	"Nautilus"
1962	"Rockin-On-'n'-Off"	—	—	—	Rendezvous	"Mashed #5"
1962	"Apple Knocker"	—	—	—	Rendezvous	"The Moon and the Sea"
1962	"Dawn Cracker"	—	—	—	Rendezvous	"Scales"
1962	"Canadian Sunset"	—	—	—	Rendezvous	"Twelfth Street Rag"
1962	"Baby Mash"	—	—	—	Rendezvous	"Night Time Madness"
1963	"In the Mood"	—	—	—	Rendezvous	"Chicken Chow Mein"
1966	"The Green Hornet Theme"	—	—	—	Mercury	"Flight of the Hornet"
1967	"Silent Movies"	—	—	—	Mercury	"Twelfth Street Rag"
