= Elena Tikhonova =

Austrian film director

- Born: June 1977 (age 48); Obninsk, RSFSR
- Occupations: Film director Screenwriter
- Years active: 2000–present

Elena Tikhonova (born June 1, 1977) is a film director, screenwriter, editor. Since 2000, Tikhonova lives and works in Vienna, Austria.

Tikhonova was born in Obninsk, RSFSR.

She studied at Moscow's film university VGIK, specializing in cinematography for both feature and documentary films. Her directorial debut came with the 2001 VGIK student film "Goodnight, constructor!", an experimental short, which she co-directed with Natalya Mitroshina. Tikhonova also served as the film's cinematographer. Its soundtrack, composed entirely of noise music by Vsevolod Grechenev, earned a diploma at the "Saint Anna" film festival. Filming began in Russia in 1998, and editing was completed in Austria.

Elena Tikhonova met her future husband, cinematographer Dominik Spritzendorfer, in 1997 when they both studied at VGIK. After they married, they moved to Austria and began their creative collaboration.

In 2013, Tikhonova, in collaboration with Dominik Spritzendorfer, directed the music documentary film Elektro Moskva about Soviet electronic music. The film received positive reviews from international critics.

In 2019, she directed the comedy film Caviar. The film received positive reviews from Austrian critics. For the film she won the Audience Award at the Max Ophüls Film Festival and the Best Director Award at Film Festival Kitzbühel.

== Other activities ==
Additionally, Tikhonova is active as a VJane under the pseudonym Mirniy Atom ("peaceful atom"), collaborating with various artists.
