= Mark Reay =

American fashion photographer, model, and actor

Mark Reay is an American fashion photographer, model, and actor who is best known as the subject of the 2014 documentary Homme Less.

== Career ==
In his mid 20s Reay worked as a model, walking runways for Versace. In 2007, he began working as a fashion photographer with his work appearing in magazines like Dazed & Confused as well as continuing to work as an actor and model.

=== Homme Less ===
In 2010, Reay reconnected with Thomas Wirthensohn a fellow model, turned filmmaker. After Reay confided to Wirthensohn that, despite his outwardly successful life and connections in the fashion industry, he was homeless and had been living on the rooftop of a friend's building since the summer of 2008, Wirthensohn and Reay decided to make a documentary on his life. The resulting documentary Homme Less premiered at the 2014 Kitzbuhel Film Festival. The film won the Grand Jury award at DOC NYC 2014 and Millennium award Brussels 2015 and was used by the band Mumford and Sons in a music video "Thompkins Square Park".

Reay was interviewed on/by "The View", BBC, The Daily Beast, Huffington Post, The Guardian, Haaretz, Q, Esquire (Russia) among others. As a result of the publicity surrounding Homme Less, Reay abandoned his rooftop abode and began living elsewhere.

He continues to work as photographer and actor in NYC.
