= Ernie Fields =

American trombonist, pianist, arranger and bandleader (1904–1997)

- Born: Ernest Lawrence Fields; August 28, 1904; Nacogdoches, Texas, U.S.
- Died: May 1, 1997 (aged 92) Tulsa, Oklahoma, U.S.
- Occupations: Trombonist, pianist, arranger, bandleader
- Instruments: Trombone, piano
- Years active: 1920s-1960s

Ernest Lawrence Fields (August 28, 1904 – May 11, 1997) was an American trombonist, pianist, arranger and bandleader. He first became known for leading the Royal Entertainers, a territory band which was based in Tulsa, Oklahoma, and toured along a circuit stretching from Kansas City, Kansas, to Dallas, Texas, and eventually across the US and parts of Canada. Later, he led a band that recorded in Los Angeles.

== Early life and career ==
Fields was born in Nacogdoches, Texas, and was raised in Taft, Oklahoma. He graduated from Tuskegee Institute in 1924 and then moved to Tulsa.

Over the course of his career, a number of musicians who were to become well known passed through his band. These included vocalist and drummer Roy Milton., Yusef Lateef, Booker Ervin, Rene Hall and Teddy Edwards ("Going Back to T-Town: The Ernie Fields Territory Big Band"] University of Oklahoma Press ISBN 978-0-8061-9184-3 hardcover)

From the late 1920s, he led a band called the Royal Entertainers, and eventually began touring more widely, and recording. Supported by Bob Wills, Fields' band became the first African-American band to play at the landmark Cain's Ballroom in Tulsa. In 1939, he was invited to New York City by John Hammond to record for the Vocalion label, and began to tour nationally. He did not become a star, but continued to work steadily, recording for smaller labels, and gradually transforming his sound through a smaller band and a repertoire shift from big band, swing to R&B. During World War II, he entertained troops both at home and abroad.

== Later career ==
He continued to straddle these styles into the 1950s, playing swing standards such as "Tuxedo Junction" and "Begin the Beguine" in a rocking R&B style. In the late 1950s he moved to Los Angeles, joining Rendezvous Records, for whom he ran the house band. This included pianist Ernie Freeman, guitarist Rene Hall (who had previously worked with Fields in the 1930s), saxophonist Plas Johnson, and drummer Earl Palmer. In 1959 this band had an international hit with an R&B version of Glenn Miller's "In the Mood", credited to the Ernie Fields Orchestra, which reached number 4 on the Billboard chart. The track also peaked at number 13 in the UK Singles Chart. It sold over one million copies, and was awarded a gold disc. The band, with minor changes of personnel, went on to record instrumentals under many different names, including B. Bumble and the Stingers, the Marketts and the Routers.

Rendezvous Records folded in late 1963, and Fields retired soon after and returned to Tulsa. He died in May 1997, at the age of 92. In 2013 his family donated his memorabilia to the planned Oklahoma Museum of Popular Culture.

His son is the saxophonist and bandleader Ernie Fields, Jr., and his daughter Carmen became a journalist in Boston, where she co-hosted the evening news for WGBH-TV.
