= The Rookie (1990 film) =

1990 film directed by Clint Eastwood

- Theatrical release poster
- Directed by: Clint Eastwood
- Written by: Boaz Yakin; Scott Spiegel
- Produced by: Howard G. Kazanjian; Steven Siebert; David Valdes
- Starring: Clint Eastwood; Charlie Sheen; Raul Julia; Sônia Braga
- Cinematography: Jack N. Green
- Edited by: Joel Cox
- Music by: Lennie Niehaus
- Production company: Malpaso Productions
- Distributed by: Warner Bros.
- Release date: December 7, 1990
- Running time: 120 minutes
- Country: United States
- Language: English
- Budget: $30 million
- Box office: $21.6 million

The Rookie is a 1990 American buddy cop action thriller film directed by Clint Eastwood, written by Boaz Yakin and Scott Spiegel, and produced by Howard G. Kazanjian, Steven Siebert, and David Valdes. It stars Eastwood, Charlie Sheen, Raul Julia, Sônia Braga, Lara Flynn Boyle, and Tom Skerritt. Eastwood plays a veteran police officer teamed with the rookie detective played by Sheen, whose intent is to take down a German crime lord in downtown Los Angeles, following months of investigation into an exotic car theft ring.

The Rookie premiered in the United States and Canada on December 7, 1990, grossing $21,633,874 in ticket receipts, just under its budget of $30 million. The film was overshadowed by the continuing success of Home Alone, which opened three weeks earlier and ended up being one of the top 100 highest-grossing films of all time. A financial disappointment, The Rookie was met with generally lackluster reviews. Critics considered it formulaic and shallow, and questioned the casting of the Puerto Rican Julia and the Brazilian Braga as Germans; a scene in which Eastwood was raped by Braga also generated some controversy.

== Plot ==
Veteran LAPD detective Nick Pulovski and his partner Powell attempt to bust a car theft ring loading a trailer with stolen luxury vehicles. In the ensuing shootout, Powell is killed. Pulovski pursues the fleeing truck, but the trailer is detached while he is on board.

The case is classified as a homicide and Pulovski is excluded from the investigation. He's assigned a new partner, "rookie" detective David Ackerman. Pulovski rebuffs orders and investigates the gang anyway. He and Ackerman track the criminal leader, Erich Strom, and his associate Liesl to a country club, where Pulovski confronts Strom. Later, they visit a bar to meet Felix, an informant. Ackerman gets in a brawl and has his badge is stolen before Pulovski defuses the fight. Felix points Pulovski to Strom's associate Morales.

The detectives force Morales to cooperate, and he places a bug in Strom and Liesl's house. However, a news report alerts Strom of an informant. Liesl beats Morales, and executes him.

Desperate for money, Strom holds up a casino. Having intercepted the plan through the wiretap, Pulovski and Ackerman ambush them inside the vault. During the confrontation, Liesl sees Ackerman's hands shake. She approaches him slowly. He hesitates to shoot. Liesl capitalizes on his hesitation, shoots him, and escapes with Strom, kidnapping Pulovski. Strom demands a $2,000,000 ransom. Ackerman who wore a bulletproof vest, survives. The police department refuses to pay the ransom, writing Pulovski off.

Determined to help his partner, Ackerman returns to the bar, wrecks it and demands information. He tracks Felix to his dry cleaners. Ackerman arrives just after a thug named Loco strangled Felix for snitching. Loco assaults Ackerman and escapes. Ackerman goes to his wealthy father asking for $2,000,000. Meanwhile Liesl and Pulovski are alone. She sexually assaults the bound and helpless detective until both reach orgasm.

Ackerman calls his girlfriend Sarah. She tells him the cops are looking for him. Lieutenant Garcia is waiting in their home. After the call two detectives attempt to arrest Ackerman. They claim Garcia is at headquarters. Realizing Garcia is not with Sarah, Ackerman manages to escape. He crashes a motorcycle through the front door. Loco is strangling Sarah. Ackerman intervenes but is losing the fight. Sarah picks up a dropped pistol and shoots Loco dead. Angered, thinking his only lead lost, Ackerman nevertheless comforts Sarah. Loco's car reminds him of one seen in a garage. He goes there hoping to find Pulovski.

In the warehouse, Pulovski knocks Liesl unconscious, and strangles a mechanic, Max. Max and Pulovski fall down an elevator shaft. Liesl awakens and traps Pulovski in the elevator shaft. Ackerman arrives, sparking a firefight with Strom. The criminals flee downstairs, while Pulovski escapes a detonated bomb by driving a convertible out of a warehouse window.

Pulovski and Ackerman hijack a van with Cruz who Strom sent to the ransom exchange. Cruz drives the detectives to the airport where Strom and Liesl wait aboard a private plane with pilot Ken Blackwell. Strom kills Cruz. A shootout and chase begins. Pulovski and Ackerman kill Ken Blackwell. His plane explodes when it collides into a jumbo jet. Running into a building past the tarmac, Liesl separates from Strom. Ackerman pursues and kills Liesl in the terminal. Pulovski pursues and kills Strom. Sometime later in the police station, Pulovski is promoted to lieutenant. He assigns Ackerman a rookie, Heather Torres.

== Cast ==
- Clint Eastwood as Sergeant Nick Pulovski
- Charlie Sheen as Detective David Ackerman
  - Seth Allen as Young David Ackerman
- Raul Julia as Erich Strom
- Sônia Braga as Liesl
- Tom Skerritt as Eugene Ackerman
- Lara Flynn Boyle as Sarah Ackerman
- Pepe Serna as Lieutenant Raymond Garcia
- Donna Mitchell as Laura Ackerman
- Coleby Lombardo as Joey Ackerman
- Marco Rodriguez as "Loco" Martinez
- Xander Berkeley as Ken Blackwell
- Roberta Vasquez as Officer Heather Torres
- Hal Williams as Detective Powell
- Paul Ben-Victor as Felix "Little Felix"
- Tony Plana as Morales
- David Sherrill as Max
- Pete Randall as Cruz
- Matt McKenzie as Detective Wang
- Joel Polis as Detective Lance
- Robert Harvey as Detective Whalen
- George Orrison as Detective Orrison
- Paul Butler as Captain Hargate
- Anthony Charnota as Romano
- Nick Ballo as Vito
- Jay Boryea as Sal
- Anthony Alexander as Alphonse
- Jeanne Mori as Reporter Connie Ling
- Jordan Lund as The Bartender
- Kyle Eastwood as Band Member at Ackerman's House Party (uncredited)

== Production ==
=== Sets and equipment ===
Within California, filming was done primarily on location in Saratoga, San Jose and Los Angeles. Various filming sites included Interstate 680 and State Route 87 in San Jose for the opening chase sequence featuring the semi-tractor trailer, the famous Villa Montalvo mansion for the henchmen meeting scene in the Santa Cruz Mountains of Saratoga, and the San Jose International Airport as well as the Mojave Air & Space Port for the final action climax scene, which author Laurence F. Knapp described as "both purgative and objectionable—a vivid, personal exchange of camera angles and vantage points that complicate, rather than conclude." A furniture warehouse on the corner of 4th and Hewitt streets in downtown Los Angeles, stood in as the hideaway for Strom's illegal theft operation. But in relation to same hideaway's demise later in the film, a different building was used in the City of Commerce. A warehouse previously occupied by an auto agency slated for demolition on Flower near 12th Street, stood in for the impending explosion-filled destruction. During an introductory scene, where Eastwood's character pulls up in an unmarked squad car to foil the plans of the car thieves, a z-shaped thoroughfare called Santa Fe Street, provided the perfect secluded background at night which also happened to overlook the Los Angeles skyline. For the action sequences involving aircraft at the San Jose airport, a Hansa twin-engine jet was used to collide with a Convair 880 that was briefly disguised as a 150-passenger Evergreen International Airlines Boeing 727.

In keeping with the continuity of the subject matter and storyline, the filming was punctuated with the use—and in some cases the destruction—of expensive and alluring foreign automobiles; including a Ferrari Daytona, a Porsche 928, a Jaguar XJ, as well as brief appearances of a Cadillac Allanté and a Rolls-Royce Silver Spirit. A vintage gull-wing Mercedes-Benz 300SL is also presented in the film, being personally driven by Braga's character in an introductory sequence before a large-scale climactic car chase scene. In addition to driving a newly redesigned Mercedes-Benz 500SL for the 1990 model year, Eastwood's character is also seen conveying his distaste for the Lime Green color on the Lotus Esprit and later driving said vehicle during a criminal pursuit. Sheen's character also takes part in a scene involving an older, rare Harley-Davidson, riding head-on through the front door of a residential home.

=== Filming ===
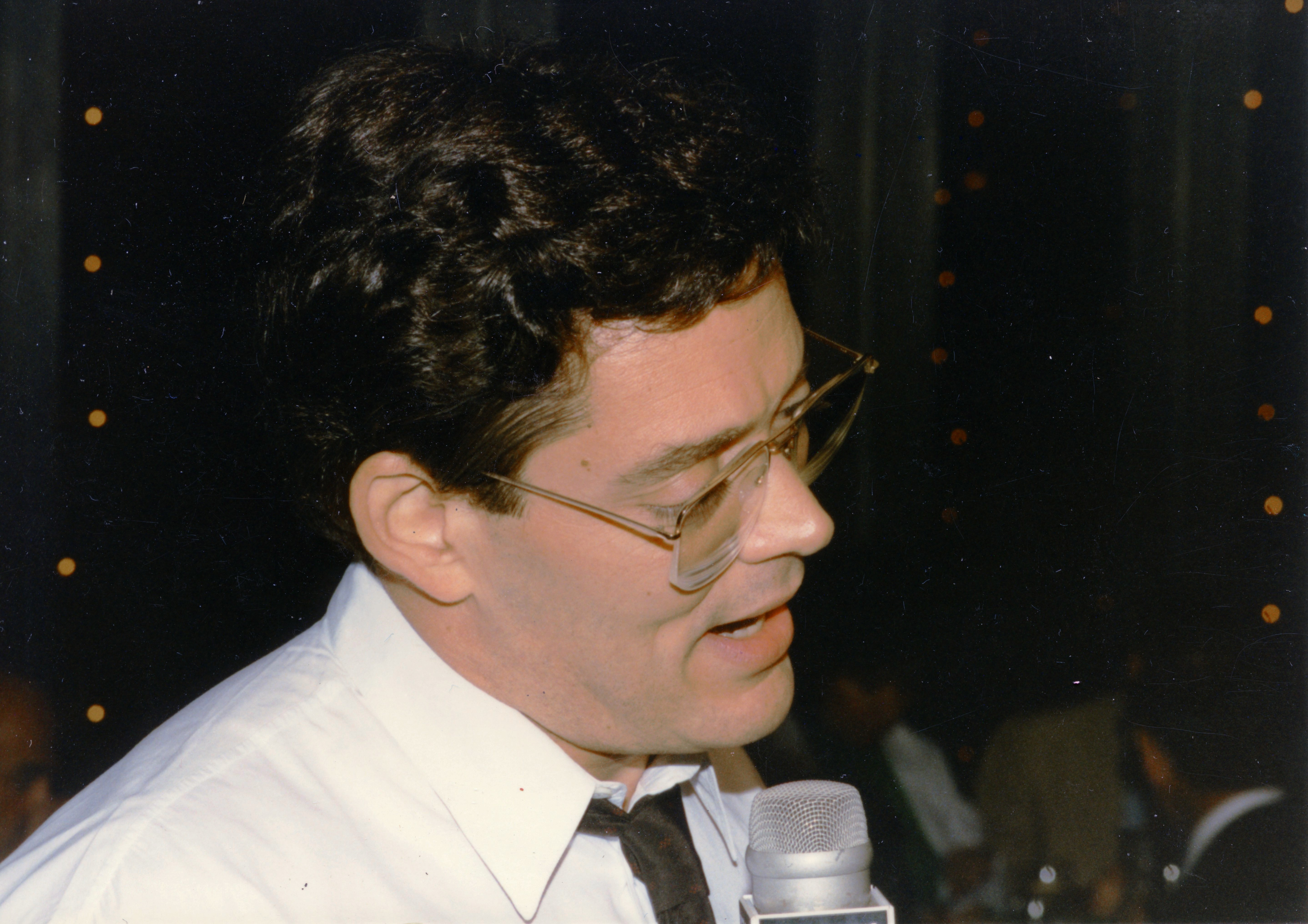
Raul Julia, who portrayed Strom. Though his performance in the film was praised, his casting as the German crime lord, as well as Sonia Braga's casting as Liesl, came as a surprise to critics and audiences alike.

Coordination of the lighting along with the capturing of all other photographic elements in the film were achieved by cinematographer Jack N. Green. Stunt coordinator Terry Leonard and second unit director Buddy Van Horn, oversaw the task of integrating the scope of stunt people working to produce the action which numbered over twice as many actors in the film (said to be over 80 stuntmen), while supervisor John Frazier controlled the special effects. Green, Van Horn, Leonard, Frazier, and production manager Valdez began close pre-production discussions three months before principal photography. To meet his stylistic lighting objectives in shaping the scenery environment, Green used powerful Musco Lighting developed during the 1980s. Commenting on a production scene surrounding the character of Pulovski at his residence, Green noted the home was characteristic of "359 degrees" of accessible turns of the camera. He detailed how the crew would "go in with these little ceiling units, as close to the ceiling as we could get them, little accent lights onto the place the actors would be. It would look like it was coming from those practicals but, again, at a dramatic angle."

Describing a stunt-related sequence early in the film performed by Eastwood, Van Horn, who had been a stunt associate for almost 35 years, took the opportunity to commend the actor on his contributions saying, "Clint likes to do everything live, ... When you read the script, you know everything is going to be pretty much live action. Sometimes you have to talk him out of something that just might be a little too risky. Not that he couldn't do it, but if something even minor should happen, you couldn't afford to suspend the production." The sequence which Van Horn alluded to, was a scene that involved Eastwood behind the driver's seat racing a Chevrolet Blazer through stop-and-go traffic, while swerving to avoid oncoming cars from the opposite direction. The scene included 20 other stunt drivers operating a carefully rehearsed formation through a head-on collision course. According to Van Horn, who engineered the sequence with Leonard, he noted, "The whole thing is like a football play, ... We all sit down and figure out where the cars are, where Clint makes the break out of traffic, where the other cars are going, and just the whole cause and effect for how and why he pulls into (the intersection) and decides to head on through. That's all worked out ahead of time." Leonard added, "In a situation where your rehearsal time is extremely limited, it becomes that old expression: experience, ... It becomes a seat of the pants kind of thing, about 20 drivers and Clint who know where the close calls are going to be and who's going to be in what position when. But once you get going, there's always the element of surprise, where maybe a car is 10 feet closer than it was expected to be, and a driver must react to that."

Certain critics such as author Daniel O'Brien, failed to understand why director Eastwood used Hispanic actors Julia and Braga, to portray German villains. Puzzled, he mused, "Why Eastwood thought that the Puerto Rican Julia and the Brazilian Braga would make convincing German schweinehund is difficult to determine, with Braga in particular suffering the indignities of awful dialogue ..." In summing up the filming experience, Frazier said, "You know, things went really well, but you have to give credit to everyone involved. Clint Eastwood and David Valdez really gave us the time and their confidence to do it right. We were never really rushed, which is so important. We were able to do every one of the major shots in one take: the car out of the building, the carrier turning over and the planes colliding. That says something. These guys respect the crew and every job being done. It makes a big difference."

"Why Eastwood thought that the Puerto Rican Juliá and the Brazilian Braga would make convincing German schweinehund is difficult to determine, with Braga in particular suffering the indignities of awful dialogue."
—Daniel O'Brien, author

In an interview with Orange Coast Magazine, co-star Braga confessed she had "never done action before" in film, while also stating, "I had to learn running and kicking and hitting." Under Eastwood's direction, Braga commented, "When you act with the director, you don't have any barriers because you're giving and taking at the same time." On a separate note, author Marc Eliot described the graphic rape scene in the film that gained much publicity as "an explosive sequence, and the only one in the film that people talked about. As obviously provocative and exploitative as it was, ars gratia artis the scene may also be read as conveying Clint's feeling victimized at the hands of a beautiful but bad woman." Offering another take on the scene, author John H. Foote noticed, "Braga looks somewhat embarrassed during the rape sequence, leaving us to wonder why Eastwood the director did not handle the sequence in a different manner. Was he hoping that the film would offer audiences something new?" Author Douglas Thompson bluntly referred to the rape scene as "sadomasochistic" and Braga as a "kinky nymphomaniac ... before she rapes Eastwood she plays around his chest with a razor blade, then gets into torrid action." Author Howard Hughes indicated that the event was one of Eastwood's "most distasteful scenes in [his] entire career".

=== Stunts ===
The major stunt scenes were executed before the camera with no miniatures, no blue screens, while mostly being shot at night. Completed during May 1990, the centerpiece stunt of the film involved a Mercedes-Benz convertible driving through the fourth-floor window of an exploding warehouse. For the scene, a 1,500 pound Mercedes auto mock-up was connected by 150 feet of quarter-inch pulleyed cable to a Ford 4×4 pickup on the ground. The truck would drive straight ahead and pull the Mercedes through the windows as the cable that connected the two vehicles exhibited a tensile strength of 8,000 pounds. Once the pull on the cable started, both vehicles would move in precise proportion to one another. After the mock-up launched through the windows, the hook connecting the Mercedes would drop. As Frazier explained, "The hook is very similar to the kind used to launch jets on aircraft carriers, ... Once the hook falls away, the Mercedes is propelled by its own momentum." Aerodynamics played a key role in the execution, as Frazier referred to the stunt saying, "When the car left the building it was very important that it exit and travel flat, ... A lot of times it doesn't matter. In this case, if the car didn't travel flat, you would know that the car could not have survived into the next sequence where it landed on the rooftop. We had to set up aerodynamics on that car, so that every time it went out the window, including the tests, it flew out without the nose dipping down." The explosion filled destruction of the warehouse was produced by 9 separate 18-inch steel mortars on each of the 4 floors. When fully discharged, all 36 mortars produced the largest orchestrated explosion ever allowed in Los Angeles city limits permitted at the time.

"When the car left the building it was very important that it exit and travel flat, ... A lot of times it doesn't matter. In this case, if the car didn't travel flat, you would know that the car could not have survived into the next sequence where it landed on the rooftop. We had to set up aerodynamics on that car, so that every time it went out the window, including the tests, it flew out without the nose dipping down."
—John Frazier, stunt supervisor

Another major stunt sequence consisted of a 50-foot-long (15 m), 21-ton two-tiered automobile carrier flipping over on its side, flinging its automotive cargo onto a freeway of traffic. In the sequence, the carrier is scripted to disconnect from the primary cab at highway speed, so that the carrier veers off to one side while eventually flipping over. Frazier explained how "Clint did not want the car carrier rolling over and over down the freeway, ... He just wanted it to go over on its side and then slide until it stopped. It would have been easier to load that thing up (with cars), get up to speed and 'barrel' roll it down the freeway. But it wouldn't have looked realistic for his character to have survived it." A semi-truck which was trailing 150 feet behind the carrier, held on to it by means of a cable. After the carrier became detached from the passenger cab, the semi-truck came to a stop yanking the carrier from the cab. Frazier demonstrated how gravity played a significant and key role during the scene. He noted, "By itself, the carrier would not have come off the (cab), ... It could ride there forever, even though it's been released, just due to the weight of the carrier. So we needed the 'holdback' cable to the truck behind, and on cue, the driver locked his brakes." After the carrier disengaged from the cab, steel castor wheels attached to the underside of the carrier directed it to the center embankment. A stuntman who was riding in the carrier fired 3 cannons to physically lift it over on its side.

A small jet aircraft, (Hansa-Jet), pursuing the lead characters played by Eastwood and Sheen, complements another tightly coordinated stunt scene (aerial coordinators James W. Gavin and Eric W. Gray). After chasing the two detectives through a grassy area, the Hansa-Jet is hit by a Convair 880 depicted as landing, (the initial sequence showing the aircraft on approach uses a BAe 146). Both the San Jose and Mojave airports were scripted as LA International Airport during filming of the scene. Right before the impact, the Hansa-Jet was actually stationary being pulled by a 150-foot steel cable attached to a 4-wheel drive pickup truck right before the explosion erupted. Frazier explained, "The reason we did that is because if the planes collide first, it's likely they'll upend all our wires and the explosion wouldn't occur at all. Another reason is that had the Hansa-Jet not demolished before impact, it could have spun the other plane around, and we might have ended up with the 880 in our shot instead. The ensuing explosion after the Convair dissects the Hansa-Jet was powered by 10 gallons of gasoline and 4 separate 18-inch mortars. The detonation device included a 125-foot electrical cable set off by a bull switch to help achieve the desired effect.

=== Music ===
The score for the film which included elements of jazz music and considerable use of the trumpet, was originally composed by American saxophonist Lennie Niehaus. The music score was mixed by Robert Fernandez and edited by Donald Harris. The sound effects in the film were supervised by Robert G. Henderson and Alan Robert Murray. The mixing of the sound effects were orchestrated by Donald F. Johnson and Michael Evje. Although not officially released, music from the soundtrack included songs entitled "All the Things You Are" written by Jerome Kern and Oscar Hammerstein II as well as the "Red Zone" written by Kyle Eastwood and Michael Stevens.

== Reception ==
=== Critical response ===
The film received mostly negative reviews from critics. On the review aggregator website Rotten Tomatoes, 31% of 16 critics' reviews are positive, with an average rating of 5.1/10. Audiences polled by CinemaScore gave the film an average grade of "B" on an A+ to F scale.

Among the reviews, Roger Ebert of the Chicago Sun Times, mildly complimented the stunts and special effects mentioning, "There are some good ones, including a chase down an expressway, with Eastwood driving his car right up the loading ramp of a semi auto-carrier" and noting that the film was "... jammed with material and the budget was obviously large, but somehow not much pays off. It's all there on the screen, but lifeless." On another negative front, Ebert also criticized Sheen's performance, saying he kept "a poker face and laconic voice through much of the movie, and doesn't generate the kind of vigor and intensity the role needs; a more nervous actor might have been a better choice." Ebert's partner Gene Siskel voiced his agreement; "It's a very depressing experience. Everyone's wasted in the film. The Latino stereotypes, when they get out on the street, are just awful." He went on to state, "... nobody has a good role. Raul Julia is wasted, Sônia Braga is tawdry. This was gonna be a classy international star, it's a joke." Hal Hinson of the The Washington Post solidly concurred saying, "Eastwood runs his patented American macho numbers, plays the same limited repertoire of squints, but he's gotten way too long in the tooth to pull them off and the thrill is long gone." Incidentally, another The Washington Post staff writer Desson Howe, dismissed the film as well. He openly wondered whether the film "will have something original about it. Maybe there's a twist somewhere, something to set it apart from the 20,595 other buddies-in-uniform movies made in recent years." In contrast with the buddy film genre though, Pat Collins of WWOR-TV, enthusiastically proclaimed the film to be "The best buddy cop movie of the year." The Variety staff however, added to the general dismay with the film saying, "Overlong, sadistic and stale even by the conventions of the buddy pic genre, Clint Eastwood's The Rookie is actually Dirty Harry 5 1/2 since Eastwood's tough-as-nails cop Nick Pulovski could just as easily be named Harry Callahan, ..."

"Clint Eastwood's new film, 'The Rookie,' plays like an anthology of stuff that has worked before in action pictures. It's jammed with material and the budget was obviously large, but somehow not much pays off. It's all there on the screen, but lifeless."
—Roger Ebert, writing in The Chicago Sun Times

Vincent Canby of The New York Times, expressed his dissatisfaction with the film too. He mused, "The Rookie is an astonishingly empty movie to come from Mr. Eastwood. The screenplay for The Rookie seems to have been pumped up from a script originally intended as a segment for a half-hour television series. There's not much of a story." He wasn't impressed with the special effects either saying, "the movie devotes itself to extended set pieces, mostly chases, which are so lazily thought out and edited that the audience is always ready for the twists that are supposed to surprise." Also in regards to the stunt work, author MK of Time Out in London commented, the "movie is full of caricatured cops and robbers, and punctuated with interminably dull car-chases." Alternatively though, Dave Kehr of the Chicago Tribune felt the quality of the stunt work was superb, commenting that they were, "the most spectacular action sequences Eastwood has ever filmed." Noted critic Leonard Maltin gave the film a star and a half, somewhat approving of the stuntwork by figuratively mentioning, "there's one good freeway crackup" but in the end, felt the theme amounted to "Formula filmmaking that even bored its intended audience."

Other movie critics, like Jeffrey Lyons of WPIX, applauded the performances of the lead characters and called the film "Tough and gritty. Fires with a full clip. Eastwood and Sheen are terrific together." Equally swayed in opinion was film critic Susan Granger of American Movie Classics: "This slam-bam, action-packed thriller packs a wallop." Giving the film a C+ rating, critic Owen Gleiberman from Entertainment Weekly posted, "The Rookie is like a series of garish exploitation set pieces jammed into the shape of a buddy movie." He went further in his criticism saying, "as moviemaking goes, The Rookie is on the slovenly side. The plot makes almost no sense, and Eastwood directs in his usual toneless fashion." But on a lighter note, relating to the film's comedic appeal, he stated, "in this case, the fact that you can't always tell the intentional comedy from the unintentional isn't necessarily a drawback." In agreement on the lack of plausibility surrounding the plot, author Marshall Julius still offered though an almost entirely positive review, giving the film three and a half guns, exclaiming, "As directed by Eastwood, The Rookie is a deliberately silly, knockabout adventure which aims for outrageous and hits a bullseye. We're talking good, dumb, fun. Get your brains out and the beers in, and you're all set."

=== Box office ===
The film premiered in cinemas on December 7, 1990. At its widest distribution in the U.S., the film was screened at 1,862 theaters grossing $5,510,056 in its opening weekend. During that first weekend in release, the film opened in third place behind Home Alone and Misery. The film's revenue dropped by 36% in its second week of release, earning $3,512,765. During its final weekend showing in theaters, the film grossed $1,224,696. The film went on to top out at $21,633,874 in total ticket sales through a 5-week theatrical run. For 1990 as a whole, the film would cumulatively rank at a box office performance position of 56.

=== Home media ===
The film was initially released in VHS video format on May 27, 1992. The Region 1 Code widescreen edition of the film was released on DVD in the United States on September 2, 2003, and includes a digital transfer soundtrack remastered in Dolby Digital 5.1, interactive menus, Eastwood film highlights, scene access, and the theatrical trailer. The film was released on Blu-ray Disc on June 1, 2010.

=== Novelization ===
In January 1991, a novelization based on the screenplay was released. Distributed by Warner Books, it was written by Tom Philbin.
