= Million Dollar Baby (soundtrack) =

Million Dollar Baby (Original Motion Picture Soundtrack)

Film score by Clint Eastwood
- Released: March 1, 2005
- Recorded: 2004
- Studio: Eastwood Scoring Stage, Warner Bros. Studios, Burbank, California
- Genre: Film score
- Length: 62:22
- Label: Varèse Sarabande
- Producer: Clint Eastwood

Clint Eastwood chronology
Mystic River (2003)	Million Dollar Baby (2004)	Flags of Our Fathers (2006)

Million Dollar Baby (Original Motion Picture Soundtrack) is the film score to the 2004 film Million Dollar Baby directed and produced by Clint Eastwood, who also starred in the lead role alongside Hilary Swank and Morgan Freeman. Besides acting, directing and producing, Eastwood also composed the film score. It was performed by the Hollywood Studio Symphony and conducted by Lennie Niehaus. Varèse Sarabande released the score album on March 1, 2005.

== Background ==
Clint Eastwood composed the film score, in his sophomore film composition stint after Mystic River (2003). The score was conducted by Lennie Niehaus, who had composed for most of Eastwood's films and is performed by the Hollywood Studio Symphony. The album was not issued during the film's release, until Varèse Sarabande distributed the soundtrack CDs on March 1, 2005, two days after the 77th Academy Awards, where the film received four awards including Best Picture. According to Cate Doty, the album "could not benefit from an immediate sales increase driven by the film's nomination for best picture."

== Critical reception ==
Calling the score "quietly affecting as the film", AllMusic noted it to be "gentle and unobtrusive, but deeply cut with melancholy and despair" and noted on how Eastwood's work resembled John Carpenter, on not letting the visuals be overwhelmed by the music. Rafael Ruiz of Soundtrack.net, responded negatively as it noted the gradual decline of quality in Eastwood's music, noting the lack of development in the themes he composed. Todd McCarthy of Variety wrote "Eastwood himself has provided a score notable for spare simplicity." Paul Clinton of CNN wrote "The score—simple and unadorned—mirrors both the script and the direction." Christopher Orr of The Atlantic called it a "haunting, minimalist piano score".

== Track listing ==
No.	Title	Length
1.	"Blue Morgan" (Opening Titles)	0:40
2.	"It's Nice Viewing"	0:57
3.	"Boxing Baby"	2:25
4.	"Boxing Montage"	2:44
5.	"Pick Up Money"	0:57
6.	"Nice Working with You"	1:37
7.	"The Letters"	1:20
8.	"Blue Diner"	3:35
9.	"Deep in Thought"	1:53
10.	"Driving"	1:38
11.	"Blue Bear"	0:43
12.	"Frankie Horrified"	1:07
13.	"They're Amateurs"	1:16
14.	"May Have to Lose It"	1:08
15.	"Maggie's Plea"	2:56
16.	"Frankie's Dillema"	1:09
17.	"Frankie's Decision"	1:09
18.	"Lethal Dose"	1:57
19.	"Frankie's Office"	1:05
20.	"Blue Morgan" (End Credits)	4:29
Total length:		34:45

== Personnel ==
Credits adapted from liner notes:

- Music composer and producer – Clint Eastwood
- Arrangements – Gennady Loktionov
- Orchestra – Hollywood Studio Symphony
- Orchestrator and conductor – Lennie Niehaus
- Chorus – Tanglewood Festival Chorus
- Recording and mixing – Bobby Fernandez
- Mastering – Erick Labson
- Executive producer – Robert Townson
- Musicians
- Bass – Arni Egilsson, Drew Dembowski
- Cello – Armen Ksajikian, Dane Little, Roger Lebow, Trevor Handy
- Guitar – Bruce Forman
- Piano – Michael Lang
- Viola – Dan Neufeld, Janet Lakatos, Pamela Goldsmith, Roland Kato
- Violin – Bruce Dukov, Darius Campo, David Ewart, Gil Romero, Jackie Brand, Julie Gigante, Katia Popov, Michael Ferril, Mike Markman, Patricia A. Johnson, Phillip Levy, Robin Olson

== Accolades ==
Awards	Date of ceremony	Category	Recipient(s)	Result	Ref.
Golden Globe Awards	January 16, 2005	Best Original Score	Clint Eastwood	Nominated	
Grammy Awards	February 8, 2006	Best Score Soundtrack Album for Motion Picture, Television, or Other Visual Media	Clint Eastwood	Nominated	
San Diego Film Critics Society	December 21, 2004	Best Score	Clint Eastwood	Won	
