= Homme Less =

2014 film

Homme Less is a 2014 documentary on fashion photographer and former model Mark Reay. The film was the feature debut of director Thomas Wirthenson, a former model. The documentary premiered at the 2014 Kitzbuehel Film Festival and later played at DOC NYC where it won the Metropolis Grand Jury Prize.

The film was acquired by Abramorama and given a limited theatrical release in August 2015.

== Production ==
Wirthenson and Reay were long-time acquaintances who had met while modelling. After reconnecting with Wirthenson in 2010, Reay confessed over drinks that despite maintaining an active life, working and appearing outwardly successful he was actually homeless and had been for some time. Wirthenson persuaded Reay to allow him to film him as the subject of a documentary.
