= Kyle Eastwood =

American jazz bassist and composer (born 1968)

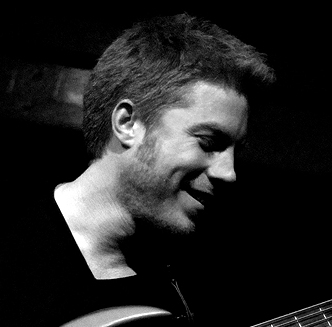
- Eastwood in 2005

Background information
- Born: May 19, 1968 (age 58); Los Angeles, California, U.S.
- Genre: Jazz
- Occupations: Musician; composer; actor
- Instruments: Double bass; bass guitar
- Years active: 1976–present
- Label: Rendezvous
- Website: kyleeastwood.com

Kyle Eastwood (born May 19, 1968) is an American jazz bassist, film composer and actor. He studied film at the University of Southern California for two years before embarking on a music career. After becoming a session player in the early 1990s and leading his own quartet, he released his first solo album, From There to Here, in 1998. His album The View from Here was released in 2013 by Jazz Village. In addition to his solo albums, Eastwood has composed music for nine of his father Clint Eastwood's films. Eastwood plays fretted and fretless electric bass guitar and double bass.

== Early life ==
Kyle Clinton Eastwood was born on May 19, 1968, the son of Margaret Neville Eastwood (née Johnson) (1931–2026) and actor-director Clint Eastwood. He has a sister, Alison, who was born in 1972. He also has six known paternal half-siblings, including Scott Eastwood and Francesca Eastwood.

== Career ==
=== Music ===
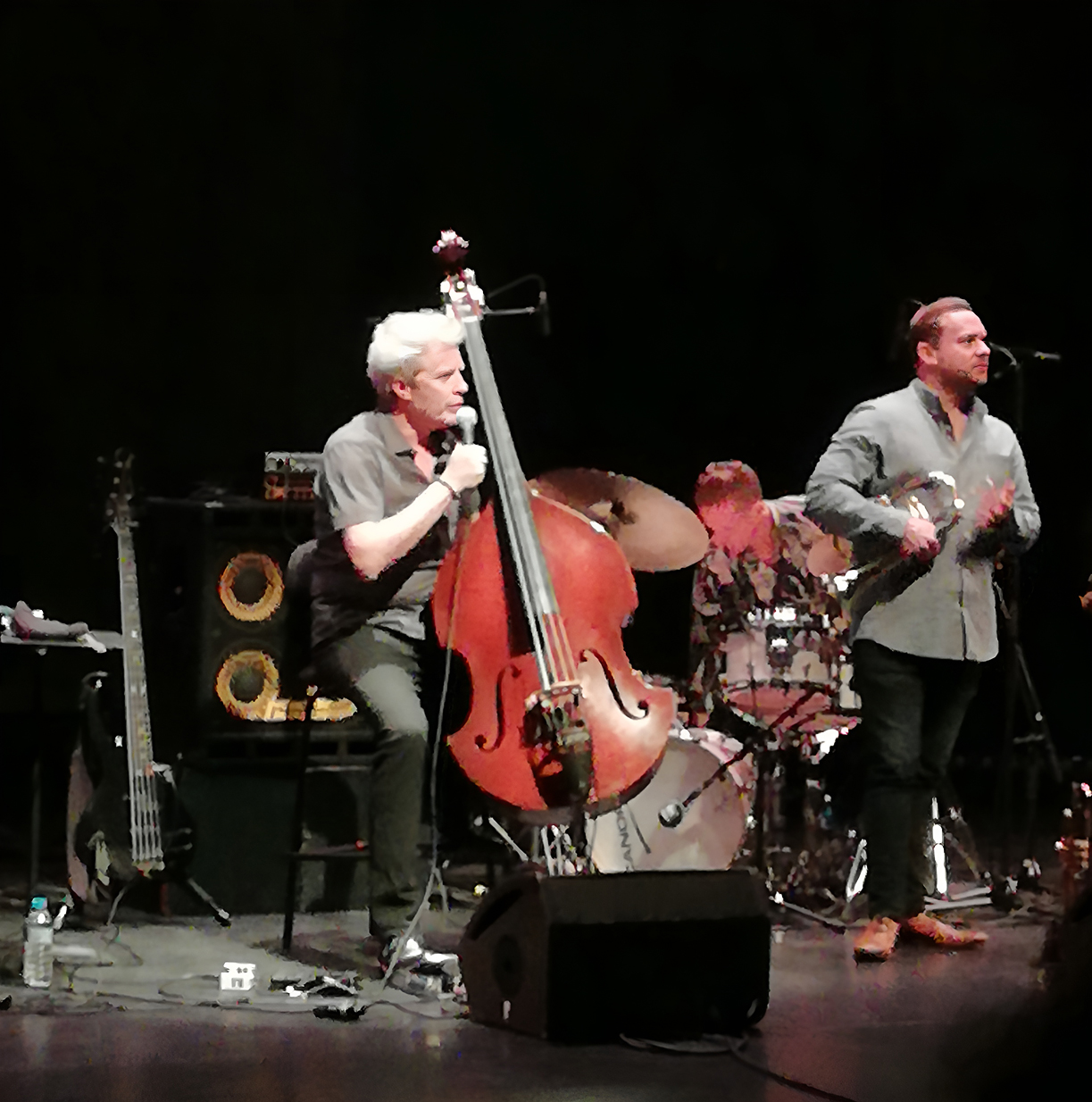
Eastwood in 2022

Eastwood comes from a musical family, as noted in an October 27, 2006, article from The Independent newspaper:

When I told my father, film actor/director Clint Eastwood, I wanted to be a musician, he was happy about it. Music has always been important to my family. My parents gave me my taste in music and my love of jazz from an early age. My father plays piano, my mother used to play, and my mother's mother was a music teacher at Northwestern University in Illinois.

Music was prominent in the Eastwood home. According to his biography with Hopper Management, Eastwood grew up listening to records by jazz legends such as Miles Davis, Dave Brubeck, Thelonious Monk, and the Stan Kenton Big Band with his parents, who were both jazz lovers. Eastwood attended the Monterey Jazz Festival numerous times with his parents. "One advantage of having a famous father was I got to go backstage," Eastwood explained in an interview conducted by stepmother Dina Ruiz Eastwood. "I met a lot of artists, greats like Dizzy Gillespie and Sarah Vaughan. Looking back on that, I can see how much the musicians I met there influenced my career."

Eastwood began playing bass guitar in high school, learning R&B, Motown, and reggae tunes by ear. After studying with French bassist Bunny Brunel, he began playing gigs in New York City and Los Angeles, forming the Kyle Eastwood Quartet, which contributed to Eastwood After Hours: Live at Carnegie Hall (1996), a concert in honor of Clint Eastwood and his dedication to jazz. Clint Eastwood has always been supportive of, and interested in, Kyle's work, as Eastwood told The Independent: "As far as my father is concerned, as long as I was serious about my music career, he was supportive of me."

Two years later, in 1998, Sony released his first album, From There to Here, a collection of jazz standards and original compositions. After signing with the UK's Candid Records in 2004, Eastwood moved to Dave Koz's label, Rendezvous, which released his albums Paris Blue (2005), and Now (2006).

In addition to his solo albums, Eastwood has also contributed music to nine of his father's films: The Rookie (1990), Mystic River (2002), Million Dollar Baby (2004), Flags of Our Fathers (2006), Letters from Iwo Jima (2006), Changeling (2008), Gran Torino (2008), Invictus (2009), and J. Edgar (2011). He was nominated with music partner Michael Stevens for a 2006 Chicago Film Critics Association Award for Original Score (Letters from Iwo Jima).

In 2014, Eastwood and Matt McGuire contributed to the score of the documentary Homme Less about homeless photographer Mark Reay.

=== Other work ===
Kyle Eastwood provided the voice of "Daddy" in "Daddy and Son" (2007) and the voice of 1980s-era DJ Andy Wright for the computer game The Movies (2005).

He had a supporting role in the 1982 Clint Eastwood film Honkytonk Man.

== Personal life ==
In 1995, Eastwood married Laura Gomez, with whom he had a daughter. They later divorced.

Eastwood married Cynthia Ramirez in September 2014 at his father's Mission Ranch Hotel in Carmel, California.

== Discography ==
=== Studio albums ===
Year	Album	Label
1998	From There to Here	Sony
2004	Paris Blue	Rendezvous / Candid
2006	Now	Rendezvous / Candid
2009	Metropolitain	Rendezvous / Candid
2011	Songs from the Chateau	Rendezvous / Candid
2013	The View from Here	Jazz Village
2015	Time Pieces	Jazz Village
2017	In Transit	Jazz Village
2019	Cinematic	Jazz Village
2023	Eastwood Symphonic	Discograph

=== Compilation albums ===
2016	Candid Kyle	Candid

=== Soundtracks ===
Year	Album	Label
2006	Letters from Iwo Jima	Milan / Warner
2007	Rails & Ties	New Line / Sony
2009	Invictus	Candid

=== Charted albums ===
Year	Album	Peak chart positions			Label
Year	Album	US Jazz	US Class Cross	US Trad Jazz	Label
1998	From There to Here	—	—	21	Sony
2005	Paris Blue	—	—	20	Rendezvous / Candid
2007	Now	—	—	—	Rendezvous / Candid
2013	The View from Here	46	—	24	Jazz Village
2023	Eastwood: Symphonic	—	7	—	Discograph
"—" denotes a recording that did not chart.

=== Charted singles ===
Year	Title	Peak chart positions	Album
Year	Title	Smooth Jazz Airplay	Album
2007	"Now"	25	Now
"—" denotes a recording that did not chart.

== Filmography ==
=== Composer/performer/arranger ===
- 1990 The Rookie as composer, "Red Zone" with Michael Stevens
- 1991 Regarding Henry as uncredited performer
- 2003 Mystic River as composer, "Cosmo", "Black Emerald Blues" with Michael Stevens
- 2004 Million Dollar Baby as composer, "Boxing Baby", "Solferino", "Blue Diner" with Michael Stevens
- 2006 Letters from Iwo Jima as composer, with Michael Stevens
- 2006 Flags of Our Fathers as arranger
- 2007 Rails & Ties as music by
- 2008 Changeling as arrangements
- 2008 Gran Torino as composer, with Michael Stevens
- 2009 Invictus as composer, with Michael Stevens
- 2011 J. Edgar as composer, "Red Sails in the Sunset", "I Only Have Eyes for You"

=== Actor ===
- 1976 The Outlaw Josey Wales as Josey's Son (uncredited)
- 1980 Bronco Billy as Orphan (uncredited)
- 1982 Honkytonk Man as Whit Stovall
- 1990 The Rookie as Band Member at Ackerman's House Party (uncredited)
- 1995 The Bridges of Madison County as James Rivers Band
- 2007 Summer Hours as James
- 2011 J. Edgar as Member of The "Stork Club Band"
