= Rails & Ties =

- Theatrical release poster
- Directed by: Alison Eastwood
- Written by: Micky Levy
- Produced by: Robert Lorenz; Peer Oppenheimer; Barrett Stuart
- Starring: Kevin Bacon; Marcia Gay Harden
- Cinematography: Tom Stern
- Edited by: Gary D. Roach
- Music by: Kyle Eastwood; Michael Stevens
- Production company: Malpaso Productions
- Distributed by: Warner Bros. Pictures
- Release date: October 26, 2007
- Running time: 101 minutes
- Country: United States
- Language: English
- Budget: $7.5 million
- Box office: $22,136

Rails & Ties is a 2007 American drama film directed by Alison Eastwood in her directional debut and written by Micky Levy and starring Kevin Bacon and Marcia Gay Harden.

== Plot ==
Laura Danner is a mentally ill, single mother who takes illegal drugs and is unable to care for her 10-year-old son Davey. Driven to despair, she decides to die by suicide by driving a car on to a railway track, taking Davey with her. She offers him some tranquillisers beforehand but, unbeknownst to her, he spits them out. His mother drives on to the tracks. As a train approaches, Davey tries in vain to drag her out of the car, himself jumping clear just in time. Two train crewmen, Tom Stark and Otis Higgs, seeing the car on the tracks ahead, argue about whether an emergency stop will derail the train or not. However, the train hits and kills the boy's mother. Subsequently, the railroad company calls for an internal inquiry and suspends the two drivers pending an informal inquiry.

Davey has spent the first night after the incident with an empathetic social worker, Renee. However, she places the boy with a cold-hearted, disciplinarian foster mother who immediately declares to the boy that she would have preferred a girl. Later on, after being confined to his room for insulting the foster mother while she berated him in the kitchen, he escapes by shattering first a picture frame on the wall, and then used the shattered glass to cut out the screen in the open window. The authorities are alerted and a missing persons search is initiated. The boy obtains train conductor Tom Stark's home address. He turns up at the Starks' home and berates Tom for accidentally killing his mother in the train crash, but eventually he is placated. Tom's wife Megan insists on letting the boy stay although Tom initially disapproves. Caring for Davey gradually helps the couple rebond with each other.

Megan is suffering from breast cancer which has returned and spread to her bones. Having already undergone a mastectomy, she has decided that she will no longer endure chemotherapy and must accept her inevitable death. The couple have no children, due to Megan's illness and Tom's job. Tom is unable to deal with his wife's illness and implores her to continue treatment. Meanwhile, the social worker, Renee, hearing that the boy may have sought out the Stark's home, arrives at the house and even searches it, suspecting the boy is there, but finds only a visibly sick Megan Stark. The family continues to bond, but the social worker keeps an eye on the family. When she sees them out in the park for a picnic, she decides to call the police, but stops when she realizes that the boy is clearly part of a devoted family.

Megan's condition deteriorates and Davey discovers that she is indeed dying. He has a fit, blaming himself not only for Megan's death but also for the suicide of his own mother. Tom Stark placates the boy, reassuring him that it is not his fault. A few hours prior to her death, Megan tells a saddened Davey how much she loves him. She dies in her sleep. Some time after the funeral, Tom informs Davey that it is perhaps now time to contact the social worker to see if he can adopt him. The film ends with Tom and Davey approaching Renee's office hand-in-hand.

== Cast ==
- Kevin Bacon as Tom Stark
- Marcia Gay Harden as Megan Stark
- Miles Heizer as Davey Danner
- Marin Hinkle as Renee
- Eugene Byrd as Otis Higgs
- Bonnie Root as Laura Danner
- Steve Eastin as N.B. Garcia
- Laura Cerón as Susan Garcia
- Margo Martindale as Judy Neasy
- Kathryn Joosten as Mrs. Brown

== Reception ==
On the review aggregator website Rotten Tomatoes, 34% of 47 critics' reviews are positive, with an average rating of 4.6/10. The website's consensus reads: "Despite the strong cast, Rails & Ties is an emotionally overwrought, not entirely believable melodrama." Metacritic, which uses a weighted average, assigned the film a score of 44 out of 100, based on 15 critics, indicating "mixed or average" reviews.
