= Rendezvous Records =

American pop record label, 1958–1963

- Founded: 1958
- Founder: Leon René
- Defunct: 1963
- Status: Defunct
- Genre: Pop/Rock
- Country of origin: United States
- Location: Los Angeles, California

Rendezvous Records was an American record label, established in 1958 in Los Angeles, California. Its biggest successes were "In the Mood" (#4 US) with Ernie Fields along with "Bumble Boogie" (#21) and "Nut Rocker" (#23) recorded by members of its house band going under the name B. Bumble and the Stingers.

The company was founded by songwriter Leon René, who had previously set up the pioneering independent rhythm and blues labels Exclusive and Excelsior labels in the 1940s, and then Class Records in 1951. He set up Rendezvous with partners Rod Pierce and Gordon Wolf, to issue pop music. The company's house band was led by Ernie Fields, and included pianist Ernie Freeman, guitarist René Hall, saxophonist Plas Johnson, bassist Red Callender and drummer Earl Palmer.

Rendezvous went out of business in 1963.
