= Michael Stevens (composer) =

American musician and composer (born 1967)

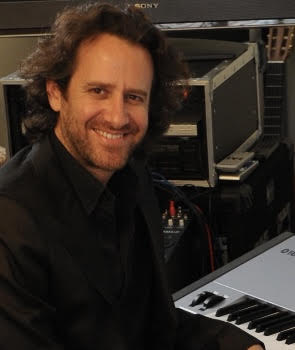
- Stevens in 2024

Background information
- Born: 7 October 1967 (age 59)
- Genres: Film score; jazz
- Occupations: Composer; musician

Michael Stevens is an American musician and composer. He has collaborated with Kyle Eastwood on numerous projects, including the film scores to Clint Eastwood's films, Mystic River (2003), Million Dollar Baby (2004), Letters from Iwo Jima (2006), Gran Torino (2008), and Invictus (2009). He was nominated with Kyle Eastwood for a 2006 Chicago Film Critics Association Award for Original Score for Letters from Iwo Jima. In 2008, he was nominated for a Golden Globe Award for Best Original Song for the song "Gran Torino".

== Selected works ==
Stevens has worked extensively as a composer and in the music department for various films, television, and video productions. Some of his notable contributions include:

=== As composer ===
- Letters from Iwo Jima (2006)
- Gran Torino (2008)
- Invictus (2009)
- Rails & Ties (2007)
- Pieds nus sur les limaces (2010)
- 2036 Origin Unknown (2018)
- Back to Berlin (2018)
- Cacciaguida (2019, Short)
- The Human Factor (2013)
- Médecin-chef à la Santé (2012, TV Movie)
- In Turmoil (2011)
- An Unlikely Weapon (2008)
- Eastwood Symphonic - Une affaire de Famille (2023, TV Special)

=== Music department ===
- Changeling (2008) – Music Arranger
- Grace Is Gone (2007) – Music arranger, Musician (guitar)
- Million Dollar Baby (2004) – Additional Music Composer
- Mystic River (2003) – Additional Music Composer
- Flags of Our Fathers (2006) – Special Musical Arrangements
- The Rock (1996) – Musician: guitar (uncredited)
- Two If by Sea (1996) – Music recordist
- The House of the Spirits (1993) – Assistant to Hans Zimmer
- Toys (1992) – Musician

=== Soundtrack contributions ===
- Gran Torino (2008) – Writer of "Gran Torino"
- Pieds nus sur les limaces (2010) – Writer and performer of "Where we go" and "Vagabond"
- Invictus (2009) – Writer of "Invictus 9,000 Days"
- Grace Is Gone (2007) – Producer of "Grace Is Gone"
- Flags of Our Fathers (2006) – Performer and writer of "Knock Knock", performer of "Flags of Our Fathers"
- Million Dollar Baby (2004) – Writer of "Boxing Baby," "Solferino," and "Blue Diner"
- Mystic River (2003) – Writer of "Cosmo" and "Black Emerald Blues"
- The Rookie (1990) – Writer of "Red Zone"
