= Personal life of Clint Eastwood =

Clint Eastwood has had numerous casual and serious relationships of varying length and intensity over his life, many of which overlapped. He has eight known children by six women, only half of whom were contemporaneously acknowledged. Eastwood refuses to confirm his exact number of offspring, and there have been wide discrepancies in the media regarding the number. His biographer, Patrick McGilligan, has stated on camera that Eastwood's total number of children is indeterminate and that "one was when he was still in high school."

Eastwood's first marriage was to manufacturing secretary-turned-fitness instructor Margaret Neville Johnson in December 1953, having met her on a blind date the previous May. During the courtship, he had an affair that resulted in his daughter Laurie (born 1954), who was adopted by Clyde and Helen Warren of Seattle. While the identity of Laurie's biological mother is not public record, McGilligan said the mother belonged to a theatre group Eastwood participated in. Eastwood continued having affairs while married to Johnson, including a 1959 to 1973 liaison with stuntwoman Roxanne Tunis that produced a daughter, Kimber (born 1964). Tunis and Eastwood would keep up a "healthy relationship" until her death in 2023.

Johnson tolerated the open marriage with Eastwood, and eventually they had two children, Kyle (born 1968) and Alison (born 1972). In 1975, Eastwood and married actress-director Sondra Locke began living together; she had been in a marriage of convenience since 1967 with Gordon Leigh Anderson, a gay sculptor. Locke claimed that Eastwood sang "She made me monogamous" to her and confided he had "never been in love before." Nine years into their cohabitation, Eastwood officially divorced Johnson; Locke, however, would remain married to Anderson until her death in 2018. According to Bill Brown, publisher of the Carmel Pine Cone, Eastwood considered Locke the love of his life, yet he has never addressed her death.

In an unpublicized affair, Eastwood sired two legally fatherless children, Scott (born 1986) and Kathryn (born 1988) with Jacelyn Reeves, a flight attendant. When Locke and Eastwood separated in 1989, Locke filed a palimony lawsuit and later sued for fraud, reaching a settlement in both cases.

During the early-to-mid-1990s, Eastwood had a relationship with actress Frances Fisher that yielded a daughter, Francesca (born 1993). Eastwood was married for the second time in 1996 to news anchor Dina Ruiz, who gave birth to their daughter Morgan that same year. Ruiz and Eastwood's marriage lasted until 2014. He has been seen with other women since then.

Eastwood's spokespeople, managers, and press agents have long denied any knowledge of his life. Eastwood dated restaurant hostess Christina Sandera from 2014 until Sandera's death due to arrhythmia on July 18, 2024, though he did not utter a word in public about their alliance prior to announcing that she had died. By the fall of 2024, Eastwood was in a new relationship, though his partner has not been identified.

== Early sexual relationships ==
During an interview for his sole authorized biography, Eastwood told film historian Richard Schickel that he lost his virginity to a neighbor when he was 14 years old. At age 19, Eastwood dated a schoolteacher in her 20s who stalked him and threatened to commit suicide after he broke up with her. Reflecting upon this relationship, Eastwood told Us Weekly in 1987: "There was just a little misinterpretation about how serious the whole thing was."

Eastwood acknowledged to Schickel that his conquests during these years were "numerous," though none are named in the book, and despite his ever-expanding notoriety as a Lothario, none of the actor's subsequent biographers have managed to produce the names of any pre-showbusiness girlfriends.

== Marriage to Margaret Johnson ==
=== First extramarital affairs and daughter placed for adoption ===
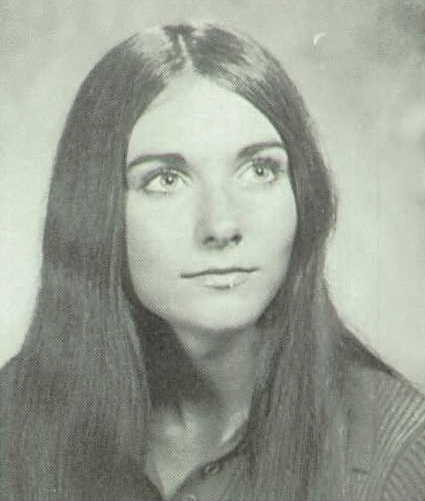
Eastwood's daughter Laurie, whose mother has never been identified

In early spring 1953, Eastwood met Margaret Neville 'Maggie' Johnson, a secretary for auto parts suppliers Industria Americana, on a blind date in the San Francisco area. (Note: Johnson was often described as a "model," but no evidence of her alleged modeling career has come to light, and a 1959 press release explicitly refers to her as a nonprofessional. As of 1990 she taught aerobics classes. Various reference books also haphazardly assert her occupation as "swimsuit designer.") Johnson was scheduled to graduate from U.C. Berkeley that June. In the meantime, Eastwood left for Seattle, where "to please a girl he dug, he joined a Little Theatre group." The unnamed young woman became pregnant by Eastwood and placed their child, a girl, for adoption. Daughter Laurie Murray (also known as Laurie Alison Warren; born February 11, 1954) was adopted by Clyde Elwin Warren and the former Helen I. Smith. Her existence went entirely unremarked in the press until 2018, when she was publicly acknowledged as Eastwood's child for the first time at age 64. (Note: Laurie had been photographed with Eastwood many years before she identified herself to the media, accompanying him to the 76th Academy Awards in 2004. Nonetheless, she remains an open secret in absence of official confirmation from her father himself. For instance, CNN's online profile of Eastwood—updated through 2026—continues to exclude Laurie from its list of the actor's offspring, as does Biography.com's sketch last modified in 2021. Although PBS described Laurie's presence at the premiere of The Mule as "a very public gesture," it did not get mainstream coverage, with People magazine repudiating her existence afterward.) According to her son Lowell Thomas Murray IV, Laurie's biological mother—whose identity is not publicly known—"never told Eastwood she was pregnant or spoke to him again." On the contrary, biographer Patrick McGilligan said that Eastwood had discussed the woman's pregnancy with family and friends, then "handed money over to the woman and left for L.A."

Meanwhile, Johnson announced her engagement to Eastwood in October 1953. They married on December 19 at Oneonta Congregational Church in South Pasadena, California, less than eight weeks before his unidentified Seattle girlfriend gave birth to Laurie. There is still no explanation for why Eastwood decided to marry Johnson when another woman was carrying his child at the time. Biographer Shawn Levy argues that Eastwood "sincerely believed" the woman had gotten an abortion, while McGilligan contends that Eastwood sometimes talked about the possibility he was the father of someone living in Seattle. Laurie would go on to work as an elementary grade school teacher in Washington's South Kitsap School District, and has steadfastly refused to speak about her mother, who reportedly did not want to be contacted when Laurie reached out to her. Eastwood, for his part, has long spurned requests for clarification and will not converse with the media regarding Laurie.

Eastwood's inexplicable marriage to Johnson had further problems. "He thought they were too young, not well enough established," Schickel wrote, noting that Johnson, the primary breadwinner, "expected to marry after a courtship had proceeded for a certain length of time." Actress Mamie Van Doren later reported she had an affair with Eastwood over the summer of 1955 while working on Star in the Dust, a low-budget B-movie in which she starred and he played an uncredited bit role. In the fall of that year, Eastwood purportedly had a tryst with a pre-fame Jayne Mansfield. He refers to this period of his life as "married bachelorhood."

=== Relationship with Roxanne Tunis ===
Roxanne Tunis
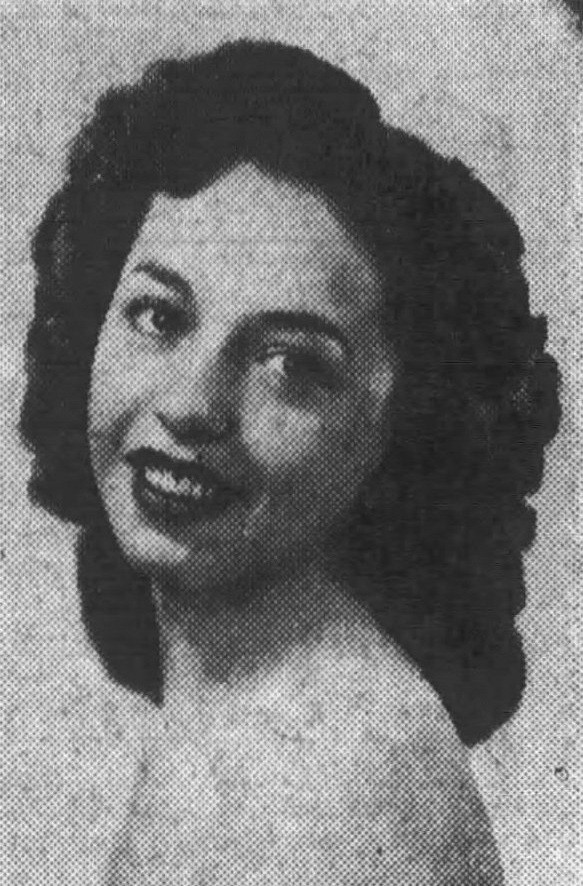
- Roxanne Tunis in 1949
- Born: Rose Ann Tunis; April 13, 1930; Scranton, Pennsylvania, U.S.
- Died: June 23, 2023 (aged 93); Camarillo, California, U.S.
- Education: Manhattan Theatre Colony
- Occupations: Dancer; stuntwoman; nutritionist; meditation instructor
- Title: Miss Sky Queen 1948
- Spouse: Jack Watson Scheck Jr. (m. 1956; div. 1984)
- Parents: Pietro Trunzo; Theresa Costa
- Relatives: 3 brothers, 6 sisters 1 daughter and grandson 2 great-grandchildren

In 1959 during the second season of Rawhide, Eastwood began a long-lasting affair (reportedly 14 years) with dancer and stuntwoman Roxanne Tunis. She was also married yet separated. (Note: Tunis had married Jack Watson Scheck Jr. in 1956. She divorced him in December 1984, a month after Eastwood's own divorce and 10 months after the birth of Tunis and Eastwood's grandson, Clinton Gaddie (now Clint McCartney). Their daughter Kimber attended at least one school under the surname Scheck.) Their relationship resulted in Eastwood's earliest legal child, daughter Kimber Eastwood (born Kimber Tunis; June 17, 1964). Kimber's existence was kept secret from the public until July 1989, when the National Enquirer broke the story. Her birth certificate does list Eastwood as the father, however. (Note: The cover-up notwithstanding, Kimber's existence seems to have been acknowledged within Eastwood's immediate family, as evidenced by his father's 1970 Oakland Tribune obituary cryptically listing "four grandchildren"—a count that exceeds the sum of sister Jeanne's two daughters and Eastwood's sole child of record at that time.)

Biographer Marc Eliot wrote that Eastwood's wife Johnson may not have known about the baby at the time: "It is difficult to say for sure that she actually knew about the baby, although it would have been nearly impossible for her not to. Everyone on the set knew ... and it is simply too difficult to keep a secret like that when the mother and the illegitimate child live in the same small town, especially when that small town is Hollywood." Tunis' friend Francesca Gregoli claimed Johnson was aware of Kimber's existence at all times and even met Roxanne in person when making an unannounced visit to the set of Breezy in 1972. Actress Barbara Eden, a onetime Rawhide guest star and witness to the affair with Tunis, said Eastwood and Johnson "conducted a somewhat open marriage." Eastwood himself considered it something to return to for a rest. In an authorized 1971 profile in Screen Stars, columnist Tim Chadwick wrote that Eastwood and Johnson "kept their distance from each other most of the time" and had "stayed together by staying apart!"

In 1992, Johnson granted a rare interview with biographer Douglas Thompson, talking in generalities about her ex-husband and his career, but refused comment when asked about Tunis. Neither Tunis nor any of her nine siblings have ever spoken to the media. (Note: Celebrity-adjacent in her own right, Tunis' sister Harriet has a son fathered by Stephen Stills of Crosby, Stills, Nash & Young fame, also out of wedlock, thus making Stills' son a maternal first cousin of Eastwood's daughter.) However, sources close to the Tunis family agreed to be interviewed anonymously for McGilligan's book in the late 1990s. According to them, Eastwood "wanted to have a baby with his mistress. [He] would often stroke Tunis' tummy and ask, 'How's my little Rowdy coming?' When she became pregnant, Clint was ecstatic." This directly contradicts the earlier Schickel biography of 1996, which spun the tale that Eastwood didn't even realize Tunis was pregnant until after Kimber had been born.

Tunis bought property in Deschutes River Woods, Oregon following the dissolution of their affair. Eastwood was pleased that she chose to leave Los Angeles, where news of their love child might get out. Over the years he occasionally gave Tunis work as an unbilled extra in his films; her casting in Hang 'Em High actually appeared in print.

For her part, Kimber has answered media inquiries with candor. In 1989, amid revelations of her existence, she told the Sunday Mirror: "Yes, Clint Eastwood is my father. I must speak to him about this. I am partly shocked and partly glad it is all out in the open." Following this confirmation, Kimber shared in an interview with Star that "Mom called him because she's expecting a check. He began screaming and yelling into the phone. He's so upset because he's guilty." In 1990, she told the Manchester Evening News: "I'm cut off completely. He's furious with me. He's disowned me and his grandson." Later that year, Eastwood refused to attend his daughter's wedding to Denver businessman Doug McCartney, so she was given away by an uncle instead. Throughout the tabloid hubbub Eastwood maintained complete silence; as a result, major publications like People magazine still denied Kimber's existence as late as 1993. (Note: Moreover, when Tunis' maternal nephew (and Kimber's first cousin), Craig Gronenthal, was murdered in 1998, the Los Angeles Times repeatedly omitted any reference whatever to Eastwood or Stills.)

Roxanne Tunis died after a brief illness on June 23, 2023, at the age of 93. Eastwood was devastated by the loss, their daughter reported. Tunis has been described posthumously as "one of Clint's true loves." A family intimate told Radar Online: "Roxanne worshipped the ground he walked on. She didn't give a damn about the fact that Clint was a star. She was never impressed with all the money and fame. All she ever wanted was to have and to hold Clint Eastwood the man." At any rate, Eastwood has never talked about Tunis at all.

=== Other affairs and reconciliation ===
Ria Brown, the biographer of competitive swimmer Anita Lhoest, claims Lhoest terminated a pregnancy by Eastwood without consulting him at one point during their late 1950s to early 1960s affair. Restaurant critic Gael Greene described an affair with Eastwood that started when she was assigned to interview him on the set of 1970's Two Mules for Sister Sara. A fling with French model Cathy Reghin around the same time was one of his few extramarital involvements to receive press coverage of any kind during the fact. Another French model, Danielle Cotet, claimed a two-year relationship with Eastwood and got a walk-on role in Paint Your Wagon, unbeknownst to the film's lead actress Jean Seberg, with whom Eastwood began an on-set dalliance that lasted about five months and ended with him ghosting her. During his tenure on Rawhide, Eastwood dated professional boxer LaVonne 'Snow White' Ludian, remaining friends with her long afterward. (Note: Ludian is believed to have been the inspiration for Eastwood's Oscar-winning blockbuster Million Dollar Baby. In 2023, over half a century after their affair ended, Ludian felt let down when Eastwood ignored interview requests for Right to Fight, a documentary about the pioneers of women's boxing, in which she was profiled. Subsequently, the International Women's Boxing Hall of Fame called Eastwood out for not acknowledging Ludian.) According to McGilligan, Eliot and Levy, Eastwood had many other affairs, including with Hang 'Em High co-stars Inger Stevens and Arlene Golonka, The Beguiled co-star Jo Ann Harris, actresses Jill Banner, Catherine Deneuve, Susan Saint James and Reiko Oshida, columnist Bridget Byrne, socialite Joan Lundberg Hitchcock and jazz singer Keely Smith while married to Johnson, who, after a trial separation and a lingering bout of hepatitis during the mid-1960s, expressed desire to reconcile and start a family. They had two children together: Kyle Eastwood (born May 19, 1968) and Alison Eastwood (born May 22, 1972).

With few exceptions, Eastwood avoided becoming entangled with women who might attract publicity, instead preferring low-profile paramours. Restaurant manager Paul E. Lippman, who co-founded the Hog's Breath Inn with Eastwood in 1972, said:

I had to terminate three pretty good waitresses in the first few months of operation; not because they went to bed with Clint Eastwood, but because they either talked about it all over the premises, or came in the next day acting like they owned the place. A fourth waitress continued sleeping with him on a regular basis, but I didn’t have to fire her because she didn’t talk about it; she wanted to be an actress. And she got a speaking part in The Eiger Sanction while still a waitress!

Eastwood was the subject of a blind item linking him romantically with pro-communist activist Angela Davis, although both parties have chosen not to address this. Thunderbolt and Lightfoot bit player June Fairchild wrote of an amorous encounter with Eastwood in her memoir, Catch a Fallen Star. When Fairchild became homeless in 2007, Eastwood wanted to get in touch with her to give her a helping hand.

== Relationship with Sondra Locke ==
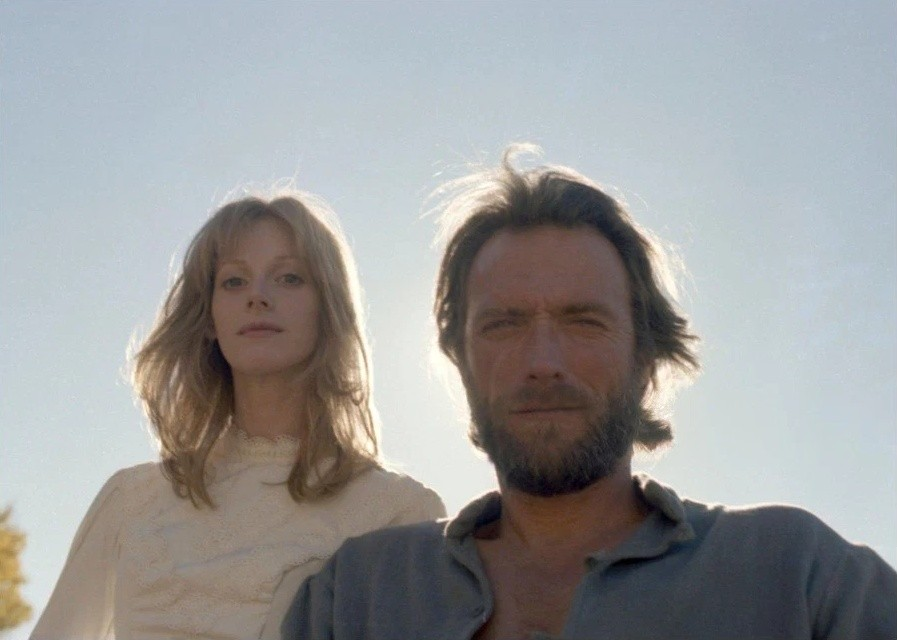
Locke and Eastwood in 1975, during filming of The Outlaw Josey Wales

In 1972, Eastwood met married actress (later director) Sondra Locke at a meeting set up by mutual friend Jo Heims on the Universal Studios Lot. (Note: It is commonly misreported that Locke "auditioned" for Breezy. In actual fact, she was rejected on the spot for being too old.) Locke's lifestyle was congruent to his, as she had married for societal purposes while conducting a succession of affairs that were withheld from public view. Like Eastwood, she maintained the fiction of being happily married when she needed to conceal other alliances. (Note: Not all of Locke's extramarital affairs had been kept secret. She and Bo Hopkins, her co-star in the TV movie Gondola, were a public couple, appearing together in five episodes of the game show Tattletales that aired right before she left him for Eastwood—all while remaining married to Anderson.) The two began living together during the production of The Outlaw Josey Wales in Page, Arizona in October 1975, by which time, according to Locke, "He had told me that there was no real relationship left between him and Maggie." Locke wrote in her autobiography, "Clint seemed astonished at his need for me, even admitting that he'd never been faithful to one woman — because he'd 'never been in love before,' he confided. He even made up a song about it: 'She made me monogamous'. That flattered and delighted me. I would never doubt his faithfulness and his love for me."

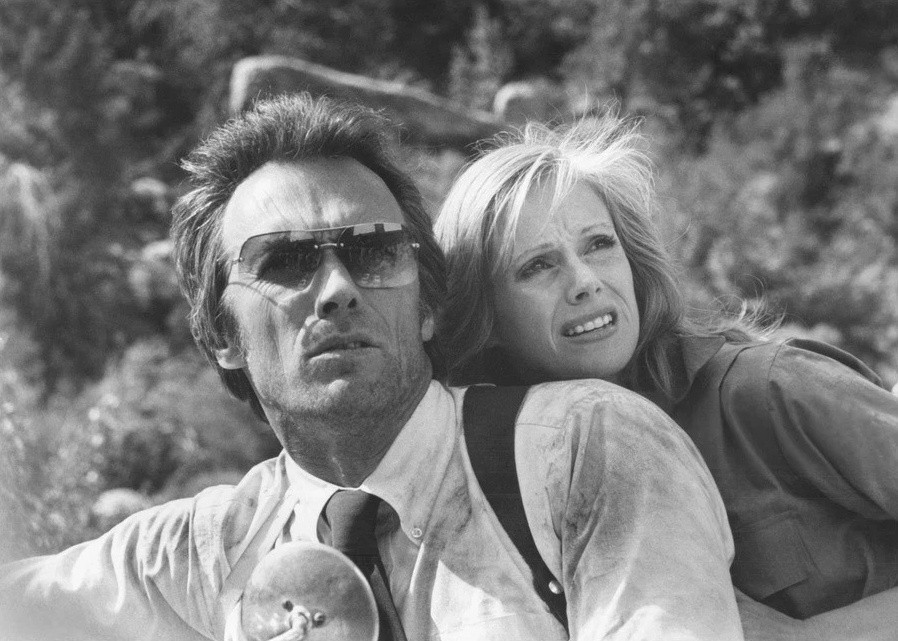
With Locke in The Gauntlet (1977)

After Josey wrapped, Locke moved into the Sherman Oaks house Eastwood had once shared with Johnson (who by then lived full-time in Pebble Beach), but felt uncomfortable there because "psychologically it would always be Maggie's," and insisted they relocate. The couple moved to Bel-Air in a fixer-upper that took three years to remodel. In the interim they shuttled between homes in Tiburon, California and Sun Valley, Idaho, as well as the Rising River Ranch which Eastwood bought from Bing Crosby's estate. Locke underwent two abortions and a tubal ligation during the late 1970s. She was quite reluctant to get the second abortion—at 35, she was almost a decade above the median age of American married women receiving this procedure—and mused how she "couldn't help but think that that baby, with both Clint's and my best qualities, would be extraordinary." (Note: In a 1969 Dick Kleiner interview, Locke said: "I'd feel sorry for any child that had me for a mother." This is consistent with Eastwood's account that Locke repeatedly confided she never wanted to have children.) Johnson made no secret of her dislike for Locke, even though the two women never met. "Maggie placed severe rules on my relationship with the kids [...] After she learned that Clint had taken me onto her property to show me a baby deer that had just been born there, she laid down a rule that I was never to be allowed there again. I was not even allowed to phone the Pebble Beach house."

=== Divorce from Johnson ===
In 1978, Johnson retained an attorney to file for legal separation from Eastwood. Early that year she had finally accepted the fact that Locke "was not like any of his affairs of their past." The legal separation came into effect by a notarized agreement in January 1979. Divorce papers, however, would not be filed until May 18, 1984. The divorce was finalized on November 19, with Johnson receiving a straight cash payment said to be between $20 and $25 million. She died on October 4, 2026, aged 94.

For her part, Locke never divorced Gordon Anderson, her lawful husband since 1967. (Note: Folklore describing Anderson as Locke's "childhood friend" has long been parroted by the press, though they grew up in different states and did not even meet until high school.) Anderson, a sculptor and former stage actor, was gay and resided with his boyfriend John McKee in a West Hollywood home purchased by Eastwood. The Locke/Anderson union had always been a marriage of convenience only and, according to court testimony, was never consummated. Locke said of the unorthodox arrangement: "I truly believed that Clint and I did not need papers to validate the commitments we had made to each other." Her husband Anderson kept such a low profile that, over time, reporters would either erroneously refer to their still-legal marriage in the past tense or altogether omit any reference to it.

Eastwood and Locke reteamed onscreen for The Gauntlet, Every Which Way but Loose, Bronco Billy, Any Which Way You Can and Sudden Impact. According to former longtime associate Fritz Manes, Eastwood was devoted to her between 1976 and 1980 at the least, but discreetly kept up several "maintenance relationships" (such as with Tunis) during that period. "I marveled at it," Manes said. "It was absolute total, blind love." According to Schickel, the relationship began to disintegrate when Locke chose to remain married to Anderson for tax purposes after Eastwood had divorced Johnson. Locke said she would have been willing to divorce Anderson if Eastwood agreed to go to couples therapy with her, but he refused, despite bemoaning, "She's married to someone who doesn't work. So what does that do? That makes me the sole provider." Locke later counterclaimed that although Eastwood did pay for her husband's house, he "never spent one single penny on any support for Gordon. It was I who had always taken care of Gordon from my own earnings."

=== Affairs with Jacelyn Reeves and others ===
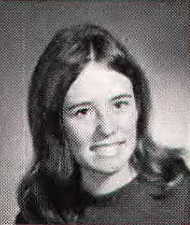
Jacelyn Reeves bore two of Eastwood's children with no publicity whatsoever.

McGilligan claims Eastwood returned to his "habitual womanizing" in the early 1980s, becoming involved with story analyst Megan Rose, actresses Jamie Rose and Rebecca Perle (both of whom appeared in Tightrope), James Brolin's animal rights activist ex-wife Jane Agee (who had intermittent liaisons with Eastwood between the early 1960s and late 1980s, encompassing one abortion), and Jacelyn Reeves, a stewardess he reputedly met at his restaurant in Carmel, the Hog's Breath Inn. Amid all this, Eastwood sued the National Enquirer in 1982 over a story claiming he cheated on Locke with country singer Tanya Tucker, who was 15 years younger than Locke.

==== Children with Reeves ====
Eastwood was still cohabiting with Locke when he conceived two children with Reeves: son Scott Eastwood (born Scott Reeves; March 21, 1986) (Note: Reeves married Thomas Wilber Larson approximately one month prior to conceiving her son by Eastwood.) and daughter Kathryn Eastwood (born Kathryn Reeves; February 2, 1988). The birth certificates for both children read "father declined." Eastwood's affair with Reeves was not reported anywhere until an exposé article was published in the Star tabloid in 1990. (Note: The Star exposé came about after paparazzo Vinnie Zuffante photographed Reeves with Eastwood during the 1990 AT&T Pebble Beach Pro-Am. Pictures from that event are misdated as 1987 on Getty Images, and the error has been propagated into secondary citations.) It quoted Reeves as saying, "Some family members tell me to file a paternity suit against Clint, but I don't want to." The children's existence continued to be ignored by mainstream news sources through the mid-2000s. (Note: Because there had been no formal acknowledgment of Kathryn's existence, Shutterstock identified her as "nanny" when she suddenly started showing up at events with her half-siblings.) In 1996, while residing at Eastwood's Hawaiian estate but remaining completely unacknowledged in official narratives, Reeves told the National Enquirer that Eastwood and she had a "good relationship."

Kathryn sparked controversy in 2024 with a series of public outbursts slamming her half-siblings and ex-stepmother Dina, who in turn threatened to sue Kathryn for libel and have her institutionalized. The dispute seemingly ended after a telephone call between Clint and Kathryn, but in 2025, she reignited the feud and consequently was cut out of his life.

=== Breakup with Locke ===
Eastwood's relationship with Locke (at the time unaware of his infidelities, by her own account) ended acrimoniously in April 1989, and the post-breakup litigation dragged on for a decade. Locke filed a palimony lawsuit against him after he changed the locks on their home and moved her possessions into storage when she was at work filming her second directorial feature, Impulse. In court, Eastwood downplayed the intensity of their relationship, arguing that because Locke had been married to somebody else for its entire duration, she was not entitled to a payout. He referred to Locke as his "roommate" before quickly redescribing her as a "part-time roommate." Bill Brown, publisher of the Carmel Pine Cone newspaper and a golfing pal of Eastwood's, said despite the public antipathy, "Clint told me not too long ago that Sondra was the love of his life." Locke's estranged half-brother Donald told The Tennessean that Eastwood still truly loved her, but could no longer take her "addiction" to husband Gordon Anderson.

Anticipating that Eastwood was going to misrepresent the marriage, Locke asked Anderson to surrender all claims on any of her assets that as her legal spouse he was entitled to. "In an extraordinary gesture of love and faith in me, Gordon signed away everything without hesitation." During the proceedings, an investigative journalist contacted Locke and informed her of Eastwood's other family. "I spoke with the nurse in the delivery room, and she confirmed that they are Clint's children. I'll send copies of the birth certificates to you and a photo of Jacelyn, if you want them," Locke quoted the informant. "My mind was still searching to get all his actions lined up. For at least the last four years, Clint had been living this double life, going between me and this other woman, and having children with her. Two babies had been born during the last three years of our relationship, and they weren't mine."

There's never been anything truthful that she's stated ... She's a professional victim. Is it always somebody else's fault for everything?

— Eastwood on Locke in 1997, the last time he spoke about her publicly

In August 1990, Locke was diagnosed with breast cancer and said the treatments sapped her will to fight. By then, the rift between the exes had gotten so deep Eastwood did not reach out to Locke when she disclosed her illness. The following November, Locke dropped her palimony suit in exchange for a settlement package that included a lump sum plus monthly payments from Eastwood and a $1.5 million directing deal at Warner Bros., but sued him again for fraud in 1995 after she became convinced the deal was a sham, finally settling out of court in September 1996. Eastwood was listed as a material witness for Locke's separate pending action against Warner Bros., which alleged that the studio conspired with him to sabotage her directorial career, but in May 1999 that lawsuit too was settled, ending the legal saga. Over the following years, Locke made discrediting comments about Eastwood. She died without fanfare in 2018, aged 74. (Note: Locke was born in 1944, but claimed dates two to 12 years later. The pretense infected almost every published mention of Locke before the growth of fact-checking very late in her life, with the result that it allowed false narratives about "giving up her childbearing years" for Eastwood to flourish. Shawn Levy's book Clint: The Man and the Movies, released seven years after Locke's death, is the first Eastwood biography to discuss Locke with accurate context and not under the false premise of younger age.) At the time of her death, Locke had been legally married to Anderson for 51 years, leaving an estate worth $20 million.

Eastwood has never addressed Locke's death. Five years after she died, David Worth, the cinematographer of Bronco Billy and Any Which Way You Can, reminisced how "in both films, being able to capture the true love between Clint and Sondra was very special." Worth lamented that "since the very bad ending to the Clint/Sondra relationship, those films seem to be not mentioned any longer by him." Punditing about the former couple's mutual disparagements, Levy notes that while Eastwood lied by omission, Locke had outright "fudged the truth about a lot of things that went on." Alison Eastwood, who rarely comments on family matters, said of her late ex-de facto stepmother: "I was actually quite surprised when she wrote that book. I actually lost a lot of respect for her."

== Casual dating ==
Immediately following his split from Locke, Eastwood dated Barbra Streisand. Other companions during 1989 included White Hunter, Black Heart co-star Marisa Berenson, Carmel mayor Jean Grace, actress Dani Crayne and model Barbara Minty, widow of Steve McQueen. The next year, amid brouhaha over their unconventional female-on-male rape scene in The Rookie, Eastwood was rumored to be seeing co-star Sonia Braga, which Braga initially denied, (Note: Donna Mills, with whom Eastwood had a much-ballyhooed sex scene in Play Misty for Me, also dismissed reportage of a real-life liaison.) but later conceded.

Up until this point, Eastwood had gone to considerable effort to keep his personal life secret; now his entanglements were being contemporaneously chronicled in the press, with one headline reading: "Clint Eastwood is playing the field". He pursued a romance with Pink Cadillac co-star Bernadette Peters, but she would not entertain the idea unless he could fully commit himself.

== Daughter with Frances Fisher ==
Eastwood's next major relationship was with actress Frances Fisher, whom he met at a pre-production party for Pink Cadillac in October 1988. The two quietly enjoyed a nonexclusive, intermittent affair for two years before going public with their romance in late 1990. By mid-1991, however, Eastwood was already cheating on her with an employee at the Warner Bros. Movie World theme park. Fisher retrospectively said of dating Eastwood: "I simply felt that this was it, the big one. I had no idea that every woman he meets probably feels as I did." They co-starred in 1992's Unforgiven, and had a daughter, Francesca Eastwood (born Francesca Fisher-Eastwood; August 7, 1993), on the anniversary of that film's release. The birth of Francesca marked the first time Eastwood was present for one of his children being born. Nevertheless, he made Fisher keep her pregnancy a secret until her last trimester, reasoning, "I don't want that kinda thing taking attention away from my Oscar race!" Further defying custom, they did not issue a statement announcing Francesca's birth—the news only came to light two weeks after the fact, when somebody at the Shasta County Clerk's Office alerted the media.

Despite being legally free to wed, the couple did not marry. Around a month before their daughter was born, according to McGilligan, Eastwood was confronted with the claims of a 39-year-old woman from Kent, Washington who had researched her adoption and ascertained that he was her biological father. Eastwood has never responded to the story. An additional strain on the relationship came when Fisher found out—not through him—about yet another hidden brood with Jacelyn Reeves. Eastwood and Fisher ended their relationship in January 1995, after which Fisher said it took two years to complete what she called the grieving process for her shattered dreams. She also divulged that her breakup with Eastwood required mediation. Schickel attributed the split to political differences and Eastwood's disdain for Fisher's New Age beliefs.

In 2018, Francesca gave birth to a son named Titan Wraith. While Eastwood is a grandfather several times over, Titan is his first grandchild whose birth was announced.

== Marriage and divorce with Dina Ruiz ==
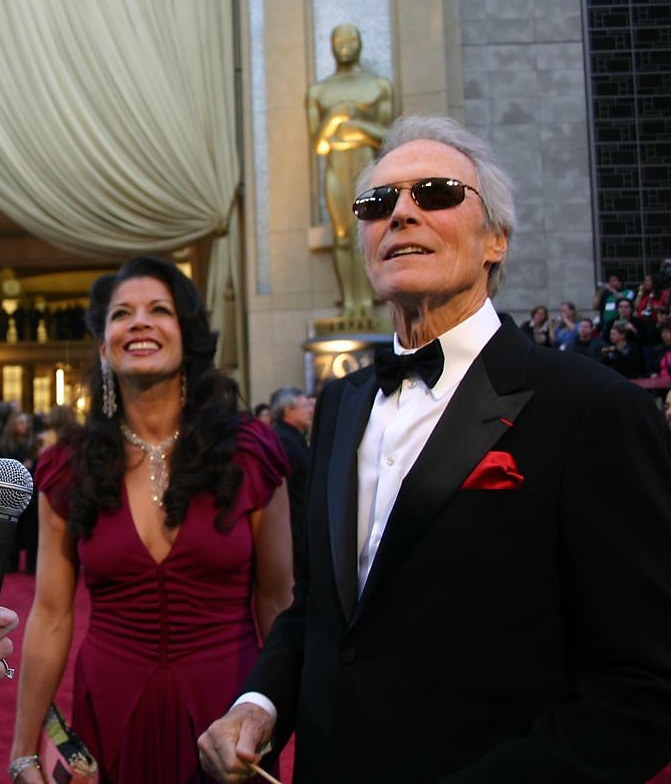
With then-wife Dina in 2007

Before Fisher had moved out of Eastwood's house, he was reportedly already dating Dina Ruiz, a television news anchor 35 years his junior whom he first met when she interviewed him in March 1993. It is not clear when exactly the two started seeing each other romantically. Eastwood took Ruiz to two high-profile golf tournaments in February 1995 without ever announcing that he and Fisher had broken up. In May, Eastwood admitted he was no longer living with Fisher and denied tabloid claims of an affair with Meryl Streep. Ruiz confirmed her engagement to Eastwood on January 19, 1996, three weeks after it had leaked through the tabloids that they had taken out a marriage license. They married on March 31 at the North Las Vegas home of casino magnate Steve Wynn, just outside the Shadow Creek Golf Course. The marriage was noted for the fact that it was only Eastwood's second legal union in spite of his many long-term romances over the decades. Eastwood said of his bride, "I'm proud to make this lady my wife. She's the one I've been waiting for." Ruiz commented, "The fact that I'm only the second woman he has married really touches me." The couple has one daughter, Morgan Eastwood (born December 12, 1996).

In 2001, Eastwood was rumored to be stepping out with jazz singer Diana Krall, which their respective publicists shut down immediately. At that time, an unnamed close friend of Eastwood's told Chicago Sun-Times columnist Bill Zwecker that the actor and his wife had been spending less and less time together and that "I definitely think there has been some trouble ... but then, what marriage doesn't have its ups and downs?"

Ruiz made cameos in two of Eastwood's films: Blood Work and True Crime (in which Fisher even appeared). In the summer of 2012, Dina, Morgan and Francesca starred with the band Overtone in a reality show for the E! network titled Mrs. Eastwood & Company, on which Clint appeared only occasionally. Also featured in the series was Dina's then-sister-in-law Jade Berti, granddaughter of comedy legend Groucho Marx. By sheer coincidence, Marx's handprint square at Grauman's Chinese Theatre touches corners with Mr. Eastwood's; Berti viewed this as a sign of her relationship with Dina's brother, special effects coordinator Dominic Ruiz, being written "in stone and in the stars." (Note: Jade Berti divorced Dominic Ruiz in 2023.) While promoting the show on Chelsea Lately, Dina said jokingly: "I hope we're still married when this is over!"—a reference to the apparent trend that many marriages on reality TV end in divorce. The last episode aired on July 22, one month before Eastwood made a now-infamous speech at the 2012 Republican National Convention, which ex-partner Fisher openly criticized as a publicity stunt to promote his forthcoming movie Trouble with the Curve. Mrs. Eastwood & Company did not return for a second season, and the following spring Dina checked herself into rehab for depression and anxiety.

In August 2013, Dina Eastwood announced that she and her husband had been living separately for an undisclosed length of time. An insider subsequently told Us Weekly that they actually split while her reality show was airing, and added, "Clint fell out of love with Dina a long time ago." By fall, Eastwood's wife filed for divorce after she withdrew her request for legal separation, citing irreconcilable differences. She asked for full custody of their then-16-year-old daughter, Morgan, as well as spousal support, despite a prenuptial agreement waiving her right to the latter. Amid reports that Eastwood was trying to block her alimony request, Dina gave a televised interview on Bethenny, stating, "He's lovely, he hasn't done much. It's other people around him have done things that have blown me away." The divorce was finalized on December 22, 2014. Eastwood, in typical fashion, had no comment at all, and no terms of financial settlement were revealed in the divorce decree.

== Later relationships ==
Since his split from Ruiz, Eastwood has been linked publicly with photographer Erica Tomlinson-Fisher (no relation to Frances), (Note: Erica Tomlinson-Fisher is the ex-wife of college basketball coach Scott Fisher. In a twist that attracted headlines after the Eastwoods separated, Scott Fisher started dating Clint's estranged wife Dina at the same time Clint and Erica were dating. Scott married Dina in 2016, while Clint parted on good terms with Erica, buying her a house after they broke up.) 41 years his junior; producer Noor Alfallah, 64 years his junior; and restaurant hostess Christina Sandera, 33 years his junior. He and Sandera became an item in 2014, though they never officially confirmed their romance. On July 18, 2024, Eastwood issued a statement that Sandera, 61, had died, mourning that "I will miss her very much"; no further detail was provided in that initial statement. Sandera's death certificate, obtained a week later by the New York Post, listed her cause as arrhythmia, with coronary artery disease outlined as an additional condition that led to death.

As of August 2024, Eastwood was "doing OK" according to his son Scott. In early September, his daughter Kimber reported that "the shock value is wearing off," and by the end of that month he already had a new girlfriend, according to investigative journalist Robert Eringer. The identity of Eastwood's latest girlfriend remains unknown.

== Further alleged offspring ==
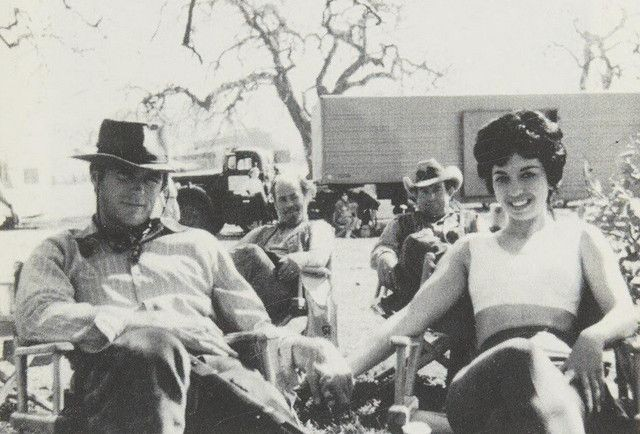
With Roxanne Tunis on the set of Rawhide

Laurie Murray, Kimber Tunis, and Scott and Kathryn Reeves—as well as their respective mothers—are all omitted from the Eastwood episode of A&E's Biography series, which first aired on October 5, 2003. According to McGilligan, "The people who know Clint best suspect there are other families in his closet." The UK edition of Clint: The Life and Legend (1999) was the first publication to report Laurie's existence, although her name was not revealed, and she was not acknowledged by any media outlet until she identified herself to photographers at the December 2018 premiere of The Mule.

Some sources, including a now-defunct website launched in 2006 by his cousin Steve, cite another child named Lesly (born February 13, 1959) by Rosina Mary Glen.

Publicly, Eastwood has been silent on claims of other offspring. (Note: In an unpublicized 2011 court filing, Eastwood did deny fathering Eric James Chisum, a 48-year-old transient who had repeatedly claimed to be his son.) "We don't know how many children Clint has had with how many women," McGilligan stated on-camera in the 2012 French documentary L'album secret de Clint Eastwood. "One was when he was still in high school [...] I heard of other possibilities." Playboy notes that "the number is unconfirmed and Eastwood is reticent about the issue."

When Steve Kroft asked Eastwood how many children he has during a 1997 60 Minutes interview, Eastwood replied, without further elaboration, "I have a few." According to Kroft, "The subject brought the temperature in the room down to about 40 degrees. He just stared at me for about 30 seconds [...] Obviously, it was not a subject he wanted to talk about."

Eastwood has been known to terminate conversations if his children are mentioned. Such was the case with the Boston Herald's Stephen Schaefer, who in 2019 recalled: "He sits, we talk and then I ask about his [number of] kids. Without saying another word, he stands and leaves. Interview abruptly over." Indeed, Eastwood's modus operandi is to communicate only by gesture, inference, and what isn't said or done. "If he doesn't want to answer a question," said Frances Fisher in 2026, "he'll just look at you."

== Bibliography ==
- Levy, Shawn (2025). Clint: The Man and the Movies. HarperCollins. ISBN 9780063251021.
- Henderson, Kirk (2020). Hollywood v. Beauty and the Synchronicity of the Six. Austin Macauley Publishers. ISBN 9781645367000.
- Eliot, Marc (2009). American Rebel: The Life of Clint Eastwood. Harmony Books. ISBN 9780307336897.
- McGilligan, Patrick (2002). Clint: The Life and Legend. St. Martin's Press. ISBN 9780312290320.
- Locke, Sondra (1997). The Good, the Bad, and the Very Ugly: A Hollywood Journey. William Morrow and Company. ISBN 9780688154622.
- Schickel, Richard (1996). Clint Eastwood: A Biography. Alfred A. Knopf. ISBN 9780679429746.
