= Funt =

Funt may refer to:

- Funt (mass), obsolete Russian unit equivalent to a pound
- Allen Funt (1914–1999), American producer-director and creator of Candid Camera
- Peter Funt, son of Allen Funt, current host of Candid Camera
- Sitz-Chairman Funt, fictional character from the novel The Little Golden Calf
