= Money Talks (1972 film) =

- Theatrical release poster
- Directed by: Allen Funt
- Produced by: Allen Funt
- Cinematography: Gil Geller
- Edited by: Jan Welt
- Music by: Mark Barkan
- Production company: Allen Funt Productions
- Distributed by: United Artists
- Release date: August 30, 1972
- Running time: 81 minutes
- Country: United States
- Language: English

Money Talks is a 1972 American documentary film directed by Allen Funt of the Candid Camera television show. The film was released on August 30, 1972, by United Artists.

== Plot ==
Funt employs a hidden camera to record the reaction of people in New York, Kansas City, Boston, Miami and Switzerland who are placed in bizarre situations relating to money.

The scenarios include:

- A public pay-for-use restroom is outfitted with a sign announcing that penalties will be charged for those staying longer than five minutes
- A bowl of dollars with a sign stating "Take One" is placed on a busy city street, with most bystanders obeying the admonition.
- A man at a lunch counter salts his dollar bills and then eats them.
- A woman walks down a street, dropping money, and various people either steal or return the cash.
- A black young man declares that George Washington was black and should be represented as such on the dollar bill.
- A furrier is asked to fit a Great Dane for a mink coat.
- A woman who is hired to answer phones at an expensive apartment building, receives calls requesting rates for mob hitmen.

In other sequences, Funt interviews people directly. Boxer Muhammad Ali offers an unsuspecting delivery man boxing lessons in lieu of payment and comedian Henny Youngman trades one-liner jokes in exchange for goods. When Allen asks his five-year-old daughter Juliet about the importance of money, she responds that "the most important thing in the whole wide world is heart."

== Cast ==
- Muhammad Ali as Boxer
- David McHarris as Tap Dancer
- Marian Mercer as Waitress
- Henny Youngman as Comedian
- Jack London as Money Eater
- Joseph R. Sicari as Dog Owner
- Jackie Bright as Wheeler Dealer
- Ann Myles as Stunt Woman
- Guy King as Rest Room Attendant
- Peter Hock as Stunt Man
- Karen Fund as Money Dropper
- Erin Peeters as Panhandler
- Tony Bell as Boy Tipper

== See also ==
- List of American films of 1972
