= JT Mollner =

American filmmaker

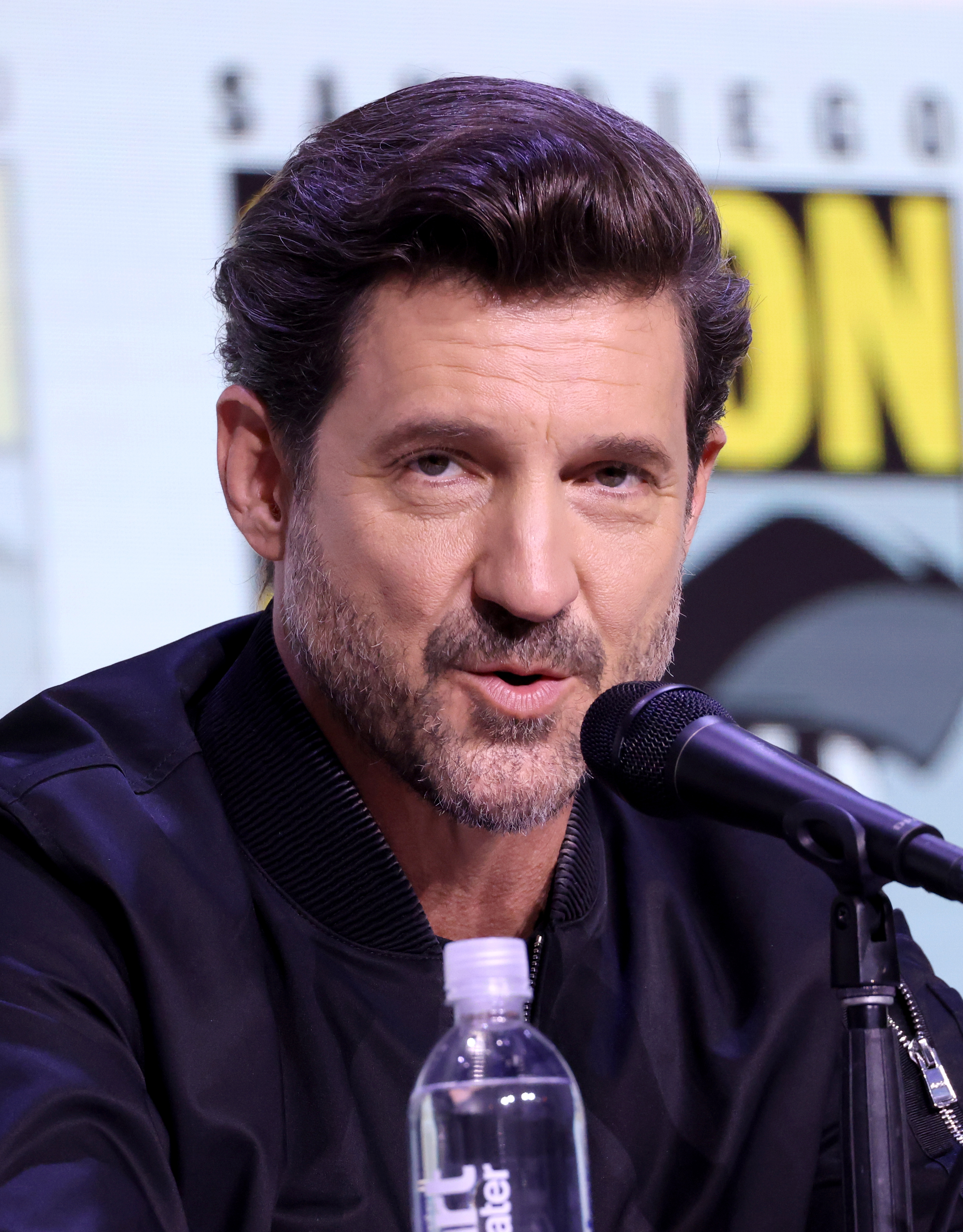
- Mollner in 2025
- Born: Jeffrey Tyler Mollner; Las Vegas, Nevada, U.S.
- Occupations: Film director; screenwriter; producer; actor
- Years active: 2005–present

Jeffrey Tyler Mollner is an American filmmaker and former actor. He is best known for writing and directing the Western film Outlaws and Angels (2016) and the thriller film Strange Darling (2023). He also wrote the screenplay for the Stephen King film adaptation The Long Walk (2025).

== Early life ==
JT Mollner was born in Las Vegas, the son of former singer Ginnie and former dancer Duke Mollner. His parents met while working at the Dunes in the 1960s, where Duke later became a card dealer. Mollner has an older brother named Daniel. He was a cinephile from an early age, and was also interested in adult novels and writing. He credits his aunt Deanna Mollner, who lived in Los Angeles in the 1970s and "ran around with the likes of Jack Nicholson and Roman Polanski", for introducing him to the films of Polanski as well as Stanley Kubrick and Federico Fellini. He has said that he always knew he wanted to be a filmmaker, though he felt it was not an option for him as his older brother had already attended the UCLA Film School.

In 1976, Mollner's father and brother began operating the Freakling Brothers haunted house company from their home in Las Vegas. Mollner had become involved with the company by the age of five, later stating in 2015 that "it was a great household to be from, because you're instantly the most popular kid in school". The company is now best known for its "Gates of Hell" attraction, which became Las Vegas' first R-rated haunted house. To this day, Mollner takes three months off from filmmaking around Halloween each year to return to Las Vegas and help his family run the business.

== Career ==
In 2005, after ending a year-long starring role in a stage production of Tony n' Tina's Wedding at the Rio Hotel in Las Vegas, Mollner moved to Los Angeles to pursue a career in the film industry. Believing his dream to direct films was a long shot, he did not pursue it immediately, instead taking small acting jobs to pay the bills while writing screenplays in his spare time. He soon became frustrated with acting in LA, explaining in an interview that he was tired of "being a tool in someone else's vision... having to read lines from someone else's script [while] wanting to be doing what [the directors] are doing". He began looking for a director for a short film he had written, but his producing partner convinced him to direct it. He directed several commercials and music videos over the next decade, as well as writing and directing a series of short films such as The Red Room (2008) and Henry John and the Little Bug (2009). He directed his father and brother in the short film Sugartown (2011) and directed Dee Wallace in the short film Flowers in December (2015).

In 2007, Mollner planned to make his feature directorial debut with The I Scream Man, about a murderous ice cream man terrorizing a small town. Crispin Glover was cast to play the ice cream man, with Judd Nelson, Michael Madsen, Dee Wallace, Fred Ward, and director George A. Romero in supporting roles. After the film fell through, Mollner began writing a script for another feature in 2010, with the intention of making a film reminiscent of 1970s Westerns. Deciding to wait until he could cast well-known actors, while insisting on using film stock and vintage cameras rather than digital cameras, Outlaws and Angels would be in the development stage for nearly five years. When production finally began in 2015, Mollner was accompanied by cinematographer Matthew Irving, who would become instrumental in providing the classic look Mollner wanted to achieve. The duo contacted Kodak about supplying VISION3 500T Color Negative Film 5219, an uncommon film type due to the grain caused by its slower speed, which served Mollner and Irving well in emulating the 1970s look. The movie was shot entirely on Kodak film using two Panaflex Platinum cameras, a Steadicam, and a variety of vintage lenses. Outlaws and Angels premiered at the 2016 Sundance Film Festival. It was featured as Sundance's midnight selection. It appeared at the Fantasia Film Festival on July 14, 2016, and was released in theaters and VOD on July 15, 2016, receiving generally negative reviews from critics.

Mollner next wrote and directed the thriller film Strange Darling (2023), which was released to positive reviews.

In February 2026, it was reported that Mollner is attached to direct a television series based on The Texas Chain Saw Massacre for A24. Mollner said of the project:

"I’m not interested in remaking perfect films, and the original Texas Chainsaw Massacre is a perfect film. Tobe Hooper and Kim Henkel created something bold, transgressive and truly seminal that holds up even today as the gold standard for horror. When the opportunity for a longform exploration into this world arose, I saw it as a fresh way in, as well as a way to honor the existing folklore."

Also in February 2026, it was reported that Mollner will write and direct a feature film called Skeletons for Sony. The film is described as a "creature feature", which will be "told from the perspective of a young boy who slowly begins to discover that his beloved parents are hiding a disturbing secret about his mother’s true nature." Skeletons will be produced by J.J. Abrams and is set to star Brie Larson. Principal photography is scheduled for summer 2026.

== Filmography ==
Feature films
Year	Title	Director	Writer	Producer
2016	Outlaws and Angels	Yes	Yes	Yes
2023	Strange Darling	Yes	Yes	No
2025	The Long Walk	No	Yes	No
2027	Skeletons	Yes	Yes	No

Short films
Year	Title	Director	Writer	Producer
2008	The Red Room	Yes	Yes	Yes
2009	Henry John and the Little Bug	Yes	Yes	Yes
2011	Sugartown	Yes	Story	Yes
2015	Flowers in December	Yes	Yes	Yes
2019	After Emma	No	No	Yes
