= Keith Loneker =

American actor (1971–2017)

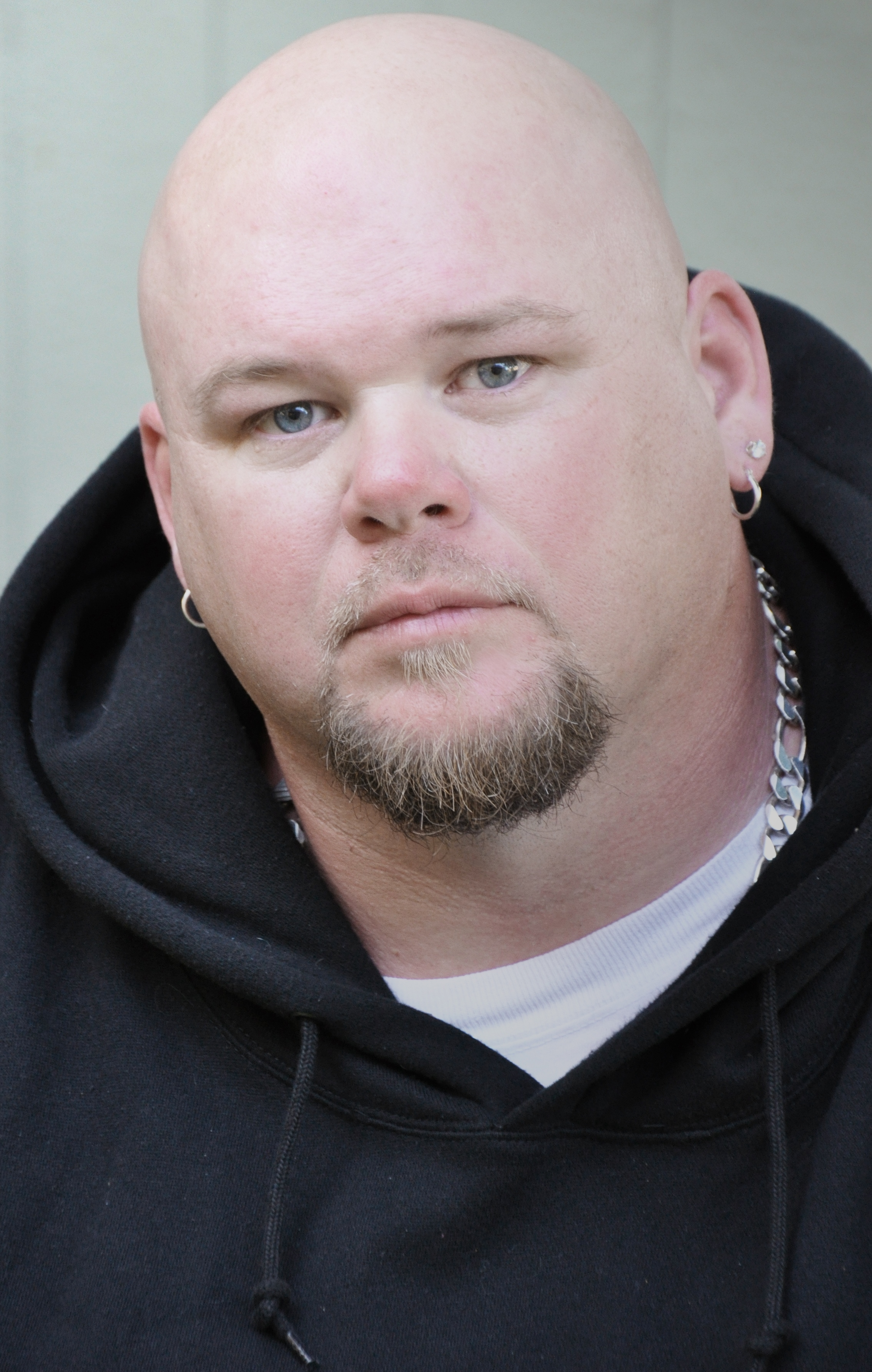
- Loneker in 2012
- Born: June 21, 1971; Roselle Park, New Jersey, U.S.
- Died: June 22, 2017 (aged 46); Lawrence, Kansas, U.S.
- Years active: 1998–2017
- Football career

No. 64
- Position: Guard

Personal information
- Listed height: 6 ft 3 in (1.91 m)
- Listed weight: 325 lb (147 kg)

Career information
- College: Kansas
- NFL draft: 1993: undrafted

Career history
- Los Angeles / St. Louis Rams (1993–1995); Atlanta Falcons (1996)

Awards and highlights
- First-team All-Big Eight (1992); Second-team All-Big Eight (1991)

Career NFL statistics
- Games played: 19
- Games started: 5
- Stats at Pro Football Reference

Keith Joseph Loneker (June 21, 1971 – June 22, 2017) was an American professional football guard and actor. For much of his acting career, his large football-lineman build garnered him roles largely as thugs or football players. His first movie was director Steven Soderbergh's Out of Sight (1998) and later the Neil LaBute thriller, Lakeview Terrace (2008).

== Biography ==
Growing up in Roselle Park, New Jersey, Loneker faced some personal obstacles that he worked hard to overcome for his entire life. At Roselle Park High School, he endured a hip injury while playing football, due to which doctors said he would never play any sports again. Loneker ignored the doctors and decided to work out intensely to rehabilitate himself. After two years off, he stepped onto a football field once again. Loneker, although just happy to play again with his friends, ended up with a scholarship to the University of Kansas.

== NFL career ==
After going undrafted in the 1993 NFL draft, he signed with the Los Angeles Rams as an undrafted free agent. He started in two of the four games he played in during his rookie season (1993). In 1994, he would start both games he played in. In his third season in 1995, he made one start but played in 13 games.

== Acting career ==
While playing in the NFL, a former teammate who was working as an agent called Loneker and told him he had a part for which he thought he'd be perfect. Loneker had never acted before, but made a tape for the audition and the producers hired him from his tape alone. He was surprised when he landed the role of "White Boy Bob" in Out of Sight. Loneker went on to roles in Rock Star, Superbad, Leatherheads, and Lakeview Terrace. When Loneker wasn’t auditioning for movie roles, he was a substitute teacher at Lawrence High School in Lawrence, Kansas.

== Personal life and death ==
Loneker died of cancer on June 22, 2017. He had two children, a son, Keith Jr., and a daughter, Kylee. His son also played football at the University of Kansas.

== Filmography ==
Year	Title	Role	Notes
1998	Out of Sight	White Boy Bob	
2001	Rock Star	Roadie #1	
2002	Big Shot: Confessions of a Campus Bookie	Big Red	TV
2007	Superbad	Wild Bill Cherry	
2008	Leatherheads	Big Gus Schiller	
2008	Lakeview Terrace	Clarence Darlington	
2012	Rhino	Donny "Rhino" Reinhardt	
2013	A True Story	Skinny Pete	
2014	Jersey Boys	Knuckles	
2015	Pass The Light	Coach Peters	
2015	Bad Ass 3	Pierre	
2016	Outlaws and Angels	Little Joe	
2016	What We've Become	Larry	
2017	The Vault	Cyrus	Posthumous release
