= The Candid Microphone =

Former American radio program

The Candid Microphone is an American radio program that was broadcast on ABC from June 28, 1947, until September 23, 1948, and on CBS from June 6, 1950, until August 29, 1950. It was adapted for television as Candid Camera. It used "secretly recorded conversations of all kinds of people as they react in real life to all kinds of situations." The New York Times described the show as "what amounts to a huge practical joke".

== Background ==
Creator Allen Funt said that the concept for The Candid Microphone came to him while he was in the Army. As he read a complaint column in the magazine Yank, the Army Weekly, he thought that it would be interesting to record something like that. At Camp Gruber in Oklahoma, he created a "gripe booth" in which soldiers could record their complaints. Funt knew, however, that people often became nervous in the presence of a microphone, so he considered the possibility of recording comments secretly with a hidden microphone and telling them about the recording afterward.

== Program ==
When Funt launched the program, his efforts were limited by the size and weight of recording equipment. The wire recorders that were available then weighed more than 100 pounds. He began by renting a 15th-floor office across from Grand Central Station, with microphones hidden in one room (set up as an office) and the recording equipment in an adjacent room. At least 15 microphones were concealed in the office. Funt pressed a button to signal an engineer in the other room to begin recording.

When a 27-pound portable recorder became available, Funt moved his activities out of the office, hiding the recorder in a travel bag or something similar and hiding the microphone on his body or treating it as a hearing aid. He spurred reactions in people by pretending to be a shoe salesman and saying that he had lost one of the shoes the customer wore in, asking a salesperson in a candy store to mash on chocolate candies to determine which ones contained nuts, and other activities.

The show occasionally employed guest pranksters, including Bela Lugosi, who appeared as "a shopkeeper of ghoulish curios" on the October 24, 1947, episode.

Participants were allowed to listen to the recording of their part of the program, and they had to consent to use of the material on the air. Their names were not used in the broadcasts. Most victims of pranks were good sports and gave permission for their comments to be broadcast. Compensation usually ranged from $5 to $15, sometimes reaching $25 for "obstinate cases".

== Production ==
Setting up stunts and recording people's comments began the process for each episode; then came the editing. Radio historian John Dunning wrote, "Imagination and cheek were the key ingredients, with a vast reservoir of patience," for the program to succeed. "For every show using half a dozen bits," Dunning continued, "at least 60 were recorded and thrown away. The editing process was painfully tedious, as many as 100 splices made in a piece of wire that yielded a three-minute stunt." Funt worked "14 to 16 hours daily with five assistants" to produce the show. The final version of each episode was recorded on a disk to be broadcast.

Funt was the producer, and Joe Graham was the director. Lamont Johnson, Funt, and Don Hollenbeck narrated the program. John Larkin, Dorian St. George, Les Griffith and Ken Roberts were the announcers. Ralph Norman and Bernie Green provided the music. In the announcer's remarks at the end of each episode, he gave the network's address and encouraged listeners to write to the program. He also suggested that they write "if there is someone you'd like to hear us catch off-guard".

== Recognition and legacy ==
In May 1948 the Radio-Television Critics Circle of New York included The Candid Microphone in its "first list of programs and individuals in broadcasting deemed worthy of the circle's commendation." It was one of two shows recognized for "outstanding program developments".

Funt donated recordings of The Candid Microphone and non-commercial educational rights to Candid Camera episodes to Cornell University (his alma mater) along with funding to enable students to use the material for education and research.

== Adaptations ==
=== Television ===
On August 10, 1948, the TV version of The Candid Microphone premiered on ABC at 8 p.m. Eastern Time. It was part of the first day of broadcasting for WJZ-TV in New York City. It used hidden cameras to record people's reactions in unexpected situations. The name was later changed to Candid Camera. The trade publication Billboard reported that ABC "completely overhauled the apparatus" on The Candid Microphone and three other radio programs to adapt them for television. Rather than showing "mere simultaneous duplication", the shows were revised "to take full advantage of their current visual asset", and new visual ideas were added.

=== Films ===
Columbia Pictures produced a series of short films based on the program from 1948 to 1951. The first film in the series included reenactments of some stunts that were favorites of the program's fans.

=== Records ===
In 1955, Jubliee Records issued "The Best of Allen Funt's Candid Mike', a long-playing album of excerpts from the program. A review in Billboard said, "The hidden mike gimmick is a good party item, and the off-guard sequences on this disk have their funny moments, altho [sic] scarcely in the 'best' category."

== Critical response ==
A review in Billboard said that the premiere episode of The Candid Microphone failed to meet expectations because "the aired sequences consisted simply of 'forced' situations rather than incidents during which the mike accidentally acted as an eavesdropper." The review called the show's concept "a fine idea ... that can produce hilarious top-notch entertainment" but said that better interviews were essential to achieving that goal.

Media critic John Crosby wrote that listening to The Candid Microphone was "a wonderful sport, like looking through keyholes but capable of infinitely greater variety." He commented that possibilities for locations of the hidden microphone seemed limitless because Funt "has scarcely any inhibitions". Crosby illustrated that point by citing Funt's recording of a woman's ranting in a beauty parlor. The review concluded with the observation, "We are at the beginning of the Age of the Involuntary Amateur ... The possibilities are limitless; the prospect is horrifying."

A review of the premiere episode in the trade publication Variety began by calling the program's premise an "amusing idea" but went on to say, "After the novelty wore off early in the show, thin substance began to show through and turned the session into a long half-hour." The review said that the narrator's introductions to vignettes were the best parts of the episode and suggested that the program might be better suited to a 15-minute format.

Glenn Kittler, in the Norfolk Virginian-Pilot, wrote that The Candid Microphone was both funny and educational. He said, "Called by critics the most original show in a decade, Candid Microphone has been acclaimed by doctors as a contribution to the study of psychiatry, and college professors have requested copies of many recordings to be used in schools of speech."

John M. Cooper, in a review distributed by International News Service wrote that The Candid Microphone was a variation on the man-in-the-street interview: "The only difference is that the man in the street doesn't know he's being interviewed."
