= The Vault (2017 film) =

2017 movie by Dan Bush

- Theatrical release poster
- Directed by: Dan Bush
- Written by: Dan Bush; Conal Byrne
- Produced by: Tom Butterfield; Alex Cutler; Luke Daniels; Alan Pao
- Starring: Francesca Eastwood; Taryn Manning; Scott Haze; Q'orianka Kilcher; Clifton Collins Jr.; James Franco
- Cinematography: Andrew Shulkind
- Edited by: Dan Bush; Ed Marx
- Music by: Shaun Drew
- Production companies: Redwire Pictures; Content Media; Culmination Productions; Casadelic Pictures; Jeff Rice Films; LB Entertainment; Imprint Entertainment; Psychopia Pictures
- Distributed by: FilmRise
- Release date: September 1, 2017
- Running time: 91 minutes
- Country: United States
- Language: English
- Box office: $346,729

The Vault is a 2017 American horror film directed by Dan Bush, written by Bush and Conal Byrne, and starring Francesca Eastwood, Taryn Manning, Scott Haze, Q'orianka Kilcher, Clifton Collins Jr., and James Franco. It was released on September 1, 2017, by FilmRise.

== Plot ==
After starting a fire in a nearby warehouse as a diversion, the five robbers—Leah Dillon; her sister, Vee; their brother, Michael; Kramer, the safecracker; and Cyrus, the muscle—initiate a bank robbery. An officer inside the bank tries to call for help on his police radio. Detective Tom Iger, who had just been in the bank, hears the call and decides to check it out. While walking back to check on the bank, he hears another anonymous call on his radio about the robbery.

The robbers find only $70,000 in the vault. Leah wants to leave, but Vee and Cyrus demand more money. The assistant manager Ed Maas says he will tell them where $6 million is stored as long as they do not hurt anyone. He tells them the money is in the basement vault which is a part of the old bank and hands them the key to the access door.

By now, police are stationed outside the bank and Leah is confused as to how they knew about the heist. The head teller, Susan, tries to connect with Michael, telling him he is a decent man. He tells her that he owes people a lot of money and his sisters are helping him rob the bank.

When Kramer successfully breaks open the vault, the lights flicker. A man in a white mask and what appears to be a group of the hostages attack him. He is pulled inside the old vault. Leah and Vee watch from the security monitors upstairs, but only Kramer appears on the screen. Thinking there are more people in the bank, Leah asks Cyrus to count the hostages that are gathered inside the safety deposit vault. The lights start to flicker again and the vault door closes with Cyrus and the hostages inside. As Kramer is repeatedly stabbed in the basement vault, Cyrus is overcome by the same group of hostages that attacked Kramer. The man in the white mask appears and grabs his gun, forcing it into Cyrus's mouth. When the vault door opens again, Leah goes in but Cyrus is nowhere in sight. Michael sees Kramer commit suicide.

Suspecting that Susan called the police, Leah interrogates her. Susan tells Leah about the robbery in 1982 where a robber in a white mask apparently "snapped" under the pressure and killed some hostages, forced some to kill each other and burned the rest alive in the old vault. The masked man was never caught or found. Vee turns up with a bag of money—but the bills are all from 1982.

After the police attempt to take Leah and Vee out with sniper fire, an outgoing call indicator on an office telephone catches Leah's attention. She picks it up and listens to the same robbery message that Detective Iger had heard earlier. Michael cuts into a water pipe to make an escape route and encounters a burned woman pleading for help. Vee finds Cyrus's body with his head blown off. Leah heads outside and releases one of the hostages. She asks Iger who made the phone call to the police, about the message. He answers that it came from the radio, not the phone. Leah goes back inside to the telephone and listens as the same message repeats, suddenly recognizing the voice.

Vee escapes through the water pipe. As Michael begins setting the place on fire to cover their escape, Leah lets the hostages go. As she attempts to escape through the water pipe, the masked man and un-dead hostages attack her. Michael distracts them long enough to allow Leah to escape before setting the bank on fire, sacrificing himself.

During the ensuing police interview of the hostages, Iger tries to find out why they know nothing about Maas. Susan says she's known all the employees inside the bank for ten years and has never seen the man before. Susan looks at the investigation wall and points to a picture of Maas. Iger tells her the picture is of someone who died in the 1982 incident. He was the assistant manager who had called the police to report the robbery but was shot by the robber. It was the same call Leah and Iger had heard the previous day.

Leah and Vee meet in a rural area. The police assume all of the robbers died in the fire, so they are free to start their lives anew. When their jeep fails to start, Vee checks the engine and is attacked by the man in the white mask.

== Cast ==
- James Franco as Ed Maas
- Scott Haze as Michael Dillon
- Taryn Manning as Vee Dillon
- Francesca Eastwood as Leah Dillon
- Q'orianka Kilcher as Susan Cromwell
- Clifton Collins Jr. as Tom Iger
- Keith Loneker as Cyrus
- Jill Jane Clements as Mary
- Michael Milford as Kramer
- Debbie Sherman as Lauren
- Conal Byrne as Kirkham
- Lee Broda as Nancy
- Alek Vayshelboym as Ben (credited as Aleksander Vayshelboym)
- Anthony DiRocco as Mark Fishman
- Dmitry Paniotto as Max
- Beatrice Hernandez as Pamela
- John D. Hickman as Marty
- Alan Pao as Detective Burton
- Rebecca Ray as Samantha Campbell
- Cristin Azure as Baghead Samantha
- Keenan Rogers as Baghead Thomas
- Robin Martino as Baghead Rebecca
- Jackson Beals as Detective Burton
- Benjamin C. Williams as SWAT

== Release ==
On November 5, 2016, FilmRise acquired distribution rights to the film. The film was released on September 1, 2017, by FilmRise.

== Reception ==
The review aggregator website Rotten Tomatoes gives the film a rating of 27%, based on 30 reviews, with an average rating of 4.3/10. On Metacritic, the film has a score of 50 out of 100, based on 5 critics, indicating "mixed or average reviews".
