= Francesca Eastwood =

American television personality

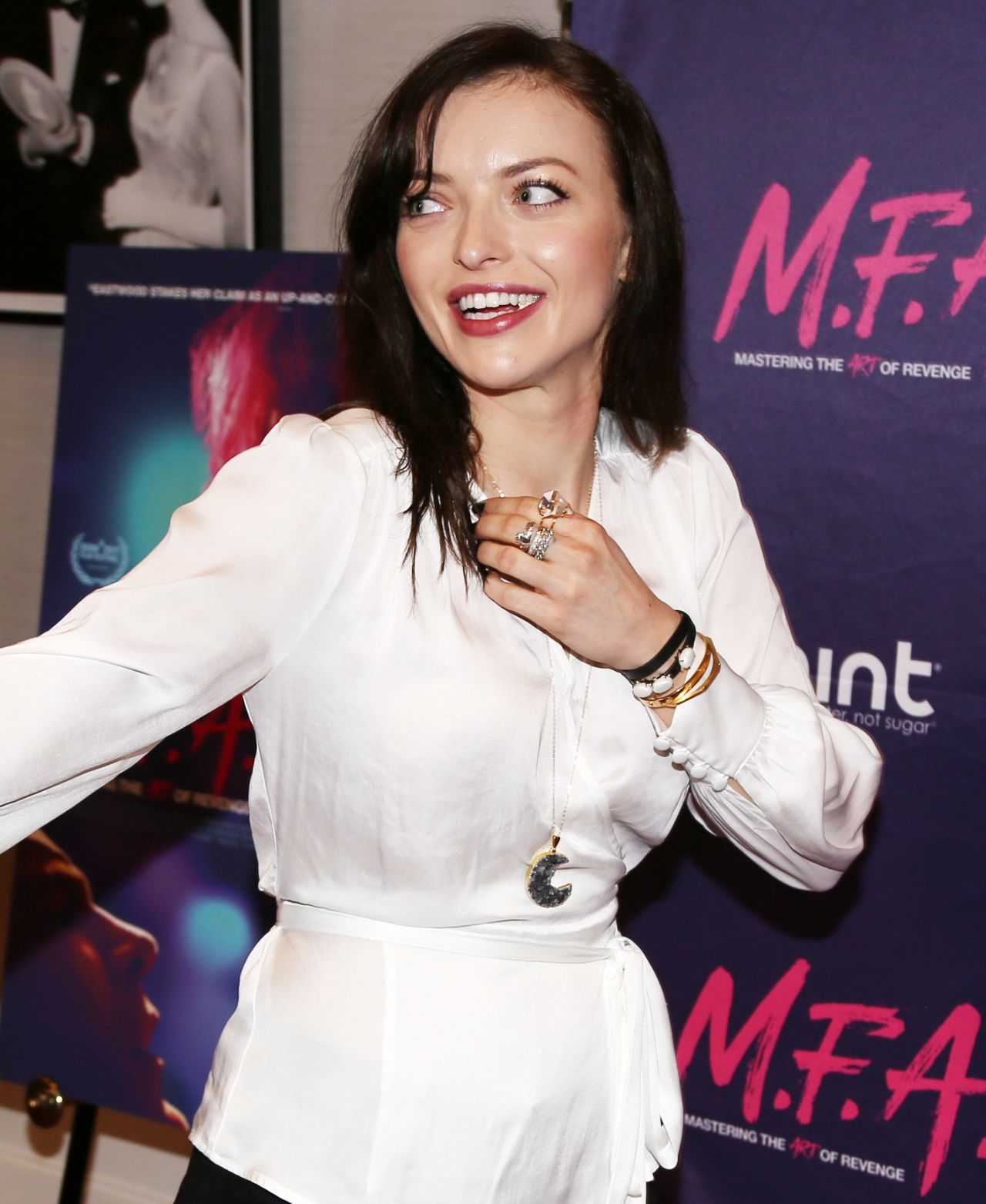
- Eastwood at a screening for M.F.A. in 2017
- Born: Francesca Ruth Fisher-Eastwood; August 7, 1993 (age 33); Redding, California, U.S.
- Occupations: Actress, socialite, TV personality
- Years active: 1995–present
- Known for: Mrs. Eastwood & Company
- Spouse: Jordan Feldstein (m. 2013; ann. 2013)
- Partner: Alexander Wraith (2017–present)
- Children: 2
- Parents: Clint Eastwood; Frances Fisher
- Relatives: Kyle and Scott Eastwood (half-brothers); Alison Eastwood (half-sister)

Francesca Ruth Fisher-Eastwood (born August 7, 1993) is an American actress, socialite, and television personality. The daughter of Clint Eastwood and Frances Fisher, she garnered attention starring with her family on the E! reality series Mrs. Eastwood & Company (2012). She is best known for her roles in films such as Jersey Boys (2014), Final Girl (2015), Outlaws and Angels (2016), M.F.A., The Vault (both 2017), and Old (2021). Eastwood also made several guest appearances on television shows such as Heroes Reborn (2015), Fargo, and Twin Peaks: The Return (both 2017).

== Early life ==
Eastwood was born in Redding, California on August 7, 1993, to actress Frances Fisher and actor and director Clint Eastwood. Her birth was kept secret for two weeks until somebody at the Shasta County Clerk's Office alerted the media. Through her father, she has seven known half-siblings: sisters Laurie Murray, Kimber Tunis, Alison Eastwood, Kathryn Reeves and Morgan Eastwood; and brothers Kyle and Scott Eastwood. Her mother is Jewish.

She attended Stevenson School in Pebble Beach, California.

== Career ==
Eastwood appeared on the 2012 reality television series Mrs. Eastwood & Company. It focused on her life, and those of her then-stepmother Dina Eastwood, and her half-sister Morgan Eastwood. During an early episode, she and photographer Tyler Shields, her boyfriend at the time, were filmed burning and destroying a $100,000 Hermès Birkin bag during a photo shoot. When this brought them both death threats and other negative attention, Shields said "People spend $200,000 on an album cover, they spend millions on catering for movies, they spend money to create things--that is all I am doing with this."

Eastwood was Miss Golden Globe for 2013.

In 2017, she and her mother Frances Fisher appeared in a Fargo episode, "The Law of Non-Contradiction", as the young and old versions of the same character.

== Personal life ==
As of 2013, Eastwood was living in Los Angeles and attending the University of Southern California.

On November 17, 2013, Eastwood married 35-year-old Jordan Feldstein, actor Jonah Hill's brother and the manager of Maroon 5, in a small ceremony in Las Vegas. Eight days later, on November 25, Eastwood filed for an annulment of the marriage.

In 2018, Eastwood had a son with trainer and actor Alexander Wraith.

In October 2024, Eastwood was arrested in Beverly Hills on a felony domestic violence charge. She was soon released from jail after posting a $50,000 bail.

In May 2025, it was reported that she was expecting a second child. On October 10, 2025, she gave birth to another son.

== Filmography ==
Film and television roles
Year	Title	Role	Notes
1995	The Stars Fell on Henrietta	Mary Day	
1999	True Crime	Kate Everett	
2012	Mrs. Eastwood & Company	Herself	TV series (7 episodes)
2014	Jersey Boys	Waitress	
2014	Perception	Model hallucination	TV series (1 episode)
2015	Wuthering High School	Ellen	TV movie
2015	Final Girl	Gwen	
2015	Mother of All Lies	Sara Caskie	TV movie
2015	Girl Missing	Jane Smith	TV movie
2015	Kids vs Monsters	Candy	
2015	Heroes Reborn	Molly Walker	TV series (3 episodes)
2016	Outlaws and Angels	Florence Tildon	
2017	MDMA	Jeanine	
2017	M.F.A.	Noelle	
2017	The Vault	Leah Dillon	
2017	Fargo	Vivian Lord	TV series (1 episode)
2017	Twin Peaks: The Return	Texas Waitress Kristi	Part 18
2019	A Violent Separation	El Camino	
2019	Awake	Diana	
2021	Old	Madrid	
2023	Clawfoot	Janet	
2024	Running on Empty	Nicole	
2024	Queen of the Ring	Mae Young	
2024	Juror #2	Kendall Carter	
2026	The Bay	Emma	IMdB
