= Lakeview Terrace =

- Theatrical release poster
- Directed by: Neil LaBute
- Screenplay by: David Loughery; Howard Korder
- Story by: David Loughery
- Produced by: James Lassiter; Will Smith
- Starring: Samuel L. Jackson; Patrick Wilson; Kerry Washington; Jay Hernandez
- Cinematography: Rogier Stoffers
- Edited by: Joel Plotch
- Music by: Jeff Danna; Mychael Danna
- Production companies: Screen Gems; Overbrook Entertainment
- Distributed by: Sony Pictures Releasing
- Release date: September 19, 2008
- Running time: 110 minutes
- Country: United States
- Language: English
- Budget: $20 million
- Box office: $44.7 million

Lakeview Terrace is a 2008 American crime thriller film directed by Neil LaBute, written by David Loughery and Howard Korder, co-produced by James Lassiter and Will Smith, and starring Samuel L. Jackson, Patrick Wilson and Kerry Washington. The film follows a racist Black Los Angeles Police Department police officer who terrorizes his new next-door neighbors (Wilson and Washington) because they are an interracially married couple. The title is a reference to the ethnically mixed middle class Los Angeles neighborhood of Lake View Terrace.

The film was released on September 19, 2008, received mixed reviews and grossed $44 million.

== Plot ==
African-American LAPD officer Abel Turner lives in the Lakeview Terrace neighborhood of Los Angeles with his two young children, Celia and Marcus, over whom he is very controlling. Chris and Lisa Mattson, an interracial married couple, move in next door to the Turners. On one of their first nights there they have sex in their swimming pool, unbeknownst to them in view of Celia and Marcus's bedrooms. When Abel sees his children witness this, he begins antagonizing the couple by repositioning his home security floodlights to shine into their bedroom window at night, and makes underhanded racial remarks to Chris regarding his marriage.

When the couple hear noises in their garage and find the tires of their car slashed, they suspect Abel and call the police, who do nothing because of Abel's status within the LAPD. Chris retaliates by shining his own floodlights into Abel's bedroom. Abel is suspended from the LAPD for abusing a suspect, inciting more fury within him. When he catches Celia talking with Lisa, he angrily slaps her for disobeying him and she and Marcus leave Abel to live with their aunt. Abel continues to harass the Mattsons by hosting a loud bachelor party with his colleagues, which Chris tries to intervene in but Abel has him sexually assaulted by a stripper. Chris later plants trees along the fence between their properties, which leads to a near-violent exchange, as Abel objects to having trees hanging over his property and cuts them down.

Lisa informs Chris she is pregnant, leaving Chris conflicted as he does not believe they are ready to have children. Chris encounters Abel at a local bar, where Abel tells him his wife died in a traffic accident with her white male employer; she was supposed to be working at the time, leading him to suspect she was unfaithful, and to believe white men feel entitled to have whatever and whomever they want. At the same time, Abel sends an informant to break in to the Mattsons' home in an effort to get them to leave, but when Lisa arrives home early they struggle and Lisa is knocked unconscious, but not before triggering their alarm. Chris races home, followed by Abel, who fatally shoots the informant as he tries to flee.

As Lisa recovers in the hospital, wildfires begin raging the hills surrounding Lakeview Terrace and residents are instructed to leave. Abel remains behind and surreptitiously enters the Mattsons' home, hoping to retrieve his informant's cell phone, which can incriminate him. Before he is able to find it, Chris and Lisa unexpectedly return home and he leaves before they see him. While the couple pack to evacuate, Chris finds the phone and calls the last dialled number; when Abel answers, Chris realizes he was responsible for the break-in.

Abel invades their home with a gun and struggles with Chris, while Lisa tries to escape in their car, which Abel shoots, causing it to crash into another vehicle. Chris subdues Abel and takes his gun, then goes to free Lisa from the car when LASD deputy sheriffs arrive on the scene. Unaware of who the aggressor is, Abel assures his colleagues the situation is under control and they instruct Chris to drop the gun. Remembering Abel's previous admission, Chris tauntingly implies to him that his belligerent attitude drove his wife to cheat. Enraged, Abel pulls out his backup revolver and shoots Chris in the shoulder; his true nature exposed, Abel is unceremoniously gunned down and killed by his former colleagues. Chris survives the shooting and tells Lisa that, despite everything, he is still looking forward to starting a home and a family in Lakeview Terrace.

== Cast ==
- Patrick Wilson as Chris Mattson
- Samuel L. Jackson as Officer Abel Turner
- Kerry Washington as Lisa Mattson
- Jaishon Fisher as Marcus Turner
- Regine Nehy as Celia Turner
- Jay Hernandez as Officer Javier Villareal
- Keith Loneker as Clarence Darlington
- Ron Glass as Harold Perreau
- Caleeb Pinkett as Damon Richards
- Justin Chambers as Donnie Eaton
- Lynn Chen as Eden
- Dale Godboldo as Dale
- Robert Pine as Captain Wentworth
- Bitsie Tulloch as Nadine
- Eva LaRue as Lt. Morgada
- Vanessa Bell Calloway as Aunt Dorrie
- Robert Dahey as Jung Lee Pak
- Ho-Jung as Sang Hee Pak

== Production ==
=== Real life inspiration ===
The plot was loosely based on real life events in Altadena, California, involving an interracial couple, John and Mellaine Hamilton, and Irsie Henry, an African-American Los Angeles police officer. The saga was documented in a series of articles in both the Pasadena Star News and the Pasadena Weekly beginning in 2002. Journalist Andre Coleman received a Los Angeles' Press Club Award for Excellence in Journalism for his series of articles in the Weekly. Henry was eventually fired by the LAPD for his actions.

=== Filming ===
The majority of the film was shot in Walnut, California, on North Deer Creek Drive. The scene where Abel Turner comes out of the police station to talk to his partner and other police officers was filmed in Hawthorne, California, on the corner of Grevillea Ave. & 126th St.

== Reception ==
=== Critical response ===
On Rotten Tomatoes, the film holds an approval rating of 44% based on 167 reviews, with an average rating of 5.50/10. The site's critical consensus reads, "This thriller about a menacing cop wreaking havoc on his neighbors is tense enough but threatens absurdity when it enters into excessive potboiler territory." On Metacritic, the film has an average weighted score of 47 out of 100, based on 28 critics, indicating "mixed or average" reviews. Audiences polled by CinemaScore gave the film an average grade of "C+" on an A+ to F scale.

Roger Ebert of the Chicago Sun-Times gave the film a very positive review, awarding it his highest rating of four stars and saying: "Some will find it exciting. Some will find it an opportunity for an examination of conscience. Some will leave feeling vaguely uneasy. Some won't like it and will be absolutely sure why they don't, but their reasons will not agree. Some will hate elements that others can't even see. Some will only see a thriller. I find movies like this alive and provoking, and I'm exhilarated to have my thinking challenged at every step of the way."

Mick LaSalle of the San Francisco Chronicle also enjoyed the film, saying: "In its overall shape and message, Lakeview Terrace is a conventional suspense thriller, but the details kick it up a notch. ... The fun of Lakeview Terrace is not in what happens but in how it happens." J.R. Jones of the Chicago Reader called the film "one of the toughest racial dramas to come out of Hollywood since the fires died down – much tougher, for instance, than Paul Haggis's hand-wringing Oscar winner Crash."

Dennis Harvey of Variety said that Lakeview Terrace "delivers fairly tense and engrossing drama" but "succumb[s] to thriller convention." Anthony Lane of The New Yorker said that "the first hour of the film ... feels dangerous, necessary, and rife with comic disturbance," but added that "the later stages ... overheat and spill into silliness." James Berardinelli of ReelViews gave the film two stars out of four, saying that "the first two-thirds of Lakeview Terrace offer a little more subtlety and complexity than the seemingly straightforward premise would afford, but the climax is loud, dumb, generic, and over-the-top."

Wesley Morris of The Boston Globe said that "the movie might have something to say about black racism, but the conversations go nowhere, and the clichés of the genre take over." Sura Wood of The Hollywood Reporter said: "[The idea of] a black actor cast as the virulent bigot, with the object of his campaign of harassment the young interracial couple who move in next door, could be viewed as a novel twist. But the film, absent a sense of place and populated by repellent or weak characters, soon devolves into an increasingly foul litany of events." Joe Morgenstern of The Wall Street Journal gave it one half of a star out of five, and called the film a "joyless and airless suspense thriller."

=== Box office ===
In its opening weekend the film grossed $15 million, placing it at number one in the United States. The film went on to gross $39.2 million in the United States and Canada, and $3.2 million in other territories, for a total of $42.4 million worldwide.

== See also ==
- List of films featuring home invasions
