= Awake (2019 film) =

2019 American crime thriller film

- Film poster
- Directed by: Aleksandr Chernyaev
- Written by: Elana Zeltser
- Produced by: Jessica Bennett; Andre Relis; Katerina Valenti
- Starring: Jonathan Rhys Meyers; Francesca Eastwood; Malik Yoba; William Forsythe
- Cinematography: Fedor Lyass
- Music by: Alex Kharlamov
- Production companies: VMI Worldwide; Archer Film Productions
- Distributed by: Cinedigm
- Release date: August 16, 2019
- Running time: 92 minutes
- Country: United States
- Language: English
- Box office: $169,919

Awake (also titled Wake Up) is a 2019 American crime action thriller film directed by Aleksandr Chernyaev and starring Jonathan Rhys Meyers, Francesca Eastwood, Malik Yoba and William Forsythe.

== Plot ==
Following a car accident where he is forced off of the road by another vehicle, a man awakens with amnesia while a corpse is found in the trunk of his car, the fifth victim of a serial killer that is stalking the area. The man, John Doe, is suspected to be the killer as a result, but escapes the hospital after taking Diana, a nurse who had befriended him, hostage. John becomes determined to prove his innocence and Diana agrees to help him; Diana’s father had been convicted of murder and she refused to believe his claims of innocence. He eventually hanged himself, before being exonerated years later, leaving Diana guilt-ridden.

John is haunted by visions of Julia Govern, one of the victims and decides to dig deeper in the hopes of finding answers. While visiting Julia's mother's house in McNabb, Illinois, John's memory flashes draw him to the nearby house of Sheriff Roger Bower who has been working with FBI agent Frank Ward to investigate the murders and John's role in them. When John breaks into the Bower house, he is attacked by Bower's son Oliver who appears to recognize him. However, John accidentally knocks Oliver out before he can learn anything about his identity from the young man.

As John searches for answers, he is hunted by Mark Rosovski, the man that forced him off of the road in the first place. Rosovski snaps the neck of Diana's friend Tom who was helping them and sets an ambush. Upon finding John standing over Tom's body, Diana abandons John, believing that he is really the killer and just manipulating her. Rosovski attempts to strangle John to death, but John manages to shoot him in self-defense, escaping with Rosovski's cell phone. From a text message, John learns that someone else sent him to Tom's home to kill John while Bower, investigating the scene with Ward, identifies Rosovski as a recently paroled hitman.

Diana visits the Bower house to speak with the sheriff about John and meets Oliver who informs her about the death of his mother, who resembles Diana, twenty years before and John's earlier attack on him. At the same time, John visits a library and does some online research into the murders. John learns that Bower's wife was murdered in a similar manner to the current murders and that the lead detective in Julia's murder, Michael Winslow, recently died in a gas explosion that consumed his home. Looking into reports on Michael's death, John discovers from a picture of the detective that he is in fact Michael Winslow. Realizing that the Bowers know the truth about his identity, Michael calls Ward, reveals his true identity and tells him to ask Roger Bower for more answers. When Ward calls Bower and asks about Detective Michael Winslow, the sheriff immediately becomes concerned.

Determined to find answers, Michael returns to the Bower house and confronts Oliver. Oliver reveals that he and Michael were best friends, but claims that Michael did something that put Oliver and his father through hell due to his obsession with finding out the truth about the murdered girls. During the argument, Michael spots Oliver's baseball schedule and realizes that it matches up with the timing and the locations of the killings. Michael is overpowered by Oliver who has taken Diana captive as well as his intended next victim. Oliver explains that the first victim was an accident, someone that he had unintentionally hit with his car, but she had reminded him of his murdered mother. Mentally ill, Oliver would target young women who resembled his mother, kill them in a fashion matching his mother's unsolved murder and then call their mothers so that the last thing they heard was their own mother's voice. Before Oliver can kill Michael and Diana, Bower returns home and shoots Oliver dead.

Sending Diana to call the police, Michael confronts Bower who confirms Michael's identity and explains that Michael had discovered that Oliver was the killer after pulling him over driving the last victim's car with her body in the trunk. Michael had called Bower first who promised to take Oliver in together, but he hired Rosovski instead to protect his son. Rosovski ran Michael off of the road on his way to meet up with Bower to make the arrest and stole his identification, believing that Michael had died in the crash, while Bower switched out his fingerprints for a John Doe from the morgue whose body he planted in Michael's house before setting the gas explosion to cover up Michael's murder. After learning that Michael had in fact survived, Bower sent Rosovski to finish the job while trying to frame Michael for the serial killings in order to protect Oliver as Bower knew that Michael would eventually figure out the truth again. Bower, who had previously had a father-son relationship with Michael before the events, expresses remorse for his actions and for not stopping Oliver sooner. As Michael meets with Ward, who has exonerated him thanks to Diana, and Oliver's body is removed from the house, Bower commits suicide out of guilt while Diana watches the events unfold from across the street.

== Cast ==
- Jonathan Rhys Meyers as John Doe / Michael Winslow
- Francesca Eastwood as Diana
- Malik Yoba as FBI Agent Frank Ward
- William Forsythe as Sheriff Roger Bower
- James Austin Kerr as Oliver Bower

== Reception ==
Awake has a 14% rating on Rotten Tomatoes, based on seven reviews with an average rating of 3.8/10.
