= Outlaws and Angels (film) =

2016 film

- Film poster
- Directed by: JT Mollner
- Written by: JT Mollner
- Produced by: Luke Daniels; Rosanne Korenberg; Chris Ivan Cevic; JT Mollner
- Starring: Chad Michael Murray; Francesca Eastwood; Teri Polo; Frances Fisher; Luke Wilson; Madisen Beaty; Ben Browder
- Cinematography: Matthew Irving
- Edited by: Christopher Robin Bell
- Music by: Colin Stetson
- Production companies: VMI Worldwide; No Remake Pictures; Redwire Pictures; New Golden Age Films
- Distributed by: Orion Pictures; Momentum Pictures
- Release dates: January 25, 2016 (Sundance Film Festival); July 15, 2016
- Running time: 120 minutes
- Country: United States
- Language: English
- Box office: $9,798

Outlaws and Angels is a 2016 American Western film written and directed by JT Mollner in his feature directorial debut and starring Chad Michael Murray, Francesca Eastwood, Teri Polo, Frances Fisher and Luke Wilson. The film received generally negative reviews from critics and grossed $9,798 at the box office.

== Plot ==
In Cuchillo, New Mexico, 1887, a group of five outlaws, led by Henry, are robbing the town bank, which culminates in a shoot-out with the residents of the town. A posse of bounty hunters, led by Josiah, is formed and are in hot pursuit, "only being a half-day behind them".

The gang is reduced to four with the death of a member who was shot during the robbery. They are met by Charlie's aunt and uncle, who have brought them supplies. Informed of an $8000 bounty on their heads, the outlaws kill the couple to avoid possible betrayal.

When the posse reaches the scene, Josiah speaks with the couples' granddaughter Lulu, who hid in the bushes when her grandparents were killed. She tells them that the robbers are headed East through White Sands, to make them more difficult to track.

The outlaws' number shrinks again when they shoot a second wounded man to end his misery. Reaching the farm where preacher George Tildon lives with his wife Ada and their teenage daughters, Charlotte and Florence, the fugitives make a plan to descend on them at dark.

Invading the house, they eat and drink whiskey while plotting to sexually assault the women. Florence catches Henry's eye; he calls her to sit on his lap. Ada and George plead with the men because Florence is only 15, but both are brutally subdued by Charlie and Little Joe. George says he is the minister of the chapel on the property, but nobody attends now because the town was ravaged by consumption.

Henry orders Little Joe to keep watch outside and take Charlotte with him. Henry wants a massage from Florence, and they go into the bedroom. He is put off when she tries to perform oral sex on him, saying she is an "adventuress". Henry says he wants to have sex with her, but he wants it done the proper way. Little Joe's advances are rebuffed by Charlotte, who is disgusted by him. Charlie rapes Ada while her husband is unconscious next to her on the floor.

Florence becomes enamored with Henry and plans to elope with him, to the dismay of her family. Florence pulls a gun on George, but Henry stops her from shooting him. She shoots and kills Charlotte.

Henry asks George why Charlotte could not bear children. He says it was because of the fever, but then confesses that, "sick with devil's seed," he impregnated Charlotte when she was 11. A botched abortion left the girl barren. George says he stopped molesting the girls long ago, but Henry replies that he knows George is lying.

Henry orders Little Joe to anally rape George, but calls him off, saying that he just wanted to scare the man. Florence enters and beats George to death with a shotgun, explaining she wanted him to suffer before his death. When asked why she killed Charlotte, she says it was because Charlotte enjoyed the incest.

Florence spares Ada, leaving a bag of gold coins from the robbery as the group leaves. When Josiah arrives at the farm, he finds Ada sitting on the stairs of the chapel, apparently in a catatonic state. He steals the bag of coins, but Ada shoots him to death as he walks away.

The group makes it to Mexico, after which Florence shoots all three of the surviving outlaws. Although Charlie dies instantly, Little Joe does not. Henry finishes him to keep him from shooting Florence. Florence apologizes to Henry, saying she really wanted to go with him, but the reward money is too good to pass up. Henry shoots himself in the head and dies. Florence beheads the corpses with an ax and bags them so that she can claim the bounty. Back at the farm, Florence shoots Ada.

== Cast ==
- Chad Michael Murray as Henry
- Francesca Eastwood as Florence Tildon
- Teri Polo as Ada Tildon
- Frances Fisher as Esther
- Luce Rains as Augustus
- Luke Wilson as Josiah
- Steven Michael Quezada as Alonzo
- Ben Browder as George Tildon
- Madisen Beaty as Charlotte Tildon
- Keith Loneker as Little Joe
- Nathan Russell as Charlie
- Connor Paolo as Connor
- Lela Rose Allen as Lulu

== Reception ==
The film received generally negative reviews from critics. On Rotten Tomatoes, the film holds an approval rating of 30% based on 27 reviews. The website’s consensus reads: “Outlaws and Angels doesn't do enough to stand out on the crowded canvas of nouveau Westerns -- doubly disappointing considering there's an Eastwood in the cast.” Rogerebert.com’s Nick Allen gave the film one out of four stars writing, “A movie hopped up on the period piece sadism within Tarantino’s regurgitation cinema, Outlaws & Angels gravely mistakes Tarantino’s audaciousness for its own originality.” Dennis Harvey of Variety wrote that the film was “superficially similar to “The Hateful Eight” in being a spaghetti-Western homage that takes place largely in one interior locale.” Justin Lowe of The Hollywood Reporter wrote that it "conveys ample shock value, but comes up short thematically".

== See also ==
- List of films featuring home invasions
