= Mrs. Eastwood & Company =

American reality documentary television series

- Francesca Eastwood, Dina Eastwood, and Morgan Eastwood (from left)
- Genre: Documentary
- Created by: Jonathan Murray; Mary-Ellis Bunim
- Starring: Dina Eastwood; Francesca Eastwood; Morgan Eastwood; Overtone
- Country of origin: United States
- No. of seasons: 1
- No. of episodes: 10

Production
- Executive producers: Dina Eastwood; Gil Goldschein; Jeff Jenkins; Jonathan Murray; Russell Jay
- Camera setup: Single camera
- Running time: 21–23 minutes
- Production company: Bunim/Murray Productions

Original release
- Network: E!
- Release: May 20 – July 22, 2012

Mrs. Eastwood & Company is an American reality documentary television series that premiered May 20, 2012, on E!. The show chronicles the lives of Dina Eastwood, then-wife of actor/director Clint Eastwood, and their daughters, Francesca and Morgan. Dina Eastwood manages the six-person a cappella group Overtone, who also live with the Eastwoods in their Carmel-by-the-Sea, California mansion. Morgan Eastwood stated via her personal Tumblr that the family declined to do a second season.

== Cast ==
=== Main ===
- Dina Ruiz Eastwood, a former television news reporter and television personality who was married to Clint Eastwood in 1996 until they divorced in 2014.
- Francesca Eastwood, Dina's 18-year-old stepdaughter. She is Clint's daughter from his previous relationship with Frances Fisher. She lives in Los Angeles with her boyfriend.
- Morgan Eastwood, Dina and Clint's 15-year-old daughter
- Overtone, an a cappella band from Johannesburg, South Africa. Dina discovered them during the production of her husband's film Invictus. Dina manages them and relocated the band to California in order to help them sign a recording contract.

=== Supporting ===
- Tyler Shields, Francesca's boyfriend who is a photographer
- Lisa Thrash, the Eastwoods' housekeeper
- Dominic "Dom" Ruiz, Dina's brother and Overtone's road manager
- Jade Marx-Berti, Dominic's wife, an actress and the granddaughter of Groucho Marx
- Clint Eastwood, Dina's husband and father of Francesca and Morgan, a famed actor, director and former mayor of Carmel

== Episodes ==
No.	Title	Original release date	U.S. viewers (millions)
0	"Meet Mrs. Eastwood & Company"	May 6, 2012	0.76
1	"A Band of Eastwoods"	May 20, 2012	1.09
2	"London Bridge"	May 27, 2012	0.96
3	"Material Things"	May 28, 2012	1.09
4	"Mayhem in Maui"	June 10, 2012	0.90
5	"If the Nose Ain't Broke, Don't Fix It"	June 17, 2012	1.27
6	"Mrs. Doubt Tyler"	June 24, 2012	1.13
7	"Don't Call Me Baby"	July 1, 2012	1.19
8	"Defensive Shields"	July 8, 2012	1.06
9	"Morgified"	July 15, 2012	1.19
10	"Splash of Freedom"	July 22, 2012	1.13
