= Candid Camera =

American hidden-camera reality television series (1948–2014)

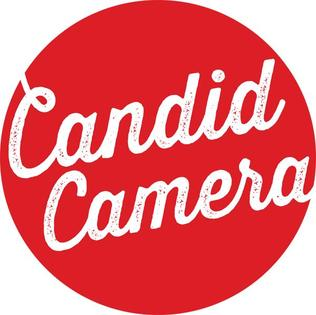
- Genre: Comedy
- Created by: Allen Funt
- Developed by: Allen Funt
- Presented by: Allen Funt (1948–92); Arthur Godfrey (1960–61); Durward Kirby (1961–66); Dorothy Collins (1961–63); Bess Myerson (1966–1967); John Bartholomew Tucker (1974–1975); Phyllis George (1975–1976); Jo Ann Pflug (1976–1979); Dom DeLuise (1991–1992); Eva LaRue (1991–1992); Peter Funt (1996–2004; 2014); Suzanne Somers (1997–2000); Dina Eastwood (2001–2004); Mayim Bialik (2014)
- Narrated by: Durward Kirby (1960–66); Bess Myerson (1966–67)
- Theme music composer: Frank Grant
- Country of origin: United States
- Original language: English
- No. of seasons: 38
- No. of episodes: 1,000+

Production
- Executive producers: Allen Funt (1948–92); Bob Banner (1960–67); Peter Funt (1996–2004; 2014); Ben Silverman (2014)
- Production location: Various on-location
- Camera setup: Single camera
- Running time: 22 minutes
- Production companies: Allen Funt Productions (1953; 1960–67; 1974–79; 1983; 1987–88; 1991–1992); Bob Banner Associates (1960–67); Vin Di Bona Productions (1991–1992); King World Productions (1991–1992); Candid Camera, Inc. (1996–2004; 2014); Electus (2014); TV Land Original Production (2014)

Candid Camera is an American hidden-camera reality television series created by Allen Funt. It originated as the radio programme The Candid Microphone in 1947 and premiered on television on August 10, 1948, on ABC under the same title. The programme was renamed Candid Camera when it moved to NBC in 1949.

The programme features practical jokes played on unsuspecting members of the public, whose reactions are recorded using concealed cameras. It became a regular CBS series in 1960 and subsequently returned in syndicated versions and television revivals, including runs in 1974–1979, 1991–1992, 1998–2004 and 2014.

== Format ==
The programme features concealed cameras filming ordinary people as they encounter unusual situations, including practical jokes involving specially designed props and staged scenarios. Once the joke is revealed, the participants are told the programme's catchphrase, "Smile, you're on Candid Camera."

Some segments feature interviews or conversations rather than practical jokes. Others involve unusual interpretations of art or situations designed to observe people's reactions to unexpected circumstances.

== History ==
=== Early television broadcasts (1948–1953) ===
Allen Funt adapted his radio programme The Candid Microphone, which debuted in 1947, for television in 1948. The first television broadcasts used the radio programme's title before the series became known as Candid Camera following its move to NBC in 1949.

The programme appeared on several networks during its early years, including ABC, NBC and CBS. It also aired in syndication and appeared in other television programmes before returning as a regular CBS series in 1960.

=== CBS series (1960–1967) ===
Candid Camera returned as a standalone programme on CBS in October 1960 after appearing as a segment on The Tonight Show and The Garry Moore Show.

The series ran for seven seasons and ranked among the ten highest-rated American television programmes during its first season. Funt was joined by Arthur Godfrey from 1960 to 1961, Durward Kirby from 1961 to 1966 and Bess Myerson from 1966 to 1967.

The series also featured appearances by guest performers and celebrities. One notable segment featured Pittsburgh traffic officer Vic Cianca, who later gained wider public recognition after appearing on the programme.

=== Syndicated revival (1974–1979) ===
Following a television special marking the programme's anniversary in 1974, Candid Camera returned as a weekly syndicated series that year. Funt resumed hosting duties and was joined by co-hosts including John Bartholomew Tucker, Dorothy Collins, Fannie Flagg, Phyllis George, Betsy Palmer and Jo Ann Pflug.

The series was produced in New York City during its first season before production moved to Nashville, Tennessee. The syndicated run ended in 1979.

=== Television specials (1983–1990) ===
An NBC special marking the programme's 35th anniversary aired in 1983. In 1987, CBS began airing a series of occasional specials featuring Funt and his son, Peter Funt, as co-hosts.

During this period, Peter Funt became increasingly involved in the programme. The specials continued into the late 1980s.

=== Second syndicated revival (1991–1992) ===
A new syndicated version, titled The New Candid Camera, premiered in 1991. Hosted by Dom DeLuise, with Eva LaRue as co-host, it was produced by Vin Di Bona Productions and King World Productions.

The revival ran for one season. In his 1994 autobiography, Candidly, Allen Funt expressed dissatisfaction with the version, particularly its hosting and the incorporation of commercial sponsorship into its segments.

=== CBS and Pax TV (1996–2004) ===
A CBS special celebrating the programme's 50th anniversary aired in 1996 and led to further specials and a new weekly series. The regular series began in 1998, with Peter Funt and Suzanne Somers as co-hosts.

In 2001, the programme moved to the Pax TV network, where Dina Eastwood joined Peter Funt as co-host. The series continued until 2004.

=== TV Land revival (2014) ===
In April 2014, TV Land announced a new ten-episode version of Candid Camera, co-produced by Electus and Candid Camera, Inc., with Peter Funt serving as co-host and executive producer. Mayim Bialik subsequently joined the series as co-host. The revival premiered on August 11, 2014, and was not renewed for another season.

=== Proposed revival ===
In April 2023, Village Roadshow Unscripted Television and Candid Camera, Inc. announced that they were developing a new version of Candid Camera hosted by Taraji P. Henson, who was also set to serve as an executive producer. Peter Funt was announced as a fellow executive producer. The announcement described the programme as being in development.

== Films ==
Funt wrote, narrated, directed and produced the theatrical film What Do You Say to a Naked Lady?, released in 1970. It was followed by Money Talks in 1972.

An adult-oriented version of the format, titled Candid Candid Camera, was also produced for cable television and home video during the 1980s.

== International versions ==
The Candid Camera format inspired adaptations in several countries. A British version aired from 1960 to 1976, with additional series during the 1970s. An Australian version, Candid Camera on Australia, aired on the Ten Network in 1989 and 1990. A Chilean adaptation, Cámara escondida, aired on Canal 13 in 1994.

Other adaptations and related programmes include the French series La Caméra invisible and Quebec's Les insolences d'une caméra. The German programme Verstehen Sie Spaß? began in 1980 and developed into a long-running hidden-camera entertainment show.

== Legacy ==
Candid Camera influenced the development of hidden-camera comedy and practical-joke television. Later programmes using related formats include Totally Hidden Video, Punk'd, Trigger Happy TV and Just for Laughs Gags.

The programme's footage has also been used for educational purposes. In 1964, Cornell University's psychology department obtained permission to maintain an archive of Candid Camera and Candid Microphone recordings for teaching and research. The collection has been used to illustrate human behaviour and social conformity.
