= Allen Funt =

American television producer (1914–1999)

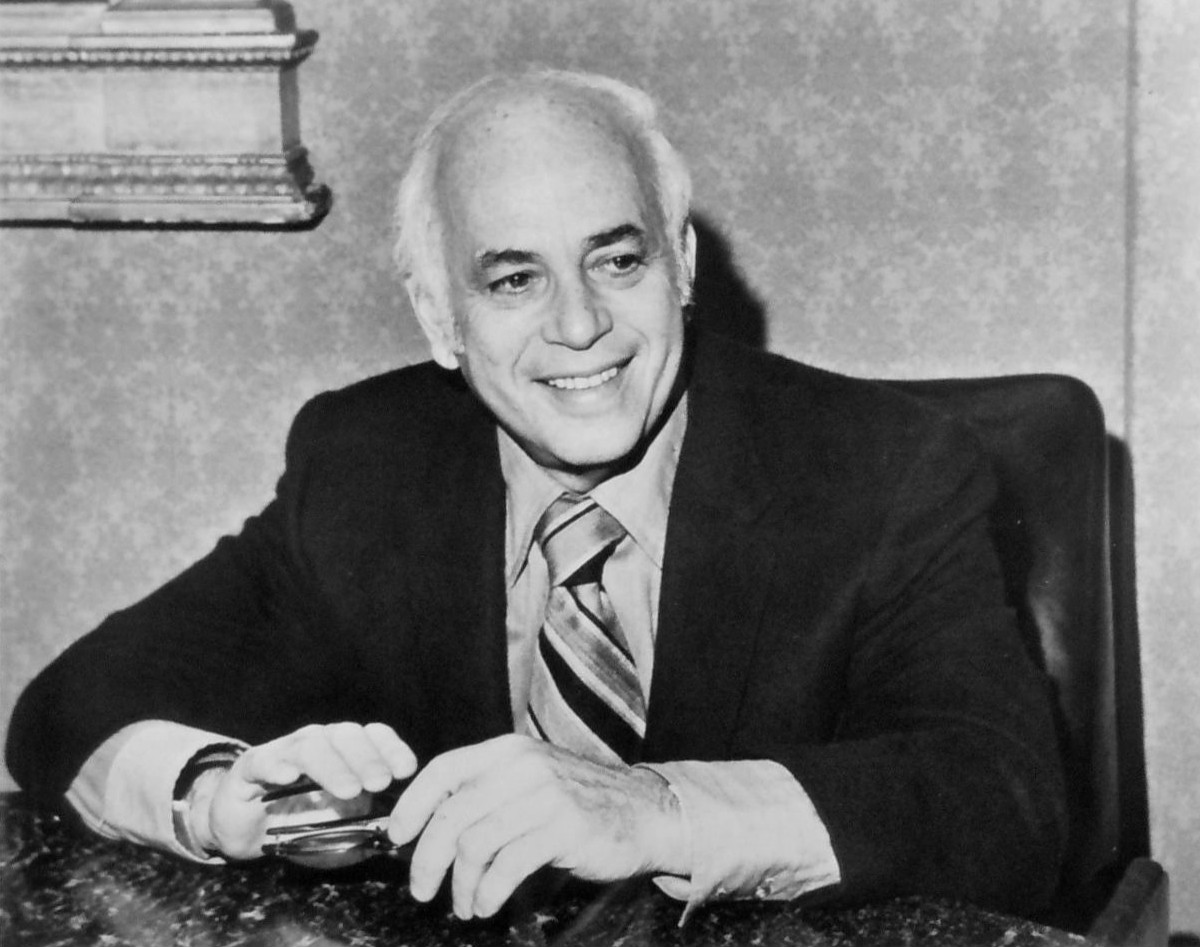
- Funt in 1972
- Born: Allen Albert Funt; September 16, 1914; New York City, U.S.
- Died: September 5, 1999 (aged 84); Pebble Beach, California, U.S.
- Occupations: Producer, director, writer
- Years active: 1948–1993
- Spouse(s): Evelyn Michal (m. 1946–1964); Marilyn Laron (m. 1964–1978)
- Children: 5, including Peter

Allen Albert Funt (September 16, 1914 – September 5, 1999) was an American television producer, director, writer, and television personality best known as the creator and host of Candid Camera broadcast on ABC from the 1940s, originally as a radio program, to the 1980s, as either a regular television show or a television series of specials. Its most notable run was from 1960 to 1967 on CBS.

== Early life and education ==
Funt was born into a Jewish family in New York City, New York. His father, Isidore Funt, was a diamond wholesaler, and his mother was Paula Saferstein Funt.

Funt graduated from high school at age 15. Too young to attend college on his own, he studied at the Pratt Institute. He later earned a bachelor's degree in fine arts from Cornell University, studied business administration at Columbia University, and returned to Pratt for additional art instruction.

== Career ==
=== Radio and television ===
Trained in commercial art, Funt worked for an advertising agency in its art department, but he eventually moved to its radio department. Among his first jobs for radio, he wrote for Truth or Consequences and assisted US First Lady Eleanor Roosevelt with her radio commentaries.

Drafted into the military during World War II and stationed in Oklahoma, Funt served in the Army Signal Corps, eventually making radio shows.

=== Candid Microphone ===
He began his signature program on ABC Radio as The Candid Microphone on June 28, 1947, and it ran until September 23, 1948. The program was revived on CBS from June 6 to August 29, 1950.

Funt soon experimented with a visual version by making a series of one-reel (10-minute) theatrical short films for Columbia Pictures. The series began in July 1948, as part of Columbia's "Film Novelties". Each film was called The Candid Microphone with the individual entries numbered. Unlike the TV version of the 1960s, where members of the production staff interacted with the unsuspecting victims, the Candid Microphone reels had Funt himself perpetrate all the stunts. The trade press enjoyed these shorts, which used a then-fresh format. The Exhibitor encapsulated a November 1949 release: "His first session is with a woman in an airline office who wants to buy a ticket to Denver. After he gets through, she almost decides to take the train. Next, he plays a clerk in a plumber's supply house, and tries to talk a character out of wanting to build a shower in a closet. The final sequence has him as adviser in the office of a honeymoon service, where he tries to sell a prospective bride a bill of the wrong goods." The reviewer gave this short one of the publication's rare "excellent" ratings. These theatrical shorts served as a springboard for Candid Camera, which premiered on television on August 10, 1948. The Candid Microphone shorts continued to play in theaters through 1956 and were reissued in the 1960s when Funt became a major television personality.

== Candid Camera ==
Candid Camera was broadcast on ABC, NBC, and CBS from 1948 to 1953, but only became a household word when CBS programmed a new version in 1960, on Sunday nights at 10 p.m. Eastern time, as a lead-in for the popular What's My Line? at 10:30. There the program found its all-time biggest audience. But CBS executives felt that Funt could not carry the program alone. They installed various masters of ceremonies to formally host the program and introduce the films. Funt was acknowledged as the program's creator and offered color commentary on the action. The first emcee was the familiar and folksy Arthur Godfrey during the 1960–1961 season. He was succeeded by TV host and announcer Durward Kirby (1961–1966), with former Your Hit Parade vocalist Dorothy Collins on hand when a woman was needed to pull off a stunt (as when she tried to convince service-station employees that her car wasn't working, when the entire engine under the hood was missing). Kirby was succeeded by game-show favorite Bess Myerson (1966–1967).

The show occasionally enlisted guest stars to participate in the stunts. Comedian Wally Cox, in character as a mild-mannered fussbudget, was shown earnestly trying to convince longshoremen to give up their hearty meat-and-potatoes dinners, and had them taste wheat germ and other health foods instead. Silent-era comedian Buster Keaton, always fond of practical jokes, made multiple appearances in the Candid Camera films of the early 1960s. He even supplied the show's famous tagline at the end of the broadcast: he stared at the camera and said with a deadpan expression, "Smile. You're on Candid Camera."

Funt became so synonymous with Candid Camera that whenever he appeared on other TV shows, his own show was always referenced. In 1964, he appeared as himself in an episode of the situation comedy The New Phil Silvers Show.

CBS canceled both Candid Camera and What's My Line? in September 1967, although it did show Candid Camera reruns as a daytime show from 1966 to 1968.

== Daring experiment ==
Free from the restrictions of broadcast television, with Standards and Practices executives telling him what he could not show on television, Funt decided to pursue an idea that could not possibly be shown on television. He produced a full-length motion picture, What Do You Say to a Naked Lady? (1970), that showed the reactions of ordinary people startled by a nude woman in unlikely places (when an elevator opened, hitchhiking nude, etc.). The film received the adults-only X rating. This proved to be a setback to Funt's career. He had always personified playfully mischievous stunts and good, clean fun, and now he was making X-rated movies. The public stayed away from the film, which landed "way down the list of grossers". Critic Gary Topp wrote, "Funt, who turns out to be more of an exhibitionist than many of his nude characters, has a definite problem with his decisions as to what is funny, and what is pure sensationalism." Funt found network-television doors closed to him, and they remained so until 1974. Undaunted, he made a second movie, Money Talks, which received only a limited release.

Funt returned to network television in 1974, when ABC broadcast a Candid Camera retrospective but did not sponsor a series. Instead, Funt sold a new Candid Camera series for syndication to local stations. It was broadcast from 1974 to 1979. Funt was now the full-fledged host, and his co-hosts included John Bartholomew Tucker, Phyllis George, Jo Ann Pflug, Betsy Palmer, and Fannie Flagg.

In 1982 Funt returned to the racier, nude-models version of the format, offering an adult-oriented series called Candid Candid Camera. These programs were shown on cable TV and sold to home-video markets.

=== Other pursuits ===
Funt donated his recordings and films to his alma mater Cornell University and established a fellowship at Syracuse University for postgraduate studies in radio and television "aimed at providing the broadcast industry with qualified black personnel."

He established a foundation that used laughter therapy for seriously ill patients by providing videocassettes of Candid Camera episodes. He also taught psychology at Monterey Peninsula College.

== Personal life ==
In 1946, Funt married Evelyn Michal, with whom he had three children, including Peter Funt. In 1964, the couple divorced, and the same year Funt married Marilyn Laron, whom he divorced in 1978. The couple had two children. Funt had seven grandchildren.

On February 3, 1969, Funt, his wife, and his two youngest children boarded Eastern Airlines Flight 7 in Newark, New Jersey, with a destination of Miami, Florida. En route, two men hijacked the plane and demanded passage to Cuba. Some of the passengers, having spotted Funt, believed the whole thing was a Candid Camera stunt. Funt repeatedly attempted to persuade them the hijacking was real, to no avail. The plane landed in Cuba, finally convincing the passengers. Funt and the other passengers were released after 11 hours of captivity.

Funt resided in Croton-on-Hudson, New York. His estate, White Gates, was sold to opera singer Jessye Norman in the early 1990s. In the early 1970s, Funt purchased a 1,226-acre (4.96 km^{2}) ranch 12 miles (19 km) south of Carmel-by-the-Sea, California, "where he raised Hereford cattle and quarter horses" He later purchased the nearby 11-acre (45,000 m^{2}) Bixby Ranch where he resided. Both ranches were eventually bought by The Trust for Public Land, which expected to turn the land over to the United States Forest Service.

After a stroke in 1993, Funt became incapacitated. He died in 1999 in Pebble Beach, California, 11 days before his 85th birthday. Candid Camera continued with his son Peter Funt as host.
