= Overtone (musical group) =

South Africana a cappella group

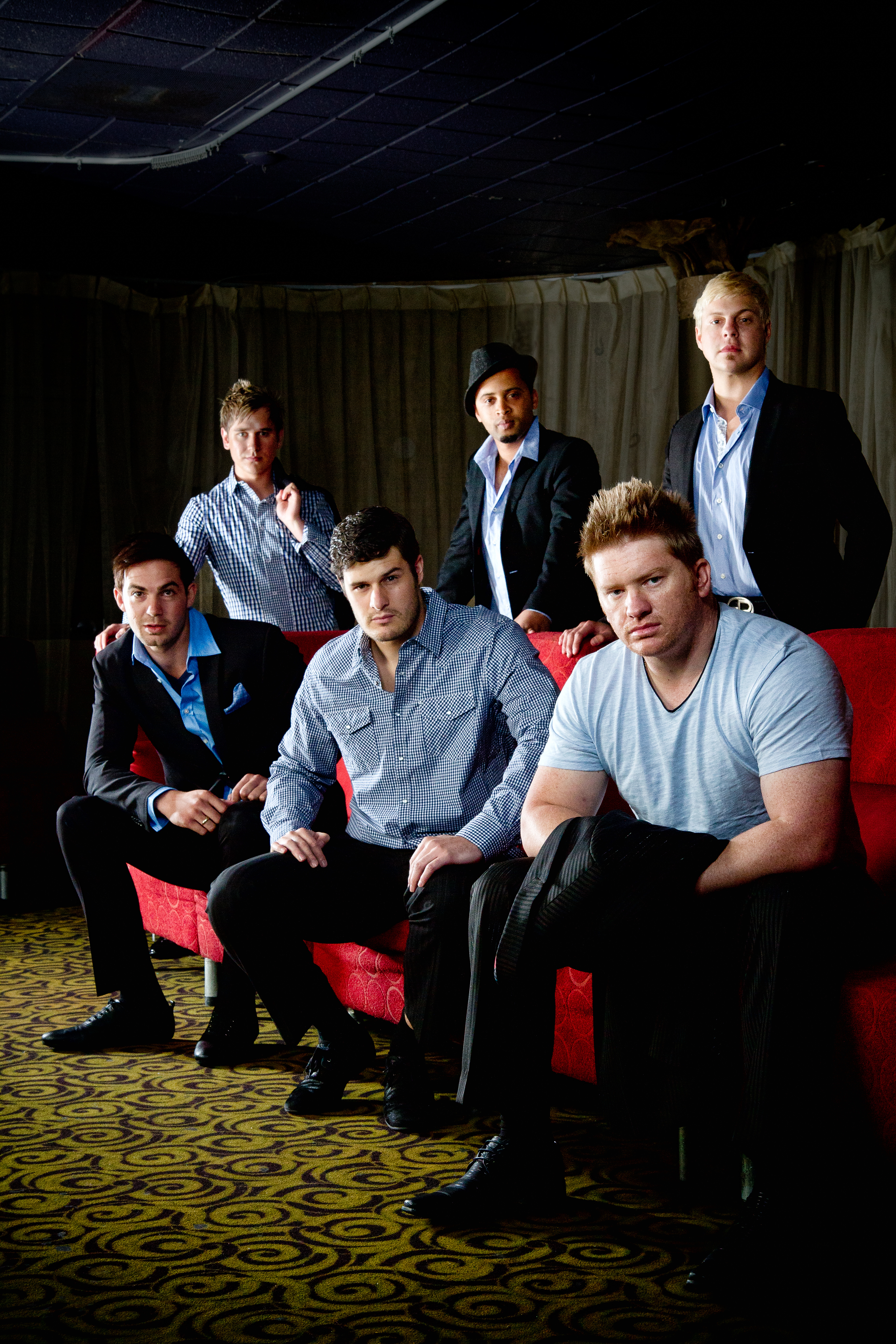

Background information
- Origin: Johannesburg, South Africa
- Genres: A cappella, pop
- Years active: 2006–2014
- Members: Eduard Janse Van Rensburg; Emile Welman; Riaan Weyers; Ernest "Ernie" Bates; Valentino Ponsonby; Shane Smit; Ruan van Zyl
- Past members: Anton de Jager
- Website: www.overtoneband.com

Overtone was an a cappella/vocal band that made its debut in 2006 and originated from Johannesburg, South Africa, best known for their performance on the Invictus soundtrack and their connection with Clint and Dina Eastwood.

== History ==
The founding members of Overtone were University of Johannesburg alumni Eduard Janse van Rensburg and Emile Welman. The two were roommates in their fraternity and sang in the fraternity's local serenade group. After graduating, they decided to pursue a career in the entertainment industry. The other members were known to them by previous music ties and were asked to join the group. They performed at private functions, corporate events, and various music festivals including Aardklop, Innibos and the Klein Karoo Nasionale Kunstefees.

In 2009 while doing a Queen tribute show in Cape Town, Dina Eastwood, wife of actor-director Clint Eastwood, by chance walked into the show. Clint Eastwood was in South Africa filming his movie Invictus, which is based on the 1995 Rugby World Cup. She was so impressed that she booked a private performance for the cast and crew of the film. A few days thereafter they were contacted and asked to record a demo of the song "Shosholoza", a popular traditional Ndebele song which has been considered the second national anthem of South Africa. Eastwood asked Overtone to do additional songs which led them to do the majority of the soundtrack. Dina Eastwood kept contact with the group and shortly before the release of Invictus brought them to the United States to help promote the film.

Overtone joined the promotional team in the United States where they appeared together with Clint Eastwood and Morgan Freeman on talk shows including The Ellen DeGeneres Show, The Late Late Show with Craig Ferguson and Lopez Tonight. Overtone was invited to the film première which was held in Los Angeles on 3 December 2009, and also did a performance for the guests at the after party. During one of the scheduled promotional appearances on The Late Late Show with Craig Ferguson, Dina Eastwood ran into rock band OneRepublic, whom she knew from a previous philanthropic project, and introduced them to her band. After singing a few songs in their green room, OneRepublic invited Overtone to open for them at their show later that evening at The Troubadour in West Hollywood and at a tree lighting ceremony the following day at the Americana mall.

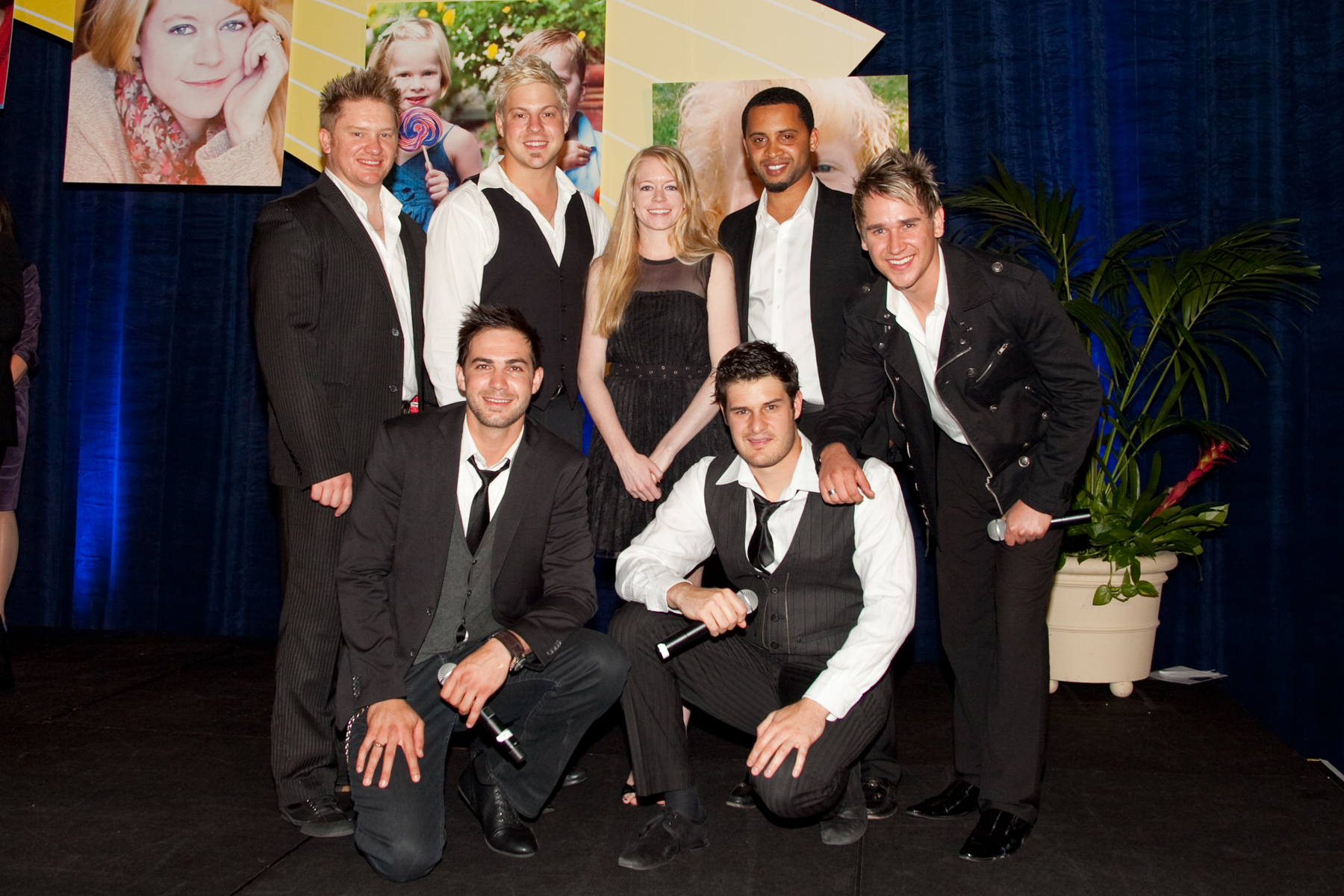
Overtone and Natalie Stack of Natalie's Wish Foundation

Overtone has featured as the opening act on the west leg of Corinne Bailey Rae's The Sea Tour, performing in Vancouver, Portland, Seattle and San Francisco.

In December 2010, the casino and resort tycoon Steve Wynn hired Overtone as the feature band for a three-month run in his Wynn and Encore luxury casino and resort in Las Vegas.

After Invictus, Overtone moved to California, where they were managed by Dina Eastwood, as depicted in the E! reality show Mrs. Eastwood & Company.

The band broke up in 2014.

== Philanthropy ==
Overtone has been connected to various charitable organisations both on home soil and abroad. In October 2009 they added their voice to the more than 50 international musicians and celebrities who released the world's first "musical petition" in the form of the reworked version of Midnight Oil's "Beds are Burning" for the Tck tck tck project which aims to draw attention to the global warming crisis. In joint efforts with many top South African artists Overtone performed at the "Hoop vir Haïti-inisiatief" (Hope for Haiti Initiative) concert to help raise funds for the victims of the 2010 earthquake. Overtone has also performed at two private functions in support of Charlize Theron's Africa Outreach Project (CTAOP) Other organisations Overtone has affiliated with include the Make-A-Wish Foundation and Natalie's Wish, a foundation dedicated to finding a cure for Cystinosis.
