= Peter Funt =

American actor/host/producer

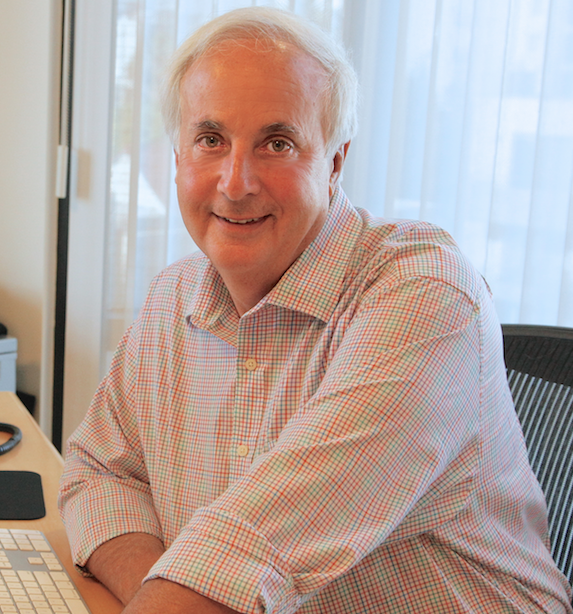
- Funt in 2019
- Born: 1947 (age 78–79); New York City, US
- Occupations: TV host, public speaker, journalist
- Spouse: Amy Suzanne Meltzer
- Children: Stephanie Funt, Danny Funt
- Relatives: Allen Funt (father)

Peter Funt (born 1947) is an American actor, host, and producer for the TV show Candid Camera. He worked for Denver radio station KHOW, the ABC Radio Network, The New York Times and various other media organizations. He is a University of Denver graduate.

== Early life ==
Peter Funt grew up in New York, where he worked summers on the set of his father Allen Funt's show, Candid Camera. He graduated from the University of Denver, earning his Bachelor of Arts in mass communications and journalism. During his time at the university he worked on the newspaper, The Clarion, as well as the radio station, KVDU. While a student, he interviewed Martin Luther King Jr. on his radio show in 1967.

After he graduated he worked at the Denver radio station KHOW and at the ABC Radio Network in New York. In 1970, he won the Silurian's Award for that year's best news reporting based upon Funt's coverage on ABC News of racial disturbances in Asbury Park, New Jersey. Afterwards he got a job as an arts and leisure writer for The New York Times. During his earlier career, he also authored a book titled Gotcha! on the lost art of practical joking and was the editor and publisher of the television magazine On Cable.

== Career ==
=== Involvement with Candid Camera ===
Candid Camera first aired in 1948 and was created by Peter Funt's father, Allen. Peter first appeared on Candid Camera at age 3, posing as a shoeshine boy who charged ten dollars per shoe. He joined the show professionally in 1987 when he became a co-host with his father. During this time the show was being broadcast on the CBS television network. In 1993, Allen Funt had a serious stroke, from which he never fully recovered. This required Peter to host the show full-time. Later in 1996, he hosted and was the executive producer of the Candid Camera 50th anniversary special. The show returned in 1996 for the revamped version of Candid Camera. In 1997, Peter co-hosted the show with Suzanne Somers. In 2001, the show moved to the PAX network and Peter then co-hosted the show with Dina Eastwood until 2004, and began another revival of the show in 2014 with Mayim Bialik. During his time on the show Peter was a producer, host and acted on the show. He also produced and hosted over 200 episodes.

=== Career after Candid Camera ===
Following his work with Candid Camera, Funt has written frequent op-eds for many nationally recognized news outlets including The New York Times, USA Today, as well as The Wall Street Journal. In these articles he offered observations and opinions about television and film. His essay about the evolution of television was later included in The Story of American Business, which was published in 2009 by the Harvard Business Press. He also has a weekly column distributed by the Cagle Syndicate.

In addition to developing new "Candid Camera" shows, Funt performs a live tribute stage show, "Candid Camera's Lol Tour," in theaters across the U.S.

Funt will frequently use clips from his time on Candid Camera to give a visual to the point he is trying to convey. He used both his speaking ability and his clips in publishing two business training videos, entitled "Too Close to the Customer" and "Expect the Unexpected". Both of these are still marketed frequently throughout the business community. His current presentation to business groups is called "The Candid You".

In addition to his publishing career, Funt is also the founder of the Monterey County Young Journalists program in California. The program offers hands-on training for high school students to help pursue their journalism goals. He has also inaugurated the Courtroom Journalism in Monterey County, as well as a statewide event for the Constitutional Right Foundation in Los Angeles.

=== Laughter Therapy Foundation ===
Funt has followed in his father's footsteps by taking over as President of the Laughter Therapy Foundation. Started in 1982 by Allen Funt, the foundation uses the immense comedic library of Candid Camera to send special tapes to terminally ill people throughout the country.

== Personal life ==
In 1986, Peter Funt married Amy Suzanne Meltzer. He has two children. He currently lives in central California.
