= Dina Eastwood =

American news anchor

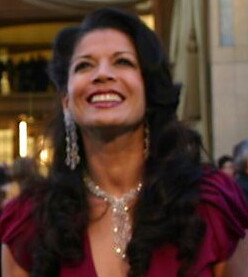
- Eastwood at the 2007 Academy Awards
- Born: Dina Marie Ruiz; July 11, 1965 (age 61); Castro Valley, California, U.S.
- Education: Ohlone College; Arizona State; San Francisco State University
- Occupation: News anchor
- Spouses: Clint Eastwood (m. 1996; div. 2014) Scott Fisher (m. 2016)
- Children: 1

Dina Marie Fisher (née Ruiz; born July 11, 1965), known professionally as Dina Eastwood, is an American reporter and news anchor. She is the ex-wife of actor and film director Clint Eastwood. She co-hosted the hidden camera television series Candid Camera (2001–2004) and starred in E!'s reality television series Mrs. Eastwood & Company (2012), that chronicled her life.

== Early life and education ==
Dina Marie Ruiz was born in Castro Valley, California, the daughter of Michael Ruiz, a math teacher and wrestling coach, who had been adopted by a Spanish/Puerto Rican couple as an infant in the Kalihi neighborhood of Honolulu. Michael and Mary were 19 and 21 years old when they had Dina. She has one younger brother, Dominic, who was formerly married to Groucho Marx's granddaughter Jade Berti. Dina grew up in Fremont, California, with her father teaching school in Fresno.

After graduating from Mission San Jose High School in Fremont, she attended several colleges beginning with Ohlone College, a community college in her hometown, in 1983. While a student at Ohlone, she anchored Newsline for Ohlone College Television. She briefly attended Arizona State University in Tempe, and in 1988, graduated from San Francisco State University with a Bachelor's degree in Broadcast Communications. In 2017, she earned a master's degree in creative writing from San Jose State University.

== Career ==
In 1990, she was hired as a reporter for KNAZ-TV in Flagstaff, Arizona, and later became news anchor. In January 1991, she was hired as a news anchor at KSBW in the Monterey-Salinas, California market. She held that position until November 1997. She has since made guest appearances on Action News and at KSBW's Share Your Holiday events. In 1998, she was host of the television show A Quest for Excellence, produced by the California Teachers Association and featuring students, teachers, and administrators and their daily challenges, as well as celebrity interviews. She co-hosted the hidden camera television show Candid Camera with Peter Funt from 2001 to 2004.

Beginning February 8, 2011, announced as Dina Ruiz-Eastwood, and billed on-air as Dina Eastwood, she "guest-anchored for KSBW" the 5 p.m. newscast with weeknight anchor Dan Green. She returned to anchor the 5 pm newscast for two weeks starting November 11, 2013.

Ruiz Eastwood was featured in the San Francisco State University's 2009 "Alumni Hot Shots" list.

She discovered the South African a cappella band Overtone during the filming of her husband's movie Invictus. The band then recorded songs that were used in the Malpaso Productions soundtrack.

Eastwood made brief appearances as a reporter in two of her husband's films, True Crime (1999) and Blood Work (2002). In 2012, she played the role of Vanessa Reeve in The Forger alongside her stepson, Scott Eastwood.

Eastwood joined The California Museum for History, Women and the Arts Board of Trustees and is a past chair. She has been a regular contributor for Carmel magazine since 2010, and a non-fiction editor to literary journal Reed Magazine. She has also worked as a yoga instructor.

== Personal life ==
She met actor and director Clint Eastwood in 1993, when she interviewed him for KSBW-TV. As Clint Eastwood recalled in 2007,

[S]he was doing an interview with me…[and] we got along really well and I guess we flirted a little bit because she took the film back to KSBW and one of her associates said, 'You're going to marry him.' Then we were attending a function out at Spanish Bay and [one of the hosts] said, 'Do you mind sitting with Dina Ruiz?' I said, 'No! Not at all!' We ended up holding hands and doing all that kind of nonsense and then we started dating and we're still dating. ... She's a very forthright kind of person. It's one of those things you can't put your finger on because it's pheromones or something.

They married on March 31, 1996. The couple has one daughter, Morgan Eastwood (born December 12, 1996).

In April 2013, Dina Eastwood entered rehab in Arizona, with People magazine writing that "the reported cause was stress".

In August 2013, she stated that she and Clint Eastwood had been living separately for an undisclosed length of time. Dina Eastwood filed for divorce on October 22, 2013.

In July 2016, Dina Eastwood married basketball coach Scott Fisher.

== Filmography ==
As herself
Year	Title	Role	Notes
1991–97; 2011; 2013	KSBW Action News 8	News anchor	
2001–04	Candid Camera	Co-host	
2012	Mrs. Eastwood & Company	Television personality	Main role; 10 episodes Also as executive producer

As actress
Year	Title	Role	Notes
1999	True Crime	Wilma Francis	Film
2002	Blood Work	Reporter #1	Film
2012	The Forger	Vanessa Reese	Film

== See also ==
- List of Afro-Latinos
