= Clint Eastwood =

American actor and filmmaker (born 1930)

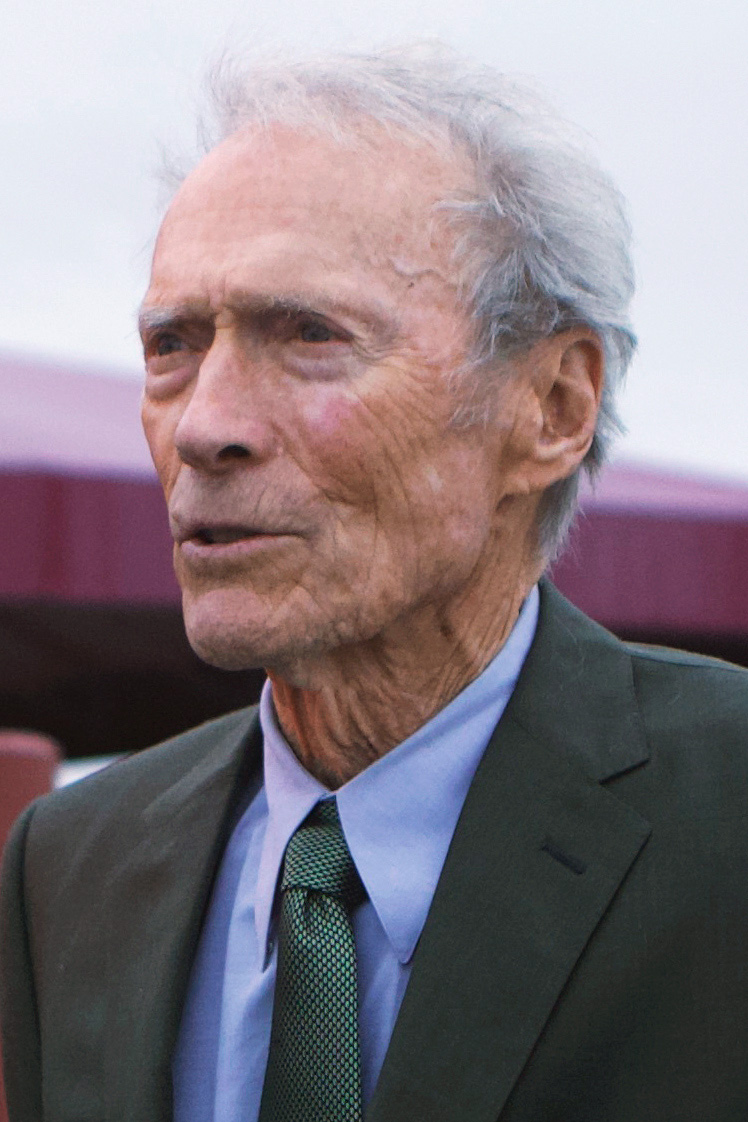
- Eastwood in 2019
- Born: Clinton Eastwood Jr. May 31, 1930 (age 96); San Francisco, California, U.S.
- Occupations: Actor; director; producer
- Years active: 1954–2026
- Organization: Malpaso Productions
- Works: Filmography; discography
- Political party: Libertarian (2008–present)
- Other political affiliations: Republican (1951–2008)
- Spouses: Maggie Johnson (m. 1953; div. 1984); Dina Ruiz (m. 1996; div. 2014)
- Partners: Sondra Locke (1975–1989); Frances Fisher (1990–1995); Christina Sandera (2014–2024; her death)
- Children: At least 8, (Note: Eastwood refuses to confirm how many children he has, and there have been conflicting reports in the media regarding the number.) including Kyle, Alison, Scott and Francesca
- Awards: Full list
- Musical career
- Genres: Western; country; traditional pop; jazz; western swing; film score
- Instruments: Vocals; piano
- Years active: 1963–2024
- Label: Warner Bros.

30th Mayor of Carmel-by-the-Sea
- In office April 8, 1986 – April 12, 1988
- Preceded by: Charlotte Townsend
- Succeeded by: Jean Grace
- Clint Eastwood's voice The speaking voice of Clint Eastwood, from the BBC program Front Row (recorded December 31, 2009)

Clinton Eastwood Jr. (born May 31, 1930) is an American retired actor and filmmaker. After achieving success in the Western TV series Rawhide, Eastwood rose to international fame with his role as the "Man with No Name" in Sergio Leone's Dollars Trilogy of spaghetti Westerns during the mid-1960s and as antihero cop Harry Callahan in the five Dirty Harry films throughout the 1970s and 1980s. These roles, among others, have made Eastwood an enduring cultural icon of masculinity. Elected in 1986, Eastwood served for two years as the mayor of Carmel-by-the-Sea, California.

Eastwood's greatest commercial successes are the adventure comedy Every Which Way but Loose (1978) and its action comedy sequel Any Which Way You Can (1980). Other popular Eastwood films include the Westerns Hang 'Em High (1968), The Outlaw Josey Wales (1976) and Pale Rider (1985), the action-war film Where Eagles Dare (1968), the prison film Escape from Alcatraz (1979), the war film Heartbreak Ridge (1986), the action film In the Line of Fire (1993), and the romantic drama The Bridges of Madison County (1995). More recent works include Gran Torino (2008), The Mule (2018), and Cry Macho (2021). Since 1967, Eastwood's company Malpaso Productions has produced all but four of his American films.

An Academy Award nominee for Best Actor, Eastwood won Best Director and Best Picture for his Western film Unforgiven (1992) and his sports drama Million Dollar Baby (2004). In addition to directing many of his own star vehicles, Eastwood has directed films in which he did not appear, such as the mystery drama Mystic River (2003) and the war film Letters from Iwo Jima (2006), for which he received Academy Award nominations, as well as the legal thriller Juror #2 (2024). He also directed the biographical films Changeling (2008), Invictus (2009), American Sniper (2014), Sully (2016), and Richard Jewell (2019).

Eastwood's accolades include four Academy Awards, four Golden Globe Awards, and three César Awards as well as nominations for three BAFTA Awards and a Grammy Award. He has been honored with the Golden Lion for Lifetime Achievement, the Honorary Palme d'Or, and an AFI Life Achievement Award. Bestowed two of France's highest civilian honors he also received the Commander of the Ordre des Arts et des Lettres in 1994, and the Legion of Honour in 2007.

== Early life ==
Clinton Eastwood Jr. was born on May 31, 1930, at Saint Francis Memorial Hospital in San Francisco, to Ruth (née Margret (Note: The birth name of his mother has been misspelled in countless references. Ruth's birth name was Margret, not Margaret. This according to state birth records. It was never Margaret, as has often been said.) Runner; 1909–2006) and Clinton Eastwood (1906–1970), who at the time lived in Oakland's Lake Merritt neighborhood. During her son's fame, Ruth was known by the surname of her second husband, John Belden Wood (1913–2004), whom she married after the death of Clinton Sr. Eastwood was nicknamed "Samson" by hospital nurses because he weighed 11 pounds 6 ounces (5.2 kg) at birth. He has a younger sister, Jeanne Bernhardt (b. 1934).

He is of English, Irish, Scottish, and Dutch ancestry. Eastwood is descended from Mayflower passenger William Bradford, making him the 12th generation of his family born in North America. His family relocated three times during the 1930s as his father changed occupations. Contrary to what Eastwood has suggested in media interviews, they did not move between 1940 and 1949. After settling in Piedmont, California, the Eastwoods lived in an affluent part of town, had a swimming pool, belonged to a country club, and each parent drove their own car. Eastwood's father worked as a manufacturing executive at Georgia-Pacific for most of his career. As Clint and Jeanne grew older, Ruth took a clerical job at IBM.

Eastwood attended Piedmont Middle School, where he was held back due to poor academic performance, and records indicate he also attended summer school. From January 1945 until at least January 1946, he attended Piedmont High School, but was asked to leave after writing an obscene suggestion to a school official on the athletic field scoreboard and burning an effigy on the school lawn, in addition to other infractions. He transferred to Oakland Technical High School and graduated on February 2, 1949.

Eastwood worked a number of odd jobs, including lifeguard, paper carrier, grocery clerk, forest firefighter, and golf caddy. He said he attempted to enroll at Seattle University in 1951, but instead was drafted into the United States Army during the Korean War. Don Loomis recalled hearing that Eastwood was romancing one of the daughters of a Fort Ord officer, who may have been encouraged to look out for him when postings were assigned. While returning from a prearranged tryst in Seattle, he was a passenger on a Douglas AD bomber that ran out of fuel and crashed into the ocean near Point Reyes. Using a life raft, he and the pilot swam 2 miles (3.2 km) to safety. Eastwood was discharged in February 1953.

== Career ==
=== 1954–1962: Acting debut and Rawhide ===
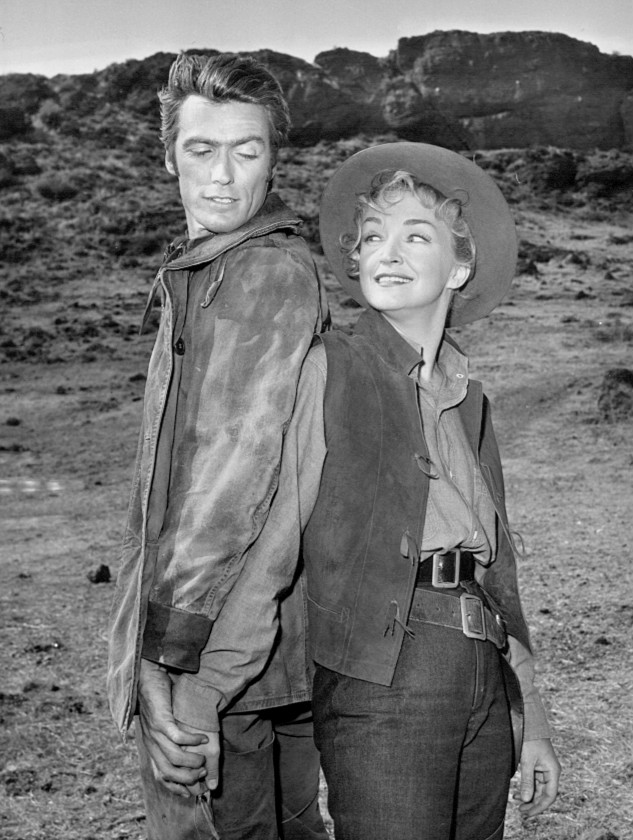
With Nina Foch in an episode of Rawhide, 1959

According to a CBS press release for Rawhide, Universal-International's camera crew was shooting in Fort Ord when an enterprising assistant spotted Eastwood and invited him to meet the director, although this is disputed by Eastwood's unauthorized biographer, Patrick McGilligan. According to Eastwood's official biography, the key figure was a man named Chuck Hill, who was stationed in Fort Ord and had contacts in Hollywood. While in Los Angeles, Hill became reacquainted with Eastwood and managed to sneak him into a Universal studio, where he introduced him to cameraman Irving Glassberg.

Glassberg arranged for an audition under Arthur Lubin, who, although very impressed with Eastwood's appearance and stature (then 6 ft 4 in [193 cm]), disapproved of his acting, remarking, "He was quite amateurish. He didn't know which way to turn or which way to go or do anything." Lubin suggested that he attend drama classes and arranged for Eastwood's initial contract in April 1954, at $100 per week. After signing, Eastwood was initially criticized for his stiff manner and delivering his lines through his teeth, a lifelong trademark.

In May 1954, Eastwood made his first real audition for Six Bridges to Cross, but was rejected by Joseph Pevney. After many unsuccessful auditions, he was eventually given a minor role by director Jack Arnold in Revenge of the Creature (1955), a sequel to the recently released Creature from the Black Lagoon. In September 1954, Eastwood worked for three weeks on Arthur Lubin's Lady Godiva of Coventry, won a role in February 1955, playing "Jonesy", a sailor in Francis in the Navy and appeared uncredited in another Jack Arnold film, Tarantula, where he played a squadron pilot.

In May 1955, Eastwood put four hours' work into the film Never Say Goodbye and had a minor uncredited role as a ranch hand in August 1955 with Star in the Dust, starring John Agar and Mamie Van Doren, the latter of whom he dated briefly. Universal presented him with his first television role on July 2, 1955, on NBC's Allen in Movieland, which starred comedian Steve Allen, actor Tony Curtis, and swing musician Benny Goodman. Although he continued to develop as an actor, Universal terminated his contract on October 23, 1955.

Eastwood joined the Marsh Agency, and although Lubin landed him his biggest role to date in The First Traveling Saleslady (1956) and later hired him for Escapade in Japan (1957), without a formal contract, Eastwood was struggling. On his financial advisor Irving Leonard's advice, he switched to the Kumin-Olenick Agency in 1956 and Mitchell Gertz in 1957. He landed several small roles in 1956 as a temperamental army officer for a segment of ABC's Reader's Digest series, and as a motorcycle gang member on a Highway Patrol episode. In 1957, Eastwood played a cadet in the West Point series and a suicidal gold prospector on Death Valley Days.

In 1958, he played a Navy lieutenant in a segment of Navy Log and in early 1959 made a notable guest appearance as Red Hardigan on Maverick opposite James Garner as a cowardly villain intent on marrying a rich girl for money. Eastwood had a small part as an aviator in Lafayette Escadrille (1958) and played a major role as an ex-renegade of the Confederacy in Ambush at Cimarron Pass (also 1958), a film that Eastwood considers the low point of his career.

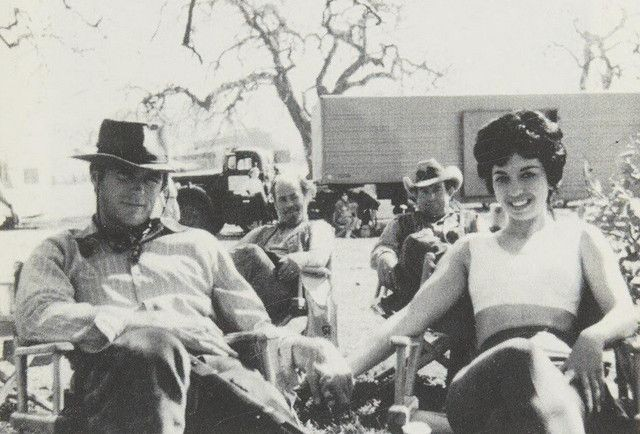
With stuntwoman Roxanne Tunis on the Rawhide set, circa 1959

In 1958, Eastwood was cast as Rowdy Yates in the CBS hour-long western series Rawhide, the career breakthrough he had long sought. Eastwood was not especially happy with his character; Eastwood was almost 30, and Rowdy was too young and cloddish for his comfort. Filming began in Arizona in the summer of 1958. It took just three weeks for Rawhide to reach the top 20 in TV ratings and, although it never won an Emmy, it was a major success for several years, and peaked at number six in the ratings from October 1960 to April 1961. The Rawhide years (1959–65) were some of the most grueling of Eastwood's career, often filming six days a week for an average of 12 hours a day, but some directors still criticized him for not working hard enough. By late 1963, Rawhide was beginning to decline in the ratings and lacked freshness in the scripts; it was canceled in the middle of the 1965–66 season. Eastwood made his first attempt at directing when he filmed several trailers for the show, but was unable to convince producers to let him direct an episode. In the show's first season, Eastwood earned $750 an episode. At the time of Rawhide's cancellation, he received $119,000 an episode as severance pay.

=== 1963–1969: Spaghetti Westerns and stardom ===
In late 1963, Eastwood's Rawhide co-star Eric Fleming rejected an offer to star in an Italian-made western called A Fistful of Dollars (1964), filmed in a remote region of Spain by a then–relatively unknown director, Sergio Leone. Richard Harrison suggested Eastwood to Leone because Harrison knew that Eastwood could play a cowboy convincingly. Eastwood thought the film would be an opportunity to escape from his Rawhide image. He signed a contract for $15,000 in wages for eleven weeks' work, with a bonus of a Mercedes-Benz automobile upon completion. Eastwood later said of the transition from a TV western to A Fistful of Dollars: "In Rawhide I did get awfully tired of playing the conventional white hat. The hero who kisses old ladies and dogs and was kind to everybody. I decided it was time to be an antihero." Eastwood was instrumental in creating the Man with No Name character's distinctive visual style and, although a nonsmoker, Leone insisted Eastwood smoke cigars as an essential ingredient of the "mask" he was attempting to create for the character. "I needed a mask more than an actor," Leone would later explain, "and back then Eastwood had only two facial expressions: with the hat and without the hat".

A Fistful of Dollars proved a landmark in the development of spaghetti Westerns, with Leone depicting a more lawless and desolate world than traditional westerns, and challenging the American stereotype of the western herο by offering a morally ambiguous antihero. The film's success made Eastwood a major star in Italy and he was rehired to star in For a Few Dollars More (1965), the second of the trilogy. Through the efforts of screenwriter Luciano Vincenzoni, the rights to For a Few Dollars More and the trilogy's final film, The Good, the Bad and the Ugly (1966), were sold to United Artists for about $900,000.

In January 1966, Eastwood met producer Dino De Laurentiis in New York City and agreed to star in a non-Western five-part anthology production, The Witches (Le Streghe, 1967), opposite De Laurentiis's wife, Silvana Mangano. Eastwood's 19-minute installment took only a few days to shoot. Two months later he began work on The Good, the Bad and the Ugly, again playing the mysterious Man with No Name. Lee Van Cleef returned as a ruthless fortune seeker, with Eli Wallach portraying the Mexican bandit Tuco Ramirez. The storyline involved the search for a cache of Confederate gold buried in a cemetery. During the filming of a scene in which a bridge was blown up, Eastwood urged Wallach to retreat to a hilltop. "I know about these things", he said. "Stay as far away from special effects and explosives as you can." Minutes later, confusion among the crew over the word "Vaya!" resulted in a premature explosion that could have killed Wallach.

I wanted to play it with an economy of words and create this whole feeling through attitude and movement. It was just the kind of character I had envisioned for a long time, keep to the mystery and allude to what happened in the past. It came about after the frustration of doing Rawhide for so long. I felt the less he said, the stronger he became and the more he grew in the imagination of the audience.

— Eastwood, on playing the Man with No Name character

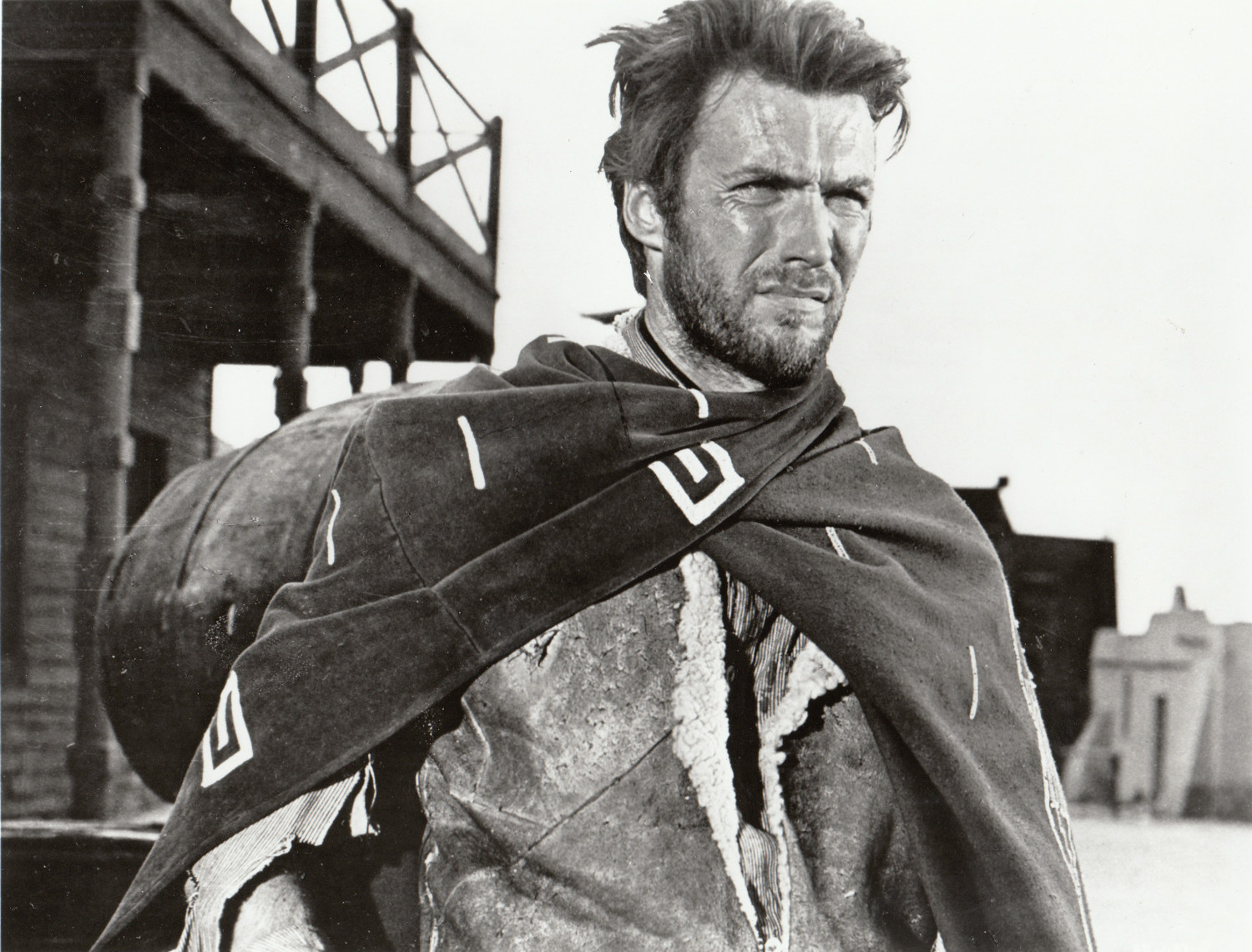
As the Man with No Name in A Fistful of Dollars (1964)

The Dollars trilogy was not released in the United States until 1967, when A Fistful of Dollars opened on January 18, followed by For a Few Dollars More on May 10, and The Good, the Bad and the Ugly on December 29. All three were commercially successful, particularly The Good, the Bad and the Ugly, which eventually earned $8 million in rental earnings and turned Eastwood into a major film star being ranked for the first time on Quigley's Top Ten Money Making Stars Poll in 1968 in fifth place. All three received poor reviews, and marked the beginning of a battle for Eastwood to win American film critics' respect. Judith Crist described A Fistful of Dollars as "cheapjack", while Newsweek called For a Few Dollars More "excruciatingly dopey". Renata Adler of The New York Times said The Good, the Bad and the Ugly was "the most expensive, pious and repellent movie in the history of its peculiar genre". Time drew attention to the film's wooden acting, especially Eastwood's, though a few critics such as Vincent Canby and Bosley Crowther of The New York Times praised his coolness. Leone's cinematography was widely acclaimed, even by critics who disparaged the acting.

Stardom brought Eastwood more roles. He signed to star in the American revisionist western Hang 'Em High (1968) alongside Inger Stevens, Pat Hingle, Ed Begley, playing a man who takes up a marshal's badge and seeks revenge as a lawman after being lynched by vigilantes and left for dead. The film earned Eastwood $400,000 and 25% of its net box office. Using money earned from the Dollars trilogy, Eastwood's advisor Irving Leonard helped establish Eastwood's own production company, Malpaso Productions, named after Malpaso Creek on Eastwood's property in Monterey County, California. The 38-year-old actor was still relatively unknown as late as a month prior to the film's release, as evidenced by a July 1968 news item by syndicated columnist Dorothy Manners: "The proverbial man in the street is still asking, 'Who's Clint Eastwood?'" Leonard arranged for Hang 'Em High to be a joint production with United Artists; when it opened in August, it had the largest opening weekend in United Artists' history. Hang 'Em High was widely praised by critics, including Archer Winsten of the New York Post, who called it "a western of quality, courage, danger and excitement".

Before Hang 'Em High's release, Eastwood had already begun working on Coogan's Bluff (1968), about an Arizona deputy sheriff tracking a wanted psychopathic criminal (Don Stroud) through New York City. He was reunited with Universal Studios for it after receiving an offer of $1 million – more than double his previous salary. Jennings Lang arranged for Eastwood to meet Don Siegel, a Universal contract director who later became Eastwood's close friend, forming a partnership that would last more than ten years and produce five films. Shooting began in November 1967, before the script had been finalized. The film was controversial for its portrayal of violence. Coogan's Bluff also became the first collaboration with Argentine composer Lalo Schifrin, who scored several Eastwood films in the 1970s and 1980s, including the Dirty Harry films.

Eastwood was paid $750,000 for the war epic Where Eagles Dare (1968), about a World War II squad parachuting into a Gestapo stronghold in the Alps. Richard Burton played the squad's commander, with Eastwood as his right-hand man. Eastwood was also cast as Two-Face in the Batman television show, but the series was canceled before filming began.

Eastwood then branched out to co-star in a musical, Paint Your Wagon (1969). Eastwood and Lee Marvin play gold miners who buy a Mormon settler's less favored wife (Jean Seberg) at an auction. Bad weather and delays plagued the production, and the film's budget eventually exceeded $20 million, which was high for the time. The film was not a critical or commercial success, but was nominated for a Golden Globe Award for Best Motion Picture – Musical or Comedy.

=== 1970–1989: Directorial debut and Dirty Harry ===
Eastwood starred with Shirley MacLaine in the western Two Mules for Sister Sara (1970), directed by Don Siegel. The film follows an American mercenary, who becomes mixed up with a prostitute disguised as a nun, and ends up helping a group of Juarista rebels during the reign of Emperor Maximilian I of Mexico. Eastwood again played a mysterious stranger – unshaven, wearing a serape-like vest, and smoking a cigar. Although it received moderate reviews, the film is listed in The New York Times Guide to the Best 1,000 Movies Ever Made. Around the same time, Eastwood starred as one of a group of Americans who steals a fortune in gold from the Nazis, in the World War II film Kelly's Heroes (also 1970), with Donald Sutherland and Telly Savalas. Kelly's Heroes was the last film Eastwood appeared in that was not produced by his own Malpaso Productions. Shot on location in Yugoslavia and London, the film received mostly a positive reception and its anti-war sentiments were recognized. Siegel directed Eastwood's next film, The Beguiled (1971), a tale of a wounded Union soldier, held captive by the sexually repressed matron (played by Geraldine Page) of a Southern girls' school. Upon release the film received major recognition in France and is considered one of Eastwood's finest works by French critics. However, it grossed less than $1 million and, according to Eastwood and Lang, flopped due to poor publicity and the "emasculated" role of Eastwood.

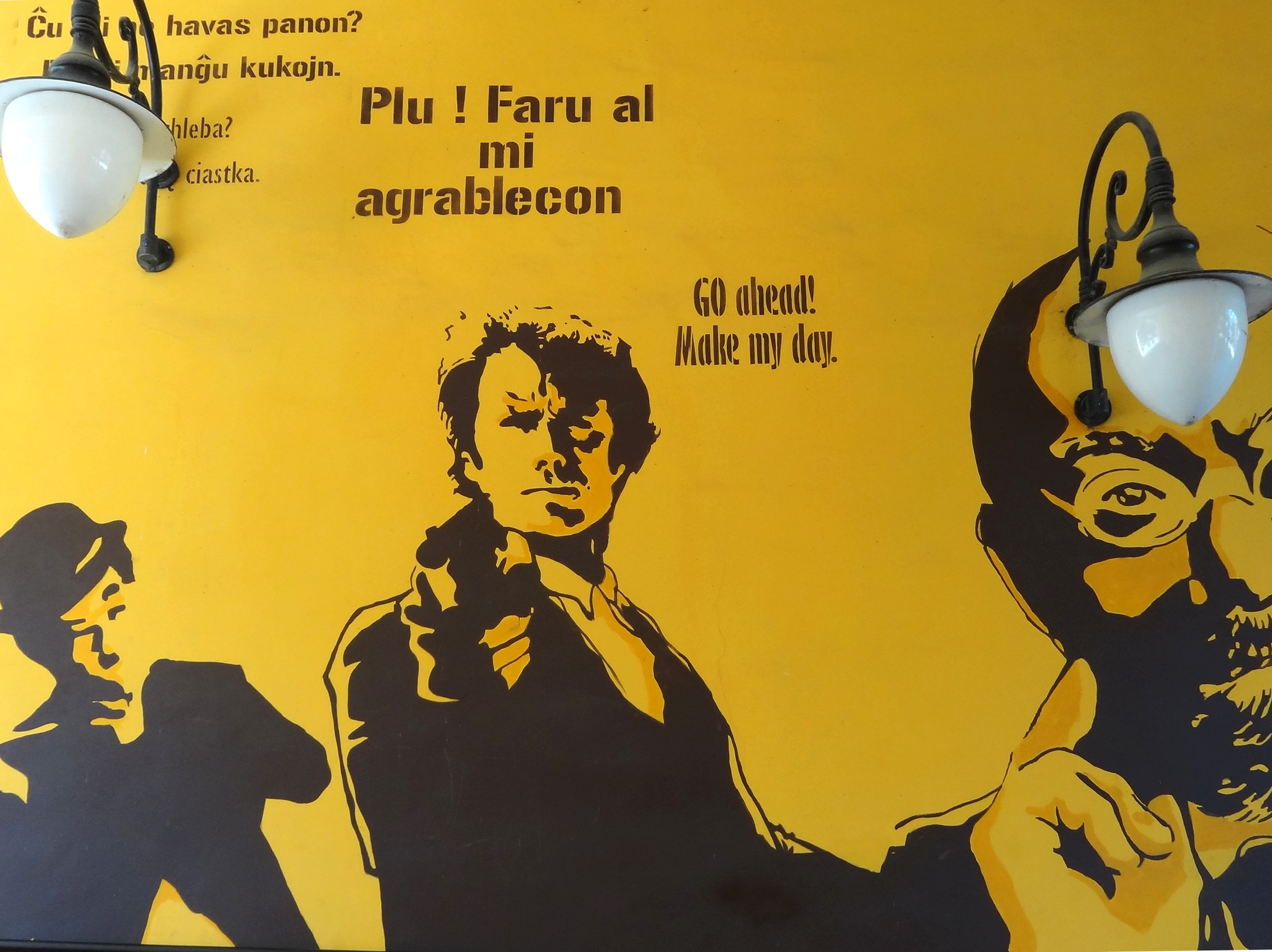
A mural in Warsaw, Poland, referring to Eastwood's Dirty Harry character with a quote in English and Esperanto

Eastwood's career reached a turning point in 1971. Before Irving Leonard died, he and Eastwood had discussed the idea of Malpaso producing Play Misty for Me, a film that was to give Eastwood the artistic control he desired, and his debut as a director. The script was about a jazz disc jockey named Dave (Eastwood), who has a casual affair with Evelyn (Jessica Walter), a listener who had been calling the radio station repeatedly at night, asking him to play her favorite song – Erroll Garner's "Misty". When Dave ends their relationship, the unhinged Evelyn becomes a murderous stalker. Filming commenced in Monterey in September 1970 and included footage of that year's Monterey Jazz Festival. The film was highly acclaimed with critics, such as Jay Cocks in Time, Andrew Sarris in the Village Voice, and Archer Winsten in the New York Post all praising the film, as well as Eastwood's directorial skills and performance. Walter was nominated for a Golden Globe Best Actress Award (Drama), for her performance in the film.

I know what you're thinking – "Did he fire six shots or only five?" Well, to tell you the truth, in all this excitement, I've kinda lost track myself. But, being as this is a .44 Magnum, the most powerful handgun in the world and would blow your head clean off, you've got to ask yourself one question: "Do I feel lucky?" Well, do you, punk?

— Eastwood, in Dirty Harry

Dirty Harry (1971), written by Harry and Rita Fink, centers on a hard-edged New York City (later changed to San Francisco) police inspector named Harry Callahan who is determined to stop a psychotic killer by any means. Dirty Harry has been described as being arguably Eastwood's most memorable character, and the film has been credited with inventing the "loose-cannon cop" genre. Author Eric Lichtenfeld argues that Eastwood's role as Dirty Harry established the "first true archetype" of the action film genre. His lines (quoted above) are regarded by firearms historians, such as Garry James and Richard Venola, as the force that catapulted the ownership of .44 Magnum revolvers to new heights in the United States; specifically the Smith & Wesson Model 29 carried by Harry Callahan. Dirty Harry, released in December 1971, earned $22 million in the United States and Canada. It was Siegel's highest-grossing film and the start of a series of films featuring the character Harry Callahan. Although a number of critics praised Eastwood's performance as Dirty Harry, such as Jay Cocks who described him as "giving his best performance so far, tense, tough, full of implicit identification with his character", the film was also widely criticized as being fascistic. After having been second for the past two years, Eastwood was voted first in Quigley's Top Ten Money Making Stars Poll in 1972 and again in 1973.

Following Sean Connery's announcement that he would not play James Bond again, Eastwood was offered the role but turned it down, saying, "that was someone else's gig. That's Sean's deal. It didn't feel right for me to be doing it." He next starred in the loner Western Joe Kidd (1972), based on a character inspired by Reies Lopez Tijerina, who stormed a courthouse in Tierra Amarilla, New Mexico, in June 1967. During filming, Eastwood suffered symptoms of a bronchial infection and several panic attacks. Joe Kidd received a mixed reception, with Roger Greenspun of The New York Times writing that it was unremarkable, with foolish symbolism and sloppy editing, although he praised Eastwood's performance.

Eastwood's first western as director was High Plains Drifter (1973), in which he also starred. The film had a moral and supernatural theme, later emulated in Pale Rider. The plot follows a mysterious stranger (Eastwood) who arrives in a brooding Western town where the people hire him to protect them against three soon-to-be-released felons. There remains confusion during the film as to whether the stranger is the brother of the deputy, whom the felons lynched and murdered, or his ghost. Holes in the plot were filled with black humor and allegory, influenced by Leone. The revisionist film received a mixed reception, but was a major box-office success. A number of critics thought Eastwood's directing was "as derivative as it was expressive", with Arthur Knight of the Saturday Review remarking that Eastwood had "absorbed the approaches of Siegel and Leone and fused them with his own paranoid vision of society". John Wayne, who had declined a role in the film, sent a letter to Eastwood soon after the film's release in which he complained that "The townspeople did not represent the true spirit of the American pioneer, the spirit that made America great."

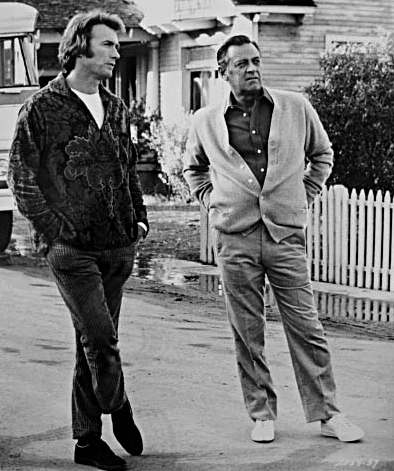
Directing William Holden in Breezy, 1972

Eastwood next turned his attention towards Breezy (1973), a film starring William Holden and Kay Lenz about love blossoming between a middle-aged man and a teenage girl. Various actresses had lobbied for the title role, including Eastwood's future longtime companion Sondra Locke, who at 29 was nearly twice the character's age. (Note: Locke's age was misstated in 50 years' worth of publications, including every Eastwood biography on the market during her lifetime. At no point during their post-split mutual disparagements did the discrepancy come up, and it was not until after Locke's death that the press consistently acknowledged she was born in 1944. If Eastwood knew Locke was older than she always pretended to be, he never let on, and allowed her lie to go uncorrected for decades.) The film, shot very quickly and efficiently by Frank Stanley, came in $1 million under budget and was finished three days ahead of schedule. Breezy was not a major critical or commercial success. Eastwood then stepped back in front of the camera to reprise his role as Harry Callahan in Magnum Force (1973), a sequel to Dirty Harry, about a group of rogue young officers (among them David Soul, Robert Urich, and Tim Matheson) in the San Francisco Police Department who systematically exterminate the city's worst criminals. Although the film was a major success after release, grossing $58.1 million in the United States (a record for Eastwood), it was not a critical success. The New York Times critic Nora Sayre panned the often contradictory moral themes of the film, while the paper's Frank Rich called it "the same old stuff".

Eastwood teamed up with Jeff Bridges and George Kennedy in the buddy action caper Thunderbolt and Lightfoot (1974), a road movie about a veteran bank robber Thunderbolt (Eastwood) and a young con man drifter, Lightfoot (Bridges). On its release in spring 1974, the film was praised for its offbeat comedy mixed with high suspense and tragedy—but was only a modest success at the box office, earning $32.4 million. Eastwood's acting was noted by critics, but was overshadowed by Bridges, who was nominated for an Academy Award for Best Supporting Actor. Eastwood reportedly fumed at the lack of Academy Award recognition for him and swore that he would never work for United Artists again.

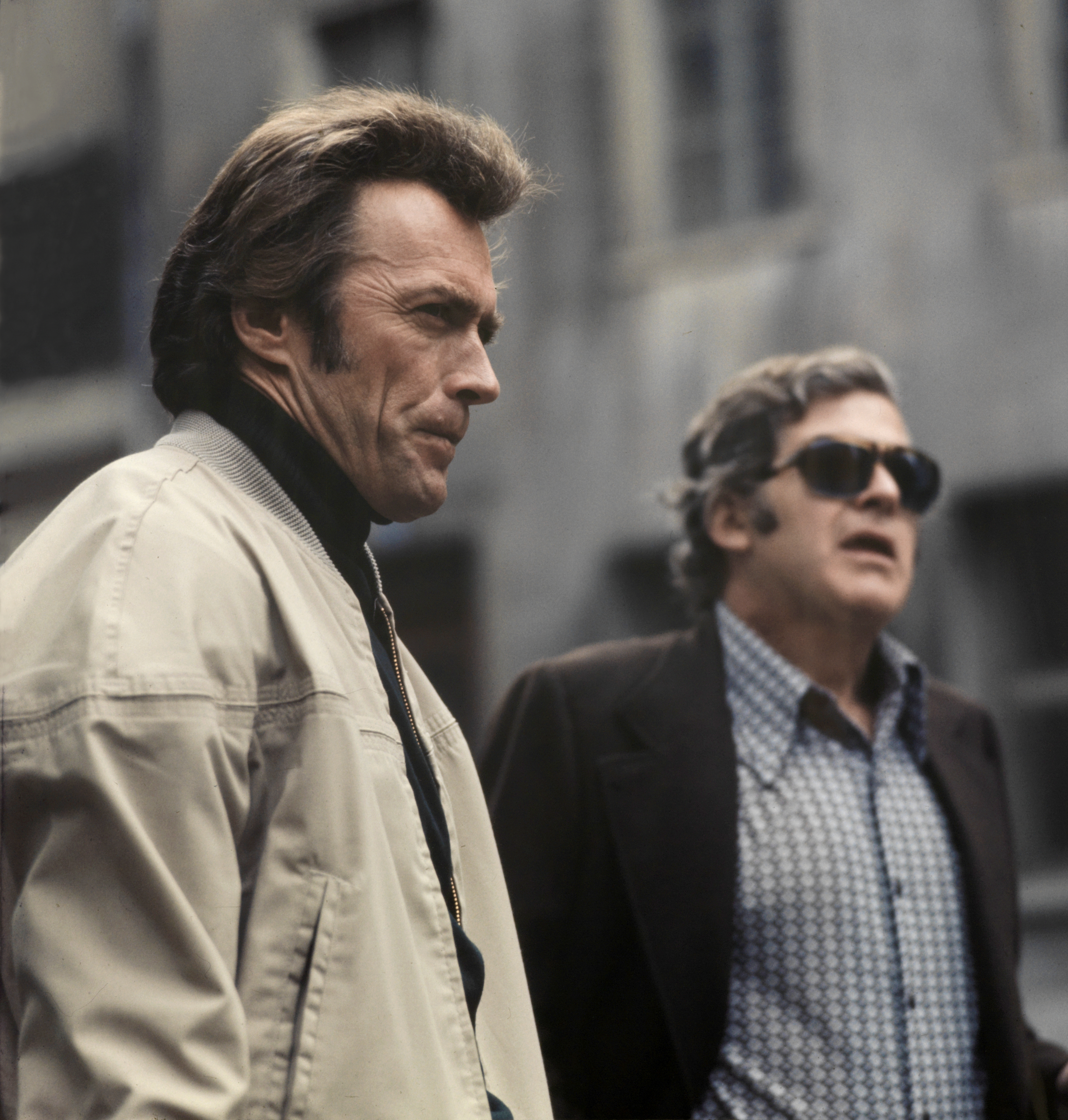
With an unidentified colleague at a film shoot for The Eiger Sanction, 1974

Eastwood's next film The Eiger Sanction (1975) was based on Trevanian's critically acclaimed spy novel of the same name. Eastwood plays Jonathan Hemlock in a role originally intended for Paul Newman, an assassin turned college art professor who decides to return to his former profession for one last "sanction" in return for a rare Pissarro painting. In the process he must climb the north face of the Eiger in Switzerland under perilous conditions. Mike Hoover taught Eastwood how to climb during several weeks of preparation at Yosemite before filming commenced in Grindelwald, Switzerland. Despite prior warnings about the perils of the Eiger, Eastwood insisted on doing all his own climbing and stunts. The film crew suffered a number of accidents, including one fatality. Eastwood cast former Bond girl Claudine Auger as his love interest, but deleted her entire performance from the movie. Upon release in May 1975, The Eiger Sanction was marginally successful commercially, receiving $14.2 million at the box-office, and gained mixed reviews. Joy Gould Boyum of The Wall Street Journal dismissed the film as "brutal fantasy". Eastwood blamed Universal Studios for the film's poor promotion and turned his back on them to make an agreement with Warner Bros., through Frank Wells, that has lasted to the present day.

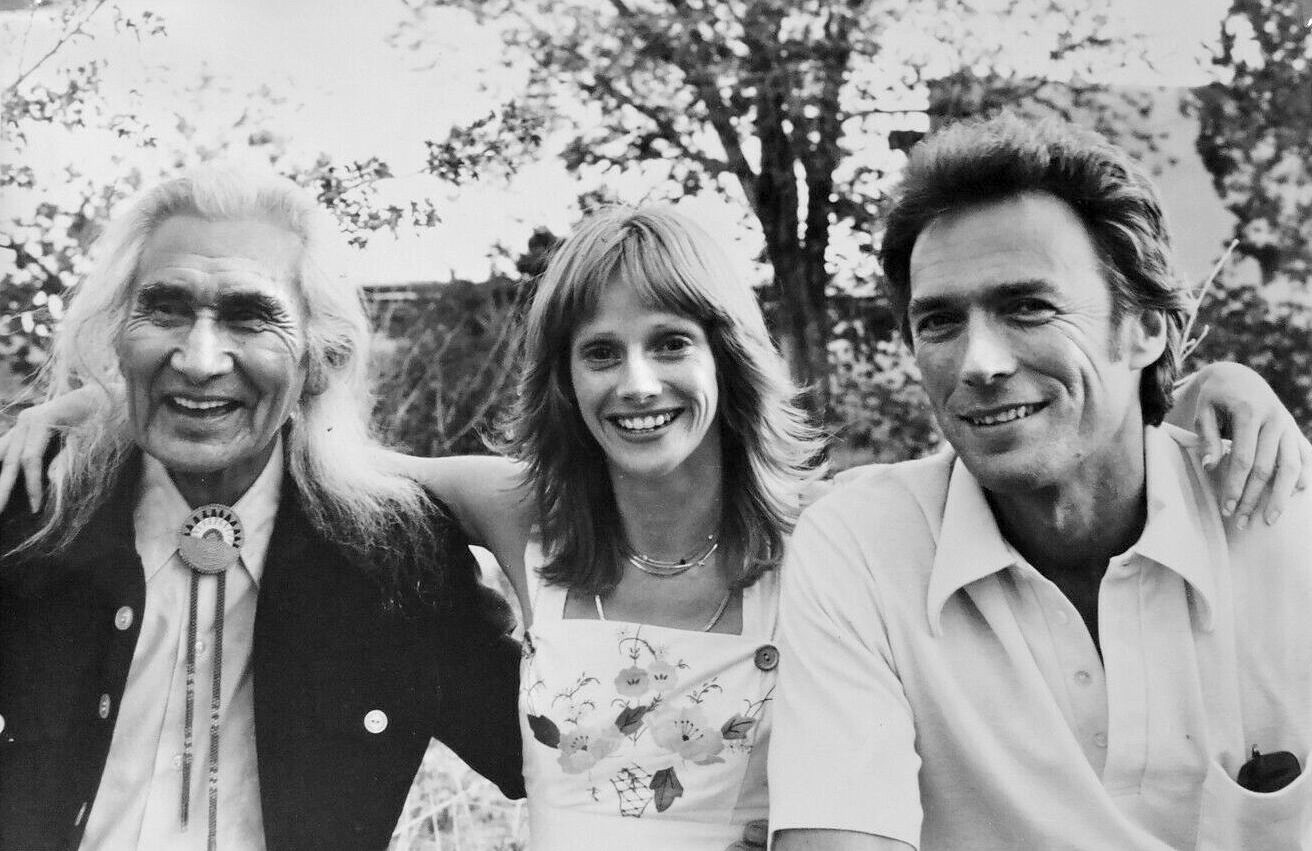
Chief Dan George with Locke and Eastwood at a barbecue in Santa Fe, New Mexico, promoting The Outlaw Josey Wales (1976)

The Outlaw Josey Wales (1976), a western inspired by Asa Carter's 1972 novel of the same name, has lead character Josey Wales (Eastwood) as a pro-Confederate guerrilla who refuses to surrender his arms after the American Civil War and is chased across the old southwest by a group of enforcers. The supporting cast included Locke as his love interest and Chief Dan George as an elderly Cherokee who strikes up a friendship with Wales. Director Philip Kaufman was fired by producer Bob Daley at Eastwood's command in October 1975, three weeks into the shoot, resulting in a fine reported to be around $60,000 from the Directors Guild of America – who subsequently passed new legislation reserving the right to impose a major fine on a producer for discharging and replacing a director. The film was pre-screened at the Sun Valley Center for the Arts and Humanities in Idaho during a six-day conference entitled Western Movies: Myths and Images. Invited to the screening were a number of well-known film critics, including Jay Cocks and Arthur Knight; directors such as King Vidor, William Wyler, and Howard Hawks; and a number of academics. Upon its release in the summer of 1976, The Outlaw Josey Wales was widely acclaimed, with many critics and viewers seeing Eastwood's role as an iconic one that related to America's ancestral past and the destiny of the nation after the American Civil War. Roger Ebert compared the nature and vulnerability of Eastwood's portrayal of Josey Wales with his Man with No Name character in the Dollars westerns, and praised the film's atmosphere. The film would later appear in Time's "Top 10 Films of the Year".

Eastwood was then offered the role of Benjamin L. Willard in Francis Coppola's Apocalypse Now, but declined, for he did not wish to spend weeks on location in the Philippines. He also refused the part of a platoon leader in Ted Post's Vietnam War film Go Tell the Spartans, and instead decided to make a third Dirty Harry film, The Enforcer (1976). The film had Callahan partnered with a new female officer (Tyne Daly) to face a San Francisco Bay area group resembling the Symbionese Liberation Army. The film, culminating in a shootout on Alcatraz island, was considerably shorter than the previous Dirty Harry films at 95 minutes, but was a major commercial success grossing $100 million worldwide to become Eastwood's highest-grossing film to date.

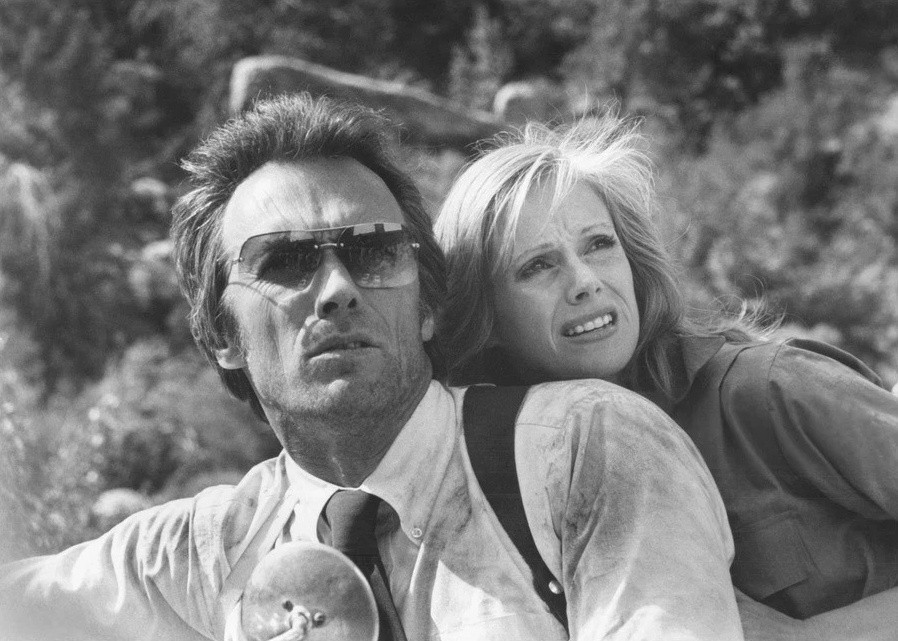
Eastwood and Locke in The Gauntlet (1977)

Eastwood directed and starred in The Gauntlet (1977) opposite Locke, Pat Hingle, William Prince, Bill McKinney, and Mara Corday. In this film, he portrays a down-and-out cop assigned to escort a prostitute from Las Vegas to Phoenix to testify against the mob. Although a moderate hit with the viewing public, critics had mixed feelings about the film, with many believing it was overly violent. Ebert, in contrast, gave the film three stars and called it "classic Clint Eastwood: fast, furious, and funny". In Every Which Way but Loose (1978), he had an uncharacteristic offbeat comedy role. His character, Philo Beddoe, is a trucker and brawler who roams the American West searching for a lost love (Locke) accompanied by his best friend, Orville Boggs (played by Geoffrey Lewis) and an orangutan called Clyde. The film proved surprisingly successful upon its release and became Eastwood's most commercially successful film up to that time. Panned by critics, it ranked high among the box-office successes of his career and was the second-highest-grossing film of 1978.

Eastwood starred in Escape from Alcatraz (1979), the last of his films directed by Siegel. It was based on the true story of Frank Lee Morris who, along with John and Clarence Anglin, escaped from the notorious Alcatraz Federal Penitentiary in 1962. The film was a major success; Stanley Kauffmann of The New Republic praised it as "crystalline cinema" and Frank Rich of Time described it as "cool, cinematic grace".

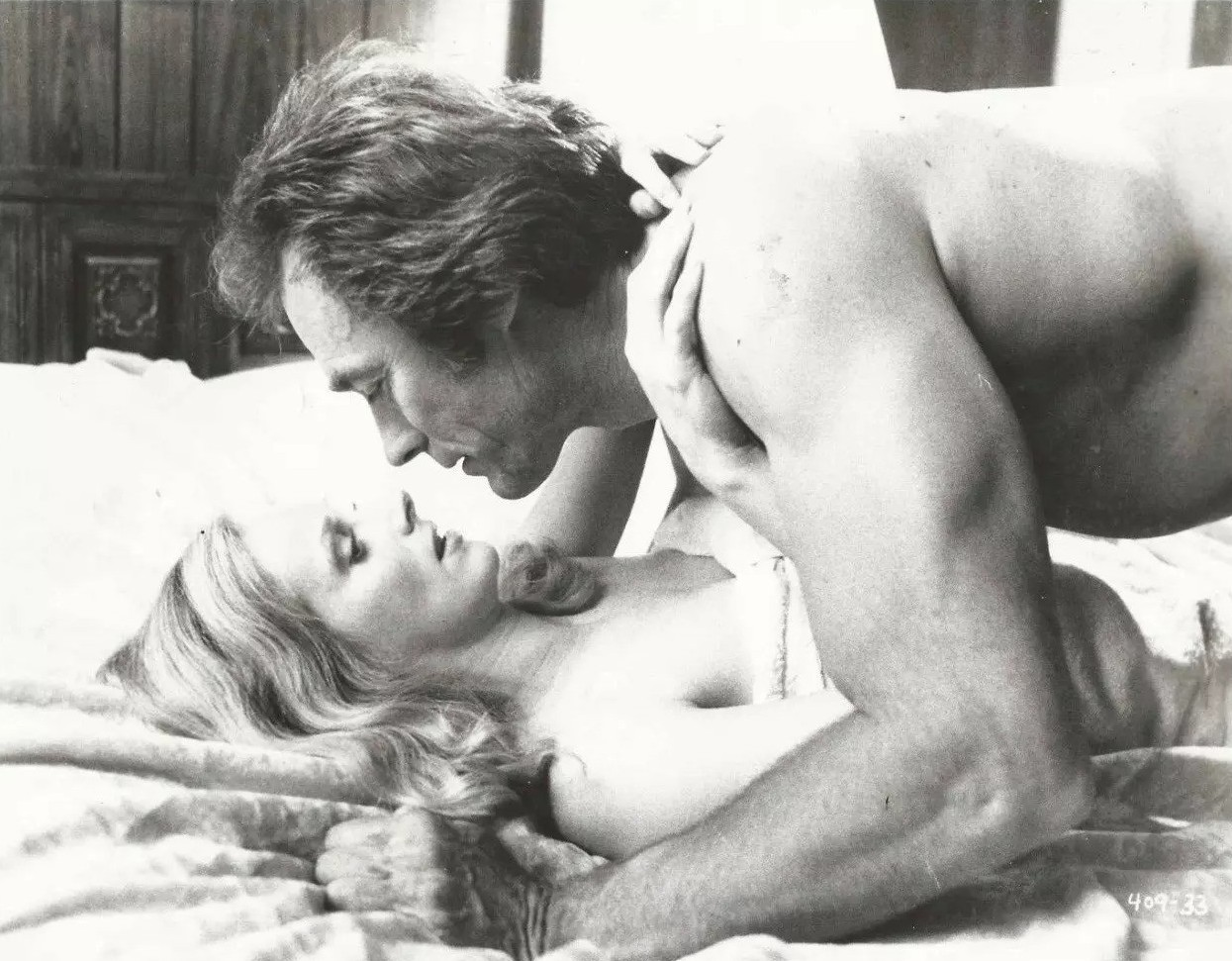
With Locke in Any Which Way You Can (1980)

Eastwood directed and enacted the title role in Bronco Billy (1980), alongside Locke, Scatman Crothers, and Sam Bottoms. Filming commenced on October 1, 1979, in the Boise metropolitan area and was shot in five and a half weeks on a budget of $5 million. Cinematographer David Worth stated, "Being able to capture the true love between Clint and Sondra was very special." Eastwood has cited Bronco Billy as being one of the most relaxed shoots of his career and biographer Richard Schickel argued that Bronco Billy is Eastwood's most self-referential character. The film was a commercial disappointment, but was liked by critics. Janet Maslin of The New York Times wrote that film was "the best and funniest Clint Eastwood movie in quite a while", and praised Eastwood's directing, intricately juxtaposing the old West and the new West. Released later in 1980, Any Which Way You Can was the sequel to Every Which Way but Loose and also starring Eastwood. The film received a number of bad reviews from critics, although Maslin described it as "funnier and even better than its predecessor". In theaters over the Christmas season, Any Which Way You Can was a major box office success and ranked among the year's top five highest-grossing films.

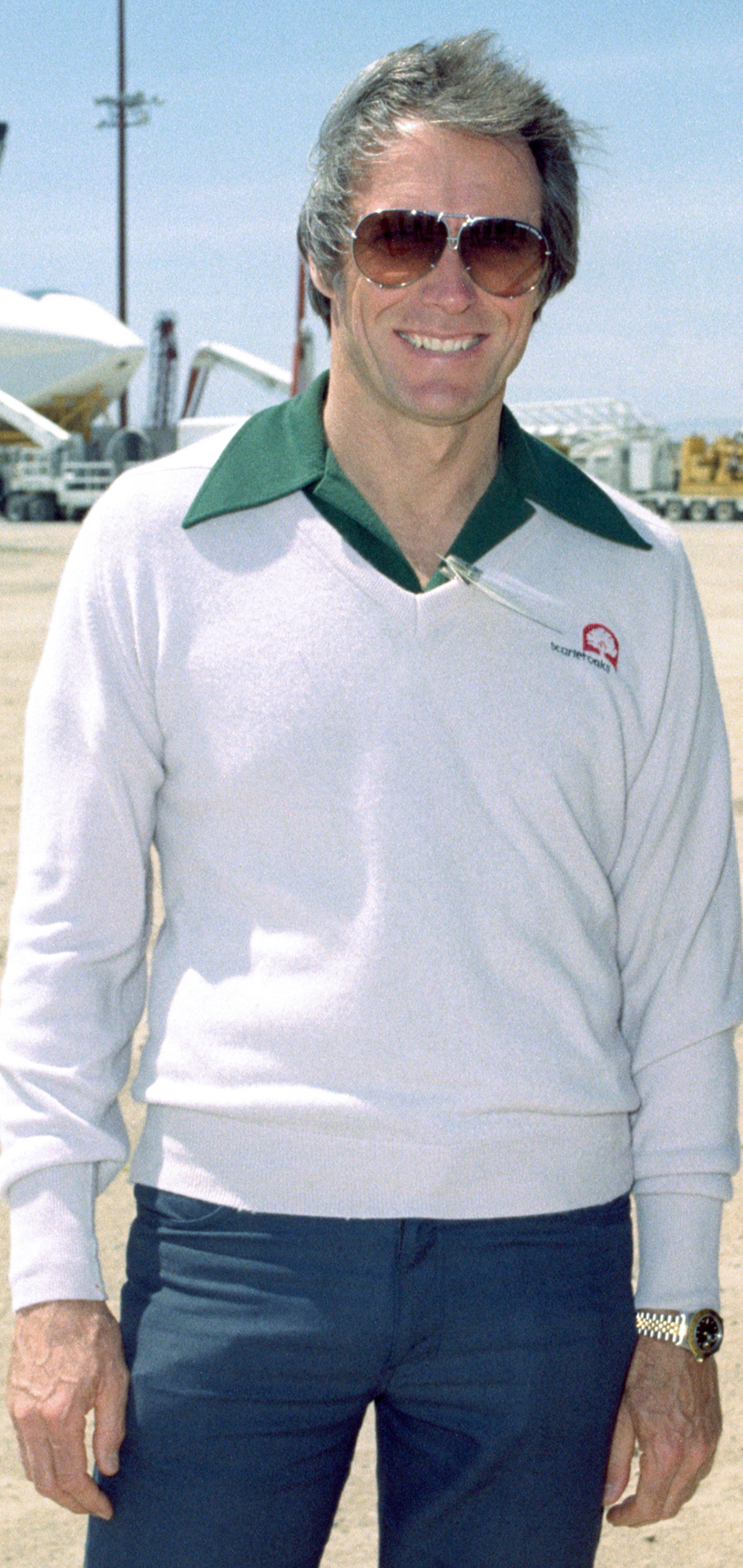
Eastwood in 1981

Eastwood directed and starred in Honkytonk Man (1982), based on the eponymous Clancy Carlile's depression-era novel. Eastwood portrays a struggling western singer Red Stovall who suffers from tuberculosis, but has finally been given an opportunity to make it big at the Grand Ole Opry. He is accompanied by his young nephew (played by real-life son Kyle) to Nashville, Tennessee, where he is supposed to record a song. Only Time gave the film a good review in the United States, with most reviewers criticizing its blend of muted humor and tragedy. Nevertheless, the film received a more positive reception in France, where it was compared to John Ford's The Grapes of Wrath, and it has since acquired the very high rating of 93 percent on Rotten Tomatoes. Around the same time, Eastwood directed, produced, and starred in the Cold War-themed Firefox (also 1982). Based on a 1977 novel with the same name written by Craig Thomas, the film was shot before but released after Honkytonk Man. Russian filming locations were not possible due to the Cold War, and the film had to be shot in Vienna and other locations in Austria to simulate many of the Eurasian story locations. With a production cost of $20 million, it was Eastwood's highest budget film to that time. People likened Eastwood's performance to "Luke Skywalker trapped in Dirty Harry's Soul".

Eastwood directed and starred in the fourth Dirty Harry film, Sudden Impact (1983), which is considered the darkest and most violent of the series. By this time, Eastwood received 60 percent of all profits from films he starred in and directed, with the rest going to the studio. Sudden Impact was his final on-screen collaboration with Locke. She plays a middle-aged painter who, along with her sister, was gang-raped years before the story takes place and seeks revenge for her sister's now-vegetative state by systematically murdering the rapists. The line "Go ahead, make my day" (uttered by Eastwood during an early scene in a coffee shop) has been cited as one of cinema's immortal lines. It was quoted by President Ronald Reagan in a speech to Congress, and used during the 1984 presidential elections. The film was the second–most commercially successful of the Dirty Harry films (after The Enforcer), earning $70 million. It received very positive reviews, with many critics praising the feminist aspects of the film through its explorations of the physical and psychological consequences of rape.

Tightrope (1984) had Eastwood starring opposite Geneviève Bujold in a provocative thriller, inspired by newspaper articles about an elusive Bay Area rapist. Set in New Orleans to avoid confusion with the Dirty Harry films, Eastwood played a divorced cop drawn into his target's tortured psychology and fascination for sadomasochism. Tightrope was a critical and commercial hit and became the fourth highest-grossing R-rated film of 1984. Eastwood next starred in the crime comedy City Heat (also 1984) alongside Burt Reynolds, a film about an ex-cop turned private eye and his former police lieutenant partner who get mixed up with gangsters in the Prohibition era of the 1930s. The film grossed around $50 million domestically, but was overshadowed by Eddie Murphy's Beverly Hills Cop.

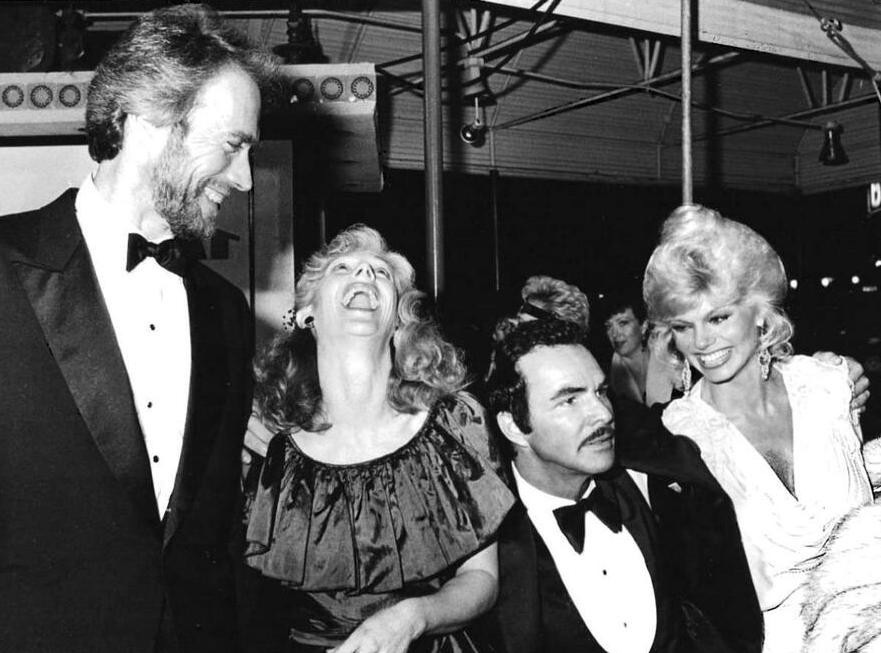
Eastwood and Locke at the premiere of City Heat (1984) with Burt Reynolds and Loni Anderson

Westerns. A period gone by, the pioneer, the loner operating by himself, without benefit of society. It usually has something to do with some sort of vengeance; he takes care of the vengeance himself, doesn't call the police. Like Robin Hood. It's the last masculine frontier. Romantic myth, I guess, though it's hard to think about anything romantic today. In a Western you can think, Jesus, there was a time when man was alone, on horseback, out there where man hasn't spoiled the land yet.

— Eastwood, on the philosophical allure of portraying western loners

Eastwood made his only foray into TV direction with the Amazing Stories episode "Vanessa in the Garden" (1985), which starred Harvey Keitel and Locke as a married couple. This was his first collaboration with Steven Spielberg, who later co-produced Flags of Our Fathers and Letters from Iwo Jima. He would revisit the Western genre when he directed and starred in Pale Rider (1985), a film based on the classic western Shane (1953) and follows a preacher descending from the mists of the Sierras to side with the miners during the California Gold Rush of 1850. The title is a reference to the Four Horsemen of the Apocalypse, as the rider of the pale horse is Death, and shows similarities to Eastwood's western High Plains Drifter (1973) in its themes of morality and justice as well as its exploration of the supernatural. It was hailed as one of the best films of 1985 and the best western to appear for a considerable period, with Gene Siskel of the Chicago Tribune remarking, "This year (1985) will go down in film history as the moment Clint Eastwood finally earned respect as an artist."

Eastwood co-starred with Marsha Mason in the military drama Heartbreak Ridge (1986), about the 1983 United States invasion of Grenada. He portrayed a United States Marine Corps Gunnery Sergeant veteran of the Vietnam War who realizes he is nearing the end of his military service. Production and filming were marred by internal disagreements between Eastwood and long-time friend and producer Fritz Manes, as well as between Eastwood and the United States Department of Defense, which had expressed contempt for the film. At the time, the film was a commercial rather than a critical success, and has only come to be viewed more favorably in recent times. The film grossed $70 million domestically.

Eastwood starred in The Dead Pool (1988), the fifth and final film in the Dirty Harry series. It co-starred Patricia Clarkson, Liam Neeson, and a young Jim Carrey who plays Johnny Squares, a drug-addled rock star and the first of the victims on a list of celebrities drawn up by horror film director Peter Swan (Neeson) who are deemed most likely to die, the so-called "Dead Pool". The list is stolen by an obsessed fan who, in mimicking his favorite director, makes his way through the list killing off celebrities, of which Dirty Harry is also included. The Dead Pool grossed nearly $38 million, relatively low receipts for a Dirty Harry film. It is generally viewed as the weakest film of the series, though Roger Ebert thought it was as good as the original.

Eastwood began working on smaller, more personal projects and experienced a lull in his career between 1988 and 1992. Always interested in jazz, he directed Bird (1988), a biopic starring Forest Whitaker as jazz musician Charlie "Bird" Parker. Alto saxophonist Jackie McLean and Spike Lee, son of jazz bassist Bill Lee and a long time critic of Eastwood, criticized the characterization of Charlie Parker remarking that it did not capture his true essence and sense of humor. Eastwood received two Golden Globes for the film, the Cecil B. DeMille Award for his lifelong contribution, and the Best Director award. However, Bird was a commercial failure, earning just $11 million, which Eastwood attributed to the declining interest in jazz among black people. Carrey would appear with Eastwood again in the poorly-received comedy Pink Cadillac (1989). The film is about a bounty hunter and a group of white supremacists chasing an innocent woman (Bernadette Peters) who tries to outrun everyone in her husband's prized pink Cadillac. The film failed both critically and commercially, earning barely more than Bird and marking a low point in Eastwood's career.

=== 1990–2009: Critical acclaim and awards success ===
Eastwood directed and starred in White Hunter Black Heart (1990), an adaptation of Peter Viertel's roman à clef, about John Huston and the making of the classic film The African Queen. Shot on location in Zimbabwe in the summer of 1989, the film received some critical attention but with only a limited release earned just $8.4 million. Eastwood directed and co-starred with Charlie Sheen in The Rookie, a buddy cop action film released in December 1990. Critics found the film's plot and characterization unconvincing, but praised its action sequences. An ongoing lawsuit, in response to Eastwood allegedly ramming a woman's car, resulted in no Eastwood films being shown in cinemas in 1991. Eastwood won the suit and agreed to pay the complainant's legal fees if she did not appeal.

[I]f possible, he looks even taller, leaner and more mysteriously possessed than he did in Sergio Leone's seminal Fistful of Dollars a quarter of a century ago. The years haven't softened him. They have given him the presence of some fierce force of nature, which may be why the landscapes of the mythic, late 19th-century West become him, never more so than in his new Unforgiven. ... This is his richest, most satisfying performance since the underrated, politically lunatic Heartbreak Ridge. There's no one like him.

— Vincent Canby of The New York Times, on Eastwood's performance in Unforgiven

Eastwood revisited the western genre in Unforgiven (1992), a film which he directed and starred in as an aging ex-gunfighter long past his prime. Scripts existed for the film as early as 1976 under titles such as The Cut-Whore Killings and The William Munny Killings, but Eastwood delayed the project because he wanted to wait until he was old enough to play his character and to savor it as the last of his western films. Unforgiven was a major commercial and critical success; Jack Methews of the Los Angeles Times described it as "the finest classical western to come along since perhaps John Ford's 1956 The Searchers". The film was nominated for nine Academy Awards (including Best Actor for Eastwood and Best Original Screenplay for David Webb Peoples), and won four, including Best Picture and Best Director for Eastwood. In 2008 Unforgiven was ranked as the fourth-best American western, behind Shane, High Noon, and The Searchers in the American Film Institute's "AFI's 10 Top 10" list.

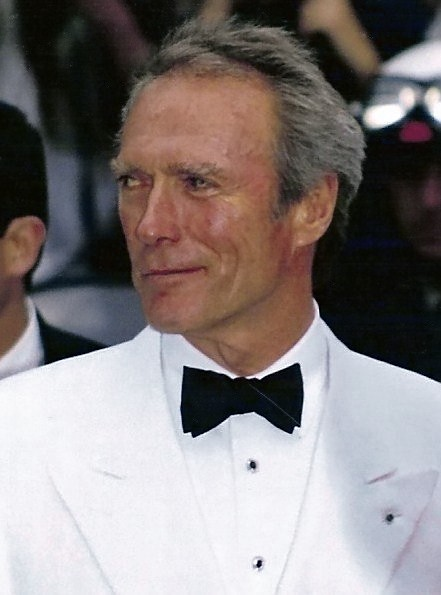
Eastwood at the 1994 Cannes Film Festival

Eastwood played Frank Horrigan in the Secret Service thriller In the Line of Fire (1993), directed by Wolfgang Petersen and co-starring John Malkovich and Rene Russo. Horrigan is a guilt-ridden Secret Service agent haunted by his failure to save John F. Kennedy's life. The film was among the top 10 box office performers in that year, earning $102 million in the United States alone, and 25 years after he was first listed on Quigley's Top Ten Money Making Stars Poll, Eastwood was voted number one again. A few months after film wrapped, Eastwood directed and co-starred alongside Kevin Costner in A Perfect World (also 1993). Set in the 1960s, Eastwood plays a Texas Ranger in pursuit of an escaped convict (Costner) who hits the road with a young boy (T.J. Lowther). Janet Maslin of The New York Times wrote that the film marked the highest point of Eastwood's directing career, and the film has since been cited as one of his most underrated directorial achievements.

At the 1994 Cannes Film Festival Eastwood received France's Ordre des Arts et des Lettres medal, and in 1995, he was awarded the Irving G. Thalberg Memorial Award at the 67th Academy Awards. His next film appearance was in a cameo role as himself in the children's film Casper (1995). He expanded his repertoire by playing opposite Meryl Streep in The Bridges of Madison County (also 1995). Based on the novel by Robert James Waller, the film relates the story of Robert Kincaid (Eastwood), a photographer working for National Geographic who, while photographing historic covered bridges in Iowa, meets and has an affair with an Italian-born farm wife, Francesca (Streep). Despite the novel receiving unfavorable reviews, The Bridges of Madison County film was a commercial and critical success. Roger Ebert wrote, "Streep and Eastwood weave a spell, and it is based on that particular knowledge of love and self that comes with middle age." The film was nominated for a Golden Globe for Best Motion Picture – Drama and won a César Award in France for Best Foreign Film. Streep was also nominated for an Academy Award and a Golden Globe.

Eastwood directed and starred in the political thriller Absolute Power (1997), alongside Gene Hackman (with whom he had appeared in Unforgiven). Eastwood played the role of a veteran thief who witnesses the Secret Service cover-up of a murder. The film received a mixed reception from critics. Later in 1997, Eastwood directed Midnight in the Garden of Good and Evil, based on the novel by John Berendt and starring John Cusack, Kevin Spacey, and Jude Law. The film met with a mixed critical response.

The roles that Eastwood has played, and the films that he has directed, cannot be disentangled from the nature of the American culture of the last quarter century, its fantasies and its realities.

— Author Edward Gallafent, commenting on Eastwood's impact on film from the 1970s to 1990s

Eastwood directed and starred in True Crime (1999). He plays Steve Everett, a journalist and recovering alcoholic, who has to cover the execution of murderer Frank Beechum (played by Isaiah Washington). True Crime received a mixed reception, with Janet Maslin of The New York Times writing, "his direction is galvanized by a sense of second chances and tragic misunderstandings, and by contrasting a larger sense of justice with the peculiar minutiae of crime. Perhaps he goes a shade too far in the latter direction, though." The film was a box office failure, earning less than half its $55 million budget and was Eastwood's worst-performing film of the 1990s aside from White Hunter Black Heart, which had a limited release.

Eastwood directed and starred in Space Cowboys (2000) alongside Tommy Lee Jones, Donald Sutherland and James Garner. Eastwood played one of a group of veteran ex-test pilots sent into space to repair an old Soviet satellite. The original music score was composed by Eastwood and Lennie Niehaus. Space Cowboys was critically well-received and holds a 79 percent rating at Rotten Tomatoes, although Roger Ebert wrote that the film was, "too secure within its traditional story structure to make much seem at risk". The film grossed more than $90 million in its United States release, more than Eastwood's two previous films combined. Eastwood played an ex-FBI agent chasing a sadistic killer (Jeff Daniels) in the thriller Blood Work (2002), loosely based on the 1998 novel of the same name by Michael Connelly. The film was a commercial failure, grossing just $26.2 million on an estimated budget of $50 million and received mixed reviews, with Rotten Tomatoes describing it as, "well-made but marred by lethargic pacing".

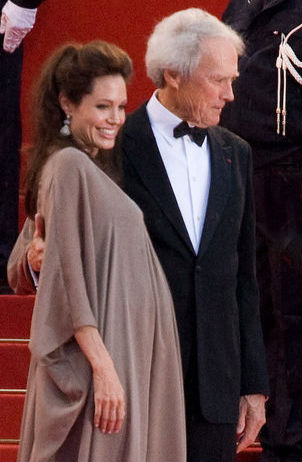
With a pregnant Angelina Jolie on the red carpet of the 2008 Cannes Film Festival

Eastwood directed and scored the crime drama Mystic River (2003), a film dealing with themes of murder, vigilantism and sexual abuse and starring Sean Penn, Kevin Bacon, and Tim Robbins. The film was praised by critics and won two Academy Awards – Best Actor for Penn and Best Supporting Actor for Robbins – with Eastwood garnering nominations for Best Director and Best Picture. The film grossed $90 million domestically on a budget of $30 million. In 2003, Eastwood was named Best Director of the Year by the National Society of Film Critics.

Clint is a true artist in every respect. Despite his years of being at the top of his game and the legendary movies he has made, he always made us feel comfortable and valued on the set, treating us as equals.

— Tim Robbins, on working with Eastwood.

The following year, Eastwood found further critical acclaim with Million Dollar Baby. The boxing drama won four Academy Awards for Best Picture, Best Director, Best Actress (Hilary Swank) and Best Supporting Actor (Morgan Freeman). At age 74, Eastwood became the oldest of eighteen directors to have directed two or more Best Picture winners. He also received a nomination for Best Actor, as well as a Grammy nomination for his score, and won a Golden Globe for Best Director, which was presented to him by daughter Kathryn, who was Miss Golden Globe at the 2005 ceremony. A. O. Scott of The New York Times lauded the film as a "masterpiece" and the best film of the year.

Eastwood directed two films about World War II's Battle of Iwo Jima released in 2006. The first, Flags of Our Fathers, focused on the men who raised the American flag on top of Mount Suribachi and featured the film debut of Eastwood's son Scott. This was followed by Letters from Iwo Jima, which dealt with the tactics of the Japanese soldiers on the island and the letters they wrote home to family members. Letters from Iwo Jima was the first American film to depict a war issue completely from the view of an American enemy. Both films received praise from critics and garnered several nominations at the 79th Academy Awards, including Best Director, Best Picture, and Best Original Screenplay for Letters from Iwo Jima. At the 64th Golden Globe Awards Eastwood received nominations for Best Director in both films. Letters from Iwo Jima won the award for Best Foreign Language Film.

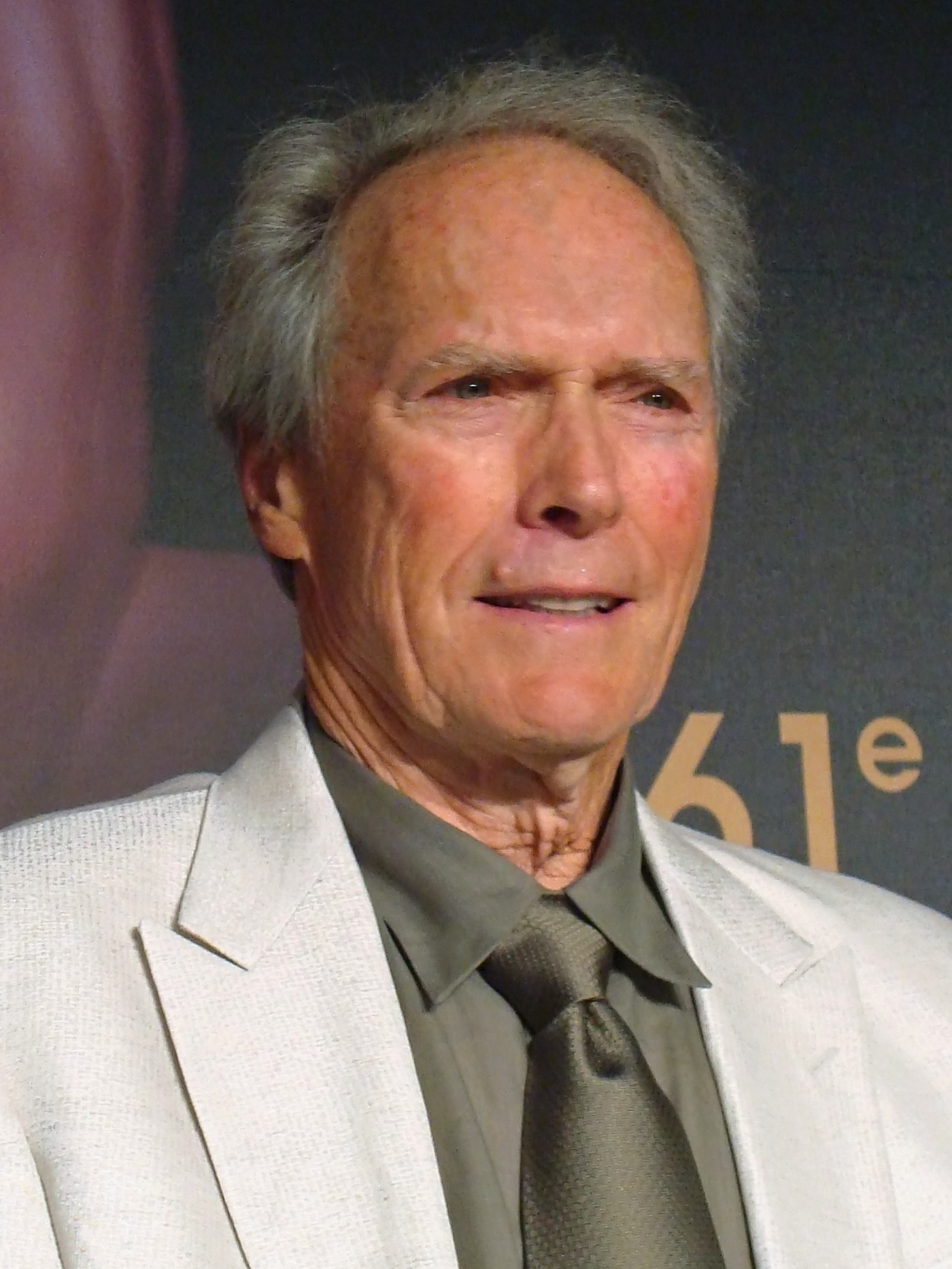
Eastwood in 2008

Eastwood next directed Changeling (2008), based on a true story set in the late 1920s. Angelina Jolie stars as a woman reunited with her missing son only to realize he is an impostor. After its release at several film festivals the film grossed over $110 million, the majority of which came from foreign markets. The film was highly acclaimed, with Damon Wise of Empire describing Changeling as "flawless". Todd McCarthy of Variety described it as "emotionally powerful and stylistically sure-handed" and that the film's characters and social commentary were brought into the story with an "almost breathtaking deliberation". For the film, Eastwood received nominations for Best Original Score at the 66th Golden Globe Awards, Best Direction at the 62nd British Academy Film Awards and director of the year from the London Film Critics' Circle.

Eastwood ended a four-year "self-imposed acting hiatus" by appearing in Gran Torino (also 2008), which he also directed, produced and partly scored with his son Kyle and Jamie Cullum. Biographer Marc Eliot called Eastwood's role "an amalgam of the Man with No Name, Dirty Harry, and William Munny, here aged and cynical but willing and able to fight on whenever the need arose". Gran Torino grossed almost $30 million during its opening weekend release in January 2009, the highest of his career as an actor or director. Gran Torino eventually grossed over $268 million in theaters worldwide, becoming the highest-grossing film of Eastwood's career so far (without adjustment for inflation).

Eastwood's 30th directorial outing came with Invictus (2009), a film based on the story of the South African team at the 1995 Rugby World Cup with Morgan Freeman as Nelson Mandela, Matt Damon as rugby team captain François Pienaar, and Grant L. Roberts as Ruben Kruger. The film was met with generally positive reviews; Roger Ebert gave it three and a half stars and described it as a "very good film ... with moments evoking great emotion", while Variety's Todd McCarthy wrote, "Inspirational on the face of it, Clint Eastwood's film has a predictable trajectory, but every scene brims with surprising details that accumulate into a rich fabric of history, cultural impressions and emotion." For the film, Eastwood was nominated for Best Director at the 67th Golden Globe Awards.

=== 2010–2026: Directorial focus, later roles, and retirement ===
In the Eastwood-directed Hereafter (2010), he again worked with Matt Damon, who portrayed a psychic. The film had its world premiere at the Toronto International Film Festival and was given a limited theatrical release. Hereafter received mixed reviews from critics, with the consensus at Rotten Tomatoes being, "Despite a thought-provoking premise and Clint Eastwood's typical flair as director, Hereafter fails to generate much compelling drama, straddling the line between poignant sentimentality and hokey tedium." Around the same time, Eastwood served as executive producer for a TCM documentary about jazz pianist Dave Brubeck, Dave Brubeck: In His Own Sweet Way (also 2010), to commemorate Brubeck's 90th birthday.

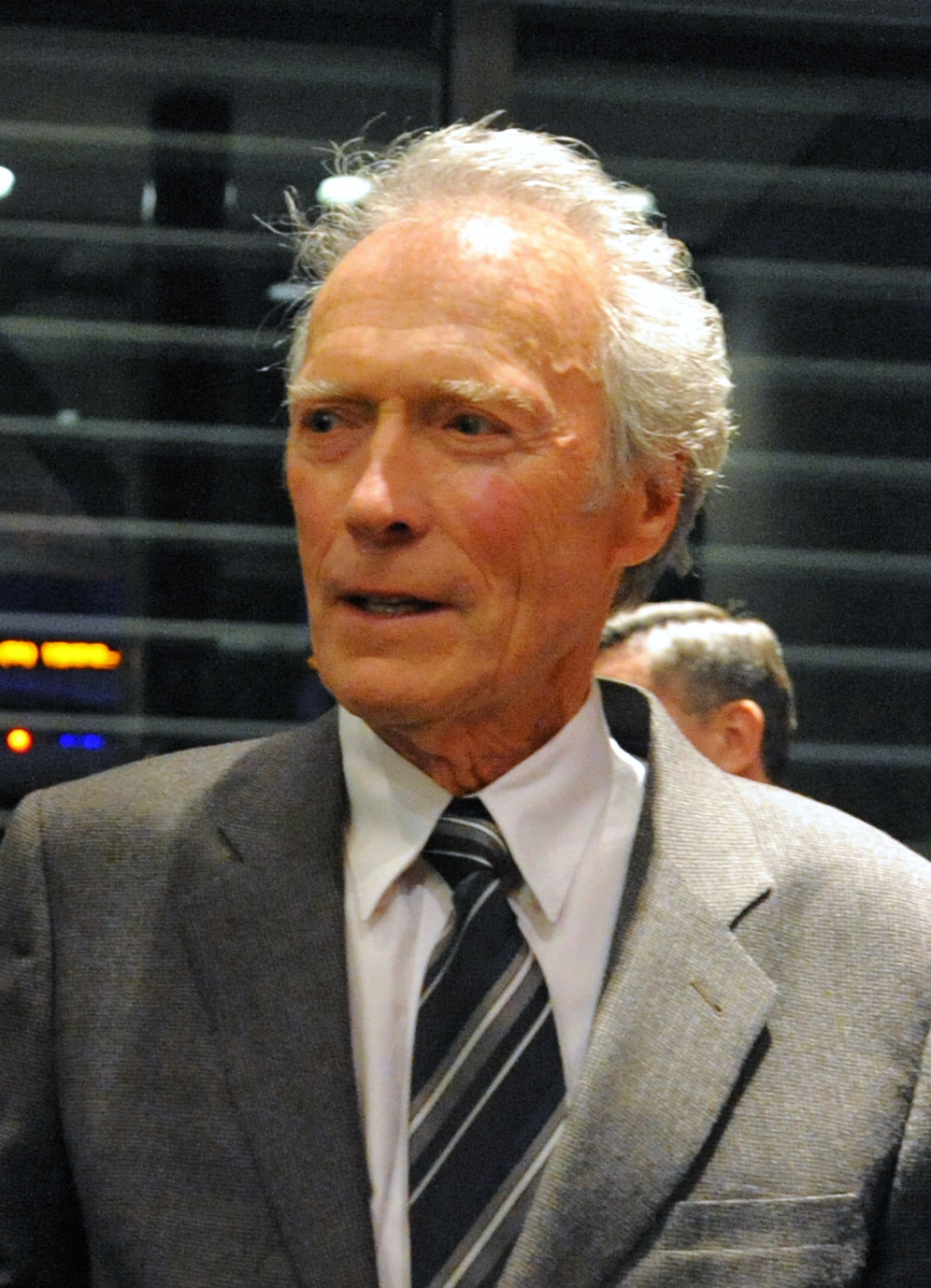
Eastwood at the Washington, D.C. premiere of J. Edgar (2011)

Eastwood directed J. Edgar (2011), a biopic of FBI director J. Edgar Hoover, with Leonardo DiCaprio in the title role. The film received mixed reviews, although DiCaprio's performance as Hoover was widely praised. Roger Ebert wrote that the film is "fascinating", "masterful", and praised DiCaprio's performance. David Edelstein of New York magazine, while also praising DiCaprio, wrote, "It's too bad J. Edgar is so shapeless and turgid and ham-handed, so rich in bad lines and worse readings." Eastwood starred in the baseball drama Trouble with the Curve (2012), as a veteran baseball scout who travels with his daughter for a final scouting trip. Robert Lorenz, who worked with Eastwood as an assistant director on several films, directed the film.

Everybody wonders why I continue working at this stage. I keep working because there's always new stories. ... And as long as people want me to tell them, I'll be there doing them.

— Eastwood, reflecting on his later career

During Super Bowl XLVI, Eastwood narrated a halftime advertisement for Chrysler titled "Halftime in America" (2012). The advertisement was criticized by several U.S. Republicans, who claimed it implied that President Barack Obama deserved a second term. In response to the criticism, Eastwood stated, "I am certainly not politically affiliated with Mr. Obama. It was meant to be a message about job growth and the spirit of America."

Eastwood next directed Jersey Boys (2014), a musical biopic based on the Tony Award-winning musical of the same name. The film told the story of the musical group The Four Seasons. Eastwood directed American Sniper (also 2014), a film adaptation of Chris Kyle's eponymous memoir, following Steven Spielberg's departure from the project. Released on Christmas Day, American Sniper grossed more than $350 million domestically and over $547 million globally, making it one of Eastwood's biggest movies commercially.

His next film, Sully (2016), starred Tom Hanks as Chesley Sullenberger, who successfully landed the US Airways Flight 1549 on the Hudson River in an emergency landing, keeping all passengers on board alive. It became another commercial success for Eastwood, grossing over $238 million worldwide. He directed the biographical thriller The 15:17 to Paris (2018), which saw previously non-professional actors Spencer Stone, Anthony Sadler, and Alek Skarlatos playing themselves as they stop the 2015 Thalys train attack. The film received a generally negative reception from critics, who were largely critical of the acting by the three leads.

Eastwood next starred in and directed The Mule, which was released in December 2018. He played Earl Stone, an elderly drug smuggler based on Leo Sharp, Eastwood's first acting role since Trouble with the Curve in 2012. On the eve of The Mule's opening, news belatedly surfaced that Eastwood's ex-significant other Sondra Locke had died over a month earlier on November 3; no explanation was given for the media blackout. Given Locke's extensive history of deceiving the public, scholars deduced that she must have requested the blackout in her final wishes, so as to prevent her true age from being broadcast to the world.

In May 2019, it was announced that Eastwood would direct The Ballad of Richard Jewell, based on the life of heroic security guard Richard Jewell, who was wrongly suspected in the 1996 Olympic bombing. Later retitled simply Richard Jewell, Eastwood directed and produced the film, through Warner Bros., his tenth straight film with the company. Jonah Hill and Leonardo DiCaprio were originally set to star in the film in 2014, when it was to be directed by Paul Greengrass, but DiCaprio and Hill would ultimately serve only as producers on Eastwood's film. The film stars Paul Walter Hauser in the titular role, along with Sam Rockwell, Kathy Bates, Jon Hamm, and Olivia Wilde in supporting roles. Filming began on June 24, 2019, and Richard Jewell was released on December 13, 2019.

In October 2020, it was announced that Eastwood would direct, produce, and star in Cry Macho, an adaptation of the 1975 novel of the same name, for Warner Bros. Pictures. Production of the film took place in New Mexico between November and December 2020. It was released on September 17, 2021, to mixed reviews and commercial failure.

In April 2023, reports emerged that Eastwood would direct and produce Juror #2, from a screenplay by Jonathan Abrams. The film stars Nicholas Hoult, Toni Collette, Zoey Deutch, Kiefer Sutherland, and J.K. Simmons. Production began in June 2023, but was temporarily suspended due to the 2023 SAG-AFTRA strike, resuming in November 2023. The film was distributed by Warner Bros. and released in November 2024, to generally favorable reviews. Although insiders initially denied rumors that Juror #2 may be Eastwood's final directorial effort, his son Kyle revealed in 2026 that he had retired.

== Directorial style ==
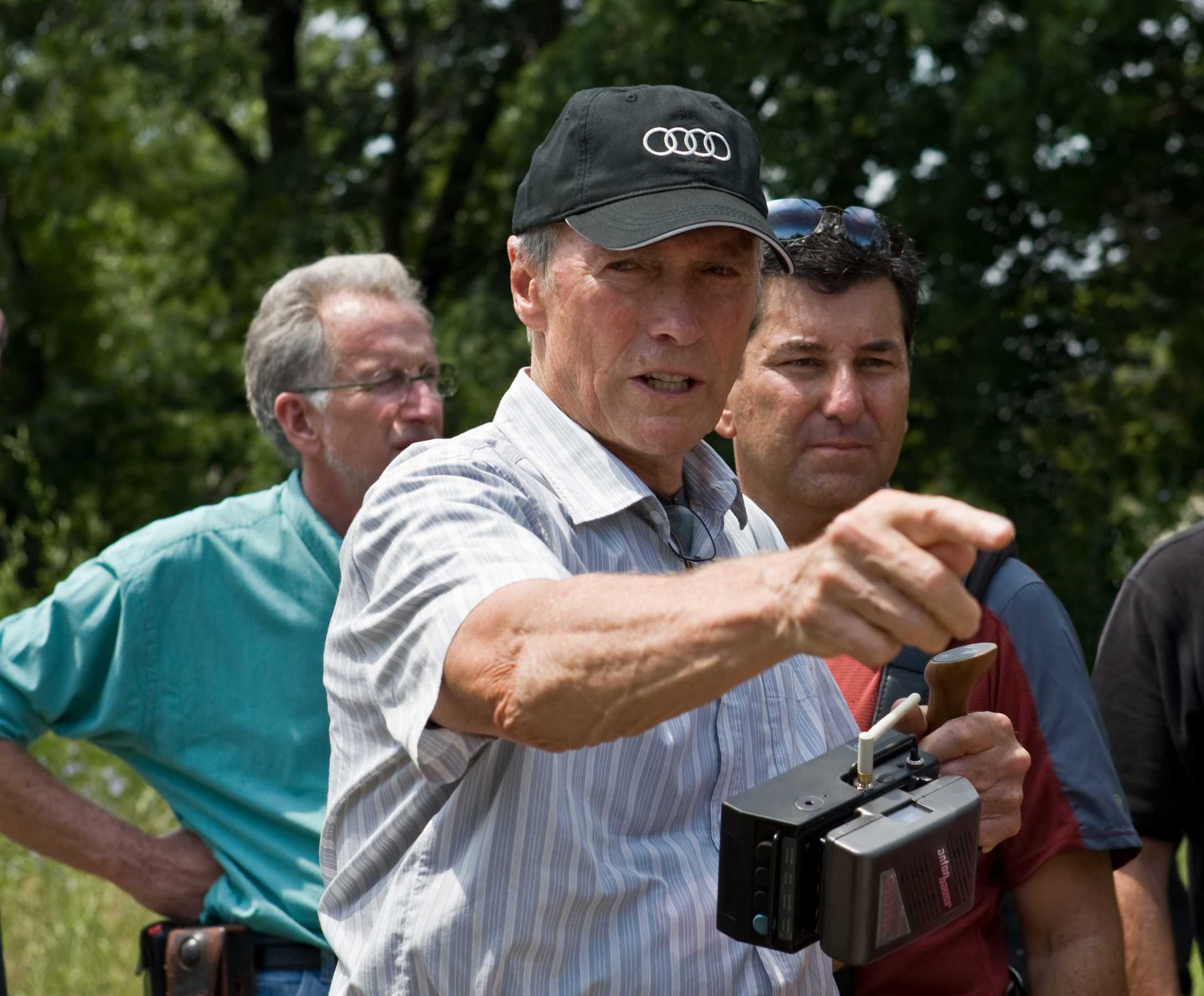
On the set of Gran Torino, 2008

Beginning with the thriller Play Misty for Me, Eastwood has directed over 30 films, including Westerns, action films, musicals and dramas. He is one of few top Hollywood actors to have also become a critically and commercially successful director. The New Yorker's David Denby wrote that, unlike Eastwood,

John Ford appeared in just a few silent films; Howard Hawks never acted in movies. Clark Gable, Gary Cooper, Spencer Tracy, James Stewart, Cary Grant, Humphrey Bogart, William Holden, Steve McQueen, and Sean Connery never directed a feature. John Wayne directed only twice, and badly; ditto Burt Lancaster. Paul Newman, Jack Nicholson, Warren Beatty, Robert Redford, Robert De Niro, and Sean Penn have directed a few movies each, with mixed commercial and artistic success.

From the very early days of his career, Eastwood was frustrated by directors' insistence that scenes be re-shot multiple times and perfected, and when he began directing in 1970, he made a conscious attempt to avoid any aspects of directing he had been indifferent to as an actor. As a result, Eastwood is renowned for his efficient film directing and ability to reduce filming time and control budgets. He usually avoids actors' rehearsing and prefers to complete most scenes on the first take. Eastwood's rapid filmmaking practices have been compared to those of Woody Allen, Ingmar Bergman, and Jean-Luc Godard.

When acting in others' films, he has sometimes taken over directing, such as for The Outlaw Josey Wales, if he believes production is too slow. In preparation for filming Eastwood rarely uses storyboards for developing the layout of a shooting schedule. He also attempts to reduce script background details on characters to allow the audience to become more involved in the film, considering their imagination a requirement for a film that connects with viewers. Eastwood has indicated that he lays out a film's plot to provide the audience with necessary details, but not "so much that it insults their intelligence".

According to Life magazine, "Eastwood's style is to shoot first and act afterward. He etches his characters virtually without words. He has developed the art of underplaying to the point that anyone around him who so much as flinches looks hammily histrionic." Interviewers Richard Thompson and Tim Hunter commented that Eastwood's films are "superbly paced: unhurried; cool; and [give] a strong sense of real time, regardless of the speed of the narrative", while Ric Gentry considers Eastwood's pacing "unrushed and relaxed". Eastwood is fond of low-key lighting and back-lighting to give his films a "noir-ish" feel.

Eastwood's frequent exploration of ethical values has drawn the attention of scholars, who have researched Eastwood's work from ethical and theological perspectives, including his portrayal of justice, mercy, suicide and the angel of death.

== Politics ==
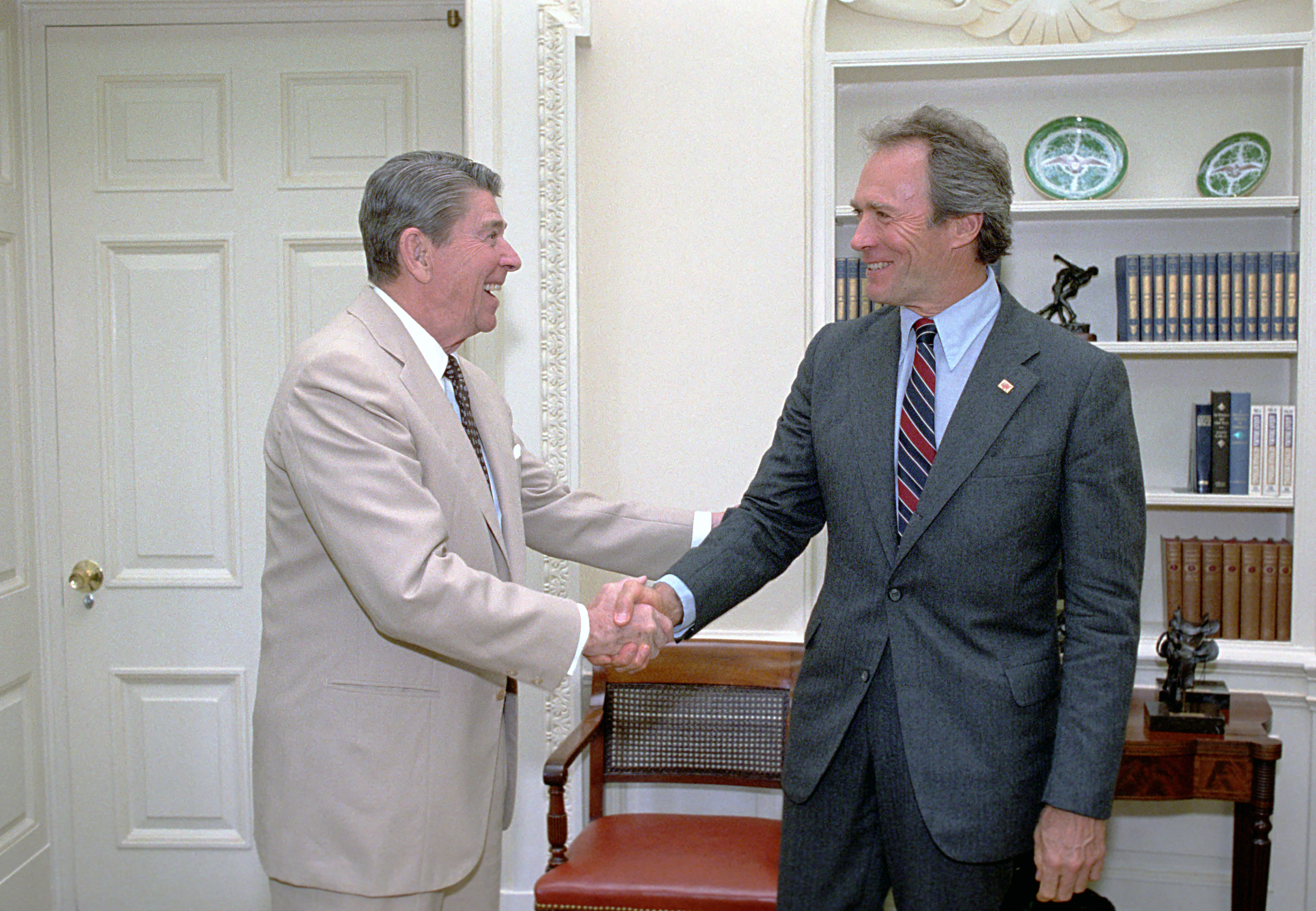
With President Ronald Reagan in 1987

Eastwood is a former Republican who has sometimes supported Democrats, and has long shown an interest in California politics; he is currently a registered Libertarian.

He won election as the nonpartisan mayor of Carmel-by-the-Sea, California, in April 1986. He earned $200 per month in that position which he donated to the Carmel Youth Center. While in office, he helped to make ice cream legal to consume on city streets, added public restrooms to the public beach, and a city library annex building was built. He served for two years and declined to run for a second term. In 2001, Governor Gray Davis appointed him to the California State Park and Recreation Commission, and Governor Arnold Schwarzenegger re-appointed him to the commission in 2009.

Eastwood endorsed Mitt Romney in the 2012 presidential election. He delivered a primetime address at the 2012 Republican National Convention, where he drew attention for a speech he delivered to an empty chair representing President Barack Obama, which he later regretted. On February 22, 2020, Eastwood endorsed Democrat Michael Bloomberg in the 2020 presidential election. Eastwood stated that he wishes that Trump would act "in a more genteel way, without tweeting and calling people names. I would personally like for him to not bring himself to that level."

== Musical interests ==
Eastwood is an aficionado of jazz—particularly bebop—and blues, country and western and classical music. He dabbled in music early on by developing as a boogie-woogie pianist and had originally intended to pursue a career in music by studying for a music theory degree after graduating from high school. In late 1959, Eastwood produced the album Cowboy Favorites, released on the Cameo label, which included some classics such as Bob Wills's "San Antonio Rose" and Cole Porter's "Don't Fence Me In". Despite his attempts to plug the album by going on a tour, it never reached the Billboard Hot 100.

In 1963, Cameo producer Kal Mann told him that "he would never make it big as a singer". Nevertheless, during the off season of filming Rawhide, Eastwood and Paul Brinegar – sometimes joined by Sheb Wooley – toured rodeos, state fairs, and festivals. In 1962, their act, entitled Amusement Business Cavalcade of Fairs, earned them as much as $15,000 a performance. Although he never made it as a major performing artist, he has passed on the influence to his son, Kyle, who is a professional jazz bassist and composer. An audiophile, Eastwood owns an extensive collection of LPs which he plays on a Rockport turntable. His favorite musicians include saxophonists Charlie Parker and Lester Young, pianists Thelonious Monk, Oscar Peterson, Dave Brubeck, and Fats Waller, and Delta bluesman Robert Johnson.

Eastwood has his own Warner Bros. Records–distributed imprint, Malpaso Records, as part of his deal with Warner Brothers. This deal was unchanged when Warner Music Group was sold by Time Warner to private investors. Malpaso Records, which has released all of the scores of Eastwood's films from The Bridges of Madison County onward, has also released the album of a 1996 jazz concert he hosted, titled Eastwood After Hours – Live at Carnegie Hall. He composed the film scores of Mystic River, Million Dollar Baby, Flags of Our Fathers, Grace Is Gone, Changeling, Hereafter, J. Edgar, and the original piano compositions for In the Line of Fire. He co-wrote and performed the song heard over the credits of Gran Torino and also co-wrote "Why Should I Care" with Linda Thompson and Carole Bayer Sager, a song recorded in 1999 by Diana Krall.

The music in Grace Is Gone received two Golden Globe nominations by the Hollywood Foreign Press Association for the 65th Golden Globe Awards. Eastwood was nominated for Best Original Score, while the song "Grace Is Gone" with music by Eastwood and lyrics by Carole Bayer Sager was nominated for Best Original Song. It won the Satellite Award for Best Song at the 12th Satellite Awards. Changeling was nominated for Best Score at the 14th Critics' Choice Awards, Best Original Score at the 66th Golden Globe Awards, and Best Music at the 35th Saturn Awards. On September 22, 2007, Eastwood was awarded an honorary Doctor of Music degree from the Berklee College of Music at the Monterey Jazz Festival, on which he serves as an active board member. Upon receiving the award he gave a speech claiming, "It's one of the great honors I'll cherish in this lifetime."

The scoring stage at Warner Bros. Studios, Burbank was renamed the Eastwood Scoring Stage in the 1990s.

== Personal life ==
Verified children of Clint Eastwood
- With an unidentified woman:
  - Laurie (born 1954)
- With Roxanne Tunis:
  - Kimber (born 1964)
- With Maggie Johnson:
  - Kyle (born 1968)
  - Alison (born 1972)
- With Jacelyn Reeves:
  - Scott (born 1986)
  - Kathryn (born 1988)
- With Frances Fisher:
  - Francesca (born 1993)
- With Dina Ruiz:
  - Morgan (born 1996)

=== Relationships and children ===
Twice divorced, Eastwood has had numerous casual and serious relationships of varying length and intensity through his life, many of which overlapped. He has eight known children by six women, only half of whom were contemporaneously acknowledged. Eastwood refuses to confirm his exact number of offspring, and media reports have widely differed on the total. He avoids discussing his families with the press, stating, "they're vulnerable people. I can protect myself, but they can't." His biographer, Patrick McGilligan, has said on camera that Eastwood's total number of children is indeterminate and that "one was when he was still in high school".

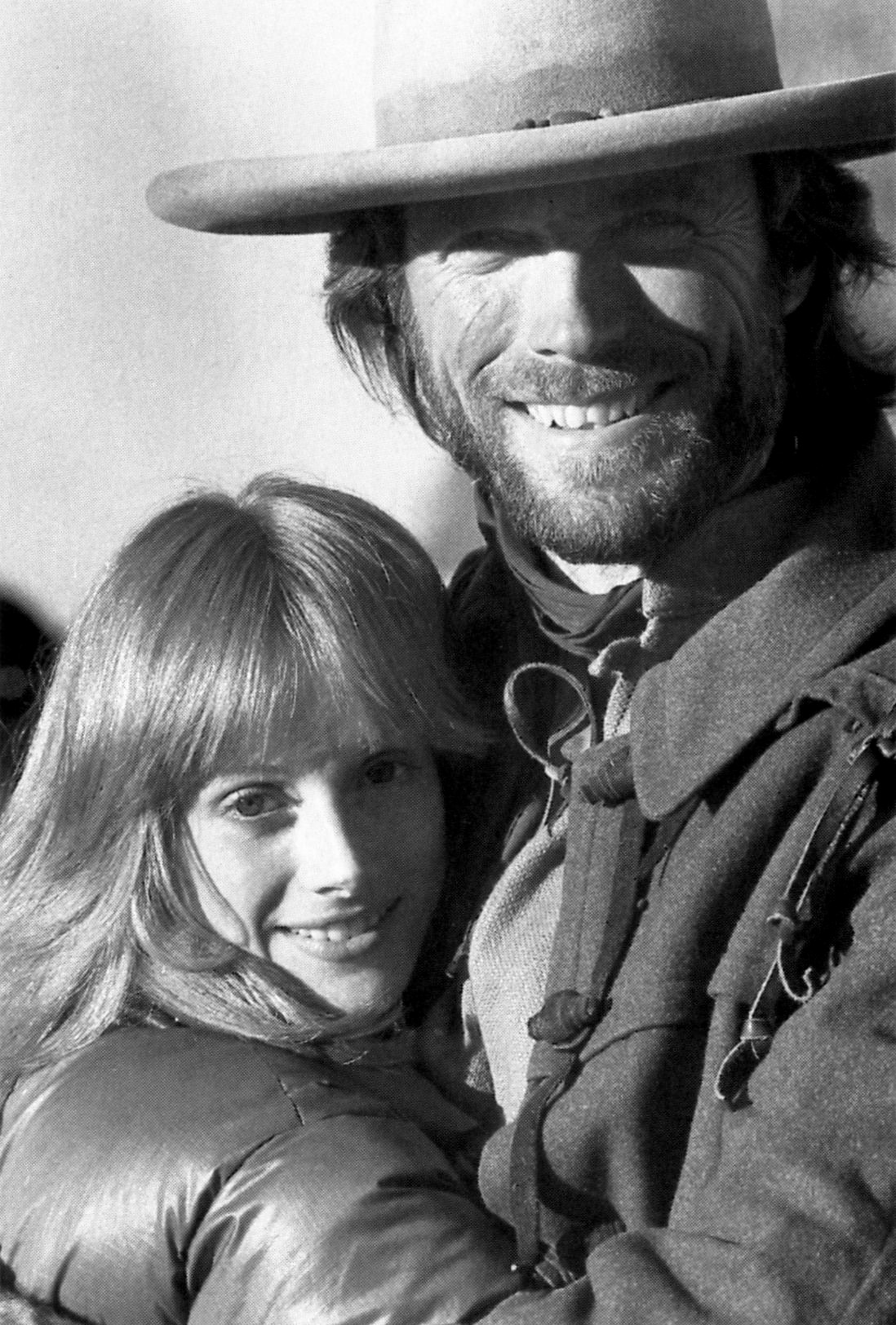
Locke and Eastwood in 1975 during the filming of The Outlaw Josey Wales

Eastwood's first marriage was to manufacturing secretary-turned-fitness instructor Margaret Neville Johnson (1931–2026) in December 1953, after meeting her on a blind date the previous May. During the courtship, he had an affair that resulted in his daughter Laurie (born 1954), who was adopted by Clyde and Helen Warren of Seattle. While the identity of Laurie's biological mother is not public record, McGilligan stated that she belonged to a theater group Eastwood participated in. (Note: In a December 2018 interview, Eastwood's grandson Lowell Thomas Murray IV said his yet-to-be-identified maternal grandmother "never told Eastwood she was pregnant or spoke to him again. It was clear he had no idea, so to make him look like a bad guy is inaccurate." This notion is expressly denied by Patrick McGilligan, who insists Eastwood knew full well that he got a woman from Washington state pregnant and—according to McGilligan's "impeccable" sources—had told friends he suspected he might have a child there.) Eastwood continued having affairs while married to Johnson, including a 1959–1973 relationship with stuntwoman Roxanne Tunis that produced a daughter, Kimber (born 1964). Tunis and Eastwood maintained a "healthy relationship" until her death in 2023.

Johnson tolerated the open marriage with Eastwood, and the couple eventually had two children, Kyle (born 1968) and Alison (born 1972). In 1975, Eastwood and married actress-director Sondra Locke began living together; she had been in a marriage of convenience since 1967 with Gordon Leigh Anderson, an unemployed homosexual. Locke claimed that Eastwood sang "She Made Me Monogamous" to her and confided he had "never been in love before". Fritz Manes, who had known Eastwood since junior high, described the relationship with Locke as "absolute total, blind love". Eastwood divorced Johnson in 1984. Locke remained married to Anderson until her death in 2018. According to Bill Brown, publisher of the Carmel Pine Cone, Eastwood considered Locke the love of his life, yet he has never addressed her death.

In an unpublicized affair, Eastwood fathered two legally fatherless children, Scott (born 1986) and Kathryn (born 1988) with flight attendant Jacelyn Reeves. When Locke and Eastwood separated in 1989, she filed a palimony lawsuit and later sued for fraud, reaching settlements in both cases. During the early to mid-1990s, Eastwood had a relationship with actress Frances Fisher that resulted in a daughter, Francesca (born 1993). Eastwood married for the second time in 1996, to news anchor Dina Ruiz, who gave birth to their daughter Morgan that same year. Ruiz and Eastwood's marriage lasted until 2014.

Beginning in 2014, Eastwood was seen in the company of restaurant hostess Christina Sandera, though neither publicly confirmed a romance. Eastwood's spokespeople, managers, and press agents have long denied any knowledge of his personal life. Sandera died of a heart attack in July 2024, at age 61. By the fall of that year, Eastwood was in a new relationship, though his girlfriend has not been identified.

=== Health and leisure activities ===
Locke and Eastwood at the 1979 Long Beach Grand Prix

Eastwood has been a health and fitness fanatic since his teens. During the production of Rawhide, he appeared in magazines and journals that often documented his health-conscious lifestyle. In an August 1959 edition of TV Guide, for example, Eastwood was photographed doing push-ups. He offered tips on fitness and nutrition, advising people to eat plenty of fruit and raw vegetables, take vitamins, and avoid sugar-loaded beverages, excessive alcohol, and overloading on carbohydrates.

Eastwood's father's death from a heart attack at age 64 in 1970, described by Fritz Manes as "the only bad thing that ever happened to him in his life", came as a shock to Eastwood, especially since his grandfather had lived to be 92. It had a profound impact on his life; from that point forward he became more productive, working with greater speed and efficiency on set, and adopted an even more rigorous health regimen. Despite abstaining from hard liquor, he co-opened an old English-inspired pub called the Hog's Breath Inn in Carmel-by-the-Sea in 1971. Eastwood eventually sold the pub in 1999 and now owns the Mission Ranch Hotel and Restaurant, also located in Carmel-by-the-Sea.

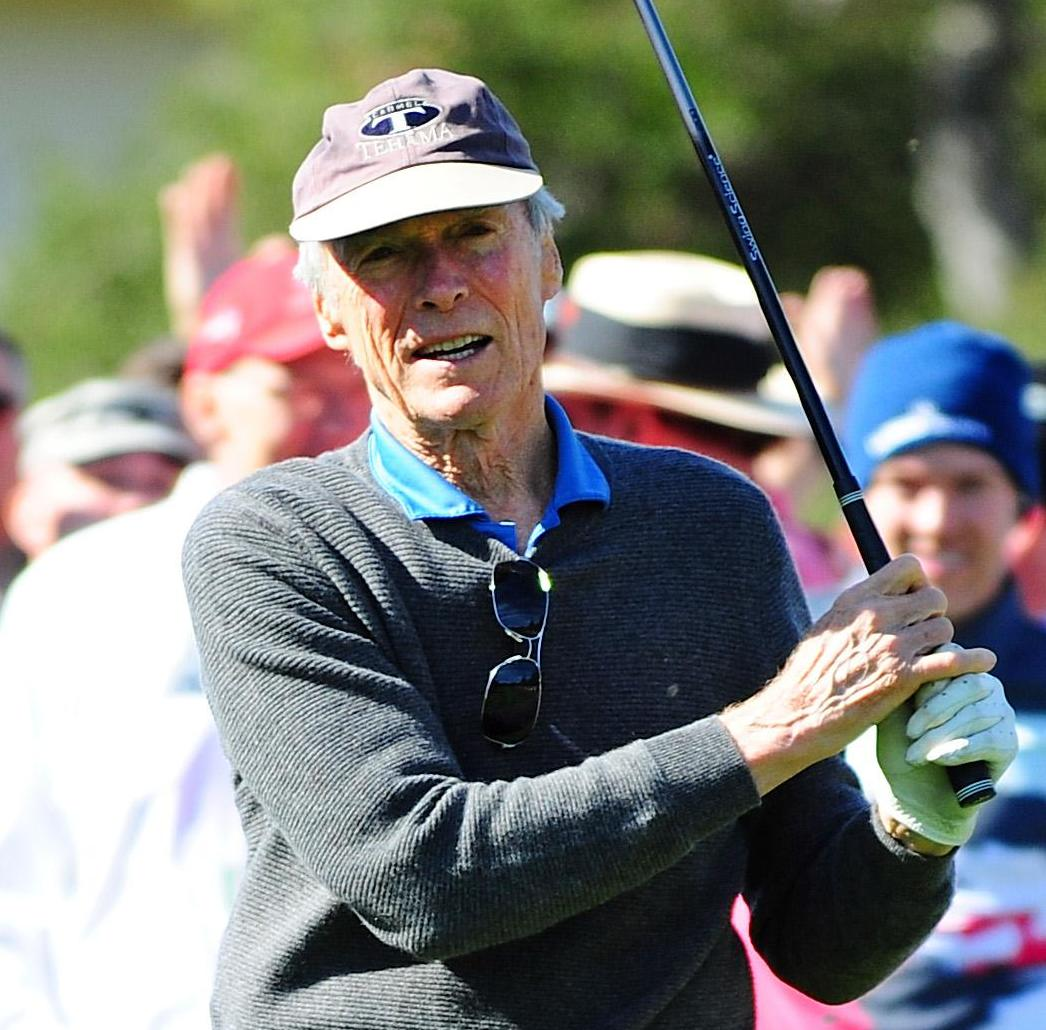
Playing golf at a charity fundraising event in 2015

Eastwood is an avid golfer and owns the Tehàma Golf Club. He is an investor in the world-renowned Pebble Beach Golf Links west of Carmel and donates his time to charitable causes at major tournaments. Eastwood is an FAA-licensed fixed wing and rotary craft private pilot and often flies his helicopter to the studios to avoid traffic.

=== Spiritual beliefs and meditation ===
In 1973, Eastwood told the film critic Gene Siskel, "No, I don't believe in God." Eastwood has said that he finds spirituality in nature (as suggested by his Western, Pale Rider, 1985), explaining that "I was born during the Depression and I was brought up with no specific church. We moved every four or five months during the first 14 years of my life, so I was sent to a different church depending on wherever we lived. Most of them were Protestant, but I went to other churches because my parents wanted me to try to figure out things for myself. They always said, 'I just want to expose you to some religious order and see if that's something you like'. So although my religious training was not really specific, I do feel spiritual things. If I stand on the side of the Grand Canyon and look down, it moves me in some way."

He has also said: "It would be wonderful to talk with my parents again, who are, of course, deceased. It makes the idea of death much less scary. But then again, if you think that nothing happens after you die, maybe it makes you live life better. Maybe you're supposed to do the best you can by the gift you're given of life and that alone."

In 1975, Eastwood publicly acknowledged his participation in Transcendental Meditation when he appeared on The Merv Griffin Show with Maharishi Mahesh Yogi, the founder of Transcendental Meditation. He has meditated every morning for years.

=== Real estate interests ===
While serving in the US Army at nearby Fort Ord, Eastwood developed an interest in Carmel area real estate. Using income from his acting career, on December 24, 1967, he bought five parcels totaling 283 acres (115 ha) of land from Charles Sawyer along Highway 1 near Malpaso Creek, south of the Carmel Highlands.

In May 1968, Eastwood and actor James Garner bought 340 acres (138 ha) of wooded land in Carmel Valley from the Howard Hattan estate for $640,000. The property was located across Carmel Valley Road from the Rancho Cañada Country Club and golf course. Eastwood and Garner donated the undeveloped land to the Housing Authority of the County of Monterey in November 1983, with the stipulation that part of it be used for senior housing.

He named his production company Malpaso Productions. Eastwood later bought another parcel in the Highlands, together totaling 650 acres (263 ha) across six parcels. In 1995, Monterey County purchased the Malpaso land from him for $3.08 million and placed a permanent conservation easement on the property. Using the proceeds from the sale, Eastwood bought the 134 acres (54 ha) Odello Ranch at the mouth of the Carmel River that same year. He paid to lower the levees along the southern side of the Carmel River to protect the Mission Ranch resort he owned, as well as the neighboring Mission Fields residential area on the north side of the river, both of which were flooded in 1994.

In 1997, Eastwood and his former wife Maggie Johnson, acting as the Eastwood Trust, donated 49 acres (20 ha) of the Odello Ranch property east of Highway 1 to the Big Sur Land Trust, along with the associated water rights. On June 28, 2016, Eastwood donated the remaining Odello East land. He also purchased 550 acres (223 ha), known as the Cañada Woods development, immediately east of the Odello Ranch.

In 2010, at age 80, Eastwood spent approximately $20 million to build a 15,949-square-foot (1,481.7 m^{2}) compound in Carmel-by-the-Sea. His California real estate portfolio also includes a 6,136-square-foot (570.1 m^{2}) Spanish-style mansion in Bel-Air, the 1,067.5-acre (432.0 ha) Rising River Ranch near Cassel, an apartment in Burbank, and a 5,575-square-foot (517.9 m^{2}) Desert modern home in La Quinta (sometimes misidentified as Palm Springs), as well as a large but understated house located next door to his longtime primary Bel-Air residence. Eastwood is also known to have purchased property in two other states. He owns a 5,700-square-foot (530 m^{2}) house in Sun Valley, Idaho, and a 1.13-acre, oceanfront manor in Kihei, Hawaii. The latter was featured in an episode of the 2012 reality show Mrs. Eastwood & Company.

Eastwood previously lived in Studio City, Sherman Oaks, Tiburon, and Pebble Beach.

== Filmography ==
Eastwood has contributed to over 70 films during his career as actor, director, producer, and composer. He has acted in several television series, including his co-starring role in Rawhide. He started directing in 1971, and made his debut as a producer in 1982 with Firefox, though he had been functioning as uncredited producer on all of his Malpaso Company films since Hang 'Em High in 1968. Eastwood also has contributed music to his films, either through performing, writing, or composing. He has mainly starred in western, action, and drama films. According to the box office revenue tracking website Box Office Mojo, films featuring Eastwood have grossed a total of more than $1.81 billion domestically, with an average of $38.6 million per film.

== Awards and honors ==
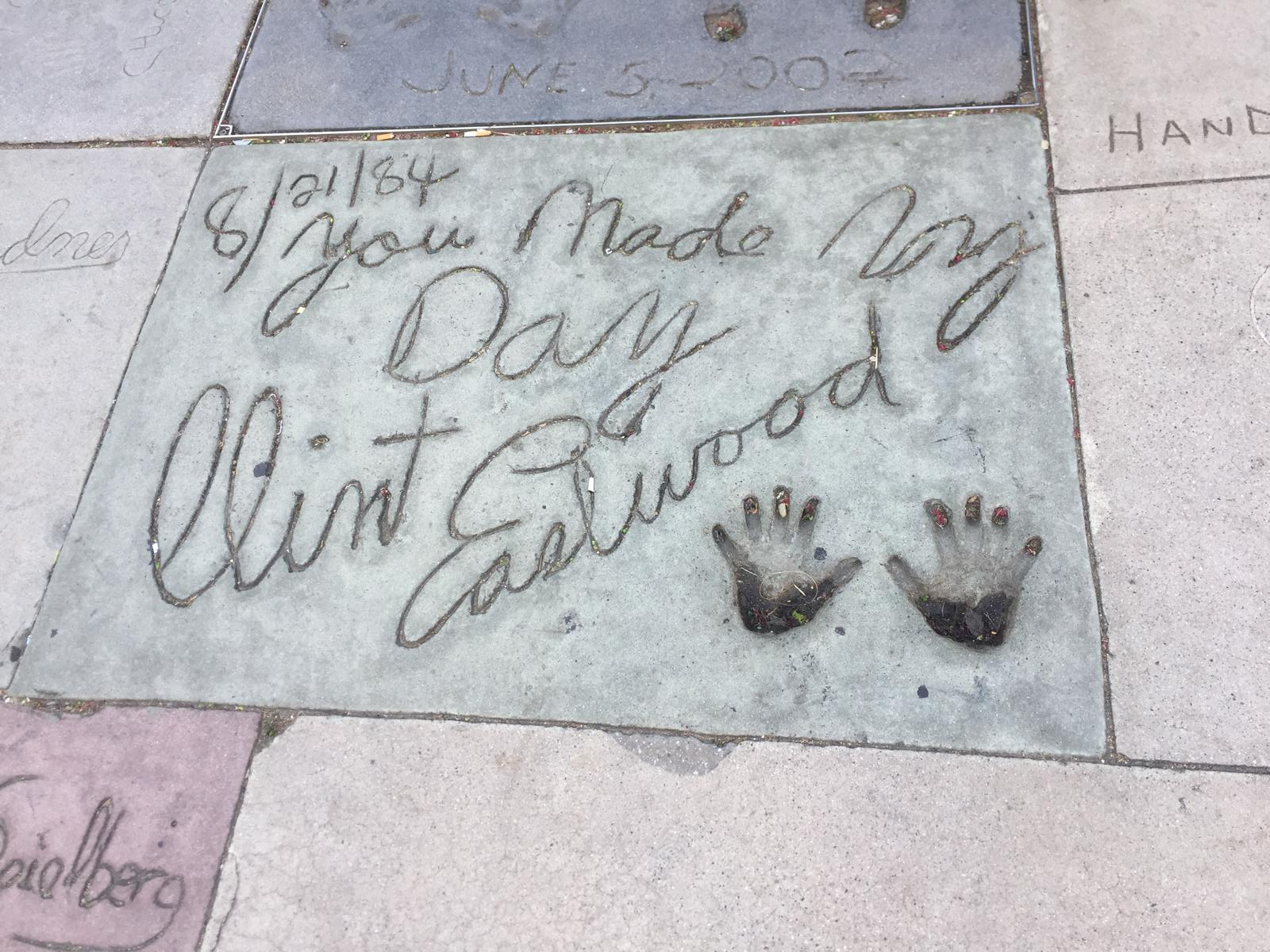
Eastwood's signature and handprints in Hollywood Boulevard

Eastwood has been recognized with multiple awards and nominations for his work in film, television, and music. His widest reception has been in film work, for which he has received Academy Awards, Directors Guild of America Awards, Golden Globe Awards, and People's Choice Awards, among others. Eastwood is one of only two people to have been twice nominated for Best Actor and Best Director for the same film (Unforgiven and Million Dollar Baby) the other being Warren Beatty (Heaven Can Wait and Reds).

Along with Beatty, Robert Redford, Richard Attenborough, Kevin Costner, and Mel Gibson, he is one of the few directors who is best known as an actor but also has won an Academy Award for directing. On February 27, 2005, he became one of only three living directors, along with Miloš Forman and Francis Ford Coppola, to have directed two Best Picture winners. At the age of 74, he was the oldest recipient of the Academy Award for Best Director to date. Eastwood has directed five actors in Academy Award–winning performances: Gene Hackman in Unforgiven, Tim Robbins and Sean Penn in Mystic River, and Morgan Freeman and Hilary Swank in Million Dollar Baby.

On August 21, 1984, Eastwood was honored at a ceremony at Grauman's Chinese Theatre to record his hand and footprints in cement. Eastwood received the AFI Life Achievement Award in 1996, and received an honorary degree from AFI in 2009. On December 6, 2006, California Governor Arnold Schwarzenegger and First Lady Maria Shriver inducted Eastwood into the California Hall of Fame located at The California Museum for History, Women, and the Arts.

In 2007, Eastwood was presented with the highest civilian distinction in France, Légion d'honneur, at a ceremony in Paris. French President Jacques Chirac told Eastwood that he embodied "the best of Hollywood". In October 2009, he was honored with the Lumière Award (in honor of the Lumière Brothers, inventors of the Cinematograph) at the inaugural Lumière Festival in Lyon, France. This award honors his entire career and his major contribution to the 7th Art. In February 2010, Eastwood was recognized by President Barack Obama with an arts and humanities award. Obama described Eastwood's films as "essays in individuality, hard truths and the essence of what it means to be American".

Eastwood has also been awarded at least three honorary degrees from universities and colleges, including an honorary degree from the University of the Pacific in 2006, an honorary Doctor of Humane Letters from the University of Southern California on May 27, 2007, and an honorary Doctor of Music degree from the Berklee College of Music at the Monterey Jazz Festival on September 22, 2007.

On February 26, 2009, Eastwood received the Cannes Film Festival's Honorary Golden Palm Award at a private ceremony in Paris. In the same year on July 22, he was honored by Emperor Akihito of Japan with the Order of the Rising Sun, 3rd class, Gold Rays with Neck Ribbon for his contributions to the enhancement of Japan–United States relations.

Eastwood won the Golden Pine lifetime achievement award at the 2013 International Samobor Film Music Festival, along with Ryuichi Sakamoto and Gerald Fried.

Awards received by Eastwood's films
Year	Title	Academy Awards		BAFTA Awards		Golden Globe Awards	
Year	Title	Noms.	Wins	Noms.	Wins	Noms.	Wins
1971	Play Misty for Me					1	
1973	Breezy					3	
1976	The Outlaw Josey Wales	1					
1986	Heartbreak Ridge	1					
1988	Bird	1	1	2		3	1
1992	Unforgiven	9	4	6	1	4	2
1995	The Bridges of Madison County	1				2	
2000	Space Cowboys	1					
2003	Mystic River	6	2	4		5	2
2004	Million Dollar Baby	7	4			5	2
2006	Flags of Our Fathers	2				1	
2006	Letters from Iwo Jima	4	1			1	1
2008	Changeling	3		8		2	
2008	Gran Torino					1	
2009	Invictus	2				3	
2010	Hereafter	1					
2011	J. Edgar					1	
2014	American Sniper	6	1	2			
2016	Sully	1					
2019	Richard Jewell	1				1	
Total		41	13	22	1	33	8

== See also ==
- List of atheists in film, radio, television and theater
- List of American libertarians
