= Tehàma Golf Club =

Californian private golf club near Carmel Valley

Tehama Golf Club
- Location within California Location within the United States
- 36°33′39″N 121°50′09″W

Club information
- Location: Carmel, California, United States
- Established: 1999
- Type: Private Non-Equity
- Owner: Clint Eastwood
- Operator: Tehama Golf Club
- Total holes: 18
- Website: www.tehamagolfclub.com/Golf/
- Designed by: Jay Morrish
- Par: 72
- Length: 6,506 yards (5,949 m)
- Course rating: 71
- Slope rating: 135

Tehàma Golf Club (/təˈheɪmə/ tə-HAY-mə) is a private golf club outside of Carmel Valley, California owned by Clint Eastwood and is part of the Tehàma private community. Designed by golf architect Jay Morrish, ASGCA and opened in 1999, the private course features 6,506 yards (5,949 m) that overlook the Pacific, and it is surrounded by privately owned homesites. Membership is by invitation only.

The Spanish style clubhouse features a bar, restaurant, ballroom, and four suites, with interior design by American art director Henry Bumstead.

== Scorecard ==
Tehama Golf Club
Tee	Rating/Slope	1	2	3	4	5	6	7	8	9	Out	10	11	12	13	14	15	16	17	18	In	Total
Par		5	4	3	5	4	3	4	4	5	37	4	5	3	4	3	5	4	3	4	35	72
Black	72.8 / 138	544	415	146	530	280	158	407	417	435	3332	444	505	152	457	222	466	374	145	470	3235	6567
Blue	71.7 / 135	526	383	138	522	254	148	399	378	408	3156	440	490	142	437	196	457	351	134	450	3097	6253
White	70/0 / 130	499	358	112	500	251	138	383	362	408	3011	417	474	123	407	180	450	337	122	424	2934	5945
SI	Men's	7	5	15	1	17	13	3	9	11		4	8	18	2	10	12	14	16	6
Long Red	71.6 / 126	443	330	101	427	211	125	301	328	338	2604	366	458	106	331	157	401	259	114	337	2529	5133
Short Red	70.7 / 123	443	290	101	427	211	106	301	328	300	2507	366	416	106	331	131	401	259	114	337	2461	4968
SI	Women's	7	3	15	1	17	13	9	5	11		12	2	18	4	10	8	14	16	6
