= Blake Cooper Griffin =

American actor

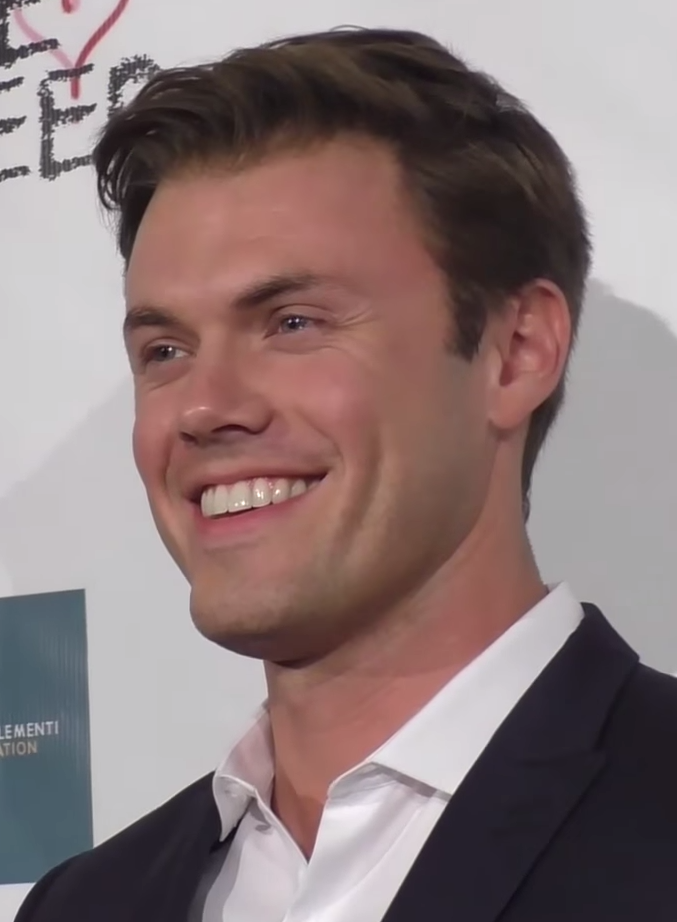
- Griffin at the premiere of Love Is All You Need? in 2016
- Born: Columbia, South Carolina, U.S.
- Education: University of North Carolina School of the Arts
- Occupation: Actor
- Years active: 2008–present

Blake Cooper Griffin is an American actor. He is best known for his roles on HBO Max's Winning Time: The Rise of the Lakers Dynasty, AMC's Preacher, TNT's Animal Kingdom, and Ryan Murphy's Dahmer - Monster: The Jeffrey Dahmer Story. Griffin was also the star of Beerfest: Thirst for Victory, CW Seed's first original film. His notable film work includes Leah Mckendrick's Scrambled, D. J. Caruso's Standing Up, Helen Hunt's Ride, Life of a King with Cuba Gooding Jr., and Love Is All You Need?, portraying the role of Bill Bradley.

== Early life ==
Griffin was born in Columbia, South Carolina. He has one sister. He is openly gay.

== Career ==
Griffin is a graduate of the prestigious School of Drama at the North Carolina School of the Arts. Once graduating, he signed with an agent who convinced him to move Los Angeles to begin his career.

Soon after moving to Los Angeles, he performed the role of The Prince, opposite Broadway actress Ashley Brown, in the world symphonic premiere of Snow White and the Seven Dwarfs - A Symphonic Retelling, at the Walt Disney Concert Hall in Los Angeles, with the Hollywood Bowl Orchestra conducted by John Mauceri.

In 2011, Griffin was cast as Trent Rogers on the USA Network drama Necessary Roughness.

In 2014, Deadline Hollywood announced that Griffin had joined the cast of the twenty-something ensemble drama Flipside being executive produced by Mark Feuerstein in conjunction with Wind Dancer Films.

He has appeared on many television shows including Castle, Jessie, Castle, Greek, Law & Order: Criminal Intent, Major Crimes, Mad Love, 90210, NCIS: LA, as well as the NBC television event Game of Your Life, where Griffin starred opposite Leah Thompson. Griffin can be seen in the 2016 made-for-TV movie Before You Say I Do.

In 2016, Griffin was cast in an episode of House of Lies; the episode was directed by Helen Hunt. He was previously directed by Hunt in the feature film Ride.

Other major film roles include: Eric in Standing Up with Val Kilmer, J. Thomas Gaines in the chess drama Life of a King, and Bill Bradley in 'Love is All You Need? directed by K. Rocco Shields. The film also stars Tyler Blackburn, Emily Osment, Briana Evigan, and Jeremy Sisto.

In 2018, Griffin starred in the CW Seed reboot of the Warner Bros film Beerfest. Beerfest: Thirst for Victory is inspired by the 2006 Broken Lizard/Warner Bros cult classic film; it the first original film from the network. Griffin portrays the character Scott.

Griffin guest starred in Marvel's Cloak & Dagger and the Mad About You Reboot, where he again worked with Helen Hunt. In 2020, it was announced that Griffin would be a part of the fifth season of Animal Kingdom on TNT, portraying the role of Lewis. In 2021, Griffin joined the HBO Max series Winning Time: The Rise of the Lakers Dynasty that chronicles the creation of the Los Angeles Lakers; the series stars John C. Reilly. Griffin is portraying the role of Wesley.

In 2022, Deadline Hollywood announced that Griffin had joined the cast of Dahmer - Monster: The Jeffrey Dahmer Story, the Ryan Murphy and Ian Brennan’s limited series that chronicles the story of one of America’s most notorious serial killers. American Horror Story alum Evan Peters stars as Dahmer and also executive produces. Griffin portrays the role of Charles in the series that will play on Netflix.

In 2024, Griffin played the hilarious, obsessive, cult leader "Owen" in Leah Mckendrick's Lionsgate feature film, Scrambled.

== Politics and Philanthropy ==
In 2016, Griffin joined several other Hollywood actors on the campaign trail as a vocal surrogate for former Secretary of State Hillary Clinton's presidential campaign. Griffin travelled to several battleground states, giving speeches at campaign rallies in support of Clinton. The actor also appeared at various fundraisers and was among the celebrity hosts at the Los Angeles launch of Millennials for Hillary.

In 2017, Griffin gave the keynote speech outside of the Georgia State Capitol building at a rally designed to push back against Congressional efforts to repeal the Affordable Care Act.

Griffin has lent considerable charitable efforts to various anti-bullying causes, routinely appearing at events as a show of support. Griffin even collaborated with NPR to develop a 'listening kit' which examined the topic of bullying in depth.

Ahead of the 2020 Presidential election, Blake acted as a surrogate for Democratic Presidential nominee and former Vice President Joe Biden, posting social media endorsement videos and hosting a #TeamJoeTalks Live on Instagram Live with former Baltimore Mayor Stephanie Rawlings-Blake. Griffin travelled to the battleground state of North Carolina for the campaign the final week of the election, in a get out the vote blitz for the former Vice President and his running mate Kamala Harris, alongside other Hollywood performers including Common.

== Filmography ==
Year	Title	Role	Notes
2008	Princess Alisanne	Prince Edward	Short
2008	Milk	Castro Man	Uncredited
2009	Spread	Man at Bar	Uncredited
2009	Greek	Condon Debney	Episode: "Condon Debney"
2009	Dire Wolf	Jim Martin	
2010	Law & Order: Criminal Intent	Jason Lankaster	Episode: "Abel & Willing"
2010	Sex Tax: Based on a True Story	Newsman Jake	
2011	Mad Love	Terry	Episode: "Pub Quiz"
2011	LA Noire	Christopher Majewski	Video Game, Voice
2011	Necessary Roughness	Trent Rogers	3 episodes
2011	90210	Ronnie	Episode: "Project Runaway"
2011	Game of Your Life	Andy Rychman	TV movie
2011	Super Shark	Thomas Carmichael	
2012	NCIS: Los Angeles	Marine Gunnery Sergeant Booker	Episode: "Vengeance"
2013	Unattainable	Rex	Short
2013	Standing Up	Eric	
2013	Life of a King	J. Thomas Gaines	
2014	Castle	Ross De Koning	Episode: "Law & Boarder"
2014	Los Feliz: 90027	Lucas Collins	Episode: "Pilot"
2014	Ride	Waiter	
2015	Jessie	Scott	Episode: "What a Steal"
2015	Major Crimes	Brad Pearson	Episode: "Turn Down"
2016	Love Is All You Need?	Bill Bradley	
2016	House of Lies	J.P. Driver	Episode: "Violent Agreement"
2016	Exit Survey	Geof	Short
2017	Preacher	Jimmy	Episode: "Pig"
2017	Before You Say I Do	Stephen Hower	TV movie
2018	Beerfest: Thirst for Victory	Scott	TV movie
2019	Cloak & Dagger	Meathead	Episode: "B Sides"
2019	Mad About You	Aaron	(Reboot), Episode: "Real Estate for Beginners"
2020	Animal Kingdom	Lewis	
2021	Winning Time: The Rise of the Lakers Dynasty	Wesley	
2022	Shoulder Dance	Tony	
2022	Dahmer - Monster: The Jeffrey Dahmer Story	Charles	Netflix
2023	Shoulder Dance	Tony	
2024	Scrambled	Owen	Lionsgate
2024	The Holiday Exchange	James	
