= The Real World: D.C. =

Coordinates: 38°54′50″N 77°02′42″W

- Season 23
- The cast of The Real World: D.C.
- Starring: Callie Walker; Ty Ruff; Ashley Lindley; Mike Manning; Emily Schromm; Andrew Woods; Josh Colon; Erika Lauren Wasilewski
- No. of episodes: 14

Release
- Original network: MTV
- Original release: December 30, 2009 – March 31, 2010

Season chronology
- ← Previous; The Real World: Cancun Next → The Real World: New Orleans

The Real World: D.C., (occasionally known as The Real World: Washington, D.C.), is the twenty-third season of MTV's reality television series The Real World, which focuses on a group of diverse strangers living together for several months in a different city each season, as cameras follow their lives and interpersonal relationships. It is the fifth season of The Real World to be filmed in the Mid-Atlantic States region of the United States.

The season featured eight people who lived in a house in Dupont Circle. Washington, D.C. was officially announced as the location for the newest season on June 10, 2009. Filming began on July 2, 2009 and completed on October 12, 2009. The season's December 30, 2009 premiere was watched by 1.9 million viewers. The March 31, 2010 season finale was watched by 1.1 million viewers, the record low at the time for a season finale of The Real World. The finale was immediately followed with a reunion special, The Real World: Washington D.C. Reunion. Overall, the season averaged 1.5 million viewers a week and consisted of 14 episodes.

According to MTV's President of Programming, Tony DiSanto, "The charged atmosphere of Washington D.C., the center of our country's social and political change, will provide an electric setting for this next season of The Real World. We are thrilled to be filming our classic franchise in the heart of where history is being made ... it adds a whole new dimension to the great characters and drama our viewers expect and love from The Real World." Washington, D.C. Mayor Adrian Fenty welcomed the production, pointing to the impact of young people on the national scene.

The Washington Capitals hockey team, singer Melissa Etheridge and Washington Post cartoonist Tom Toles make guest appearances this season, in which they interact with the cast. President Barack Obama also appears in two episodes in which cast member Andrew Woods, an aspiring cartoonist, attends a press conference with Washington Times senior correspondent Joe Curl as part of Woods' internship with the newspaper, and when cast member and LGBT rights activist Mike Manning attends the October 10, 2009 Human Rights Campaign dinner at which Obama spoke. Manning also meets with Congressman Jared Polis of Colorado and Congressman James P. Moran of Virginia during the course of his work for the HRC.

== Season changes ==
As with The Real World: Brooklyn, the Washington, D.C. cast was not given a group assignment, and was free to pursue their own interests. Various cast members are seen throughout the season pursuing career opportunities, bartending, and participating in internships and charity work with local businesses and organizations.

== The residence ==
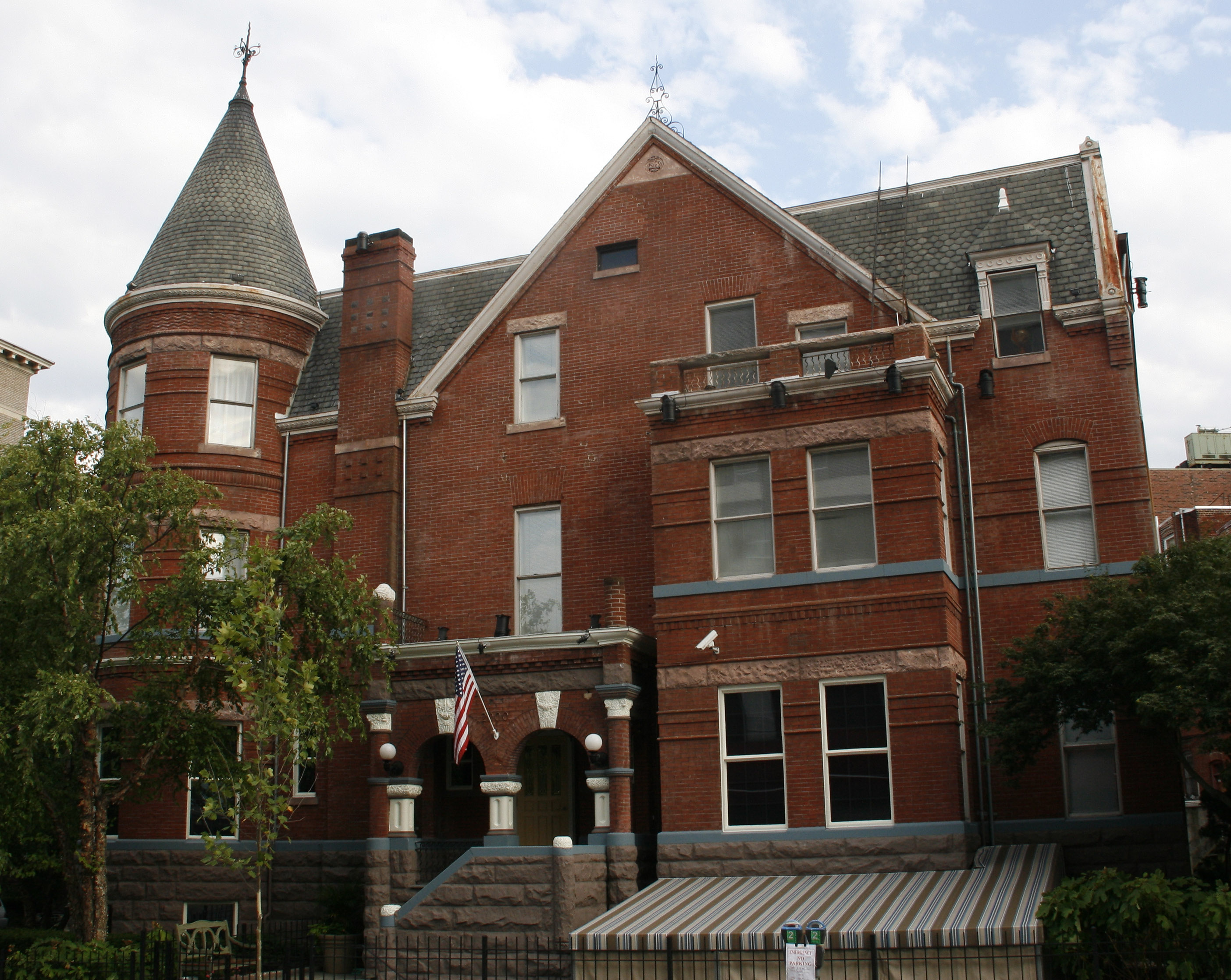
The Dupont Circle house where the cast resided

The cast members lived in a 10,800 ft^{2} (1,003 m^{2}) house located at 2000 S Street, NW in Dupont Circle, a neighborhood known for its historic buildings, embassies, dining establishments, and its gay community. The cast members' four-story brownstone mansion was originally constructed in 1891 for a Baltimore and Ohio Railroad executive, James Mosher, and his new wife, Minnie. The building is a contributing property to the Dupont Circle Historic District and its property value is $5,692,000. It is now the permanent home of the Laogai Museum.

Four building permits were issued in May 2009, including one for demolition of the interior walls. Building plans show the first floor includes bedrooms, a game room, the Confessional, and a control room for the show's producers. The second floor includes the common area, telephone room, kitchen, bathrooms, and five "love sacks". The main control room is located on the home's third floor, while a conference room and offices are located on the fourth floor.

== Cast ==
As with the previous two seasons, the cast includes eight members. Local bars that were used as frequent hangouts for cast members included Halo, located in nearby Logan Circle; Town Danceboutique, located in Shaw; and The Russia House, located one block west of the cast's house. The cast also attended local sporting events, such as a D.C. United soccer games at RFK Stadium.

Cast member	Age^{1}	Hometown
Andrew Woods	21	Westminster, Colorado
Andrew is a comic book creator and painter known for his politically incorrect comics, and for his tendency to provoke reactions from people, a trait that led to his being the only student, according to him, to be fired from Colorado State University's school paper, The Rocky Mountain Collegian, whose staff felt he was intentionally trying to offend certain groups with his cartoons. He has a younger brother named William, who visits in Episode 10. He chafes against authority, and as a result has been fired from every job that he's had. Having been dumped by his unfaithful girlfriend, he intends to socialize with women in D.C. MTV describes him as "the annoying little brother that you love to hate, but secretly love." Andrew, who states that he likes women who are "young, blonde and ditzy" (a preference that Callie and Ashley find distasteful), spends the first two thirds of the season unsuccessfully attempting to find sexual partners. He finds success in Episode 11 with a woman named Andrea, who causes him to reevaluate his casual approach to sex. In explaining his distrust of women, he mentions that his mother cheated on his father, and that he regards her as an otherwise good parent. Because of the panda hat he sometimes wears, he earns the nickname "Panda". In the reunion show, Mike opines that Andrew was the cast member to undergo the greatest change.
Ashley Lindley	22	Houston, Texas
Ashley was born in Fort Bragg, California, but moved to Houston to be closer to her now ex-boyfriend. She detests Houston for its climate, culture and the ubiquity of Republicans. Just before finding out that she was cast on The Real World, she modeled in a private test shooting for Playboy and was photographed by Mikki Chernoff. She is of Portuguese descent, and is a caregiver, and former delegate from Las Vegas, Nevada for Barack Obama in the 2008 United States presidential election. As a child, she and her mother suffered violence at the hands of her stepfather, and does not have relationships with her family members, including her mother, who cut ties with Ashley a year and a half ago. She now considers her closest friends to be her family, and hopes to add her housemates to that group. She is a voracious reader and passionate debater whom MTV describes as possibly the most politically aware of the cast, with a "hot temper and a blunt demeanor" that manifests itself in discussions of politics and religion. She is also described as full of contradictions, as she is a tomboy who wears dresses, a liberal Episcopalian Christian who goes to church every Sunday, etc. She is newly single, and hopes to take advantage of this while in D.C. She looks forward to traveling abroad one day, and does not find the prospect of a salaried office job appealing.
Callie Walker	21	Huntsville, Texas
Callie is a small-town girl and aspiring photographer who endured living in warehouses and junkyards as a child. She has long-felt out of place in her conservative hometown though she insists that she is conservative herself, and not a liberal. She has an older brother named Cameron, and a mother who is a personal trainer and aerobics instructor, which has contributed to her struggle with poor body image. She hopes to find outlets for her creativity in D.C. that have thus far eluded her at home. She is a vegan whom MTV describes as a free-spirit. After moving into the Real World house, Callie began working as an intern for the Washington Blade.
Emily Schromm	20	Columbia, Missouri
Emily is a student at the University of Missouri and was discovered by casting director while working as a barista at a Starbucks on campus near casting calls. Emily and her two older sisters, Michelle and Amy, were raised in what she describes as an oppressive, "cult-like religion" in which she felt they were in danger of losing themselves. Since leaving that group at 13 or 14, she has tried to make up for lost time, engaging in activities from clubbing to rock climbing to target shooting. She has developed a skepticism of religion that she shares with Ty, and an open-minded, "daredevil by nature" with whom she searches for new experiences to broaden her horizons, an attitude that carries over to her dating habits. She is also described as an athletic tomboy who used sports to transition to a more secular life, of which her stay in D.C. is an example. She has expressed an openness to the possibility of bisexuality, though she concedes that she tends to push people away because of her commitment issues. She immediately develops a sexual relationship with Ty, though it soon ends, and their time together is marked by frequent conflict, including physical confrontations. She enjoys writing poetry, yoga and football, and goes on a date with a local woman during her time on the show.
Erika Lauren Wasilewski	21	Frankfort, Illinois
Erika is a singer, songwriter, and guitarist currently in a group called Hawkeye. An ardent lover of the rock lifestyle, she likes to be the center of attention, both professionally and personally. She has a history of childhood loneliness and depression, and having successfully faced those challenges, her lingering need for affection is evident in her relationship with her boyfriend Ian, from whom separation is difficult while in D.C. During the season, she expresses frustration and discomfort in regard to her musical plans, her recurring depression, and her presence in the house, though she regards Callie as her one true friend. She eventually moves out in Episode 12.
Josh Colon	23	South Philadelphia, Pennsylvania
Josh is a Puerto Rican/Italian singer/songwriter/dancer from South Philadelphia, specializing in glam rock, rap, and punk-funkadelic music. He used to be the lead singer in a band called Whiskey Livin', and is currently working on a solo project. He dropped out of high school twice and was jailed due to a prior association with gangs he says he longer harbors. He likes to dress well, and is described as a quintessential ladies' man, though he concedes that his attraction to women is his main weakness, which may make it difficult to stay faithful to his girlfriend of three years, Ashley. After moving into the Real World house, Josh began working part-time as a bartender in Georgetown. He also forms a band while in DC named Wicked Liquid. He is very close to his family, which includes a younger brother named Dante, and a mother whose coming out as bisexual helps Josh understand what Mike goes through. Although he hopes to be the front man in a rock band, he also entertains the possibility of being a screenwriter or actor. The cast comes to perceive Josh as sometimes exhibiting vanity with the persona that he projects. In the reunion special, Ashley refers to his "peacockishness", and Mike observes that there is a "Hollywood Josh" and a "Regular Josh", and that Josh sometimes does not realize when he is exhibiting the former.
Mike Manning	22	Thornton, Colorado
Mike is a former star high school athlete and prom king, regarded as popular with girls and a "golden child" from a conservative Christian family. Describing himself as "a pile of contradictions", for the past several years he has questioned his sexual orientation and recently came out as bisexual, causing conflict with some of his loved ones. He came to D.C. to be an environmentalist, but unexpectedly became an activist for LGBT rights as well, working for the Human Rights Campaign and the Energy Action Coalition. MTV indicates that his time in D.C. will mark a turning point for him and the question of whether his family will accept his sexuality. Like Ashley, he goes to church every Sunday, providing common ground through which he hopes to bond with her when they first meet in the premiere, though he also sees local men, and pines for Tanner, his ex-boyfriend back home. He has a brother named Jonathan and a sister named Alyssa. His father, Mike Sr., visits in Episode 14. Although he is bisexual, he explains in the reunion show that he predominantly saw men during his time in the house because bringing men back home is not something he was previously able to do. He is concerned that being bisexual means his ability to one day marry the same gender "under God" may be in doubt.
Ty Ruff	22	Baltimore, Maryland
After being abandoned by his parents, Ty lived in a series of foster homes before being adopted at age five. He and his brother grew up in a neighborhood he says is accurately depicted in the TV series The Wire, which includes, for example, a former crack house across the street from his home. He describes his mother's shame when he was caught stealing as a turning point in his life, when he decided to change his ways and become the "focused, well-spoken" person he is today. Although he is grateful for what he gained during his religious upbringing in the United Church of Christ, he is now an atheist who thinks most believers in God are "narrow-minded". Described as self-reliant by MTV, he is a recent graduate of Trinity College, where he majored in economics and played football. He is also described as opinionated, and a "smooth, funny charmer", but whose temper sometimes gets the best of him. His girlfriend of three years, Lauren, broke up with him prior to filming because she could not accept his co-ed living arrangements in the Real World house, a status cemented when he informs her he has begun a sexual relationship with Emily. That relationship, however, is brief, and devolves into recurring conflict, which partially leads to a house meeting over his behavior when intoxicated. He has described encountering opposition from family members of non-African-American women he has dated in the past.

^Note 1: Age at time of filming.

== Episodes ==
No. overall	No. in season	Title	Original release date
479	1	"Looks Can Be D.C.-ving"	December 30, 2009
As the cast meets up in pairs, Mike and Ashley find they share similar religious practices, and Josh and Erika bond over their musical aspirations. The selection of bedrooms underlines political and personality differences, as well as burgeoning friendships and romantic interests. Andrew's tall tales and blunt humor gives cause for reaction from the others. Differences in religion and sexuality lead to the cast's first argument, in particular Ty, Mike and Ashley. Josh expresses a fixation with Erika, much to her appreciation.
480	2	"Bipartisan Lovin'"	January 6, 2010
Attraction and tension begins to emerge between Ty and Emily. Mike explores his attraction to both Ashley and to other men. Andrew expresses his attraction to an unreceptive Callie, and his subsequent recourse provides conflict between him and Ashley. Emily enjoys a visit from her older sister, who disapproves of Emily's lifestyle choices.
481	3	"Playboys and Proper Portions"	January 13, 2010
As Emily and Ty's relationship gets more serious, they experience conflict over relationships with other people. Callie struggles with poor body image, in part as a result of a comment by Ty.
482	4	"The Princess and the Panda"	January 20, 2010
Andrew's poor luck in finding sexual satisfaction with women continues, as does the women's amusement with his situation. Ashley and Mike's friendship continues, but an encounter with fellow patrons at a restaurant sparks an argument between them that devolves into an ongoing hostility. The arrival of gift certificates for a local sports bar leads to an awkward day out for the men.
483	5	"Love Hits a Sour Note"	January 27, 2010
Josh and his girlfriend of three years, Ashley (no relation to his housemate), exchange accusations of infidelity. Emily says her relationship with Ty is "purely physical", as she has no emotional connection to him, but Ty, who sees this as a facade, and hurtful, doesn't wish to be in such a relationship. Erika's career gets a big break.
484	6	"When Push Comes to Shove"	February 3, 2010
Callie pursues a photography internship at The Washington Blade. Mike works in gay rights advocacy with Human Rights Campaign while anticipating a visit from Tanner, his ex-boyfriend, which causes him some ambivalence as he continues to see other men. Andrew's disagreements with Ashley devolve into physical antics, including behavior on his part that causes Ashley, who recalls the violence she suffered years ago, to feel threatened.
485	7	"Bitch Begins with Bi"	February 10, 2010
Erika talks about the depression and thoughts of suicide she experienced in the past, but Ashley, who is still dealing with such issues, and lacks the familial support system Erika has, is discomforted by this, leading to a series of arguments between the two, and a threat on Erika's part to move out. As Mike continues to explore his sexuality, his local beau, Eric, expresses frustration with his bisexuality.
486	8	"Out of the Closet and Onto the Stage"	February 17, 2010
Mike meets with his Congressman, Jared Polis, who is also openly gay, to talk about his LGBT rights work. He also tries to resolve problems with Tanner, and anticipates how he will deal with his family's feelings about his sexuality when they come to a visit. Erika is troubled, first when the people she met to play with do not show up, and then by the way her distance from Ian continues to cause conflict for them. Josh forms a band, Wicked Liquid, but Erika and Emily's views of his vocals spark frustration in Erika, which Josh perceives as jealousy.
487	9	"Cheaters, Beaters and Pavement Eaters"	February 24, 2010
Andrew search for sex finally yields success, though Callie and Ashley find his regard for women distasteful. Tensions mount between Emily and a drunk Ty, leading to a shoving match, and recurring conflict. Emily helps teach poetry to a group of children at the Edmund Burke School. Josh faces his chronic infidelity, leading to a confession to his girlfriend, Ashley, and a confrontation with his housemate of the same name. An intoxicated Ty and Andrew horse around, during which Andrew falls off a balcony.
488	10	"Laughing Panda, Changing Ty"	March 3, 2010
After a stint by Andrew in the hospital, the housemates address their concern over Ty's behavior when drunk. Ty apologizes to Andrew, and agrees to quit drinking for the remainder of his time in the house, but when he begins drinking again, tensions recur between him and Emily, who tries to enact a resolution on Ty's stay in the house. On the career front, Ty interviews with the Washington Capitals, and skates with them on media day. Andrew's younger brother William visits.
489	11	"Girlfriends and Dead Ends"	March 10, 2010
Andrew's casual approach to relationships, and his distrust of women, is challenged when he develops feelings for an experienced woman he dates named Andrea. Erika expresses depression and discomfort with being in the house, and continues to search for her own niche, but after a job interview with National Public Radio, and the appearance by one of Callie's photos on the cover of The Washington Blade, she comes to an emotional decision.
490	12	"White House, Glass House"	March 17, 2010
Andrew receives career advice from Washington Post cartoonist Tom Toles, and Washington Times editor Joe Scopin, and later visits the White House with Times senior correspondent Joe Curl, where he attends a press conference with President Barack Obama. He is assigned to create a cartoon for the Times, though he has problems with deadlines. A homesick Erika enjoys a visit from her boyfriend, Ian, though her hopes that Callie would hit it off with Ian's best friend, Evan, are not fulfilled. After Erika accuses Callie of being standoffish, Erika announces she will move out. Despite skepticism from some of the cast, and her own ambivalence, she indeed moves out by the end of the episode.
491	13	"Sisterhood and Brotherly Love"	March 24, 2010
Tanner visits Mike, and after he comes out to his family, they reject him, spawning discussion among the cast about homophobia and bigotry. The cast refurbishes a soccer field for underprivileged children. The women participate in Pinktober, an annual breast cancer charity event held at the Hard Rock Cafe by the Breast Cancer Research Foundation, during which they meet performer Melissa Etheridge. Andrew and Ty join Josh at his cousin's wedding in Philadelphia, where they learn more about Josh through his relationship with his family, and Josh warns Ty about his behavior with Josh's mother. Josh's band, Wicked Liquid, plays at the Rock & Roll Hotel.
492	14	"From D.C., with Love"	March 31, 2010
Callie puts on a gallery exhibit featuring her photography, Andrew's paintings and Emily's poetry. After Mike meets with Congressman James P. Moran of Virginia, he and his father attend an HRC dinner at which President Barack Obama speaks. Andrea wants to move to Colorado to be with Andrew, who is uncertain. As the cast marches in a gay rights parade, Mike exchanges words with a man opposed to gay rights. The cast engages acts of nudity and romantic horseplay during a game of truth or dare on their last night together, before saying their good-byes the next day. Ty and Emily do their final Confessional together, in order to end their relationship on a positive note.

== After filming ==
The Real World: Washington D.C. Reunion premiered on March 31, 2010, following the season finale. It was hosted by Maria Menounos, and featured the entire cast, as they discussed the various aspects of their relationships during filming, and their lives after filming ended. Among the topics that were discussed were Andrew's continuing relationship with Andrea, who moved into a new home with him in Colorado, instances in which Ashley was perceived to be malicious, Erika's difficulties and feelings about Josh's singing, Josh's infidelity and different personas, Mike's bisexuality, and the cast's feelings about Ty's behavior when drunk.

Regarding their lives since filming, Andrew returned to school, and continued his painting while tending bar. Callie returned to school to study photography and public relations while working at a cafe. Emily returned to school, and began waitressing, while spending her free time with rock climbing, yoga, and playing on an intramural football team. She is trying her hand at social work at a refugee and immigration center, and dreams of working abroad one day. She also mentioned that she was enjoying dating women and discussed her family's reaction to her newfound bisexuality. Erika moved to Cleveland. Josh returned to Philadelphia, and continued with Wicked Liquid, which put out an EP on iTunes, and is also working on a solo project, but explains, in reference to the pain his infidelity caused his ex-girlfriend, that he is remaining single for the time being. Mike is studying part-time to be a personal trainer, and also attends Bible study. He had recently got a job as a host on a TV show. Ty returned to Baltimore, where he engages in his passions for modeling and acting, and tries to spend time with his brother, something that has been difficult to do over the past six years. Following two years of silence, Ashley and her mother reestablished their relationship.

Mike Manning went on to pursue an acting career. He appeared on Cloud 9, Hawaii Five-0, Love Is All You Need?, and produced the documentary Kidnapped for Christ.

Ashley Lindley went on to pursue an acting career with credits in a few 2011 productions, including a bit part in Birds of a Feather. In 2014, she married Daniel Shaffer and spoke up about battling a debilitating infection.

Emily Schromm, who now lives in Denver, was voted as the winner of Women's Health's America's Next Fitness Star in August 2014, and was thus featured in a series of fitness DVDs. In 2019, Schromm published her first book, titled The Process.

On August 12, 2020, Ty Ruff was arrested and booked on a DUI charge.

=== The Challenge ===
Cast member	Seasons of The Challenge	Other appearances
Andrew Woods	—N/a	—N/a
Ashley Lindley	—N/a	—N/a
Callie Walker	—N/a	—N/a
Emily Schromm	Cutthroat (2010), Battle of the Exes, Rivals II, Battle of the Eras	The Challenge: Champs vs. Stars (season 1)
Erika Lauren Wasilewski	—N/a	—N/a
Josh Colon	—N/a	—N/a
Mike Manning	—N/a	—N/a
Ty Ruff	Cutthroat (2010), Rivals, Battle of the Exes, Rivals II	—N/a
