= Love Is All You Need? (2011 film) =

- Directed by: Kim Rocco Shields
- Written by: Kim Rocco Shields; David Tillman
- Produced by: Dana Garner
- Starring: Lexi DiBenedetto; Carrie Lazar; Sheri Levy; Dante Thorn
- Cinematography: Sandra Valde-Hansen
- Production company: Wingspan Pictures
- Release date: March 24, 2011
- Running time: 17 minutes
- Language: English

Love Is All You Need? is a 2011 short film, directed by Kim Rocco Shields with Lexi DiBenedetto serving as the protagonist and narrator. The plot of the story takes place in a reversed society where homosexuality is the social norm and heterosexuality is considered taboo. In 2014, it was announced that the short would be adapted into a feature film, with Shields returning as the director and writer with some of the original cast returning. In 2016 the adapted film was released on iTunes, in which Lexi DiBennedetto, star of the 2011 short the film is based on, reprises her role of Ashley.

== Plot ==
Narrated by Lexi DiBenedetto, the short begins with the birth of the lead character, Ashley, her mothers, Karen (Levy) and Vicki (Lazar) at the scene. The story moves on where Ashley describes her early troubles of being an in-the-closet heterosexual. One event included a church sermon that rejected opposite-sex relationships except for reproduction; another detailed her playing house with her friends in which Ashley was met with hostility after suggesting a heterosexual fake marriage for the game.

Ashley experiences several other events during her life. Her parents are unsupportive of heterosexuality, not knowing that their daughter is heterosexual, using heterophobic slurs like "breeder" and requesting that their children walk a different route to school after a straight couple move into their neighborhood. At school, she experiences physical and emotional bullying after it is discovered she is in a relationship with a male classmate (Dante Thorn). Upon being found out the classmate (Dante Thorn) denies their relationship in fear of being bullied by his older brother and peers at school. Later, his older brother and his companions physically attack Ashley and one of her own friends writes hetero on her forehead. Upon arriving home, her parents have received a phone call about their daughter's sexual orientation. Vicki proceeds to instruct Ashley to "march upstairs and get cleaned up". Karen, unlike her wife, disagrees, causing the two women to argue. Ashley begins to clean the marker from her face in the bathroom, where she later becomes overcome with emotion and decides to commit suicide due to the stress and violence her peers and parents put her through. As she bleeds from a self-inflicted wound, she continues to receive hateful text messages on her phone. At the end, Karen and Vicki eventually try to comfort Ashley through the door only to be met with silence, in fear they burst through the locked bathroom door to find Ashley's lifeless body.

== Reception ==
Love Is All You Need? received mostly positive reviews. Film critic Jodie Mullen gave a positive review, writing that the story was "truly inspirational". After viewing Love is All You Need? at the 2011 Atlanta Film Festival, Larry McGillicuddy wrote the film was "an incredibly powerful statement against bigotry, bullying, and oppression."

== Feature film ==
After it was announced that the short would be adapted into a full-length movie, an additional story line was included, revolving around a female football player who enters a relationship with a male journalist. The film also includes Ashley's story and DiBennedetto reprises her role. Levy and Lazar also appear as a nurse and a "Female Commentator", respectively. Additional cast members include Elisabeth Röhm, Emily Osment, Mike Manning and Jeremy Sisto.

== Impact ==
The film's director, Kim Rocco Shields, states that her mission as a filmmaker is “to create a body of work that will create social change.”

By 2016, Love Is All You Need? had garnered 30 million views on YouTube and Facebook. The film has since been used as an anti-bullying tool in United States schools. Gail Rolf, education director of Friends of Project 10, has stated that “we need dialogue, we need education, and we need to talk about these issues of those who are stigmatized and victimized because of who they are”. The film has been translated into 15 different languages.
