= Prescience (film) =

2019 American drama film

- Theatrical film poster
- Directed by: James Helsing
- Written by: Tyler Frech; James Helsing; Lashawn Williams
- Produced by: René Mena; Lashawn Williams
- Starring: René Mena; Mike Manning; Linda Gray; Eric Roberts
- Cinematography: Jacob Kiesling
- Edited by: Javier Dampierre
- Music by: Marcos Cruz Lloréns
- Release dates: April 23, 2019 (Richmond); October 8, 2019 (USA)
- Running time: 90 minutes
- Country: United States
- Languages: English; Spanish

Prescience (a.k.a. Intuitions) is a 2019 American LGBTQ+ drama film, directed by James Helsing, who co-wrote along with Tyler Frech and Lashawn Williams. The film stars René Mena, Mike Manning, Linda Gray, and Eric Roberts. It premiered at the Richmond International Film Festival in 2019, before a streaming release later that year.

== Synopsis ==
A criminal attorney struggles with his sexuality, a cryptic new boyfriend, unemployment and the disturbing childhood secrets his parents hold.

== Cast ==
- René Mena as Isaac Smith (adult)
  - Álex González as Isaac Smith (child)
- Mike Manning as Mark
- Linda Gray as Kathryn Smith
- Eric Roberts as Mathew Smith
- Carmen Carrera as Shae
- Vanessa Vasquez as Emily Smith (adult)
  - Jyllina Skye as Emily Smith (young)
- Cary Christopher as Wyatt
- Carlos Pratts as Leo
- Paris Dylan as Ethan
- Nika Khitrova as Patricia
- Julianna Barninger as Ashley
- Lashawn Williams as James
- Monica Herman as Annie
- Christopher Kriesa as Ernie
- Raquenel as Mariana

== Reception ==
Jonathan Rizo of the Chlotrudis Society for Independent Films derided the entire film: "Unfortunately, this film is not the one to handle any of the complex issues including coming-out, immigration, sexual abuse, double-lives, and well… human emotion. There's nothing really to say about this film other than it's poorly written, poorly directed, and poorly acted." Carlos Aguilar of the Los Angeles Times chided the screenplay: "Cringe-worthy lines of dialogue share the movie's soundscape with an overbearing score as the ensemble trots through woefully uninspired flashbacks and erotic dream sequences."

Marlon Wallace of WBOC-TV took issue with the pacing: "It all goes by so fast that it doesn't feel like we have time to absorb anything and really delve into it, so that it has an impact. The film goes from child molestation, to rape, to homophobia, to domestic abuse, to xenophobia, to drug cartels, to immigration, to adultery and to possible murder. There's actually enough here for Helsing, if he wanted to do a film trilogy. That's if he did three properly paced films, not the rush job with which this film was done."
