= Voicemails for Isabelle =

2026 film by Leah McKendrick

- Release poster
- Directed by: Leah McKendrick
- Written by: Leah McKendrick
- Produced by: Todd Black; Becky Sanderman; Jason Blumenthal; Steve Tisch
- Starring: Zoey Deutch; Nick Robinson; Ciara Bravo; Harry Shum Jr.; Lukas Gage; Toby Sandeman; Nick Offerman
- Cinematography: Julia Swain
- Edited by: Lee Haxall; Ryan C. Fill
- Music by: Este Haim; Amanda Yamate
- Production companies: Sony Pictures; Escape Artists
- Distributed by: Netflix
- Release date: June 19, 2026
- Running time: 118 minutes
- Country: United States
- Language: English

Voicemails for Isabelle is a 2026 American romantic comedy-drama film written and directed by Leah McKendrick and starring Zoey Deutch and Nick Robinson.

The plot follows Jill who, to cope with the loss of her sister Isabelle, begins leaving voicemails on Isabelle's phone number. Unbeknownst to her, the number has been reassigned to a man named Wes, who begins to fall in love with Jill.

The film was released on Netflix on June 19, 2026, and received generally positive reviews from critics.

== Plot ==
Jill is an aspiring baker living in San Francisco and working under the demanding and abusive Chef Bastien. She regularly relates her life to her sister Isabelle, a longtime cystic fibrosis patient who lives back home in Austin, over the phone. After Isabelle's death, Jill starts leaving voicemails on her number, unaware that it has been reassigned to Austin-based real estate agent Wes.

Wes becomes invested in Jill's life. He learns about her dates with her co-worker Arthur and dating podcaster Tyler, and her desire to become a baker. Wes eventually realizes Isabelle is dead, but continues to fixate on Jill, against the advice of his engaged friends Andy and Breeda.

After Tyler ghosts her, Jill crashes a live taping of his podcast, calling him out. Wes, who convinced his boss to send him on a work trip to San Francisco, also attends the event and follows her out. He finds and meets Jill at her usual spot overlooking the Golden Gate Bridge. Invoking their shared Texas backgrounds, Wes invites her for tacos, and they bond. Jill agrees to show him around San Francisco.

On a tour bus, Jill tells Wes that she is unsure of her career. After the guide quits he takes over, entertaining the riders, and encourages and serenades Jill. Wes is kicked off the bus, but she steps off and kisses him. Jill makes him dinner, including a chicken pot pie in the style of his mother's which makes him emotional, and confides that she learned to cook while keeping her sick sister company at home. A conflicted Wes fails to tell Jill about the voicemails.

Wes brings Jill as his date to Breeda and Andy's wedding. At the reception, she tries to leave a voicemail for Isabelle, but realizes Wes's phone is receiving the call. Disgusted, she confronts him and leaves. Jill is devastated to lose the voicemails after a software update.

Bastien promotes Arthur to baker despite turning in a raw souffle, causing Jill to fly into a rage and quit. Her parents visit for her birthday and gift her Isabelle's college fund, which she uses to start a dessert taco food truck named Jill and Izzy's. To her surprise, her former co-worker Zella arrives and helps steer the opening to success.

Breeda updates Wes on Jill's new business. He tries to convince his hacker co-worker Felix to retrieve Jill's voicemails. On New Year's Eve, Wes leaves Jill a voicemail explaining that he has changed his work line and paid for Isabelle's old number until the end of the next year so she can continue to speak to it.

Wes invites Jill to meet him at their favorite taco restaurant, José's. Visiting her parents, Jill is elated to discover that the voicemails have returned to her phone. With Breeda and Andy's encouragement, Wes rushes through the streets and is pleased to find Jill at José's. They reconcile and kiss.

Later, as Jill and Zella serve their dessert nachos in a San Francisco park, Wes calls Isabelle's number and asks for her blessing in form of a sign for he and Jill to move in together. Simultaneously, Jill calls the number and says it will be her last voicemail, as she thinks she will be okay. Suddenly, the DJ plays Robyn's "Dancing on My Own", Jill and Isabelle's favorite song. Wes takes this as a sign and they dance to the song together.

== Cast ==
- Zoey Deutch as Jill Shaw, an Austin-raised prep cook, now living in the culinary mecca of San Francisco, who's an aspiring baker and the older sister of Isabelle
  - Alice Comer as young Jill
- Nick Robinson as Wes, a commercial real estate agent
- Ciara Bravo as Isabelle Shaw, Jill's late sister who has cystic fibrosis
  - Iris Everly as young Isabelle
- Harry Shum Jr. as Andy, Wes' friend and the soon-to-be husband of Breeda
- Lukas Gage as Arthur, a prep cook and Jill's co-worker
- Toby Sandeman as Tyler, a popular dating podcaster
- Nick Offerman as Chef Bastien, a popular baker in San Francisco and Jill's boss
- Megan Danso as Zella, a fellow prep cook and co-worker of Jill
- Gil Bellows as Jill and Isabelle's dad (Mr. Shaw)
- Tanis Dolman as Jill and Isabelle's mom (Mrs. Shaw)
- Spencer Lord as Scott, a guy with pink eye that Jill goes out on a date with

In addition, the film's writer and director, Leah McKendrick, appears as Breeda, a fellow friend of Wes and Andy's bride-to-be.

== Production ==
Voicemails for Isabelle was originally announced in 2019 with Hailee Steinfeld playing the lead, Sharon Maguire directing, and Sony producing. In May 2025, it was announced that Leah McKendrick would be taking over as both director and writer and that the film would be released by Netflix. In addition, it was also announced that Zoey Deutch will be replacing Steinfeld as the female lead, with Nick Robinson joining her as the male lead. Principal photography began in July 2025, in Vancouver, Canada. Nick Offerman, Lukas Gage, Harry Shum Jr., Ciara Bravo, Spencer Lord, Tanis Dolman, and Gil Bellows rounded out the cast in August 2025.

== Release ==
Voicemails for Isabelle was released on Netflix on June 19, 2026.

== Reception ==
On the review aggregator website Rotten Tomatoes, 88% of 60 critics' reviews are positive, with an average rating of 6.7/10. The website's consensus reads: "Voicemails for Isabelle succeeds by grounding its romance in authentic emotion and character-driven humor, with compelling performances that make its bittersweet story as heartfelt as it is funny." Metacritic, which uses a weighted average, assigned the film a score of 62 out of 100, based on 12 critics, indicating "generally favorable" reviews.
