= Laura Cerón =

American actress

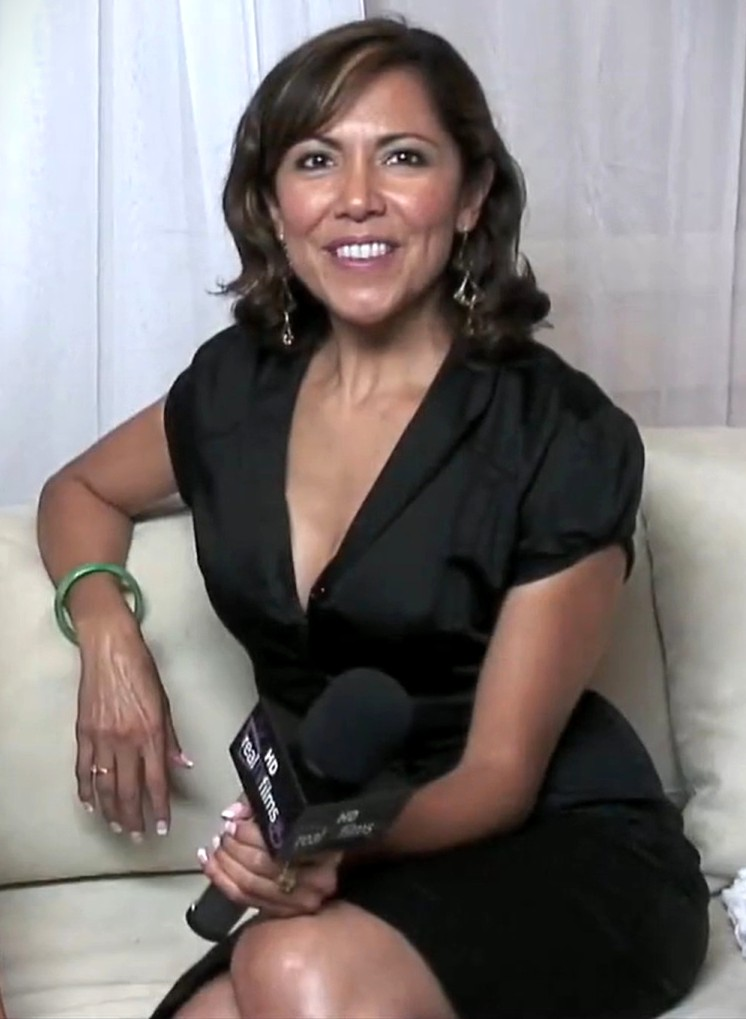
- Cerón in 2009
- Born: September 28, 1964 (age 61); Mexico City, Mexico
- Occupation: Actress
- Years active: 1986–present

Laura Cerón (born September 28, 1964) is an American actress. Her most recognizable role is that of Nurse Chuny Marquez on the television series ER.

== Early life ==
Cerón was born in Mexico City, Mexico. She moved to Elgin, Illinois at the age of 10. She is the third oldest of two brothers and three sisters. In junior high school she became involved with theater. After leaving high school she joined the Latino Chicago Theater Company and went on to become one of their leading actresses. She has performed in dozens of plays, including Each Day Dies With Sleep, Heroes and Saints, and Federico García Lorca's Once Five Years Pass.

== Career ==
Cerón's first film appearance was in the 1992 movie The Public Eye, starring Joe Pesci. This was followed by a small part in the 1995 movie Losing Isaiah. After playing the recurring role of Anita Marrón on the short-lived 1993–1994 ABC drama Missing Persons, Cerón joined the supporting cast of the NBC drama ER in 1995, near the end of its first season. Cerón was one of only six actors to appear in every season of ER until the final episode in April 2009. She guest-starred in Strong Medicine in 2004. In 2009, she starred in the fifth installment of Bring It On alongside Christina Milian.

== Filmography ==
Film
Year	Film	Role	Notes
1992	The Public Eye	Puerto Rican Woman	Film Debut
1995	Losing Isaiah	NICU Woman	
1996	The Big Squeeze	Letter Carrier	
2000	Details	Dr. Diaz	
2002	King Rikki	Emalita Ortega	
2004	Criminals	Waitress	
2006	Broken Circle	Sgt. Campos	
2007	Rails & Ties	Susan Garcia	
2007	MaNiC	OBGYN	
2008	Oh Baby!	Betty	
2009	Bring It On: Fight to the Finish	Isabel	Direct-to-DVD
2010	Political Disasters	Lenora	
2010	Flights of Fancy	María Luisa Saca	
2011	The Perfect Family	Carmelita	
2023	Scrambled		
Television
Year	Title	Role	Notes
1993–1994	Missing Persons	Anita Marrón	Recurring role
1995–2009	ER	Nurse Chuny Marquez	
2001	Touched by an Angel	Lorena Acosta	1 episode
2002	The Brothers Garcia	Alena	1 episode
2003	Luis	Unknown Role	1 episode
2003	Judging Amy	Alma Zapata	1 episode
2004	Strong Medicine	Taryn	1 episode
2008	The Unit	Ana Rocha	1 episode
2009	CSI: Miami	DeeDee Curson	1 episode
2010	Saving Grace	Caroline	
2016–2018	Shameless	Celia Delgado	6 episodes
2018	The Big Bang Theory	Marta	1 episode
2020	Station 19	Tia Sandra / Sandra Alvarez	3 episodes
2021	Firefly Lane	Isabel Brody	1 episode

== Awards and nominations ==
Year	Group	Award	Result	Film/Show
1998	ALMA Award	Outstanding Actress in a Drama Series	Nominated	ER
1999	ALMA Award	Outstanding Actress in a Drama Series	Nominated	ER
2000	ALMA Award	Outstanding Actress in a Drama Series	Won	ER
2001	ALMA Award	Outstanding Actress in a Drama Series	Nominated	ER

== See also ==
- List of Mexican Americans
