= Erika Lauren Wasilewski =

American media personality

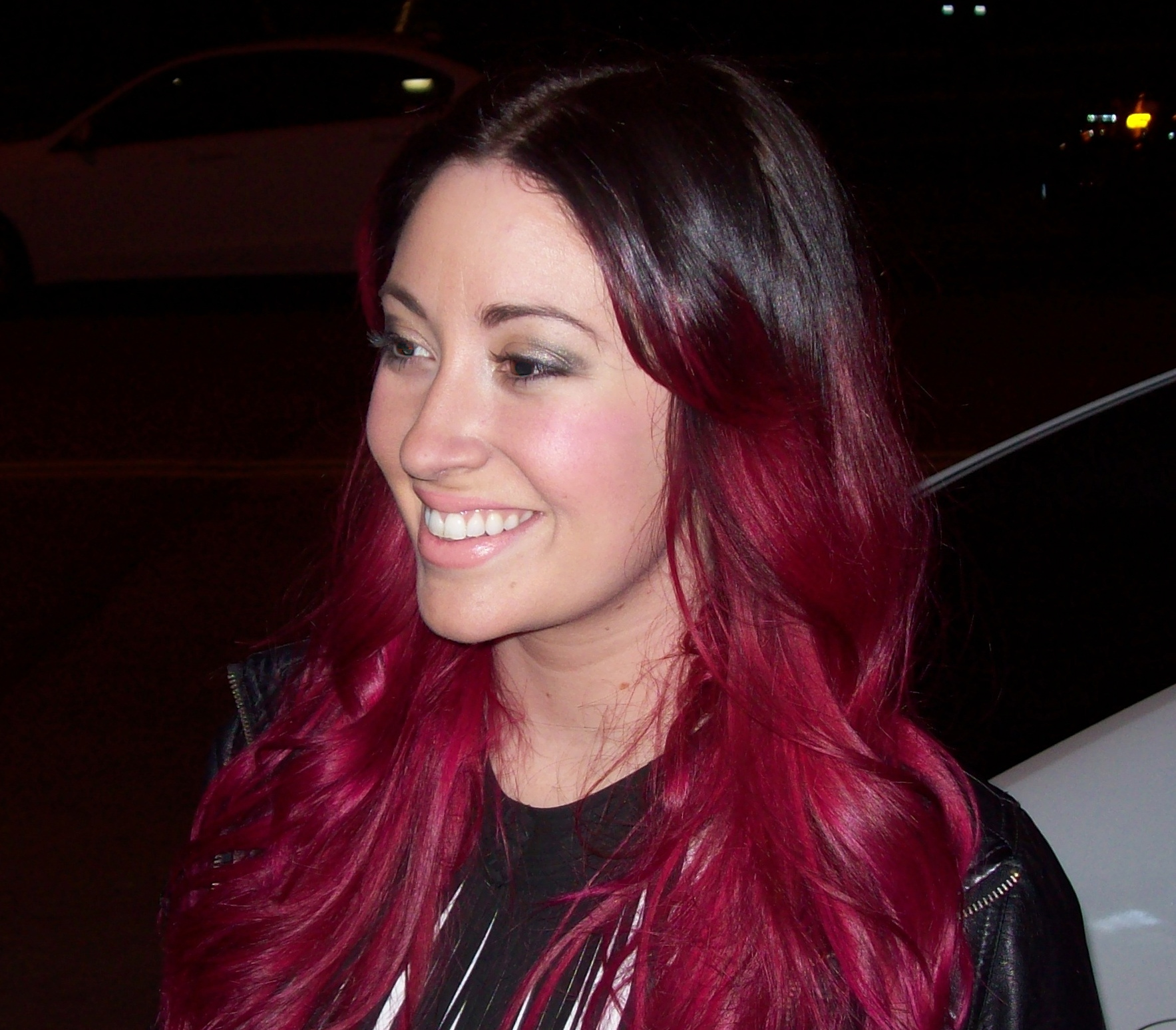
- Born: Frankfort, Illinois
- Education: Lincoln-Way East High School, Illinois State, Columbia College Chicago
- Occupations: Former reality TV participant, radio personality, singer-songwriter
- Years active: 2010–2019
- Employer: WMMS

Erika Lauren Wasilewski, known on-air simply as Erika Lauren, is a former American radio personality, singer-songwriter and former reality television personality, known as a cast member on The Real World: D.C., the 23rd season of the long-running series, which aired from 2009 to 2010. She later became a co-host on The Alan Cox Show, and as the lead singer of the band Hawkeye, released the LP Ruthless in 2013.

== Early life ==
Erika Lauren Wasilewski is originally from Frankfort, Illinois. After high school, she began studying at Illinois State University, but subsequently transferred to Columbia College Chicago to study arts entertainment and media management with the intent of working in the radio industry. Wasilewski described her formative interest in the medium, saying, "I grew up listening to WKSC-FM’s DreX in the morning. I would be laughing the whole time and thinking, Hey, I want to do that!"

== Career ==
=== Reality television ===
During her senior year, Wasilewski responded to a casting call for the 23rd season MTV reality television program The Real World, which she viewed as a way to break into the entertainment industry. In her audition video, she described herself as a "rock 'n' roll singer-songwriter with a little bit of sass." She was cast in the season, which was set in Washington D.C., and featured her living with several other cast members in a 10,800-square-foot house in Dupont Circle for three months in 2009.

MTV's biographical information for her described her as a singer/songwriter who enjoyed being the center of attention, both professionally and personally. She was also indicated to be a guitarist. Her bio also stated that she had a history of childhood loneliness and depression, and that her lingering need for affection was evident in her relationship with her boyfriend Ian, from whom separation was difficult during her time in Washington. In the premiere episode, she was indicated to be in a group called Hawkeye.

However, from the beginning of filming, Wasilewski found the experience to be more difficult than she had anticipated. During the course of the season, she expressed frustration and discomfort in regard to her musical plans, her recurring depression, and her presence in the house, and eventually moved out in Episode 12. She later described her exit from the show with a laugh, saying, "I'm sometimes known as the girl who cried all the time on the show. There's no way to prepare for that invasion of privacy."

=== Radio and music ===
Wasilewski served as a co-host on The Alan Cox Show, an afternoon drive hot talk program on Cleveland rock station WMMS (100.7 FM).

During her time as the lead singer of the now-defunct band Hawkeye, the band released its debut LP Ruthless on July 16, 2013. Wasilewski was also a member of the cover band Pop Vulture.

== Personal life ==
=== Falsifying cancer diagnosis ===
In July 2009, Shabooty reported that Wasilewski falsely claimed to have been diagnosed with cancer following a breakup with her boyfriend, as a plea for attention, and according to her ex-boyfriend Billy, spent nine months maintaining this lie. When interviewed by TimeOut, Wasilewski confirmed the report, saying, "Um, there is some truth to what you're hearing. Yes, it happened. Yes, I regret it. If I could take it back, I would. I was going through some severe emotional problems at the time. I was lashing out and craving attention wherever I could."

=== POTS diagnosis ===
In 2018, Wasilewski revealed she was diagnosed with postural orthostatic tachycardia syndrome, or POTS, after which she was absent from her position at WMMS for several months.
