= M.F.A. (film) =

- Theatrical release poster
- Directed by: Natalia Leite
- Written by: Leah McKendrick
- Produced by: Mike Manning; Leah McKendrick; Shintaro Shimosawa
- Starring: Francesca Eastwood; Clifton Collins Jr. Leah McKendrick; Peter Vack; David Huynh; Marlon Young; David Sullivan; Michael Welch; Mike Manning
- Cinematography: Aaron Kovalchik
- Edited by: Phil Bucci
- Music by: Sonya Belousova
- Production companies: GTE Productions; Syncretic Entertainment; Villainess Productions
- Distributed by: Dark Sky Films
- Release dates: March 13, 2017 (SXSW); October 13, 2017 (United States)
- Running time: 93 minutes
- Country: United States
- Language: English
- Budget: $250,000

M.F.A. is a 2017 American thriller film directed by Natalia Leite and written by Leah McKendrick. The film stars Francesca Eastwood, Clifton Collins Jr., Leah McKendrick, Peter Vack, David Huynh, Marlon Young, David Sullivan, Michael Welch and Mike Manning. The film was released on October 13, 2017, by Dark Sky Films.

== Plot ==
Noelle, an introvert California Masters of Fine Arts graduate student, accepts an invitation to a party by a handsome classmate she has a crush on, only to be lured into his room where he rapes her. The following night Noelle confronts her rapist and in a moment of rage, accidentally kills him. But, much to her surprise, an unexpected surge of inspiration will gradually fuel both her stagnant artistic expression and her thirst for revenge on those who have assaulted women. Now, Noelle becomes a pitiless vigilante who uses her newly-found sex-appeal to serve her cause.

== Cast ==
- Francesca Eastwood as Noelle
- Clifton Collins Jr. as Kennedy
- Leah McKendrick as Skye
- Peter Vack as Luke
- David Huynh as Shane
- Marlon Young as Professor Rudd
- David Sullivan as Cavanaugh
- Michael Welch as Mason
- Mike Manning as Jeremiah
- Andrew Caldwell as Ryder
- Kyler Pettis as Conor

== Production ==
According to writer-producer Leah McKendrick, she began writing the screenplay for the film in 2014 and shooting began in 2016 at Chapman University, her alma mater.

== Release ==
The film premiered at South by Southwest on March 13, 2017. On June 8, 2017, Dark Sky Films acquired distribution rights to the film. The film was released on October 13, 2017, by Dark Sky Films.

== Critical reception ==
Rotten Tomatoes reported an 80% approval rating, based on 25 reviews, with an average score of 6.8/10.

The Hollywood Reporter staff said the film was "less a pulse-pounding thriller than a conversation starter about injustice and vigilantism." Leah Pickett of the Chicago Reader praised Francesca Eastwood's performance, calling it "magnetic and convincing", but criticizing the character's "implausibly quick switch from wallflower to assassin."
