= List of Girl Meets World characters =

Girl Meets World is an American comedy television series created by Michael Jacobs and April Kelly that premiered on Disney Channel on June 27, 2014. The series ran for three seasons, consisting of 72 episodes, and concluded on January 20, 2017. The series is a spinoff of Boy Meets World and stars Rowan Blanchard, Ben Savage, Sabrina Carpenter, Peyton Meyer, August Maturo, Danielle Fishel, and Corey Fogelmanis.

The series centers around the life of Riley and her friends and family, particularly their school life, in which Cory is their history teacher. Riley shares a strong relationship with her best friend Maya Hart, who assists her in learning to cope with social and personal issues of adolescence. Several Boy Meets World cast members reprise their roles in the series.

== Main ==
The main characters. From left to right: Lucas, Auggie, Topanga, Riley, Cory, Maya, and Farkle.

=== Riley Matthews ===
Riley Matthews (Rowan Blanchard) is the daughter of Cory and Topanga Matthews, and has a younger brother named Auggie.

At the start of the series, Riley is 12 years old and in seventh grade. She and her best friend, Maya Hart, explore school and life together while making new friends along the way. She and Maya are in middle school for the first two seasons and then high school for the third season. Riley is usually very optimistic and cheerful about life, and generally has faith in almost everyone. She also has a very silly and quirky personality, much like her father and to an extent, her mother. She is often portrayed as being very ditzy and innocent of the world around her.

In the pilot episode, Riley develops a crush on Lucas Friar, whom she met on the subway on the way to school; he later becomes her classmate in Cory's history class. They go out on a date for the first time in "Girl Meets First Date". During season two, Riley and Maya discover that they both like Lucas and he also likes the two of them, but Maya encourages Lucas to choose Riley in the season three, two-part episode "Girl Meets Ski Lodge", and he does.

Riley is periodically portrayed by Lindsey Lamer in flashbacks to her childhood with Maya, and as an adult in one episode by Mariah Buzolin.

=== Cory Matthews ===
Cory Matthews (Ben Savage) is Riley and Auggie's father and Topanga's husband. He has taken a job as a history teacher at John Quincy Adams Middle School for the first two seasons and then Abigail Adams High School in the third season. In both settings, his class consists of his daughter and her friends, and his history lessons relate to their lives, becoming life lessons for them. In addition to being Riley's father, he often acts as a father figure to Maya. He also acts as a mentor to his students, much like Mr. Feeny was to Cory, Topanga, and Shawn in Boy Meets World.

=== Maya Hart ===
Maya Hart (Sabrina Carpenter) is Riley's best friend. Maya was raised in a single-parent household by her mother Katy; she is tomboyish, social and street smart, but has a troubled past rooted in the fact that her father Kermit abandoned her and Katy before Maya turned five. Consequently, Maya is wild and rebellious as evidenced by her actions, such as protesting homework and almost lighting a class assignment on fire, but her friendship with Riley and the Matthews family keeps her grounded most of the time.

In the second season three-part episode "Girl Meets Texas", Maya is shown to have deeper feelings for Lucas than she normally lets on. Riley notices Maya's feelings and decides to step back from Lucas and let Maya start a relationship with him, which turns out to be awkward. In season 3, Maya goes through an identity crisis stemming from the fact that she loves Riley so much that Maya was influenced by her, which turned out to be an underlying reason why she liked Lucas. After Riley helped bring Maya back to her true self, she realized that she does not like Lucas the same way Riley does, and that she became like Riley to protect her and to find out if Lucas was right for her. After this she put her full support behind Riley and Lucas as a couple.

Beginning in the first season, Maya develops a crush on Cory's younger brother Joshua. He downplays it as a schoolgirl crush until season 3 when, in the two-parter "Girl Meets Ski Lodge", Maya tells him she genuinely likes him, and he finally admits he has feelings for her as well; he tells her that there is a chance for them and that he is willing to play the long game and see what happens. In the third season, after her mother Katy marries Shawn Hunter, Shawn presents Maya with adoption papers, and Maya accepts, proclaiming herself as Maya Hunter.

Maya is periodically portrayed by Ivy George in flashbacks to Maya and Riley's childhood, and as an adult in one episode by Ruby Lewis.

=== Lucas Friar ===
Lucas Friar (Peyton Meyer) is another member of the group and at first was both Riley and Maya's love interest until Maya decided Riley and Lucas were good for one another. He is Riley's boyfriend.

Originally from Austin, Texas, Lucas has gentlemanly manners and common sense, and has shown to be the protector of the group as he is fearless and unstoppable when defending his friends. Because of his Texas upbringing, Maya often addresses Lucas stereotypically calling him derisive but good-natured names like "Huckleberry", "Ranger Rick" and "Bucky McBoingboing"; in "Girl Meets 1961" Lucas finds out that he is from a family of cowboys and had a great grandfather who had a brief career as a musician. In "Girl Meets the Secret of Life", it is revealed that Lucas is a year older than his classmates, and his father was transferred to New York giving Lucas a fresh start. He had been expelled from his former school in Austin. The reason for his expulsion involved sticking up for his friend Zay Babineaux after he got into trouble with some students. During season two, Riley and Maya discover that they both like Lucas and he also likes the two of them, but Riley is Lucas' choice in season three's two-part episode "Girl Meets Ski Lodge".

=== Auggie Matthews ===
Auggie Matthews (August Maturo) is Riley's precocious younger brother and Cory and Topanga's son. Auggie is very attached to his parents and sister, and wants to be like his father when he grows up. His neighbor, Ava Morgenstern, becomes Auggie's girlfriend.

=== Topanga Matthews ===
Topanga Matthews (Danielle Fishel) is Riley and Auggie's mother and Cory's wife. Topanga is Cory's high school girlfriend and they have been friends since they were babies. Topanga has become a successful lawyer and is a loving and protective mother as shown in "Girl Meets Sneak Attack". She later inherits Svorski's from the late Mrs. Svorski, later changing the bakery's name to Topanga's.

=== Farkle Minkus ===
Farkle Minkus (Corey Fogelmanis) is close friends with Riley and Maya, but is also infatuated with both of them. In "Girl Meets Sneak Attack", it is shown that he cares for the two and will do anything for them to be happy. He is smart, eccentric, and a big flirt. He is shown to be the teacher's pet in many episodes. He is the son of Cory and Topanga's former classmates, Stuart Minkus and Jennifer Bassett; of the two, Farkle bears great similarities to his father.

Farkle cares a great deal about his education and always keeps his grades up in class. In the season two episode "Girl Meets I Am Farkle", his IQ score is found to be exceptionally high, so his guidance counselor has him take a series of tests to find out whether or not he has Asperger's syndrome, which he and his friends are relieved to find that he does not. In this same episode he begins a relationship with his former arch-nemesis, Isadora Smackle, who reveals she was diagnosed with Asperger's at age five.

== Recurring ==
=== Evelyn Rand ===
Evelyn Rand (Jackée Harry) meets Riley and Maya on the subway in the pilot; they later call her Crazy Hat because of the obscure hats they see her wearing at the subway station. She is revealed to be a successful businesswoman.

=== Ava Morgenstern ===
Ava Morgenstern (Ava Kolker) is Auggie's girlfriend. Being slightly older, she manipulates Auggie into doing whatever she wants, remaining oblivious to how this affects him. Ava's personality appears to be a product of her mom's way of raising her. Early on, Topanga makes it clear that she does not like Ava, but in the season 2 episode "Girl Meets STEM", she takes Ava's side: Ava is furious when she and Auggie get exactly the same trophy after Ava singlehandedly defeats Auggie's soccer team 29-0. In the season 3 premiere "Girl Meets High School: Part One", Ava comes to Cory, Topanga, and Auggie when her parents are splitting up.

=== Smackle ===
Isadora Smackle (Cecilia Balagot) is Farkle's arch-rival. In "Girl Meets I Am Farkle", it is revealed that she was diagnosed with Asperger's syndrome when she was five years old. By the start of "Girl Meets High School, Part 1", she has joined the others at Abigail Adams High School, having become Farkle's girlfriend and becoming closer with Riley, Maya, Lucas and Zay.

=== Katy Hart ===
Katy Hart (Cheryl Texiera) is Maya's mom. For Career Day at school, Katy reveals to Maya's class that though she works as a waitress she aspires to be an actress. Katy frequently fails to show up to any event of importance to Maya, believing herself to be a hindrance to her daughter's future. Her relationship with Maya is strained at first, reminiscent to that of Shawn and Chet Hunter from Boy Meets World, but they become much closer after Shawn reveals to Maya in "Girl Meets Master Plan" that Maya's father deserting her family was not Katy's fault; Katy maintained the story that she drove him away believing that a girl should think well of her father. As the series progresses, Katy becomes a manager for Topanga's bakery. After meeting Shawn, she develops feelings for him. The two get engaged in "Girl Meets Upstate" and subsequently wed in "Girl Meets I Do".

=== Ms. Kossal ===
Gabriella Kossal (Aisha Kabia) is the art teacher at John Quincy Adams Middle School who is impressed with Maya's art.

=== Dewey/Doy ===
Dewey/Doy (Note: Credited as Dewey in "Girl Meets the New World", and Doy in subsequent episodes.) (Cooper Friedman) is a friend of Auggie who pronounces his name "Doy" much to the annoyance of Topanga. He does not like his name and cries each time somebody corrects his pronunciation.

=== Zay Babineaux ===
Isaiah "Zay" Babineaux (Amir Mitchell-Townes) is Lucas' old friend from Texas who later moves to New York and enrolls at John Quincy Adams Middle School, who gradually befriends Riley, Maya and Farkle as he gets to know them better and eventually becomes the 5th member of the core group (even getting to take Maya on dates). He fancies himself a smooth talker, but his words and actions more often get him into trouble rather than out of it. When Zay and Lucas were classmates at their old school in Texas, Lucas was usually the one who bailed him out. Eventually, one of these situations caused Lucas to be expelled from his old school.

=== Charlie Gardner ===
Charlie Gardner (Tanner Buchanan) is a student at John Quincy Adams Middle School who admires Riley. In "Girl Meets Semi-Formal", he asked Riley to the semi-formal, right before Lucas was going to.

=== Sarah ===
Sarah (Sarah Carpenter) is a classmate of Riley and Maya at both John Quincy Adams Middle School and Abigail Adams High School. She mostly serves as a background character in many episodes, but achieves prominence in "Girl Meets Hollyworld" as a screenplay writer for a movie her father, the director DW Preminger, is casting. The episode "Girl Meets Commonism" shows her on the honor board panel and reveals her last name to be Carpenter.

== Boy Meets World alumni ==
The following characters from Boy Meets World make appearances in the series in the form of recurring roles, guest appearances, or cameo appearances. They are listed in order of appearance:

=== Mr. Feeny ===
George Feeny (William Daniels) is Cory's omnipresent mentor who is now in his late 80s. Feeny makes a cameo appearance in the pilot episode, his only appearance in the first season. Mr. Feeny was Cory, Shawn, and Topanga's teacher in junior high, their principal in high school, and their professor in college. Throughout these years, Feeny was the Matthews' next-door neighbor and a close friend to the Matthews family as well as Shawn Hunter. In "Girl Meets Gravity", Cory calls Feeny to check up on him after the death of Mrs. Svorski. In "Girl Meets Pluto", Cory, Shawn, and Topanga, along with Riley and Maya, return to Philadelphia to dig up a time capsule from Feeny's backyard where they are caught by Feeny. He asks Riley and Maya how Cory has been to them as he receives some positive answers. He returns in the season three episode "Girl Meets I Do" where he comes to New York to wed Shawn and Katy. He returned in the series finale.

=== Minkus ===
Stuart Minkus (Lee Norris) is Cory, Shawn, and Topanga's former classmate, appearing as a main cast member in the first season of Boy Meets World, and as a guest star in an episode of the fifth season. Although Cory and Shawn often bullied Minkus, the boys also looked to him for advice on girls and life, and Stuart was good friends with Topanga, later becoming a fierce rival, which carries over to this series. Making his return in "Girl Meets Maya's Mother", it is revealed that he is Farkle's father. He appears at Career Day at school, whereupon he instantly renews his rivalry with both Cory and Topanga, and is proud to mention his position as the CEO of Minkus International. In "Girl Meets I Am Farkle", it is revealed that Stuart is married to Jennifer Bassett, an ex-girlfriend of Shawn's. He returned in the series finale.

=== Harley Keiner ===
Harley Keiner (Danny McNulty) is Cory's good friend and former high school bully. In Boy Meets World, Harley was much older than the rest of the students due to being held back. He now works as the janitor at John Quincy Adams Middle School, as seen in "Girl Meets the Forgotten". He mentions in "Girl Meets Flaws" that Cory helped him get the job. Reminiscent of the original series, Harley likes to address Cory by the nickname Johnny Baboon. Harley is regretful for his past behavior and looks to steer kids from going down the wrong path. However, it is mildly implied that Harley's aggressive side isn't entirely gone as he mentions that without music, he is prone to do things. He returned in the series finale.

=== Alan Matthews ===
Alan Matthews (William Russ) is Cory, Eric, Joshua, and Morgan's father, Topanga's father-in-law, and Riley and Auggie's grandfather. Alan has a close relationship with Cory and owns a wilderness store which he originally ran with his eldest son Eric in Boy Meets World. He appeared along with his wife Amy and younger son Joshua in "Girl Meets Home for the Holidays". He returned in the series finale.

=== Amy Matthews ===
Amy Matthews (Betsy Randle) is Cory, Eric, Joshua, and Morgan's mother, Topanga's mother-in-law, and Riley and Auggie's grandmother. Amy has a close relationship with her children, especially Morgan, who is her only daughter. She would often disagree with Cory and Topanga as a couple when they made important decisions even though she is fond of them. She appeared along with her husband Alan and younger son Joshua in "Girl Meets Home for the Holidays". She returned in the series finale.

=== Joshua Matthews ===
Joshua Matthews (Uriah Shelton) is Cory, Eric, and Morgan's teenage brother, and Riley and Auggie's uncle. He was born premature, underweight, and almost died just hours after his birth. He first appears with his parents in "Girl Meets Home for the Holidays", where he is 17 years old and is still living with them in Philadelphia. Maya has a major crush on him, although Joshua tries to make their three-year age difference clear to her. He visits his brother's home throughout the series, and enrolled at New York University prior to the end of season one. In the season three, two-part episode "Girl Meets Ski Lodge", he helps Cory chaperone his class's field trip. During the trip, he tells Maya that there could be a possibility for them in the future. He also appeared in "Girl Meets Bear" before returning in the series finale.

Joshua was the only member of the immediate Matthews family never to have a prominent role in Boy Meets World; he was originally portrayed by creator Michael Jacobs's son Daniel in Boy Meets World.

=== Shawn Hunter ===
Shawn Hunter (Rider Strong) is Cory's best friend since childhood, Topanga's close childhood friend, and uncle figure to Riley and Auggie. Since the end of Boy Meets World, Shawn has traveled around as a writer and a photographer. He first appears in "Girl Meets Home for the Holidays" and later forms a friendship with Maya, and develops feelings for her mother Katy. Cory and Shawn have a close relationship with each other that, as shown in Boy Meets World, is at times even stronger than the relationship between Cory and Topanga.

In the season three episode "Girl Meets Upstate", it is revealed that he has a cabin in Upstate New York. At the end of the episode, he gets engaged to Katy. In "Girl Meets I Do", Shawn gets married to Katy. In the series finale, Shawn presents Maya with adoption papers and Maya accepts.

=== Eric Matthews ===
Eric Matthews (Will Friedle) is Cory, Joshua, and Morgan's older brother, and Riley and Auggie's uncle. He first appears in "Girl Meets Mr. Squirrels". Like in the original series, Eric is a goofball and lovable, but is quite dimwitted sometimes. Now a full-grown adult, he appears to have matured a little, but is still considered to be the fun uncle in the Matthews family. As evidenced in the original series, Eric has good people skills. Since leaving Philadelphia, Eric has gone on to become the Mayor of St. Upid Town, New York, a fictional community near the borders of New York State and the Canadian Province of Quebec, after all those who would have supported his mayoral opponent died in a landslide, according to Eric.

To blend in with the locals, he wears a hermit costume, an homage to his faux alter ego, Plays with Squirrels, from the Boy Meets World episode "Seven the Hard Way". Running gags include calling Riley his "niche", referring to Auggie as his cousin, and frequently mispronouncing Maya's name. He is eventually elected senator and is later faced with a decision involving his friend, Jack Hunter. He returned in the series finale.

=== Angela Moore ===
Angela Moore (Trina McGee) is Shawn Hunter's former high school girlfriend. Angela makes an appearance in "Girl Meets Hurricane", where she not only reveals to Shawn the tragic news that her father Sgt. Moore (Julius Carry) died in a fishing accident, but also that she has gotten married to a man in the service. Her reason for meeting up with Shawn is to get some advice and counseling about her fears of becoming a mother, because she is worried that she may end up like her own mother. Shawn encourages Angela to start a family with her husband and experience the joy of being a parent. After this, Angela encourages Shawn to pursue a relationship with Katy and leaves to go back home.

=== Chet Hunter ===
Chet Hunter (Blake Clark) is Shawn and Jack's late father who died of a heart attack in the sixth season of Boy Meets World. During his lifetime, he was in and out of his children's lives. Since his passing, he occasionally returns to Shawn as a spirit guide as seen near the end of "Girl Meets Hurricane".

=== T.J. Murphy ===
Thomas Jonathan Murphy (J. B. Gaynor) was an orphan whom Eric met while he was playing Santa Claus at the mall one Christmas. After Eric gave Tommy a toy for Christmas, Tommy became convinced that Eric was really Santa Claus and asked Eric for parents for Christmas. Eric, touched by the boy's request, decided to volunteer as Tommy's big brother. The two spent a great deal of time together, leading Eric to consider adopting him, but he later changed his mind so Tommy could go live with a family who could provide better support for him.

Many years later, he resurfaces in "Girl Meets Mr. Squirrels Goes to Washington" as a political activist and founder of a website called Thorn in Your Side that reports on political scandals, with the latest one being about Senator Jefferson Davis Graham. He volunteers to help when Eric is nominated to run for senator of New York, though the others are unaware of his identity. Later, at a debate against Eric's opponent, Senator Jefferson Davis Graham, Tommy reveals his identity and speaks of Eric's compassion and how Eric had sacrificed himself for Tommy's future. Eric joyfully reunites with Tommy who expresses his desire to continue working with Eric's campaign.

=== Mr. Turner ===
Jonathan Turner (Anthony Tyler Quinn) was an English teacher who taught Cory, Shawn, and Topanga in high school. He was a laid back teacher who wore a leather jacket and rode a motorcycle. At one point, he became a father figure to Shawn and admits to loving him like a son. After his motorcycle accident, Jonathan fell in love with his nurse and married her.

Mr. Turner returns in "Girl Meets the New Teacher", where he is now a superintendent who personally hired Cory Matthews to teach history at John Quincy Adams Middle School. He is called in to oversee the class of Harper Burgess to see if she is worth keeping around after Principal Yancy threatened to fire her and Cory; like Mr. Turner in Boy Meets World, Harper uses comic books in her lessons and rides a motorcycle to work. Riley sees Mr. Turner as an uncle figure as he has formed an even closer affinity with the Matthews family than before, visiting their home often. Although thankful to him for being a good educator, Topanga holds a grudge against Turner because he gave her an A− in high school. He returned in the series finale.

=== Jack Hunter ===
Jack Hunter (Matthew Lawrence) is Shawn's paternal half-brother and was Eric's best friend in college. Jack competed with Eric for the affection of Rachel McGuire. He and Rachel joined the Peace Corps at the end of Boy Meets World, but Jack eventually left while Rachel stayed behind. The two have since lost touch, while Eric and Rachel still talk often.

Reappearing in "Girl Meets Semi-Formal", Jack now works for a corporation that is not environmentally friendly and has been assigned to persuade Senator Eric Matthews to allow his company to build a pipeline somewhere. Eric takes it upon himself to try and show Jack a simpler time to change his ways by taking him to the semi-formal dance where he meets Riley.

=== Jennifer Bassett Minkus ===
Jennifer Bassett Minkus (Kristanna Loken) was once Shawn Hunter's girlfriend back in high school. However, she was an extremely arrogant and vindictive person who tried to keep Cory and Shawn apart. She returned in "Girl Meets I Am Farkle" where it is revealed that she is married to Stuart Minkus, and is Farkle's mother. It is shown that Jennifer is a changed woman proving herself to be a sweet, caring mother of Farkle and wife of Stuart. She supports her son while waiting to find out if he is diagnosed with Asperger syndrome.

=== Morgan Matthews ===
Morgan Matthews (Lily Nicksay and Lindsay Ridgeway) is the younger sister of Cory and Eric, older sister of Joshua, and aunt of Riley and Auggie. Both actresses who played Morgan in Boy Meets World, Nicksay (who portrayed Morgan in seasons one and two) and Ridgeway (who portrayed Morgan in seasons three through seven), returned in the series finale, where both portrayed Morgan on-screen simultaneously. For example, during one scene where they were giving advice to Auggie about him being the youngest sibling, Nicksay's Morgan went first and then "tagged in" Ridgeway's Morgan to continue. They also made subtle fourth wall breaking references to Morgan's actress change in Boy Meets World. This was the character's only appearance in Girl Meets World.

== See also ==
- List of Girl Meets World episodes
