= Slapface =

2021 American horror film written and directed by Jeremiah Kipp

- Poster
- Directed by: Jeremiah Kipp
- Written by: Jeremiah Kipp
- Based on: Slapface by Jeremiah Kipp
- Produced by: Mike Manning; Artisha Mann Cooper; Joe Benedetto
- Starring: August Maturo; Mike Manning; Libe Barer; Dan Hedaya
- Cinematography: Dominick Sivilli
- Edited by: Katie Dillon
- Music by: Barry J. Neely
- Production companies: Chhibber Mann Productions; Mirror Image Films; Artman Cooper Productions
- Distributed by: Shudder; Epic Pictures Group
- Release dates: March 20, 2021 (Cinequest Film Festival); February 3, 2022 (United States)
- Running time: 85 minutes
- Country: United States
- Language: English
- Box office: $2.3 million

Slapface is a 2021 American Indie horror film written and directed by Jeremiah Kipp and produced by Mike Manning. A feature-length adaptation of Kipp's 2017 short film of the same name, it features an ensemble cast that includes Manning, August Maturo, Libe Barer, Dan Hedaya and Lukas Hassel as the film's monster.

The film premiered at the Cinequest Film Festival on March 20, 2021, where it won the Audience Award in the "Feature Thriller, Horror or Sci-Fi" category. It was released by Shudder and Epic Pictures Group in the United States on February 3, 2022.

== Plot ==
Lucas and his neglectful older brother Tom live alone in a rundown home after the death of their mother, who took them away from their abusive father. They play a "game" called Slapface, which involves them slapping each other violently in the face, and Lucas's only "friends" are Donna, Rose and Moriah, a trio of female bullies. One day, Lucas is forced by the trio to explore an abandoned house by the trio for stealing Moriah's journal, one of the bullies, who he has a crush on. He encounters a monster named Virago, and he befriends it over the course of several days.

Lucas returns to the abandoned building alone, enters but quickly gets frightened and runs off into the woods. The monster grabs him and carries him towards a lake. Lucas screams and is placed down. The two stare wordlessly off into the distance. Next the two are seen sitting in the building with a gas lamp between them. Lucas has a brief talk with his brother and later with his brothers live-in girlfriend Anna. Later, while Lucas and Moriah talk on the phone, Lucas hears a sound outside. While in bed, he overhears Tom and Anna arguing about him wandering the woods alone. Anna drives off.

Lucas returns to spend time with the monster who places something in his hand. When he leaves, a dog chases him and the monster intercepts it and kills it. After burying the dog, Lucas tries to talk with the monster. Anna catches Lucas washing the dogs blood off his hands, she and Tom try to talk with him. Both boys appear very angry that Anna left for two days. Anna suggests they seek help. Tom and she fight again and again, Anna drives away. Moriah accompanies Lucas to the abandoned house. She is scared and leaves, Lucas kisses her. The monster is watching from inside.

Monster visits the boys home and enters. Moriah and Lucas are researching the monster in the library. Anna sees a missing dog poster, and returns to talk to Tom. The monster watches her, shows itself and appears to attack. Lucas goes to find Tom, at a bar, looking for Anna. The two go looking for her. Later on a date with Moriah, Lucas hears Tom scream and runs inside their house. Lucas brutally kills a rat, upset, Moriah breaks up with him and leaves. Lucas, taking a bath is joined by the monster. After, the two are seen "playfully" destroying pictures on the walls, and then the house. Lucas gets angry when the monster is cradling and then dancing with a dress.

Tom returns home, Lucas hides the monster in the closet. They play slapface and the monster comes out, watching it appearing to feel it when Lucas is slapped. Lucas embraces Tom, professes he loves him and please stop to protect him as the monster approaches. Lucas goes to see Moriah, she won't come out. Lucas finds Anna buried in the woods after following a path of flowers. The three bullies attack Lucas but stop when they hear a roar. The twins goad Moriah into spitting on him. He runs, they chase. The girls split up, the monster appears behind her. Lucas finds her bleeding and unconscious on the ground. The twins happen upon them and run.

Tom arrives at the PD but is sent away without seeing Lucas. The sheriff talks with Lucas about the past, recalling Lucas always had a temper. Alarms sound in the PD, Lucas wanders into the hall to find everyone dead and blood everywhere. Monster is standing there. Lucas points a gun, unwilling to shoot, drops it and runs home. Lucas calls Tom, telling him to come home. Lucas, crying, asks the monster who has arrived, if she is good or evil since so many are dead. And if it's because of him. Lucas says they cannot be friends. He is hugging the monster when Tom walks in. Tom is attacked, violently being slapped until being completely knocked unconscious. Lucas fires the gun at the monster and then, stabs it. Thinking his own brother is dead, Lucas holds Tom's blood-drenched body, crying, when police enter. Lucas looks at the floor, but the monster is gone. The film ends as Lucas stares at the screen, tears streaming down his bloody smeared face.

== Cast ==
- August Maturo as Lucas
- Mike Manning as Tom
- Libe Barer as Anna
- Mirabelle Lee as Moriah
- Bianca D'Ambrosio as Donna
- Chiara D'Ambrosio as Rose
- Lukas Hassel as The Monster aka The Virago Witch
- Dan Hedaya as Sheriff John Thurston
- Alixx Schottland as Mrs. Blair
- John Backstrom as Bartender
- Mack Kuhr as Deputy Leggett
- Nick Theurer as Deputy Shepard
- Curtis Braly as Nurse
- Maha Maturo as The Mom
- Joseph DiGennaro as The Dad
- Stella Hollon-King as Little Girl
- Larry Mihlon as AirBnB Host
- Michael Thurston as AirBnB Friend
- Jason Perez as Library Worker
- Marc Abbott as Moriah's Father
- Debra Khan-Bey as Moriah's Mother
- Tim Dwyer as Twins' Dad
- Tina V. Bickmore as Doctor
- Bryan Enk as Deputy Leory
- Ilaria Malvezzi as Woman in Bar

Director Jeremiah Kipp, cinematographer Dominick Sivilli and co-executive producer Curtis Braly make cameos in the film, and real-life members of the Town of Fishkill Police Department also appear.

== Production ==
=== Development ===
An idea for the film was inspired by Kipp's childhood and love of monster movies. Dominick Sivilli suggested to make a proof-of-concept short film. The short, completed in 2017, enjoyed a two-year film festival run and its lead child actor Joshua Kaufman was nominated for Best Performance in a Short Film – Young Actor at the 39th Young Artist Awards for his performance. After the short received positive reviews, Joe Benedetto and Mike Manning agreed to acquire and green-light the feature version, with William Sadler attached to play Sheriff John Thurston. A notable change that was made during the writing of the feature version was the re-conceiving of Lucas' father in the short version into his older brother, Tom.

=== Pre-production ===
In August 2019, August Maturo was cast in the lead role of Lucas and it was announced that Lukas Hassel will reprise his role as the Monster, now called the Virago Witch, from the original short film. That same month, Manning joined the cast as Tom and was confirmed to also produce the film. In September 2019, the D'Ambrosio Twins (Bianca and Chiara) and Mirabelle Lee joined the cast as Donna, Rose and Moriah. In November 2019, Libe Barer was added to the cast as Anna, with Dan Hedaya announced to take over for Sadler in the role of Sheriff John Thurston.

=== Filming ===
The film was shot at Umbra Sound Stages in Newburgh, New York, and on location in the Hudson Valley from November 10 to December 3, 2019. The bar scenes were filmed at The Golden Rail Ale House in Newburgh.

== Music ==
Slapface (Original Motion Picture Soundtrack)

Soundtrack album by Barry J. Neely
- Released: April 6, 2021
- Genre: instrumental
- Length: 43:00
- Label: Jump The Candle
- Producer: Barry J. Neely

Barry J. Neely composed the film's score, which was released on Apple Music and Amazon Music on April 6, 2021. Curtis Braly's original song "Turn Down the Voices," which plays during the end credits and one of the bar scenes, was released as a single on February 4, 2022, the same day as its release on Shudder. About getting the opportunity to record the song for the film, Braly remarked "It was a fun challenge to dig deep inside myself to co-write and record a song that is so outside the box of anything I've done before." Jeremiah Kipp described the song as being written from "...the point of view of our main character. The effect was haunting, unsettling, emotional as Curtis leaned into the dark subtext of our narrative. When we heard his final version, chills ran down my spine."

Track listing
No.	Title	Length
1.	"Slapface"	2:28
2.	"Burying Mom"	1:14
3.	"How About a Dare?"	0:54
4.	"Dark, There's Blood on the Floor"	2:25
5.	"First She Was a Breeze"	4:02
6.	"Third Funeral"	2:48
7.	"I Have Your Gun"	6:11
8.	"Thought She Was Behind Us"	1:00
9.	"Then She Was a Tree"	1:06
10.	"Of the Poor Little Boys"	1:03
11.	"This Is Gonna Hurt"	3:03
12.	"Is She the Monster?"	2:15
13.	"Wake Up, Please"	3:07
14.	"Sometimes Really Bad Things Happen"	4:21
15.	"Virago"	6:40
Total length:		43:00

== Release ==
The film held its world premiere virtually at the Cinequest Film Festival on March 20, 2021, where it was ranked as one of the top seven trending films at the festival and the only horror film to trend. Kipp then hinted on Instagram at a later 2021 wide release in the United States.

The film also screened at Arrow Video FrightFest in the United Kingdom in August 2021. Prior to that screening, Shudder acquired the streaming distribution rights to the film in North America, the United Kingdom, Ireland, Australia, and New Zealand, with Epic Pictures Group handling worldwide sales and distribution through the "Dread" banner. This was followed by a screening at Grimfest 2021 on October 8, 2021, where August Maturo won the Reaper Award for Best Actor. It was released on Shudder on February 3, 2022 and on DVD by RLJE Films on July 26, 2022.

== Reception ==
On the review aggregator website Rotten Tomatoes, 91% of 32 critics' reviews are positive, with an average rating of 7/10. The website's consensus reads: "Slapface's uneven execution is offset by the thoughtful themes that fuel the monstrous developments in its character-driven horror story."

=== Accolades ===
Year	Award	Date of ceremony	Category	Recipient(s)	Result	Ref.
2021	Cinequest Film Festival	March 2021	Audience Award - Thriller, Horror or Sci-Fi	Slapface	Won	
2021	Grimmfest	October 2021	Reaper Award - Best Actor	August Maturo	Won	
2021	Grimmfest	October 2021	Reaper Award - Best Score	Barry J. Neely	Won	
