= August Maturo =

American child actor

- Born: August 28, 2007 (age 19); Ventura, California, U.S.
- Education: University of California, Los Angeles
- Occupation: Actor
- Years active: 2012–present
- Height: 4 ft 9 in (145 cm)
- Relatives: Blackbear (ex brother-in-law)
- Awards: See below

August Maturo (born August 28, 2007) is an American actor. He is best-known for his performance as Auggie Matthews on the Disney Channel sitcom Girl Meets World and his recurring role as the voice of Puck McSnorter in Mickey and the Roadster Racers. His notable film credits include the horror-thriller films The Nun (2018) and Slapface (2021).

== Early life ==
Maturo was born and raised in Ventura, California, where he began acting professionally at the age of 4. He began attending college in 2022 at age 14. He is of Italian and Jordanian descent.

== Career ==
From 2012 to 2014, August Maturo played little roles on TV shows like on season 8 of How I Met Your Mother, then on season 8 of "Weeds", also on "Raising Hope" season 4, and finally on "Dads" season 1.

From 2014 to 2017, Maturo starred in the Disney Channel sitcom Girl Meets World as August Matthews, the younger brother of the titular character.

In 2018, Maturo portrayed Daniel, in The Nun, a spin-off/prequel of 2016's The Conjuring 2.

In 2019, Maturo traveled to Budapest to film Shepherd: The Story of a Jewish Dog. In the film, Maturo is separated from his family during World War II and reunited with his German Shepherd who has been adopted by a Nazi SS officer at a war camp where Joshua has been taken. The movie is based on the bestselling Israeli novel "The Jewish Dog" by Asher Kravitz and has had a limited festival release starting in 2021.

In 2020, Maturo completed feature film Slapface and Short Film Boys. In Slapface, the feature-length adaptation of Jeremiah Kipp's 2017 short film of the same name, Maturo portrays Lucas, the lead in the horror-thriller and won Best Actor at Grimmfest 2021 for his role in the film. The short film Boys starring Maturo premiered at LA Shorts and has screened at many other festivals in 2021. Directed by Luke Benward, Boys has qualified to be considered for a 2022 Academy Award in the live action short category.

In 2022, Maturo executive produces a VR docu-drama feature Just Like You – Food Allergies.

== Personal life ==
Maturo is an advocate for food allergy awareness, after experiencing potentially-fatal anaphylaxis while on the set of Girl Meets World when he was six years old.

== Filmography ==
=== Film ===
Year	Title	Role	Notes	Ref(s)
2012	Applebaum	Isaac	Television film	
2018	The Nun	Daniel	Feature film acting debut	
2019	Shepherd: The Story of a Jewish Dog	Joshua		
2021	Slapface	Lucas		
2021	Boys	Chris	Short film	
2025	Lifeline	Jeff Thomas		

=== Television ===
Year	Title	Role	Notes	Ref(s)
2012	Weeds	Kyle	Episode: "Allosaurus Crush Castle"	
2012	How I Met Your Mother	6 Year Old Marvin	Episode: "Who Wants to Be a Godparent"	
2013	Dads	Alden	Episode: "Pilot"	
2013	Raising Hope	Nerdy Kid	Episode: "Extreme Howdy's Makeover"	
2014–2017	Girl Meets World	Auggie Matthews	Main character	
2014	See Dad Run	Adam	Episode: "See Dad Roast the Toast"	
2014	Suburgatory	Older Kid	Episode: "Blame It on the Rainstick"	
2014	Bones	Scotty	Episode: "The Money Maker on the Merry-Go-Round"	
2016	The Odd Couple	Simon	Episode: "I Kid, You Not"	
2016	Teachers	Kyle	Episode: "Thirty-One and Done"	
2017-2021	Mickey and the Roadster Racers	Puck McSnorter	Voice role; recurring character	
2021	The Conners	Mark's classmate	Episode: "Jeopardé, Sobrieté and Infidelité"	
2023	9-1-1	Bowen Lark	Episode: "Performance Anxiety"	

=== Music video ===
Year	Title	Artist	Notes
2016	"Idaho"	Bryan Lanning	Credited as Lead Boy

== Awards and nominations ==
Year	Award	Category	Nominated work	Result	Ref(s)
2015	Young Artist Awards	Outstanding Young Ensemble in a TV Series	Girl Meets World	Nominated	
2021	The Reaper Awards	Best Actor in Feature Film	Slapface	Won	
