= Scrambled (film) =

2023 film by Leah McKendrick

- Theatrical release poster
- Directed by: Leah McKendrick
- Written by: Leah McKendrick
- Produced by: Gillian Bohrer; Jonathan Levine; Brett Haley; Amanda Mortimer
- Starring: Leah McKendrick; Ego Nwodim; Andrew Santino; Adam Rodriguez; Laura Cerón; Clancy Brown
- Cinematography: Julia Swain
- Edited by: Sandra Torres Granovsky
- Music by: Brittany Allen
- Production company: Megamix
- Distributed by: Lionsgate; Roadside Attractions
- Release dates: March 11, 2023 (SXSW); February 2, 2024 (United States)
- Running time: 100 minutes
- Country: United States
- Language: English
- Budget: $1 million
- Box office: $422,555

Scrambled is a 2023 comedy drama film written, directed by, and starring Leah McKendrick in her directorial debut. It also stars Ego Nwodim, Andrew Santino, Adam Rodriguez, Laura Cerón and Clancy Brown. The film had a world premiere at South by Southwest on March 11, 2023, and was released in theaters on February 2, 2024.

== Plot ==
Nellie Robinson is a single 34-year-old woman who attends friends' weddings and baby showers nearly every weekend. At a wedding, Nellie runs into her friend Monroe who confides in Nellie about her struggles with conceiving at 40. Nellie sees her gynecologist and learns she has diminished ovarian reserve. Though unsure if she wants to be a mother, Nellie decides to freeze her eggs as an option, a procedure that will cost $14,000. After various unsuccessful attempts to raise the money, her brother Jesse reluctantly loans it to her.

As Nellie prepares for the procedure with a regimen of daily injections, she meets with several of her ex-boyfriends to see if any are suitable to rekindle a relationship with, but they only reaffirm her decisions to end the relationships. At an engagement party for a friend, she learns that her ex-boyfriend Shawn, whom she still harbors feelings for, is expecting a child with his new girlfriend. At night, Nellie peers through their window and watches them together. After being caught, she tearfully congratulates them as she runs away.

Nellie's egg retrieval procedure is successful, and her friends and family throw her a party resembling a baby shower. She writes a heartfelt letter to her frozen eggs, thanking them for giving her more time to decide if she wants to be a mother.

== Cast ==
- Leah McKendrick as Nellie
- Ego Nwodim as Sheila, Nellie's Friend
- Andrew Santino as Jesse, Nellie's Brother
- Clancy Brown as Richard, Nellie's Father
- Laura Cerón as Sonja, Nellie's Mother
- June Diane Raphael as Monroe
- Yvonne Strahovski as Sarah
- Feodor Chin as A Doctor
- Adam Rodriguez as Sterling "Peter Pan"
- Harry Shum Jr. as Shawn "The One... That Got Away"
- Camille Mana as Jen
- Max Adler as Ron
- Mimi Kennedy as Zandra
- Henry Zebrowski as Conor
- Amy Lindsay as Mary-Anne

== Production ==
Scrambled is based on Leah McKendrick's own experience with egg-retrieval in 2021. She wrote, directed (in her directorial debut) and starred in the film. The film was produced by Megamix's Gillian Bohrer and Jonathan Levine, along with Brett Haley and Amanda Mortimer. It was executive produced by Mariah Owen, Matthew Helderman, Luke Taylor and Grady Craig from BondIt Media Capital, who provided financing.

Principal photography concluded in September 2022. Cinematographer Julie Swain shot on a Arri Alexa using the OpenGate 4.5k format and the film was edited in Adobe Premiere Pro by Sandra Torres Granovsky.

== Release ==
In September 2022, Lionsgate Films acquired the worldwide distribution rights for Scrambled. It had a world premiere at 2023 South by Southwest Film & TV Festival (SXSW) on March 11, 2023, where Lionsgate held sales for other markets. The film was released in theaters by Lionsgate and Roadside Attractions on February 2, 2024.

== Reception ==
On the review aggregator website Rotten Tomatoes, 94% of 53 critics' reviews are positive, with an average rating of 7.2/10. The website's consensus reads: "An impressive showcase for writer-director-star Leah McKendrick, Scrambled takes a humorous yet heartfelt approach to emotionally charged subject matter." Metacritic, which uses a weighted average, assigned the film a score of 70 out of 100, based on 6 critics, indicating "generally favorable" reviews.

Samantha Bergeson writing for IndieWire gave the film a B+, saying: "At times, Scrambled feels like a TV show, which isn't a bad thing at all. In fact, it's a compliment: the film has quick quips, good timing, and tight pacing mostly found in [sic] nowadays in episodic structures". Nick Allen from RogerEbert.com wrote that even though he thought that some parts of the script was "too forced with its emotions" and its humor "can be too broad", he concluded that Scrambled "proves to overall be a charismatic directorial debut from a promising writer/director/star". He ended his review with, "But Scrambled never loses sight of its sincerity, and McKendrick uses this space to lovingly illuminate, if not destigmatize a fertility option not given nearly as much visibility as other choices. She does so with a wealth of life wisdom and big laughs in the process".

Jessica Kiang of Variety wrote, "Scrambled is a lot of fun when it's not trying to also deliver uplift, but it ultimately proves that white, middle-class American women in their 30s can defeat any obstacle that stands between them and the unfettered life they want, except screenwriting convention".
