= Leah McKendrick =

American actress, writer, & director (born 1986/87)

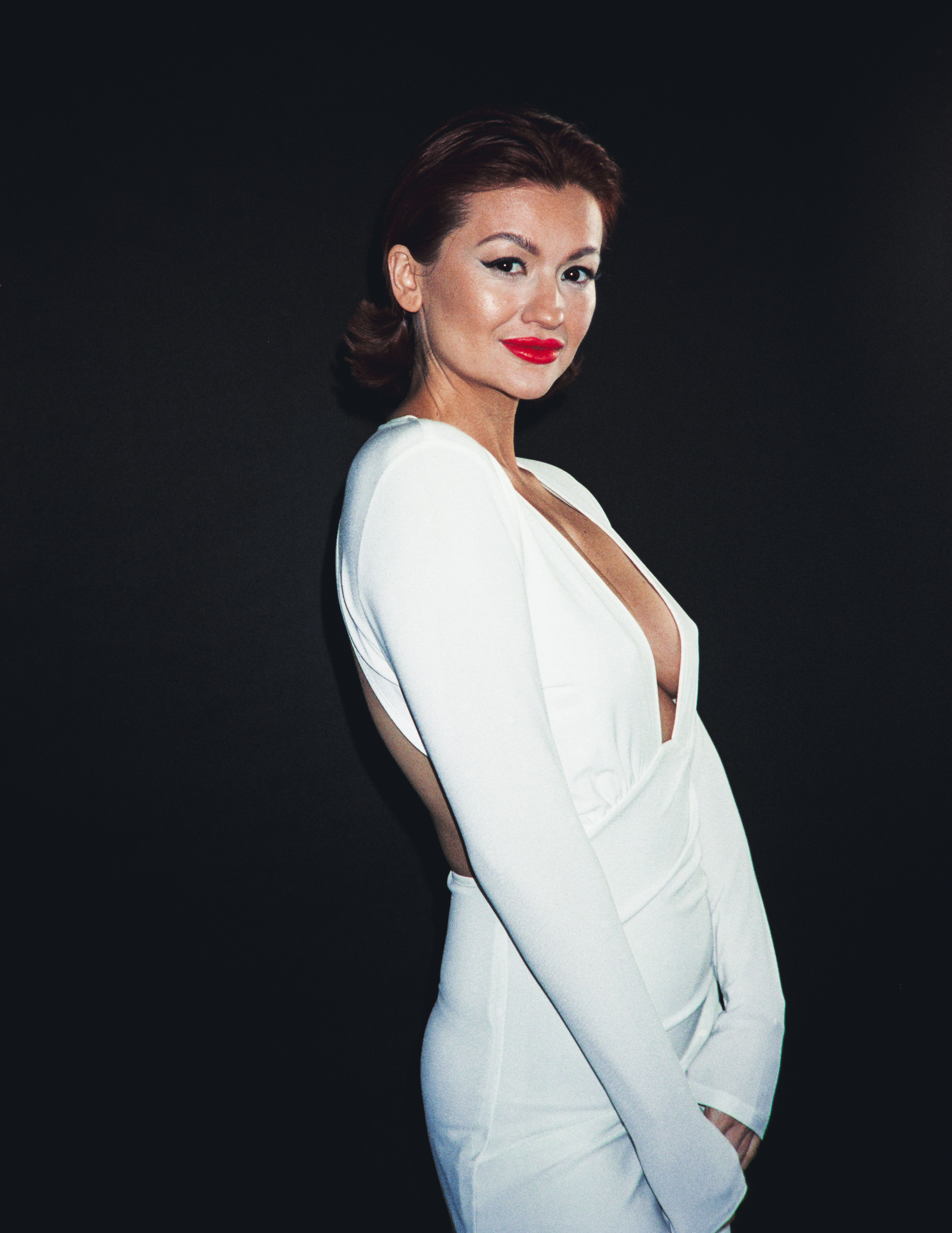
- Born: 1986 or 1987 (age 39–40); San Francisco, California, U.S.
- Education: Chapman University
- Occupations: Film director, screenwriter, actress
- Years active: 2013–present

Leah McKendrick is an American film director, screenwriter, and actress. She is the writer-director of Scrambled (2023) and Voicemails for Isabelle (2026).

== Early life ==
McKendrick was born and raised in San Francisco, California. She grew up in the Richmond District and graduated from Sacred Heart Cathedral Preparatory.

While studying at Chapman University she wrote, produced, directed, and acted in a number of short films and stage plays and graduated in 2008 with a BFA in theatre performance.

== Career ==
In 2014, McKendrick wrote, produced and starred in the pop musical web series Destroy the Alpha Gammas. The series was critically acclaimed, and she was made a Webby Award honoree and received a Streamy Award nomination.

In 2017, McKendrick made her feature film debut as a writer, producer, and actress with M.F.A. at its world premiere at the South by Southwest (SXSW). She began writing the film in 2014.

In 2019, she was hired to write Paramount’s Grease prequel, Summer Lovin', which was later cancelled. In 2020, she wrote, directed and starred in the short film Pamela & Ivy, a feminist origin story for the supervillain Poison Ivy. The film premiered on Collider. The film was a Webby Award honoree for best writing.

In 2022, McKendrick wrote, directed and starred in the feature film Scrambled, about a broke, single 34-year-old woman that decides to freeze her eggs following a breakup. The film was based on her own experience with egg-retrieval in 2021. The film premiered at South by Southwest in March 2023 and was released theatrically by Lionsgate in 2024.

She was named one of IndieWire's "28 Rising Female Filmmakers to Watch" in 2023.

In February 2023, it was announced that McKendrick was writing a legacy sequel to the 1997 slasher I Know What You Did Last Summer for Sony Pictures. McKendrick received story credits for her initial script for the 2025 film.

=== Upcoming projects ===
In April 2024, McKendrick was writing a holiday-comedy film, Mrs. Claus, for Netflix; the film has Jennifer Garner attached to star, and will be produced by Reese Witherspoon and Lauren Neustadter for Hello Sunshine.

In August 2024, McKendrick was attached to write and direct an untitled monster project for Atomic Monster and Universal Pictures, with James Wan and Michael Clear attached to produce.

In June 2026, McKendrick was announced to write and direct Shania, a biopic about Shania Twain for Sony Pictures.

== Select filmography ==
Year	Film	Director	Writer	Producer
2017	M.F.A.	No	Yes	Yes
2023	Scrambled	Yes	Yes	No
2025	I Know What You Did Last Summer	No	Story	No
2026	Voicemails for Isabelle	Yes	Yes	No

=== Actress ===
Year	Title	Role	Notes
2016	Misconduct	Amy	
2016	Bad Moms	Sharon	
2017	M.F.A.	Skye	
2019	The Turkey Bowl	Brandy Best	
2020	A Nice Girl Like You	Honey Parker	
2023	Scrambled	Nellie Robinson	
2025	I Know What You Did Last Summer	Newscaster	
2026	Voicemails for Isabelle	Breeda	
