= Love Is All You Need? (2016 film) =

- Official poster
- Directed by: K. Rocco Shields
- Screenplay by: David Tillman; K. Rocco Shields
- Story by: K. Rocco Shields
- Based on: Idea by Brian Whitaker; Concept by K. Rocco Shields
- Produced by: Michael J. Zampino
- Starring: Briana Evigan; Tyler Blackburn; Emily Osment; Ana Ortiz; Jenica Bergere; Katherine LaNasa; Leonard Roberts; Paul Ben-Victor; Elisabeth Röhm; Jeremy Sisto
- Cinematography: Sandra Valde-Hansen
- Edited by: Peggy Eghbalian
- Music by: Bryan Mantia; Melissa Reese
- Production company: Genius Produced
- Release dates: March 5, 2016 (Cinequest Film Festival); October 8, 2016 (United States)
- Running time: 123 minutes
- Country: United States
- Language: English
- Budget: $3.59 million

Love Is All You Need? is a 2016 American drama film directed by K. Rocco Shields, who adapted the film from a screenplay she co-wrote with David Tillman. It stars Briana Evigan, Tyler Blackburn, Emily Osment, Ana Ortiz, Jenica Bergere, Katherine LaNasa, Leonard Roberts, Paul Ben-Victor, Elisabeth Röhm, and Jeremy Sisto. On January 27, 2016, the first trailer for the movie was released. Lexi DiBenedetto, star of the 2011 short the film is based on, reprises her role of Ashley. The film was released on iTunes on November 24, 2016.

== Plot ==
In a world where homosexuality is the norm and heterosexuality is shunned, Jude Klein is the star quarterback of Western Indiana University, a religious college in a conservative town. Her girlfriend, popular sorority girl Kelly, is running for homecoming queen. Both attend a local church run by heterophobic reverend Rachel Duncan.

At a frat party, Jude meets sports journalism major Ryan Morris, who is writing a story on her for the school magazine. They begin meeting regularly at a broken-down merry-go-round near campus. One night, after he surprises her by fixing the merry-go-round, they kiss. Jude confides in Susan Miller, the head of the newly formed Heterosexual Alliance Club, who encourages her to come out to her friends and family. Jude plans to conceal her heterosexuality to not jeopardize her football career, but she and Ryan eventually confess their mutual love and have sex. Kelly, who secretly followed Jude, sees them and vengefully films their encounter.

Jude breaks up with Kelly, while Ryan is ejected from his fraternity for refusing to play "seven minutes in heaven" with another guy. Jude later discovers that Kelly has posted photos of her and Ryan kissing across the dorm hall. Jude leaves a voicemail for Ryan, warning him to get somewhere safe. That night, she prays to God for a sign that her love for Ryan is not wrong, before finding a bible verse that eases her worries. The news of her outing reaches Rachel.

Jude faces coldness from her teammates and hostility from the crowd at the homecoming game while Ryan cheers her on from afar. During the last play, the other team attacks Jude, gravely injuring her. While attempting to help her, Ryan is cornered by his former fraternity, whom Rachel has advised to "snuff out sin wherever they see it." They take him to the merry-go-round and severely beat him. Jude awakens in the hospital with Susan at her side.

Young Emily Curtis accompanies one of her mothers, Karen, to greet Susan, who has just moved in next door to them. They learn that Susan is married to a man. As they leave, Karen explains to Emily that her other mother, Vicki, would not want their family associating with heterosexuals.

Emily is removed from her junior high's football team and is comforted by classmate Ian Santilli. They befriend each other despite harassment from Ian's older sister, Paula. They both plan to audition for the titular roles in the school play, a heterosexual version of Shakespeare's Romeo and Julio, which drama teacher Dave Thompson has rewritten in hopes of promoting tolerance.

Thompson is fired after the school receives multiple complaints about the play. Ian ceases contact with Emily after realizing she is heterosexual, not wanting anyone to think he is "like her." Emily is assaulted by Paula and her friends, who write "HETERO" on her forehead. At home, Karen attempts to comfort her, but Vicki orders her to go upstairs and clean herself up. Emily overhears her mothers arguing, and Vicki claiming that Emily is at risk of becoming "another Ryan Morris." Emily researches the name, finds a video of his assault, and learns that he is currently comatose. She locks herself in her bathroom and attempts suicide by slitting her wrists. Karen and Vicki break the door down just as Emily falls unconscious from blood loss.

Ryan later succumbs to his injuries. Jude speaks at his funeral service, thanking God for giving her Ryan and quoting Romeo and Julio. After the service, Jude speaks to Emily, who survived her suicide attempt. The two agree that heterosexual love is no different from homosexual love. The Santillis converse with the Millers, seemingly beginning to accept them.

Jude visits the prison where Rachel is now incarcerated for inciting the hate crime that led to Ryan's death. Jude reads Rachel the bible verse she found - 1 Peter 4:8: Above all, love each other deeply, because love covers over a multitude of sins. Jude sits on the merry-go-round, repeatedly listening to a voicemail Ryan left her during the homecoming game, in which he promises her he is safe, loves her, and will see her soon.

== Cast ==
- Briana Evigan as Jude Klein
- Tyler Blackburn as Ryan Morris
- Emily Osment as Kelly Williams
- Elisabeth Röhm as Reverend Rachel
- Jeremy Sisto as Mr. Thompson
- Ana Ortiz as Susan Miller
- Kyla Kenedy as Emily Curtis
- Blake Cooper Griffin as Bill Bradley
- Katherine LaNasa as Vicki Curtis
- Jenica Bergere as Karen Curtis
- Paul Ben-Victor as Principal Birdsell
- Leonard Roberts as Coach Thompson
- Jacob Rodier as Ian Santilli
- Ava Allan as Paula Santilli
- Robert Gant as Pete Santilli
- Shawn Parsons as Allen Santilli
- Leisha Hailey as Coach Jenkins
- Lexi DiBenedetto as Ashley Curtis
- Tim Chiou as Brad Henderson
- Mike C. Manning as Benson

== Production ==
On October 15, 2014, it was reported that Emily Osment, Briana Evigan and Kyla Kenedy would be featured in the film. On October 21, 2014, Jeremy Sisto, Ana Ortiz, Katherine La Nasa, Jenica Bergere and Leonard Roberts joined the film's main cast. On October 28, 2014, Tyler Blackburn joined the film.

The film was shot in Los Angeles in early October 2014.
