= Mike Manning (actor) =

American actor

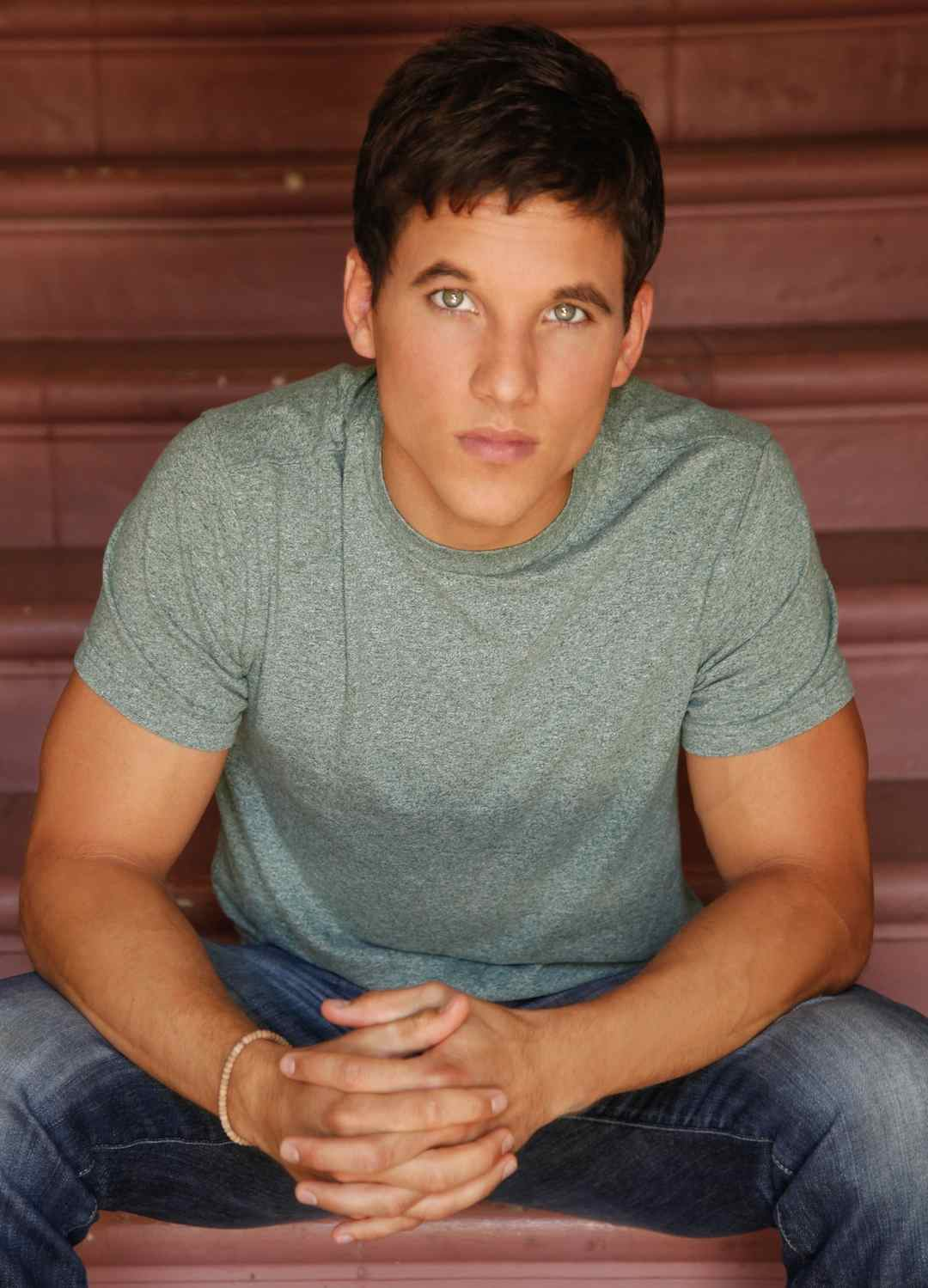
- Manning in 2013
- Born: Michael Christopher Manning; April 12, 1987 (age 39)
- Other name: Mike C. Manning
- Occupations: Actor; producer; writer; television personality
- Years active: 2009–present
- Spouse: Nicholas Tocco (m. 2017)
- Modeling information
- Height: 5 ft 10 in (1.78 m)
- Website: www.mikemanning.info

Michael Christopher Manning (born April 12, 1987) is an American actor, producer, former reality television personality, and activist. Manning gained fame as a cast member on the MTV series The Real World: D.C. in 2009. Before subsequently embarking on an acting career, he appeared in a number of films and television programs, such as the 2014 Disney Channel original movie Cloud 9, in which he played Nick Swift, Hawaii Five-0, Love Is All You Need? (2016), Teen Wolf, The Call, Son of the South and Days of Our Lives.

As a producer, his work includes the documentary Kidnapped for Christ, and The Bay, which won the 2020 Daytime Emmy Award for Outstanding Digital Daytime Drama Series. He won the 2021 Daytime Emmy Award Outstanding Performance By a Supporting Actor in a Daytime Fiction Program and nominated for a 2024 Daytime Emmy Award for Outstanding Supporting Actor in a Drama Series for his performance as Caleb McKinnon. He is nominated for a 2026 Daytime Emmy Award for Outstanding Supporting Actor in a Drama Series for his performance as Bradley "Smitty" Smith on Beyond the Gates.

== Early life ==
Mike Manning is from Thornton, Colorado. His parents are Michael Sr. and Susan Manning. The oldest of three children, he has a younger brother named Jonathan and a younger sister named Alyssa. He grew up in Colorado and Florida.

Manning was involved with children's theater. He started acting in high school in productions of And They Dance Real Slow in Jackson and Oliver!, based on the classic Charles Dickens story. He was described in his MTV biography as "the typical jock...a star athlete, prom king, popular with all the girls...an all around golden child from a Christian family."

== Acting career ==
As an actor, Manning is best known for his role in the Disney Channel original movie Cloud 9, centered around competitive snowboarding, with a premiere date of January 17, 2014. Manning played Nick Swift in the movie, and was trained by ex-members of the US Olympic Snowboarding Team for the role.

Manning appeared in eCupid, which premiered at the Honolulu Rainbow Film Festival. In June 2012 Manning appeared in the Hallmark Channel comedy film Operation Cupcake.

Manning appeared in "Kapu", the January 14, 2013, episode of the CBS TV series Hawaii Five-0, in which he played a young college student. He appeared in the short horror film Campsite Killer. Manning appeared in "Party Crasher", November 5, 2012, episode of Disney XD's Crash & Bernstein, playing the Australian boyfriend of the lead female Amanda. Manning performed opposite Rae Dawn Chong in Lisa Phillips Visca's play CLIMAX, premiering at the Santa Monica Playhouse in Santa Monica, California.

Manning later appeared in the final season of the MTV show Teen Wolf. He appeared in the fifth and sixth seasons of the Amazon Prime drama series The Bay (which he also produced), and would later appear in the first season of the spin-off series yA, which featured the same characters. The Bay was nominated for seven 2020 Daytime Emmy Awards, including "Outstanding Writing Team for a Digital Drama Series," and "Outstanding Directing Team for a Digital Drama Series," and won for "Outstanding Digital Daytime Drama Series." That same year, it was announced Manning had joined the cast of NBC's Days of Our Lives as Charlie Dale.

In August 2019, Deadline Hollywood reported that Manning would produce and appear in Slapface, a feature-length adaptation of Jeremiah Kipp's 2017 short horror film of the same name, in which he would play Tom, the older brother of the main protagonist, Lucas, played by August Maturo. The film premiered at the Cinequest Film Festival on March 20, 2021.

In May 2021, Manning was cast as Shane Collins in the indie sports drama The Way Out, which is written and directed by Barry Jay, and scheduled for a 2022 release. On January 25, 2022, it was announced that Manning joined the cast of the final season of NBC's This Is Us, in the recurring role as the actor who takes over for Kevin Pearson (Justin Hartley) on The Manny. On February 11, 2022, Manning joined the cast of the action-horror film The Bell Keeper, which is directed by Colton Tran.

In October 2024, it was announced Manning had been cast as Bradley "Smitty" Smith on the CBS soap opera Beyond the Gates. The serial premiered in February 2025. He will appear as JJ Roman in the audio drama Montecito, beginning April 22, 2025.

=== The Real World: DC ===
Manning's TV career started in 2009 at age 22 on The Real World: DC, the twenty-third season of MTV's reality television series The Real World, for which Manning auditioned on a random lark with a friend. Having had recently come out as bisexual, the revelation caused conflict with some of his loved ones. In his pre-show interviews, Manning described himself as a "pile of contradictions," and indicated that his time in D.C. would be a turning point for him and the question of whether his family would accept his sexuality. Manning explained in the season premiere that he attended church every Sunday, through which he hoped to bond with his castmate and fellow churchgoer, Ashley Lindley. His storyline also depicted his social life, in particular his newfound freedom to date, and his concerns regarding family and religion.

Manning joined the cast with the intention of working as an environmentalist, but unexpectedly became an activist for LGBT rights as well, working for the Human Rights Campaign and the Energy Action Coalition. During the course of his work for the latter, Manning met with Congressman Jared Polis of Colorado and Congressman James P. Moran of Virginia, and attended the October 10, 2009, HRC dinner at which President Barack Obama spoke.

During The Real World: Washington D.C. Reunion, which premiered on March 31, 2010, following the season finale, Manning indicated he was attending Bible study, and had recently acquired a job as a host on a TV show. Since the show, Mike has stated that being on The Real World: DC helped him to realize the power of television to help influence public opinion and create social change, and was ultimately a large part in his decision to help found the production company Chhibber Mann Productions.

== Producing career ==
In 2014, Manning co-founded the production company Chhibber Mann Productions with actor/producer Vinny Chhibber. The production company was involved with producing the film Folk Hero & Funny Guy, which was directed by Jeff Grace. The film stars actors Wyatt Russell, Alex Karpovsky and Melanie Lynskey, and centers around a story about two best friends, one being a struggling comedian and the other being a successful singer-songwriter. The Chhibber Mann Production company website says that its mission is to create content "to connect audiences with entertainment that matters," projects with an aspect of positive social change.

Manning is an Executive Producer on the documentary film Kidnapped for Christ along with 'N Sync alum Lance Bass. The film sheds light on controversial behavior modification methods used on children, sent there by their parents, at an Evangelical Christian reform school "Escuela Caribe" located in the Dominican Republic. Kidnapped for Christ premiered at the Slamdance Film Festival in Park City, UT at the end of January 2014. Tom DeSanto, executive producer of the X-Men and Transformers films is also involved with the project. The film was sold to Showtime and released on television July 10, 2014. Promotional materials for the film, including the website, contain a push for the passage of the U.S. Stop Child Abuse in Residential Programs for Teens Act of 2013. The bill would take steps to regulate against neglect and abuse in residential programs like Escuela Caribe. Manning only became involved with the film because of his friendship with the main protagonist, and he is now working to produce another documentary with Kidnapped for Christ director Kate Logan entitled "An Act of Love," the story of Reverend Frank Schaefer being defrocked by the United Methodist Church. Pauley Perrette, best known for her role as "Abby Sciuto" on the CBS show NCIS, is also an executive producer on the film. An Act of Love had its World Premiere at the Mill Valley Film Festival on October 9, 2015, and won the Audience Favorite, Silver Award in the 2015 Valley of the Docs category.

Manning is a producer on the feature-length documentary film Lost in America, a film that follows director Rotimi Rainwater, a former homeless youth, around the United States to examine the issues surrounding youth homelessness. The film is executive produced by actress Rosario Dawson and singer Jewel, and features actors Halle Berry, Tiffany Haddish, and singer Jon Bon Jovi. The film was produced in association with Manning's company Chhibber Mann Productions.

== Awards ==
On June 11, 2010, Manning was awarded the 2011 Courage Award by the Los Angeles–based organization LifeWorks, for his dedication to the youth development and mentoring program. He was also awarded Weekender magazine's Rebel with a Cause Award. He is also the official youth ambassador for the anti-bullying organization Boo2Bullying.

In July 2018, Manning won a Diamond Award for Best Actor at the LA Shorts Awards for the film Words Left Unsaid.

In June 2020, Manning and the producing team of The Bay won the Daytime Emmy Award for Outstanding Digital Daytime Drama Series at the 47th Daytime Emmy Awards. On July 18, 2021, Manning won Daytime Emmy Award for Outstanding Performance By a Supporting Actor in a Daytime Fiction Program, as Caleb McKinnon at the 48th Daytime Emmy Awards.

== Personal life ==
As of 2011, Manning lives in Los Angeles. He enjoys outdoor activities including skiing, wakeboarding, and surfing.

Manning is bisexual. In a 2022 interview, he revealed that he married his husband, Nicholas Tocco in October 2017.

== Filmography ==
=== Television ===
Year	Title	Role	Notes
2025–present	Beyond the Gates	Bradley "Smitty" Smith	Soap opera; series regular
2022	This Is Us	The Manny	Season 6 recurring
2020–2022	Days of Our Lives	Charlie Dale	Soap opera; recurring role
2020	The Haves and the Have Nots	Officer Morris	3 episodes
2020	yA	Caleb McKinnon	8 episodes
2019–present	The Bay	Caleb McKinnon	Soap opera webseries / Season 5 and 6 recurring; also producer
2019	Six Degrees of Separation	Ronald Fein	Mini-series
2018	Tommy in La La Land	Himself	3 episodes
2017	Teen Wolf	Deputy Farrell	2 episodes
2016	Major Crimes	Glen Cole	1 episode
2014–2016	Youthful Daze	Colin Morris	42 episodes; also executive producer
2013	Hawaii Five-0	Jonah Adkins	1 episode
2012	Crash & Bernstein	Trey	1 episode
2012	The Passion Project	Himself	1 episode; also producer
2009–2010	The Real World: D.C.	Himself	Reality show / 16 episodes

=== Film ===
Year	Title	Role	Notes
2026	The Wolf and the Lamb	Silas	
2023	The Engagement Dress	Preston	
2023	The Nana Project	Todd Stevens	
2023	The Bell Keeper	Matthew	
2023	The Dirty South	Eric	
2023	Scrambled	Michael	
2022	Babylon	New York Fan	
2022	The Way Out	Shane Collins	
2021	Slapface	Tom	Also producer
2020	The Call	Zack	
2020	Son of the South	Townsend Ellis	Also executive producer
2019	Killer Date	Rory	Also producer
2019	Intuitions	Mark	Alternative title Prescience
2018	Jinn	Kevin	Also executive producer
2018	Lost in America	Self	Documentary; Also producer
2018	Dirt Merchants: Rebelistic	Spencer Corales	
2018	God's Not Dead: A Light in Darkness	Adam	
2018	Ice: The Movie	Jake Alden	
2018	Delirium	Chase	
2017	M.F.A.	Jeremiah	Also producer
2017	Limelight	Trent	
2016	Love Is All You Need?	Benson	
2016	Folk Hero & Funny Guy	Cardie	Also executive producer
2015	WWJD What Would Jesus Do? The Journey Continues	Nick	
2015	Showpony	Ben	Short film
2014	Case #13	Chase	
2014	Jen Foster: She	Best Man	Short film
2014	Cloud 9	Nick Swift	TV movie
2013	Black Hearts	Greg	
2013	Bike Cops Van Nuys	Ari	TV movie
2013	Channing	Nina's Boyfriend	TV movie
2013	Violence of the Mind	Brock	
2012	Campsite Killer	Chad	Short film
2012	I Do	Craig	
2012	Operation Cupcake	Ray MacEwan	TV movie
2011	Never Forget	Brendan	Short film
2011	Gingerdead Man 3: Saturday Night Cleaver	Adonis / Bugsby	
2011	eCupid	Myles	
2011	The Brothers Sinclair	Jeffrey Sinclair	
2011	Velcro Love Triangle	John	Short film

== Awards and nominations ==
Year	Ceremony	Category	Nominated work	Result	Ref.
2021	Daytime Creative Arts Emmys	Outstanding Performance by a Supporting Actor in a Daytime Fiction Program	The Bay	Won	
2022	Indie Series Awards	Best Supporting Actor – Drama	The Bay	Nominated	
2024	Daytime Emmy Awards	Outstanding Supporting Actor in a Drama Series	The Bay	Nominated	
2026	Daytime Emmy Awards	Outstanding Supporting Actor in a Drama Series	Beyond the Gates	Nominated	
