= 2023 F.League Ocean Cup =

Tournament details
- Country: Japan
- Dates: 15–21 May 2023
- Teams: 25

Final positions
- Champions: Nagoya Oceans (10th title)
- Runners-up: Bardral Urayasu

Tournament statistics
- Matches played: 25
- Goals scored: 140 (5.6 per match)
- Top goal scorer(s): Andresito, 6 goals
- All statistics correct as of 21 May 2023.

The 2023 F.League Ocean Cup (Fリーグ オーシャンカップ) will be the 13th edition of the F.League league cup tournament. It will be entirely played on a knockout stage format.

== Calendar ==
Round	Date	Matches	Clubs	New entries this round
First round	15–16 May 2023	22	22 → 12	18 F.League clubs; 4 Special teams/Wildcards
Second round	17 May 2023	6	12 → 6	1: Bardral Urayasu
Quarter-finals	18 May 2023	4	8 → 4	2: Nagoya Oceans and Tachikawa Athletic
Semi-finals	20 May 2023	2	4 → 2	
Final	21 May 2023	1	2 → 1	

== Venues ==
The venues and their locations are as follows:

Name	Located on
Ésforta Arena Hachiōji	Hachioji, Tokyo
Adastria Mito Arena	Mito, Ibaraki

== Participating clubs ==
F.League 1	F.League 2	Others
Espolada Hokkaido; Bardral Urayasu; Fugador Sumida; Shinagawa City; Tachikawa Athletic; Pescadola Machida; YSCC Yokohama; Shonan Bellmare; Nagoya Oceans; Shriker Osaka; Bork Bullet Kitakyushu; Vasagey Oita	Voscuore Sendai; Malva Mito; Ligarevia Katsushika; Vincedor Hakusan; Boaluz Nagano; Agleymina Hamamatsu; Hiroshima F.Do; Miracle Smile Niihama; Porseid Hamada	Japan Under-19; O-PA (Note: 23th All-Japan Futsal Regional Champions League winners); Ritsumeikan University All.1 (Note: 2022-23 Luxperior Cup / Regional University Futsal Champions League winners); Zott Waseda (Note: 12th All-Japan Futsal Facility Federation Championship winners)

== Schedule ==
=== First round ===
15 May 2023 Match 1	Zott Waseda	2–3	Shinagawa City	Tokyo
16:00	Takase 7'; Nakai 21'	Report	Sakai 9'; Niwa 14'; Araki 16'	Stadium: Ésforta Arena Hachiōji; Attendance: 326; Referee: Katsuharu Kawamura

15 May 2023 Match 2	Ligarevia Katsushika	1–3	Espolada Hokkaido	Tokyo
18:30	Sasaki 21'	Report	Yamamoto 6'; Own goal 22' (o.g.); Suzuki 32'	Stadium: Ésforta Arena Hachiōji; Attendance: 266; Referee: Seiya Yamasaki

15 May 2023 Match 3	Agleymina Hamamatsu	3–5	Shonan Bellmare	Tokyo
18:30	Yamagiri 5', 12' (pen.); Ishikawa 38'	Report	Hagiwara 12'; Own goal 22' (o.g.); Ushisako 32'; Tsuda 35'; Horiuchi 39'	Stadium: Ésforta Arena Hachiōji; Attendance: 284; Referee: Hiroyuki Kobayashi

16 May 2023 Match 4	Porseid Hamada	2–2 (2–4 p)	Vasagey Oita	Tokyo
10:30	Ishii 8', 38'	Report	Hashimoto 22'; Miyashita 36'	Stadium: Ésforta Arena Hachiōji; Attendance: 132; Referee: Katsuharu Kawamura

16 May 2023 Match 5	Miracle Smile Niihama	3–9	Shriker Osaka	Tokyo
10:30	Tatara 6'; Shibahara 10'; Kondo 37'	Report	Nomura 1', 22'; Shimizu 2'; Nakamatsu 12', 12'; Nakai 14'; Iguchi 17'; Isomura 25'; Kato 39'	Stadium: Ésforta Arena Hachiōji; Attendance: 72; Referee: Yuji Kurihara

16 May 2023 Match 6	Japan U-19	0–2	YSCC Yokohama	Tokyo
13:00		Report	Tsutsumi 13', 33'	Stadium: Ésforta Arena Hachiōji; Attendance: 302; Referee: Akane Yagi

16 May 2023 Match 7	Ritsumeikan University All.1	6–7	Malva Mito	Tokyo
13:00	Minao 6', 15'; Yamaoka 30'; Yasuda 31', 33', 34'	Report	Yaramaki 15'; Yamamoto 16', 17'; Kikuchi 17'; Sanada 27', 39'; Honda 37'	Stadium: Ésforta Arena Hachiōji; Attendance: 109; Referee: Tsubasa Oya

16 May 2023 Match 8	Hiroshima F.Do	2–6	Fugador Sumida	Tokyo
15:30	Wada 20'; Uchida 29'	Report	Sunahara 8', 24'; Nakada 18'; Kurimoto 33', 36'; Hatakeyama 39'	Stadium: Ésforta Arena Hachiōji; Attendance: 158; Referee: Hiroyasu Nishikawa

16 May 2023 Match 9	Voscuore Sendai	1–1 (3–2 p)	Bork Bullet Kitakyushu	Tokyo
15:30	Hashimoto 12'	Report	Urakami 39'	Stadium: Ésforta Arena Hachiōji; Attendance: 113; Referee: Hiroyuki Kobayashi

16 May 2023 Match 10	O-PA	2–4	Pescadola Machida	Tokyo
18:00	Okuhashi 5'; Kuroya 32'	Report	Endo 6'; Hinenoya 26'; Nakamura 27'; Yamanaka 40'	Stadium: Ésforta Arena Hachiōji; Attendance: 256; Referee: Satoru Mukoyama

16 May 2023 Match 11	Vincedor Hakusan	0–0 (5–6 p)	Boaluz Nagano	Tokyo
18:00		Report		Stadium: Ésforta Arena Hachiōji; Attendance: 126; Referee: Kohei Tsunekuni

=== Second round ===
17 May 2023 Match 12	Shinagawa City	0–2	Espolada Hokkaido	Tokyo
10:30		Report	Obara 25'; Murota 40'	Stadium: Ésforta Arena Hachiōji; Attendance: 114; Referee: Hiroyasu Nishikawa

17 May 2023 Match 13	Shonan Bellmare	5–0	Vasagey Oita	Tokyo
10:30	Tsuruya 2'; Hagiwara 11'; Uchimura 14'; Honda 29'; Hayashida 35'	Report		Stadium: Ésforta Arena Hachiōji; Attendance: 117; Referee: Kohei Tsunekuni

17 May 2023 Match 14	Shriker Osaka	1–1 (4–2 p)	YSCC Yokohama	Tokyo
13:00	Nakamatsu 1'	Report	Yasui 36'	Stadium: Ésforta Arena Hachiōji; Attendance: 124; Referee: Takashi Yokoyama

17 May 2023 Match 15	Bardral Urayasu	4–2	Malva Mito	Tokyo
13:00	Nagasaki 8'; Ide 23'; Ito 26'; Oshima 40'	Report	Karashima 1', 13'	Stadium: Ésforta Arena Hachiōji; Attendance: 116; Referee: Mari Yamamoto

17 May 2023 Match 16	Fugador Sumida	3–1	Voscuore Sendai	Tokyo
15:30	Kitamura 17'; Hatakeyama 28'; Nakada 36'	Report	Imai 40'	Stadium: Ésforta Arena Hachiōji; Attendance: 128; Referee: Yukihiro Ikeda

17 May 2023 Match 17	Pescadola Machida	1–2	Boaluz Nagano	Tokyo
15:30	Abe 13'	Report	Mikasa 14', 40'	Stadium: Ésforta Arena Hachiōji; Attendance: 188; Referee: Takashi Nishino

=== Quarter-finals ===
18 May 2023 Match 18	Nagoya Oceans	11–2	Espolada Hokkaido	Tokyo
11:00	Andresito 1', 16'; Darlan 5', 35'; Onitsuka 4'; Yoshikawa 15', 24'; Yagi 20', 37'; Mizutani 20', 39'	Report	Hongo 30'; Mizukami 39'	Stadium: Ésforta Arena Hachiōji; Attendance: 184; Referee: Satoru Mukoyama

18 May 2023 Match 19	Shonan Bellmare	1–1 (3–4 p)	Shriker Osaka	Tokyo
11:00	Ushisako 21'	Report	Kato 29'	Stadium: Ésforta Arena Hachiōji; Attendance: 184; Referee: Makoto Sato

18 May 2023 Match 20	Bardral Urayasu	5–1	Fugador Sumida	Tokyo
13:30	Tanaka 3'; Sora 7'; Shibayama 18'; Nagasaka 22', 36'	Report	Own goal 8' (o.g.)	Stadium: Ésforta Arena Hachiōji; Attendance: 132; Referee: Kiyonari Yamazaki

18 May 2023 Match 21	Boaluz Nagano	0–4	Tachikawa Athletic	Tokyo
13:30		Report	Nakamura 10'; Minamoto 17'; Arai 23'; Uemura 35'	Stadium: Ésforta Arena Hachiōji; Attendance: 213; Referee: Takeshi Fujita

=== Semi-finals ===
20 May 2023 Match 22	Nagoya Oceans	5–2	Shriker Osaka	Mito
11:00	Andresito 17', 26', 34' (pen.); Darlan 23'; Tabuchi 40'	Report	Nakamatsu 24'; Kato 36'	Stadium: Adastria Mito Arena; Attendance: 345; Referee: Yukihiro Ikeda

20 May 2023 Match 23	Bardral Urayasu	5–3	Tachikawa Athletic	Mito
13:30	Nagasaka 3'; Kato 8', 15'; Oshima 10'; Tanaka 37'	Report	Nagumo 11'; Minamoto 23'; Arai 32', 35'	Stadium: Adastria Mito Arena; Attendance: 360; Referee: Kohei Tsunekuni

=== 3rd-place match ===
21 May 2023 Match 24	Shriker Osaka	3–5	Tachikawa Athletic	Mito
11:00	Kato 6'; Tamura 36', 39'	Report	Arai 3'; Yuasa 5'; Sugaya 10', 33'; Nagumo 37'	Stadium: Adastria Mito Arena; Attendance: 415; Referee: Takashi Yokoyama

=== Final ===
21 May 2023 Match 25	Nagoya Oceans	5–1	Bardral Urayasu	Mito
13:30	Ando 18', 38'; Andresito 21'; Shimizu 29'; Kanazawa 33'	Report	Sora 27'	Stadium: Adastria Mito Arena; Attendance: 429; Referee: Hiroyuki Kobayashi

== See also ==
- F.League
