= Mountain Creek State High School =

Coordinates: 26°41′16″S 153°06′14″E

- Sunshine Coast, Queensland; Australia

Information
- Type: Independent public school
- Motto: Quality, Opportunity, Excellence
- Established: 1995
- Principal: Brian Parr
- Grades: 7–12
- Enrolment: Approximately 2,125
- Campus: Mountain Creek, Queensland
- Colour: Navy Fuchsia
- Mascot: Creeker
- Website: mountaincreekshs.eq.edu.au

Mountain Creek State High School (MCSHS) is a co-ed secondary school on Queensland's Sunshine Coast. It is located in the suburb of Mountain Creek, 96 kilometres (60 mi) north of Brisbane.

== Structure ==
The school is organised around five sub-schools that are designed to break down the large size of the school. They are named after local islands:

- Bribie (red) after Bribie Island
- Stradbroke (yellow) after Stradbroke Island
- Fraser (green) after Fraser Island
- Moreton (blue) after Moreton Island
- Mudjimba (purple) after Mudjimba Island, established in 2019

Consequently, each academic cohort of roughly 275 students in the middle school is taught by the same group of about 25 teachers, who are also responsible for pastoral care.

The school community is supported by The Creeker Foundation, the P&C Association, the Local Chaplaincy Committee (with two resident chaplains) and the following groups: Lions Mooloolaba, Life Church Sunshine Coast, Goodlife Community Centre and Redfrogs Australia.

In 2015, the school began educating year 7 students. It has a strict catchment restriction.

== Expertise ==
In 2000, the school won the Education Queensland's Showcase For Excellence Award.

=== International ===
The school is an International Baccalaureate Diploma Programme, supporting a 5% international student population. The school also provides international exposure trips to Asia, Europe and Latin America. It is a long-term member of the Council of International Schools Australia.

== Notable alumni ==
Australian rules football

- Noah Cumberland, former Australian rules footballer for Richmond in the Australian Football League (AFL)
- Ty Gallop, Australian rules footballer for the Brisbane Lions in the Australian Football League (AFL)
- Courtney Murphy, Australian rules footballer for Essendon in the AFL Women's (AFLW)
- Tahlia Randall, Australian rules footballer for North Melbourne in the AFL Women's (AFLW)

Rugby league

- Tyson Andrews, former rugby league player for the Manly Warringah Sea Eagles in the National Rugby League (NRL) and the Indigenous All Stars
- Jai Bowden, rugby league player for the Melbourne Storm in the National Rugby League (NRL)
- Trent Loiero, rugby league player for the Melbourne Storm in the National Rugby League (NRL) and the Queensland Maroons
- Jordan Meads, former rugby league player for the Newcastle Thunder in the British RFL League One and the Greek Titans
- Riley Price, rugby league player for the Penrith Panthers in the National Rugby League (NRL)
- Tyson Smoothy, rugby league player for Wakefield Trinity in the European Super League
- Jack Underhill, rugby league player for the Canterbury-Bankstown Bulldogs in the National Rugby League

Other sports

- Caitlin Bettenay, professional beach volleyballer and former player for the Australia women's national volleyball team
- Korey Boddington, Paralympic track cyclist and gold medalist at the Paris 2024 Games
- Elliott Hagen, former rugby union player for Bay of Plenty in the National Provincial Championship (NPC)
- Jonathan Janssen, basketball player for the Tokyo Hachioji Bee Trains in the Japanese B.League
- Brad Newley, former basketball player for the Townsville Crocodiles, Sydney Kings & Melbourne United in the National Basketball League (NBL) as well as the Australian Boomers. Also played for the Forestville Eagles (CABL), Australian Institute of Sport (SEABL), Houston Rockets (NBA Summer League), Panionios (GBL), Panellinios (GBL), Beşiktaş (TBL), Lietuvos Rytas (LKL), Valencia (Liga ACB/EuroCup), AEK Athens (GBL) and the Frankston Blues (NBL1)
- Bryce Street, cricketer for the Queensland Bulls in the Sheffield Shield and the One-Day Cup
- Courtney Webb, cricketer for South Australia in the Women's National Cricket League (WNCL) and the Melbourne Renegades in the Women's Big Bash League (WBBL). Former Australian rules footballer for the Carlton Football Club in the AFL Women's (AFLW)

== See also ==
- Education in Australia
- List of schools in Queensland
