= Daniel Breen =

Daniel Breen may refer to:

- Dan Breen (1894–1969), Irish politician
- J. Daniel Breen (born 1950), American federal judge
- Danny Breen (politician) (born c. 1962), Canadian politician
- Danny Breen (actor) (1950–2017), American actor, comedian, and television producer
