= Anne Bloom =

American former actress

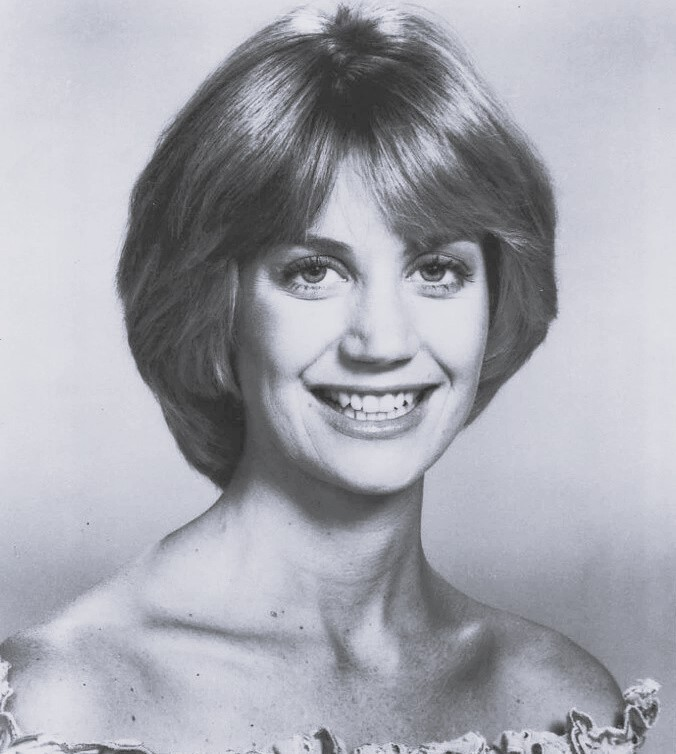
- Bloom in 1978
- Occupations: Actress, voice artist, marriage/family therapist
- Years active: 1974–present

Anne Bloom is an American former film and television actress.

== Biography ==
Bloom's television acting career, which spans three decades, began with an appearance on ABC's medical drama Marcus Welby, M.D. in 1974. She also had a brief film career including the part of Peter Billingsley's mother in 1985's The Dirt Bike Kid, though she is probably best known for her television career, especially for her role as television news correspondent Frosty Kimelman on HBO's Not Necessarily the News. for which she was four times nominated for Cable Ace Award for Best Actress in a Comedy Series. She also appeared as Parker Lewis' mother Judy for the first season of the Fox sitcom Parker Lewis Can't Lose, being replaced in subsequent seasons by Mary Ellen Trainor. She was a regular on The $25,000 Pyramid for five years, a hostess of Totally Hidden Video and one of the first panelists on Relatively Speaking.

Today, Bloom is a licensed marriage and family therapist in Beverly Hills, California.

== Filmography ==
=== Films ===
Year	Film	Role	Director	Notes
1980	Loving Couples	Nurse	Jack Smight	
1985	The Dirt Bike Kid	Janet Simmons	Hoite C. Caston	
1987	Talking Walls		Stephen Verona	
1989	That's Adequate	Maid Marian	Harry Hurwitz	
2009	The History of Coolness: A Look Back at Parker Lewis Can't Lose	Self	Reed Kaplan	Direct-to-video documentary
2011	I Want Justin Bieber for Christmas	Girl's Mother	David Daniel, David Rapka, Victor Vaca	Direct-to-video short film

=== Television ===
Year(s)	Title	Role(s)	Notes
1974	Marcus Welby, M.D.	Susan	S6E13 "The 266 Days"
1975	Cage Without a Key	Joleen	TV movie
1975	Police Story	Monroe	S3E2 "The Cutting Edge"
1975	The Rookies	Midge Warren	S4E8 "Measure of Mercy"
1976	Medical Story	June	S1E11 "The Quality of Mercy"
1978	The Amazing Spider-Man	Carla Wilson	S1E2 "The Deadly Dust: Part 1"; S1E3 "The Deadly Dust: Part 2"
1978	Spider-Man Strikes Back	Carla Wilson (archive footage)	TV movie
1978	Everyday	Self	Series regular
1979	Turnabout	Valerie	S1E5 "Till Dad Do Us Part"
1981	The Misadventures of Sheriff Lobo	Jackie	S2E4 "Macho Man"
1981	Magnum, P.I.	Cindy Lewellyn	S1E13 "All Roads Lead to Floyd"
1982	The Greatest American Hero	Linda Harrison	S2E15 "The Devil and the Deep Blue Sea"
1982	I, Desire	Self	TV movie
1982–90	Not Necessarily the News	Frosty Kimelman	61 episodes
1983	Inspector Perez	Jane Langley	TV movie
1985	All-Star Blitz	Self (celebrity panelist)	3 episodes
1986	Airwolf	Alma Grace Harrison	S3E14 "Discovery"
1986	Celebrity Double Talk	Self (celebrity contestant)	5 episodes
1986–87	The $25,000 Pyramid	Self (celebrity contestant)	20 episodes
1986–91	The $100,000 Pyramid	Self (celebrity contestant)	10 episodes
1988	Blackout	Self (celebrity contestant)	5 episodes
1988	The 9th Annual ACE Awards	Self (presenter)	Television special
1988	The New Hollywood Squares	Self (panelist)	5 episodes
1988	Night Court	Wanda Chaney	S5E22 "Danny Got His Gun: Part 1"
1988	The 2nd Annual American Comedy Awards	Self (presenter)	Television special
1988	Relatively Speaking	Self (celebrity panelist)	25 episodes
1988	ABC Weekend Special	Garf's Mother	S11E3 "Runaway Ralph"
1989	Camp Midnite	Self	Episode #110
1989	The Pat Sajak Show	Self	Episodes #68 and 113
1989	Doogie Howser, M.D.	Ruth Favor	S1E9 "She Ain't Heavy, She's My Cousin"
1990	The Marsha Warfield Show	Self	Episode dated May 17, 1990
1990–91	Parker Lewis Can't Lose	Mrs. Lewis	10 episodes
1990–91	Totally Hidden Video	Self (host)	
1991	Krofft Late Night	Anne Caruthers	Television special
1992	On the Air	Sylvia Hudson	S1E5
1993	Major Dad	Jane Whitaker	S4E20 "Conduct Unbecoming"
1995	Night Stand with Dick Dietrick	Rhonda	S1E22 "Post Office Show"
1996	Duckman		S3E25 "Sperms of Endearment". Voice only
1997	The Angry Beavers	Tina/Older Woman (voices)	S1E9 "House Broken/Stinky Toe"
1997	Johnny Bravo	Fluffy/Woman (voices)	S1E9 "Substitute Teacher/A Wolf in Chick's Clothing/Intensive Care"

== Awards and nominations ==
- Cable Ace Award Actress in a Comedy Series for Not Necessarily the News 4 Nominations (1983, 1984, 1985, 1987)
