= The Dirt Bike Kid =

1985 film

- Directed by: Hoite C. Caston
- Screenplay by: David Brandes; Lewis Colick
- Story by: Julie Corman
- Produced by: Julie Corman
- Starring: Peter Billingsley; Stuart Pankin; Anne Bloom; Patrick Collins; Danny Breen
- Cinematography: Daniel Lacambre
- Edited by: Jeff Freeman
- Music by: Bill Bowersock; John Philip Shenale
- Production companies: Trinity Pictures; FilmDallas Pictures
- Distributed by: Concorde Pictures
- Release date: November 1, 1985
- Running time: 90 minutes
- Country: United States
- Language: English

The Dirt Bike Kid is a 1985 urban fantasy film directed by Hoite Caston, written by David Brandes and Lewis Colick, and starring Peter Billingsley, Stuart Pankin, Anne Bloom, Patrick Collins and Danny Breen. The film tells about a boy who discovers a magic dirt bike that has a mind of its own, with part of the film's story inspired by Jack and the Beanstalk.

== Plot ==
Jack Simmons (Peter Billingsley) lives with his widowed mother (Anne Bloom). She sends Jack to buy groceries with their last $50. Jack notices a Yamaha YZ-80 two-stroke racing motorcycle and buys it from Max (Gavin Allen). Jack quickly notices that the motorcycle is self-aware. His mother is furious that Jack spent her money on a dirt bike, and promptly confiscates the bike and sells it to a local shop owner named Mr. Zak (Al Evans), thus recouping her $50. However, the bike returns in the middle of a baseball game to visit Jack. Jack tells this to Mr. Zak, who says Jack can work off his debt by having himself and the bike make deliveries for him.

Jack also plays on a Little League team sponsored by the Doghouse, a hot dog joint owned by Mike (Patrick Collins) who was a lifetime friend of Jack's father and is trying to look out for Jack in the wake of his father's death. The Doghouse is experiencing serious financial problems and is being sought to be demolished by the town's banker Mr. Hodgkins (Stuart Pankin) in order to make way for a second Hodgkins Bank. One of his tellers is Mazie Clavell (Sage Parker) who is also a coach of the rival Little League team. She later quits when she sees Hodgkins as a ruthless businessman who advocates getting ahead at all costs, and begins dating Mike, whom she sees as an honest business owner who faces adversity squarely.

Jack and his friend Bo (Chad Sheets) use the bike to help uncover why Hodgkins is after the Doghouse, especially after hacking into the bank's computer they learn that the Doghouse's land would not make a very good location for Hodgkins' bank and that Mr. Hodgkins' personal account is not as sizable as the community is led to believe. Hodgkins learns of Jack's attempt to save the Doghouse and enlists the aid of Max (who is a player on his Little League team) who brings in a biker named Arthur "Big Slime" (Weasel Forshaw) and his biker gang who encountered Jack before.

When Mr. Hodgkins converges on Jack's house, Mr. Hodgkins calls in the local police force led by its chief of police Salt (John William Galt). Chief Salt orders his police officers to impound the dirt bike in exchange for Hodgkins not foreclosing on Salt's overextended mortgage at Hodgkins' Bank. However, Mazie and Mike come to Jack's aid by paying the impoundment fee for Jack to get his dirt bike back.

When the groundbreaking ceremony on the bank's construction is set to begin by having a bulldozer raze the Doghouse, Jack shows up with his Little League team who disrupts the event by getting into a pie fight with Max, Hodgkins and Big Slime's biker gang. The dirt bike then takes away a shocked Hodgkins while Jack is driving it, where Jack tells Hodgkins that he is aware of Hodgkins' and Mike's financial problems, and has an idea where all can benefit.

One year later, Hodgkins shows up in a goofy hot dog suit to commemorate the opening of a shopping mall that features a renovated Doghouse and the new Hodgkins Bank, now fully constructed. Bo, once unpopular with girls, is now admired by pretty girls. Jack's mom has found gainful employment. Mike and Mazie are now married and expecting their first baby. Salt now works as a security guard in the bank after having been presumably fired from his job by the town council for corruption. Big Slime (who is now wearing a shirt and tie and admits his true name is Arthur) has dissolved his biker gang and taken a job as a bank teller in the new Hodgkins Bank.

With the community lifted, the dirt bike's magic stops working for Jack, whose mother tells him it may have been magic for Jack only to help him out. Jack gives the bike to another little boy, and it appears the magic returns once again for another child.

== Cast ==
- Peter Billingsley as Jack Simmons, a boy who comes across a dirt bike with magic abilities.
- Stuart Pankin as Mr. Hodgkins, a banker that runs Hodgkins Bank.
- Anne Bloom as Janet Simmons, the mother of Jack.
- Patrick Collins as Mike, the proprietor of the Doghouse.
- Daniel Breen as Flaherty
- Sage Parker as Mazie Clavell, a bank teller who coaches a Little League team.
- Chad Sheets as Bo, Jack's friend
- Gavin Allen as Max, a kid from a rival Little League team that originally owned the dirt bike, picks on Jack, and sides with Hodgkins.
- Weasel Forshaw as Arthur "Big Slime", the leader of a biker gang who Max later enlists to help Hodgkins deal with Jack.
- John William Galt as Salt, the chief of police who Hodgkins enlists.
- Courtney Kraus as Beth
- Holly Schenk as Sue
- Al Evans as Mr. Zak, a shop owner

== Production ==
The film was the idea of Julie Corman. She said it was a combination of Jack and the Beanstalk and a real life hot dog stand near her children's nursery school in Pacific Palisades that was going to become a savings and loan business.

Corman says her husband Roger was reluctant to invest in the movie because it was a family film. "He suggested that I get some outside financing," says Julie Corman. "So I did. I wrote this story, developed the script, got the outside financing, and made the film."

The dirt bike used in the film is a 1985 Yamaha YZ80.

This would be the last theatrical film to star Peter Billingsley in a lead role to date; he largely moved to behind-the-scenes roles and small cameo appearances afterward until the 2022 direct-to-Internet special A Christmas Story Christmas.

== Release ==
The Dirt Bike Kid was released in the United States by Roger Corman's company Concorde Pictures in 1985. The film was also released in the Philippines by Movierama International on April 28, 1988.

Julie Corman said the movie was the first she had produced to lose money theatrically but claims it made over $3 million on video.

"I was so convinced that this would be a successful film," she recalled adding the movie "sold 100,000 video cassettes. It was our most successful film of the year. That was my introduction to family films."

== Home video ==
On November 18, 2014, The Dirt Bike Kid was released on DVD and Blu-ray by Scorpion Releasing, based on a new high-definition master.
