= Lucy Webb =

American comedian and actress

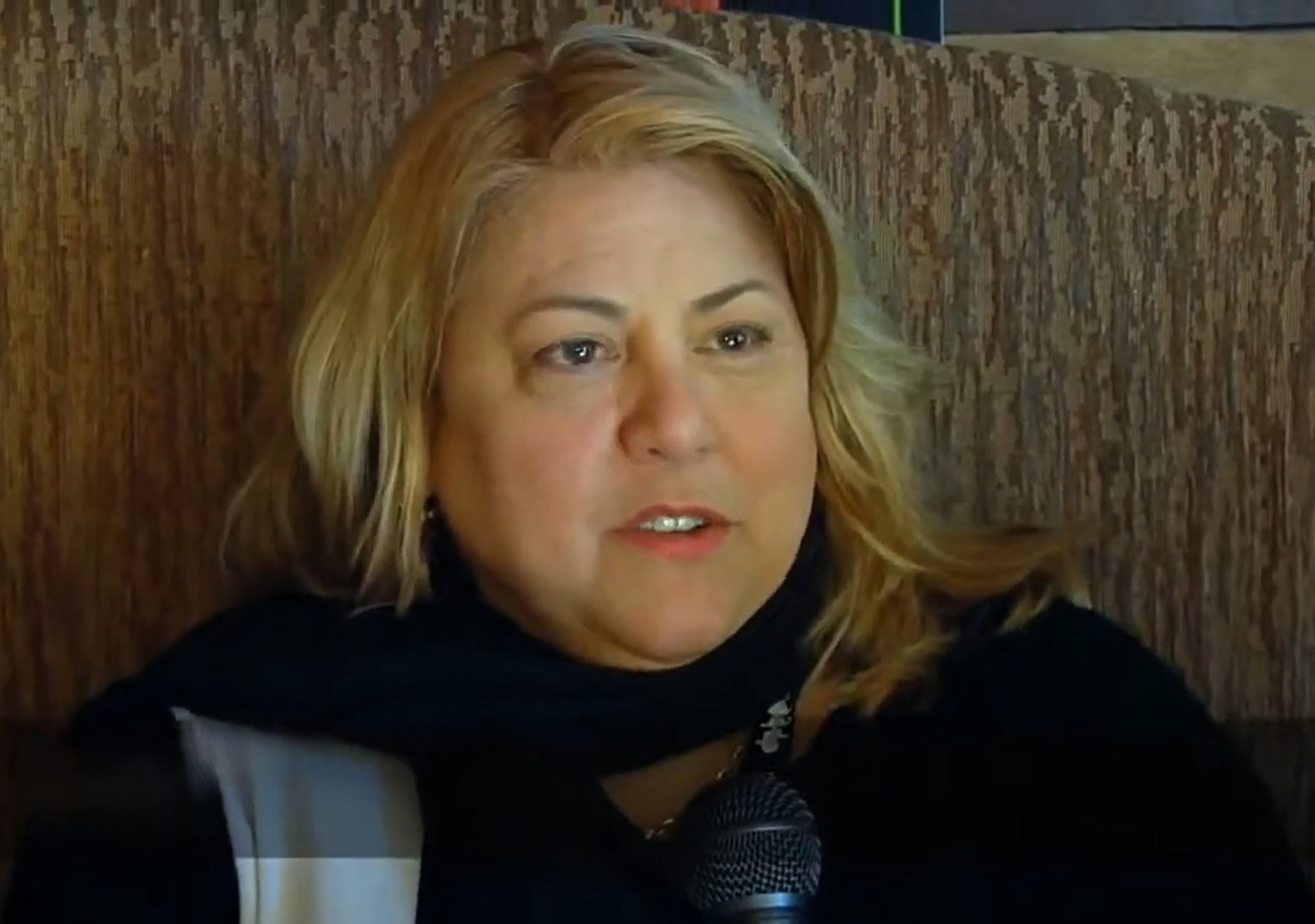
- Webb in 2014
- Occupations: Comedian; actress
- Years active: 1981–2011
- Spouse: Kevin Pollak (m. 1995; div. 2008)

Lucy Webb is an American comedian and actress, most famous for her work on the 1980s HBO series Not Necessarily the News. She has appeared in multiple films and television programs, including Curb Your Enthusiasm (Season 1, Episode 6) and Corrina, Corrina, where she portrayed Shirl.

== Life and career ==
Webb grew up in Cookeville, Tennessee and attended the University of Tennessee, where she studied drama for a few semesters and started writing comedy. She was an aide for then-Congressman Al Gore, and later moved to New York. She landed her first big role as a regular on the first season of the sitcom Private Benjamin in 1981, and later joined the HBO sketch comedy series Not Necessarily the News in 1984, replacing departing cast member Audrie J. Neenan. She won the ACE Award for best actress in a comedy series for five years running, and stayed on until the show ended in 1990. In 1984 she co-starred in the George Carlin HBO TV show Apt. 2C of which only the pilot episode was ever made.

Among other post-News roles, she starred in the short-lived Fox sitcom Charlie Hoover, with Sam Kinison and Tim Matheson, in 1991. She has been involved in the non-profit organization "Women in Film" since the late 1990s and served on its executive board.

She was married to actor Kevin Pollak. They separated in 2005, and in 2008, Pollak filed for a divorce.

== Filmography ==
=== Film ===
Year	Title	Role	Notes
1981	Full Moon High	Plane passenger	Feature film
1988	Big Business	Wenona	Feature film
1994	Corrina, Corrina	Shirl	Feature film
1998	Outside Ozona	Agent Ellen Deene	Feature film
1999	The Story of Us	Joanie Kirby	Feature film
2011	The Chaperone	Dr. Marjore	Feature film

=== Television ===
Year	Title	Role	Notes
1981–1982	Private Benjamin	Private Luanne Hubble	Series regular (20 episodes); Only appeared in Season 2 of the series
1982	Laugh Trax	Various characters	Episode: #1.1; Episode: "Rock Comedy"
1983–1990	Not Necessarily the News	Helen St. Thomas	Series regular (57 episodes)
1985	Apt. 2C	Patty Dunbar	Television movie (HBO); Pilot only
1987	Thirtysomething	Hostess/Valet Parking Attendant/Movie Ticket Seller	Episode: "LBut Not for Me"
1988	Maybe Baby a/k/a And Baby Makes Three	Fran	Television movie (NBC)
1989	It's Garry Shandling's Show	Lucy Coleman	Episode: "Big Brother; Episode: "Going, Going, Gone"
1989	L.A. Law	Yolanda Krieg	Episode: "The Unbearable Lightness of Boring"
1990	The American Film Institute Presents: TV or Not TV?	Guardian Yenta	Television movie
1991	Charlie Hoover	Helen Hoover	Series regular (7 episodes)
1997	The Don's Analyst a/k/a National Lampoon's The Don's Analyst	Dr. Susan Riceputo	Television movie (Showtime)
1997	The Underworld	Virginia Rhinehart	Television movie (NBC)
2000	Curb your Enthusiasm	Phyllis	Episode: "The Wire"
