= Peter Billingsley =

American actor and filmmaker (born 1971)

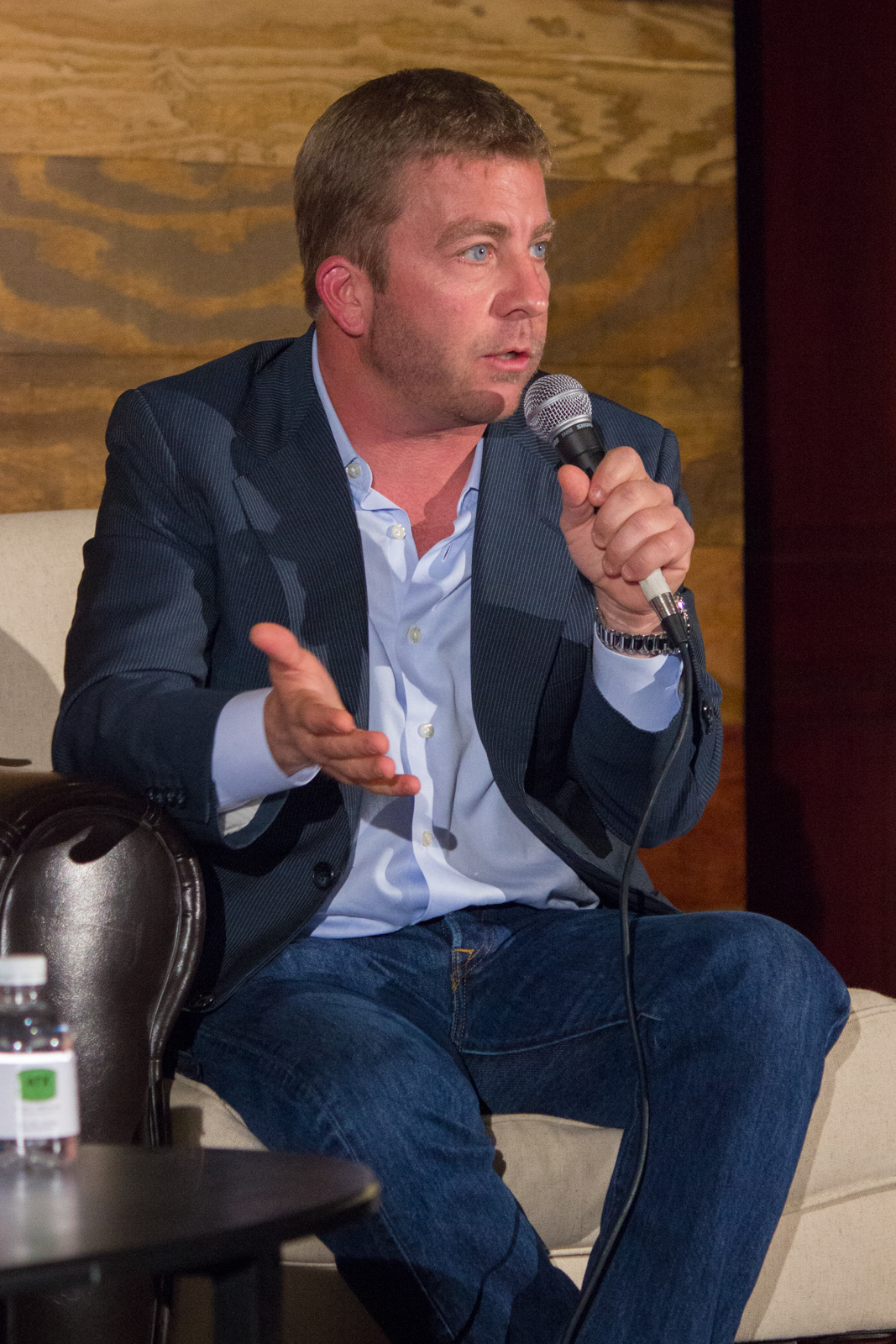
- Billingsley at the 2014 ATX TV Festival for Sullivan & Son
- Born: Peter Michaelsen (Note: "Peter Michaelsen" and "Peter Billingsley-Michaelsen" has been disputed on which is his birth name.); April 16, 1971 (age 55); New York City, U.S.
- Occupations: Actor, filmmaker
- Years active: 1973–present
- Spouse: Elizabeth Bains (m. 2015)
- Children: 2

Peter Billingsley (born April 16, 1971), also known as Peter Michaelsen and Peter Billingsley-Michaelsen, is an American actor and filmmaker. He is best known for portraying Ralphie Parker in A Christmas Story and A Christmas Story Christmas. He also played Jack Simmons in The Dirt Bike Kid, Billy in Death Valley, and Messy Marvin in a series of commercials for Hershey's Syrup in the 1980s. While an infant, he began acting in television commercials.

== Early life ==
Peter was born on April 16, 1971, in New York City. His father, Alwin Michaelsen, is a financial consultant, and his mother, Gail, was once Alwin's secretary. She is the niece of Stork Club owner Sherman Billingsley, and the cousin of Glenn Billingsley, who was married to actress Barbara Billingsley.

All five of the children in the family had acting careers when they were young. The older Billingsleys, Dina and Win, had the briefest acting careers, working mostly in commercials, with minor guest spots on television shows. Peter's older sister, Melissa, is best known for her role as Maxx Davis on Me and Maxx. Peter's older brother, Neil, began playing Danny Walton on the daytime soap opera Search for Tomorrow in 1975 and has had numerous roles in commercials and guest shots on TV series.

Peter Billingsley received his early education from a combination of tutors, public schools, and private institutions (including the Professional Children's School in New York City), Phoenix Country Day School in Paradise Valley, Arizona and Longview Elementary School in Phoenix and eventually passed his California High School Proficiency Exam (CHSPE) at age 14. He seems to have also attended some public secondary schools prior to passing the CHSPE, including Arcadia High School (in Phoenix).

Billingsley was a spokesman for the young-astronaut program and was present in 1986 at NASA's Kennedy Space Center in Florida during the Space Shuttle Challenger disaster.

== Career ==
Billingsley's first acting role was when he was 2 in a 1973 Geritol commercial. He went on to star in about 120 television advertisements throughout the 1970s and early 1980s. At 12 he was quoted as saying, "After 100 [commercials], you lose count." He was best known for a series of commercials for Hershey's chocolate syrup in which he portrayed the character Messy Marvin. One of Billingsley's earliest film roles was in 1978's If Ever I See You Again, written and directed by Joseph Brooks.

His role in 1981's Paternity opposite Burt Reynolds earned a nomination for "Best Young Comedian – Motion Picture or Television" at the Young Artist Awards. In 1981, he appeared in Honky Tonk Freeway. In 1982, Billingsley starred in several features, including Death Valley, Massarati and the Brain, and the made-for-TV movie Memories Never Die with Lindsay Wagner and his sister, Melissa. He had a featured guest role as Gideon Hale on Little House on the Prairie, began a three-year stint as a co-host on NBC's popular Real People (for which he earned another Young Artist Award nomination), and hosted a two-episode offshoot of the show called Real Kids.

In 1983, Billingsley starred in A Christmas Story, based on Jean Shepherd's In God We Trust, All Others Pay Cash, which built its audience slowly over the years and is now broadcast each year for 24 hours from Christmas Eve until Christmas Day on sister cable networks TBS and TNT. Billingsley was the first boy to audition for the main role, but Director Bob Clark didn't want to hire him until after an exhaustive three-month search had been conducted. The film earned Billingsley another Young Artist Award nomination, and is arguably the one role with which he is most associated. He has been quoted as saying that people still approach him on the street, only to say "you'll shoot your eye out, kid!" After about 40 years, he reprised the role in a sequel film titled A Christmas Story Christmas directed by Clay Kaytis for HBO Max.

In 1984, Billingsley starred in an adaptation of The Hoboken Chicken Emergency with Dick Van Patten and Gabe Kaplan, a special Thanksgiving episode of the PBS series WonderWorks. He appeared on a "Super Teen" special edition of Family Feud, and on Celebrity Hot Potato.

As the late 1980s approached, Billingsley's acting career slowed. He made guest appearances on Who's the Boss?, Punky Brewster, The Wonder Years, and Highway to Heaven. He appeared in The Dirt Bike Kid (for which he won a Young Artist Award), Russkies, and Beverly Hills Brats.

The early 1990s had Billingsley tackling older roles such as a would-be athlete who gets hooked on steroids in the CBS Schoolbreak Special The Fourth Man. On the project he formed a close friendship with Vince Vaughn. His next Schoolbreak Special appearance was in The Writing on the Wall (1994), starring Hal Linden as a rabbi who teaches three boys about the horrors of intolerance after they are caught defacing his home, temple, and car with swastikas and antisemitic graffiti. Billingsley was nominated for an Emmy Award for the role.

=== Other work ===
The most notable of his later film acting assignments was Arcade (1993), in which he starred as a teenage "virtual reality" addict; he worked as the post-production supervisor, credited as Peter Michaelsen. He began working behind the scenes more often. Known as Peter Michaelsen, he was assistant editor on Knights, a film which featured Kris Kristofferson. In 1994, he starred in, wrote, and directed (credited as Peter Billingsley) the short film The Sacred Fire, and credited as Peter Michaelsen as the executive producer. The film won an Academy of Science Fiction, Fantasy, and Horror Films' Golden Scroll Award.

His career behind the scenes continued, including work on The Discovery Channel's A.R.K.: The New Adventures of Animal Rescue Kids, The X Show, Made, and Elf, in which he has a cameo appearance.

In 2001, he was nominated for an Emmy Award as co-executive producer for the show Dinner for Five. In 2005, he helped produce the movie Zathura. He was an executive producer for the Universal Pictures production The Break-Up in which he had a small acting role, as Andrew, appearing alongside frequent collaborator Jon Favreau. Billingsley served as executive producer on director Favreau's Iron Man feature film; he also acted in the film playing William Ginter Riva, a scientist who works for Obadiah Stane; he reprised the role later in 2019 in the film Spider-Man: Far From Home. Billingsley, Favreau, and Vaughn appeared in Four Christmases (2008). Couples Retreat (2009) starring Favreau and Vaughn was Billingsley's first major film as director and was followed by his second directorial effort Term Life, which also starred Vaughn.

Billingsley's acting career continued, as well, with roles in Family Reunion: A Relative Nightmare, Elf, L.A. Heat, and No Deposit, No Return, which was voted Best Feature Film at the New York International Independent Film and Video Festival in 2000. He took an acting part in an experimental film for the new Maxivision 48 projection system which was developed by Dean Goodhill.

Billingsley released a CD titled Christmas Stories...Christmas Songs on Run For Cover Records in 1999 with longtime friend Brian Evans. He signed on as executive producer of a musical adaptation of A Christmas Story that opened in Seattle in December 2010. He said he was "honored to be a part of this project and looks forward to bringing the play to more stages... Just think about the idea of a leg-lamp kickline."

He served as a co-producer of the musical adaption of A Christmas Story when it hit Broadway in 2012. "The idea of a musical was very, very inspiring to me because it's really an extension of the story," Billingsley said in a November 2012 Playbill interview.

== Personal life ==
Billingsley married Elizabeth "Buffy" Bains, a ballet teacher, in 2015. They have two children.

== Filmography ==
=== Film ===
Year	Title	Role	Notes	Ref
1978	If Ever I See You Again	Child		
1981	Honky Tonk Freeway	Little Billy		
1981	Paternity	Tad		
1982	Death Valley	Billy		
1983	A Christmas Story	Ralphie Parker		
1985	The Dirt Bike Kid	Jack Simmons		
1987	Russkies	Adam		
1989	Beverly Hills Brats	Scooter		
1993	Arcade	Nick		
1994	The Sacred Fire	Kyle Baker		
2000	No Deposit, No Return			
2001	Made	None	Co-producer	
2003	Elf	Ming Ming the elf	Also co-producer	
2005	Zathura: A Space Adventure	None	Co-producer	
2006	The Break-Up	Andrew	Also executive producer	
2006	Wild West Comedy Show	Himself	Also co-producer	
2008	Iron Man	William Ginter Riva	Also executive producer	
2008	Four Christmases	Ticket Agent	Also executive producer	
2009	Couples Retreat	None	Director	
2013	A Case of You	Scott		
2015	Prescription Thugs	None	Executive producer	
2016	Term Life	None	Director	
2019	Spider-Man: Far From Home	William Ginter Riva		
2022	A Christmas Story Christmas	Ralphie Parker	Also co-producer and story writer	
2025	Broke	None	Producer	

=== Television ===
Year	Title	Role	Notes	Ref
1982	Little House on the Prairie	Gideon Hale	Episode: "No Beast So Fierce"	
1982	Massarati and the Brain	Christopher 'The Brain' Massarati	TV movie	
1982	Memories Never Die	Shawn Tilford	TV movie	
1982–1984	Real People	Himself (host)		
1984	The Hoboken Chicken Emergency	Arthur Bobowicz	TV movie	
1985	Who's the Boss?	Bobby Walsh	Episode: "Double Date"	
1985	The O'Briens	Son	TV movie	
1985	Highway to Heaven	Ridley	Episode: "The Monster, Part 1", "The Monster, Part 2"	
1985	Punky Brewster	Richmond Matzie	Episode: "Christmas Shoplifting"	
1986	Tall Tales & Legends	Kevin	Episode: "Pecos Bill"	
1986	Punky Brewster	Richmond Matzie	Episode: "Girls Will Be Boys"	
1986	The Last Frontier	Marty Adamson	TV movie	
1987	Carly's Web	Robert Krantz Jr.	TV movie	
1990	CBS Schoolbreak Special	Joey Martelli	Episode: "The Fourth Man"	
1993	The Wonder Years	Micky Spiegel	Episodes: "Summer, Part 1", "Independence Day, Part 2"	
1994	CBS Schoolbreak Special	Tony	Episode: "The Writing on the Wall"	
1995	Family Reunion: A Relative Nightmare	Mark McKenna Jr.	TV movie	
1995–1997	Sherman Oaks	Billy Baker	Contract role	
1999	L.A. Heat	Lance Allan	Episode: "Obsession"	
1999	The X Show		Senior field producer	
2000	Who's Watching Who?	Starring	TV movie	
2000	The New Adventures of A.R.K.	None	Writer (Episode: "An Elephant Remembers")	
2001–2004	Dinner for Five	None	Executive producer: 20 episodes	
2003	Trigger Happy TV		Field producer – final year	
2008	Dinner for Five	Guest	Executive producer	
2012	Art of Conflict	None	Producer	
2012–2014	Sullivan & Son	None	Executive producer: All episodes; Writer: 33 episodes; Director: 6 episodes	
2013	Pursuit of the Truth	Himself	As judge: 1 episode Producer: 10 episodes	
2015–2021	F Is for Family	None	Executive producer	
2020	Challenger: The Final Flight	Himself	Spokesperson, Young Astronaut Program	

== Awards and nominations ==
Year	Association	Category	Work	Result	ref
1983	Young Artist Award	Best Leading Young Actor in a Feature Film	A Christmas Story	Nominated	
1985	Young Artist Award	Best Leading Young Actor in a Feature Film	The Dirt Bike Kid	Won	

== Bibliography ==
- Dye, David. Child and Youth Actors: Filmography of Their Entire Careers, 1914–1985. Jefferson, NC: McFarland & Co., 1988, p. 18.
- Holmstrom, John. The Moving Picture Boy: An International Encyclopaedia from 1895 to 1995. Norwich, Michael Russell, 1996, p. 386.
