= Jonathan Janssen =

New Zealand basketball player

No. 8 – Tokyo Hachioji Bee Trains
- Position: Power forward
- League: B.League

Personal information
- Born: 10 April 1995 (age 31) Pretoria, South Africa
- Listed height: 205 cm (6 ft 9 in)
- Listed weight: 105 kg (231 lb)

Career information
- High school: Mountain Creek State (Sunshine Coast, Queensland); Mt Zion Baptist Christian School (Baltimore, Maryland)
- College: Cleveland State (2015–2016); Hawaii Pacific (2016–2019)
- NBA draft: 2019: undrafted
- Playing career: 2019–present

Career history
- 2019: Canterbury Rams
- 2019: KB Prishtina
- 2020: Sunshine Coast Phoenix
- 2021: Hawke's Bay Hawks
- 2021–2022: BBC Gréngewald Hueschtert
- 2022–2023: Sunshine Coast Phoenix
- 2023–2024: BBC US Heffingen
- 2024: Rockingham Flames
- 2025: Otago Nuggets
- 2025–present: Tokyo Hachioji Bee Trains

Career highlights
- Luxembourg Nationale 2 champion (2024); 2× Third-team All-PacWest (2018, 2019)

Jonathan Peter Janssen (born 10 April 1995) is a New Zealand–Australian professional basketball player for the Tokyo Hachioji Bee Trains of the Japanese B.League. Born in South Africa, Janssen grew up in New Zealand and Australia and played college basketball in the United States. He played a season for the Cleveland State Vikings before transferring to Hawaii Pacific in 2016 where he played three seasons. He has played as a professional in New Zealand, Kosovo, Australia and Luxembourg. In 2021, he made his debut for the New Zealand Tall Blacks.

== Early life ==
Janssen was born in Pretoria, South Africa, before moving to New Zealand with his family at the age of three. He attended Northcross Intermediate in North Shore, New Zealand, before moving to Australia for high school at the age of 13. He attended Mountain Creek State High School in Sunshine Coast, Queensland. His hometowns are listed as Mountain Creek and Noosa Heads, both suburbs on the Sunshine Coast. He played a variety of sports as a child, including tennis, volleyball, golf, soccer, and basketball.

In 2013, Janssen committed to Cleveland State University and then had a prep season in the U.S. at Mt Zion Baptist Christian School in Baltimore, Maryland.

== College career ==
After redshirting the 2014–15 season, Janssen debuted for the Cleveland State Vikings in the 2015–16 season. In 11 games, he totalled nine points and eleven rebounds.

Janssen transferred to Hawaii Pacific in the NCAA Division II in 2016. In 32 games in 2016–17, he averaged 5.7 points and 3.1 rebounds in 14.2 minutes per game.

As a junior in 2017–18, Janssen started all 28 games and averaged 13.6 points and 7.0 rebounds in 32.4 minutes per game. He scored a career-high 25 points against Holy Names on 5 January 2018. He subsequently earned third-team All-PacWest.

As a senior in 2018–19, Janssen led the Sharks in scoring (12.1) and rebounding (5.9) and had a season-high 23 points in a win against Academy of Art in February 2019. He subsequently earned third-team All-PacWest for the second straight year.

== Professional career ==
In March 2019, Janssen signed with the Canterbury Rams of the New Zealand National Basketball League (NZNBL) for the 2019 season. He averaged 6 points and 5 rebounds per game and helped the Rams reach the Final Four.

In August 2019, Janssen signed with KB Prishtina of the Kosovo Superleague. He appeared in two Superleague games and two BCL games to start the 2019–20 season before being released by the team on 21 October.

Janssen had re-signed with the Rams for the 2020 New Zealand NBL season but later joined the Sunshine Coast Phoenix for the 2020 Queensland State League (QSL) season. He averaged 16.1 points and 10.2 rebounds per game.

In March 2021, Janssen joined the Hawke's Bay Hawks for the 2021 New Zealand NBL season. He played off the bench and averaged 8.6 points and 6.2 rebounds per game.

Janssen joined BBC Gréngewald Hueschtert of the Nationale 2 in Luxembourg for the 2021–22 season. He averaged 21.9 points, 12.6 rebounds and 2.0 assists per game.

Janssen returned to the Sunshine Coast Phoenix, now in the NBL1 North, for the 2022 season. He averaged 15.6 points and 8.9 rebounds per game.

Janssen remained on the Sunshine Coast during the off-season and re-joined the Phoenix for the 2023 NBL1 North season. In 19 games, he averaged 15.8 points, 9.5 rebounds, 2.6 assists and 1.1 steals per game.

For the 2023–24 season, Janssen returned to Luxembourg to play for BBC US Heffingen in the Nationale 2. He helped the team win the Nationale 2 championship and earn promotion to the Luxembourg Basketball League. In 20 games, he averaged 26.4 points, 12.6 rebounds and 1.3 assists per game.

In April 2024, Janssen joined the Rockingham Flames for the rest of the 2024 NBL1 West season. He was sidelined late in the season. In nine games between 27 April and 14 June, he averaged 18.56 points, 8.0 rebounds, 1.56 assists, 1.11 steals and 1.22 blocks per game.

On 24 February 2025, Janssen signed with the Otago Nuggets for the 2025 New Zealand NBL season. In 18 games, he averaged 18.5 points, 7.7 rebounds and 1.4 assists per game.

On 28 June 2025, Janssen signed with the Tokyo Hachioji Bee Trains of the Japanese B.League.

== National team ==
In February 2021, Janssen debuted for the New Zealand Tall Blacks in a FIBA Asia Cup qualifier in Cairns against Australia. A number of regular Tall Blacks players were unavailable due to Australian NBL commitments, and due to the COVID-19 pandemic, quarantine periods also forced the Tall Blacks to create an Australian-based team, with many being based in Queensland. Janssen had eight points and nine rebounds in 25 minutes in an 81–52 loss.

== Personal life ==
Janssen is the son of Wim and Colleen Janssen, and he has one brother and two sisters.

Janssen holds a New Zealand passport and he is a dual citizen of Australia and New Zealand.
