= Shaquille Morris =

American basketball player (born 1994)

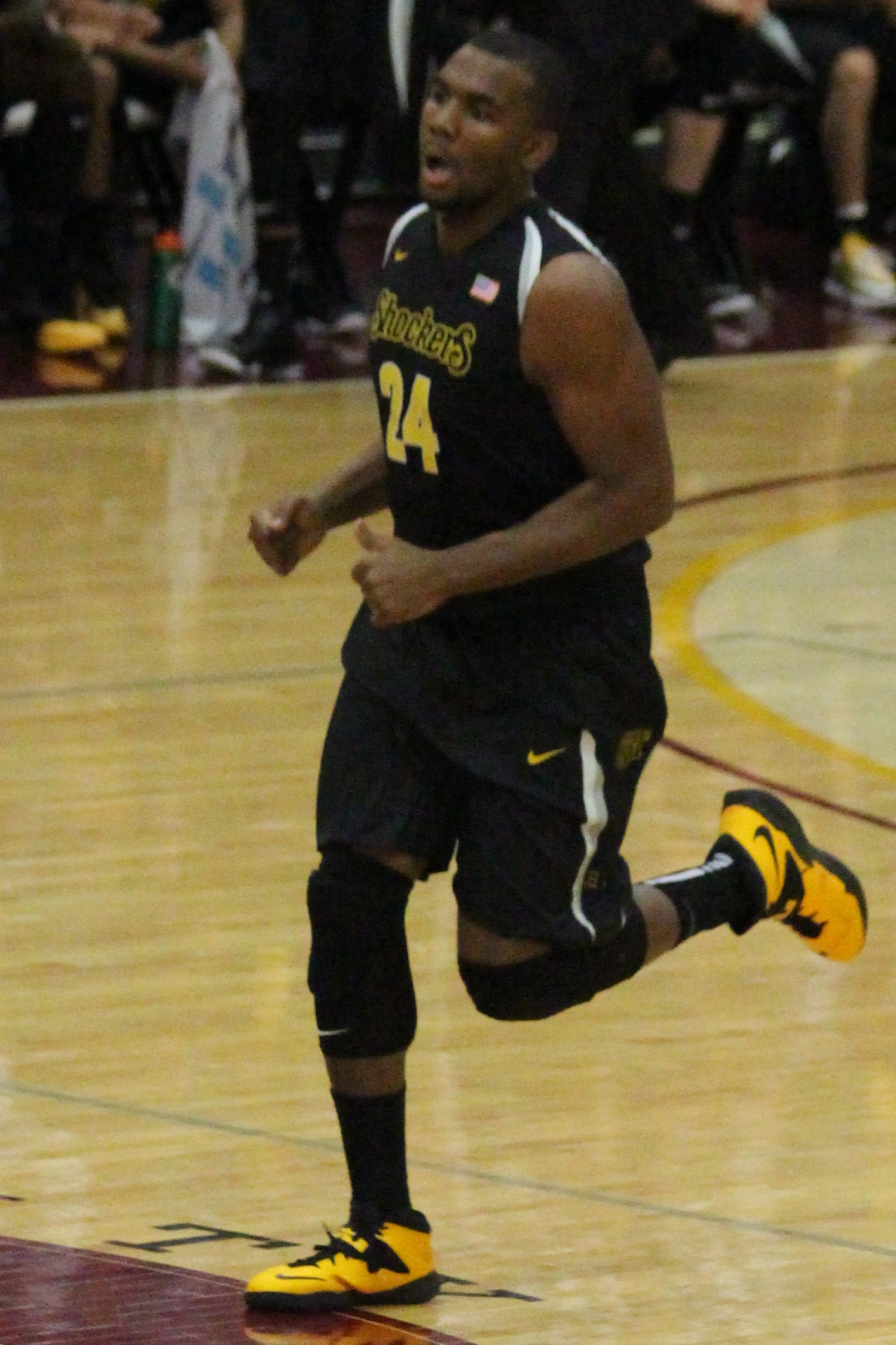
- Morris with Wichita State, 2015

Profile
- Position: Offensive tackle

Personal information
- Born: February 23, 1994 (age 32); Houston, Texas
- Listed height: 6 ft 8 in (2.03 m)
- Listed weight: 279 lb (127 kg)

Career information
- High school: Edmond Memorial (Edmond, Oklahoma)
- College: Wichita State (2014–2018)

Career history
- Houston Roughnecks (2023)*
- * Offseason or practice squad member only

Shaquille Morris
Career information
- NBA draft: 2018: undrafted
- Playing career: 2018–present
- Position: Power forward / center

Career history
- 2018: San-en NeoPhoenix
- 2018–2019: Kyoto Hannaryz
- 2019–2020: Tokyo Hachioji Bee Trains

Career highlights
- First-team All-AAC (2018); Third-team All-MVC (2017)

Shaquille Morris (born February 23, 1994) is an American professional basketball and football player. and played college basketball for the Wichita State University. He played basketball professionally for the San-en NeoPhoenix, Kyoto Hannaryz, and Tokyo Hachioji Bee Trains.

== College career ==
Morris dominated over high school competition due to his large build. He was recruited to Wichita State by assistant coach Chris Jans. Morris redshirted his freshman season but missed many practices for minor ailments. Coach Gregg Marshall said to him in December 2013 that he needed to get a medical thesaurus for all the made-up conditions he had. When he did start logging minutes for the Shockers, he was frequently in trouble with Marshall and nearly got kicked off the team. As his college career went on, the two developed a more productive relationship.

Morris was named to the Third Team All-Missouri Valley Conference as a junior. He averaged 9.8 points and 5.1 rebounds per game that season. Morris declared for the 2016 NBA draft but eventually returned to school. On February 1 in an overtime loss to Temple, Morris broke the 1,000 points barrier and posted 24 points and nine rebounds. He scored 23 points and grabbed 13 rebounds in a 93–86 win over Temple on February 14 in what Marshall considered to be his best game. The following game, he had 13 points in a win against top-five Cincinnati and was named AAC player of the week. As a senior, Morris averaged 14.2 points, 5.5 rebounds, and 1.6 blocks per game. He posted 15.7 points per game in conference play. He was named to the First Team All-American Athletic Conference.

In October 2020, Morris claimed that coach Marshall shoved and punched him in the head during a practice in 2015, sparking an investigation against his former coach.

== Professional basketball career ==
After going undrafted in the 2018 NBA draft, on July 29, 2018, Morris joined the Israeli team Bnei Herzliya, signing a one-year deal with an option for another one. However, on August 16, 2018, he parted ways with Herzliya before appearing in any games for them. His contract was bought out by the San-en NeoPhoenix of the top-tier Japanese B.League. On December 15, 2019, Morris signed with the Tokyo Hachioji Bee Trains.

== Professional football career ==
Morris was assigned to the Houston Roughnecks of the XFL on January 6, 2023. He was released on June 21, 2023.
