= Alex Jones (basketball) =

American basketball player (born 1987)

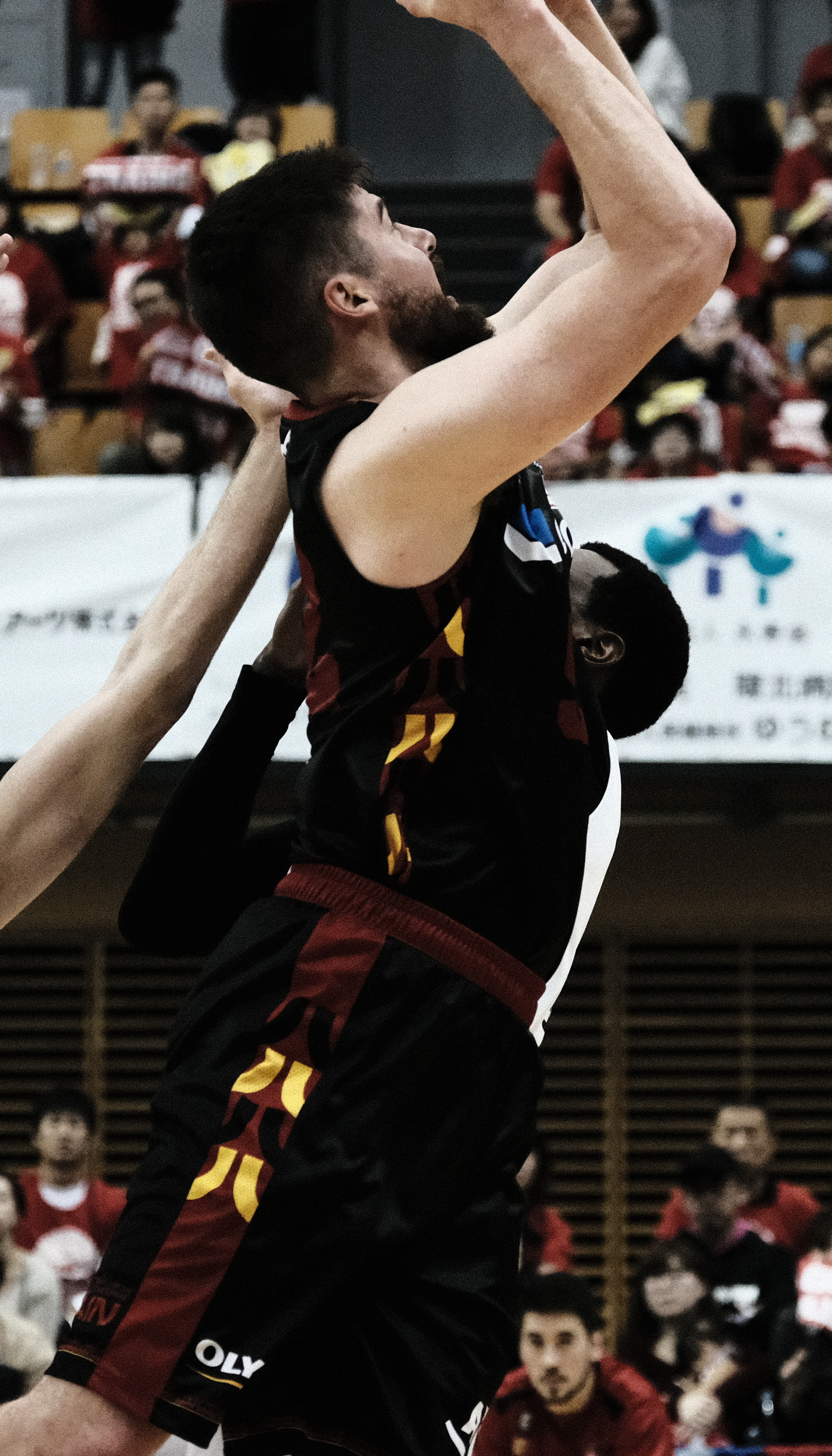

Free agent
- Position: Center

Personal information
- Born: October 17, 1987 (age 39)
- Listed height: 6 ft 8 in (2.03 m)
- Listed weight: 215 lb (98 kg)

Career information
- High school: Arcadia (Phoenix, Arizona)
- College: Scottsdale CC (2007–2009); Seattle (2009–2011)
- NBA draft: 2011: undrafted
- Playing career: 2011–2022

Career history
- 2011: Stadio Italiano
- 2012: Amicale Steesel
- 2012–2013: BV Chemnitz 99
- 2013–2016: Toyotsu Fighting Eagles Nagoya
- 2016–2019: Tokyo Hachioji Trains
- 2019: Koshigaya Alphas
- 2019–2020: Ibaraki Robots
- 2020: Nishinomiya Storks
- 2020–2021: Earthfriends Tokyo Z
- 2021–2022: Iwate Big Bulls

Career highlights
- NBDL MVP (2013–14); NBDL Best Five (2013–14); 2xNBDL FG Pct Leader (2013–15); 2xB3 League Best Five (2016–18)

Alexander Bryant Jones (born October 17, 1987) is an American professional basketball player who last played for Iwate Big Bulls in Japan. He played college basketball for Seattle Redhawks.

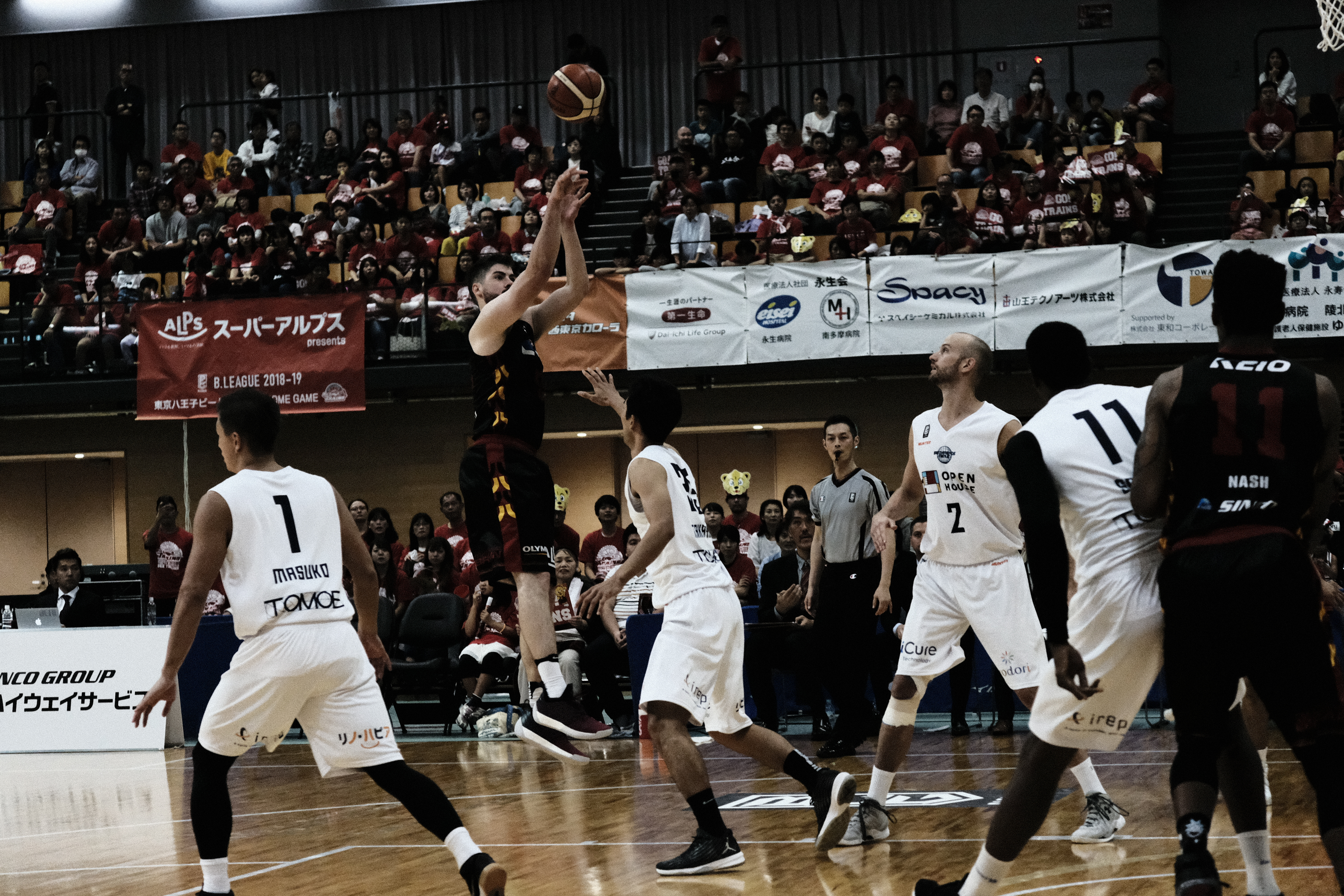
Jones with Hachioji
