= Not Necessarily the News =

HBO news satire series

- Created by: John Moffitt
- Country of origin: United States
- No. of seasons: 8
- No. of episodes: 72

Production
- Running time: 30 minutes

Original release
- Network: HBO
- Release: January 3, 1983 – August 26, 1990

Not Necessarily the News (shortened as NNTN) is an American satirical sketch comedy series first aired on HBO in September 1982 as a comedy special, and then as a series from 1983 to 1990. For most of the run, the series featured Anne Bloom, Danny Breen, Rich Hall, Mitchell Laurance, Stuart Pankin and Lucy Webb. For the final season, the series switched to a live, up-to-the-minute format and also included reports from many other correspondents including Will Durst, Merrill Markoe, Richard Rosen and Harry Shearer.

The series was the birthplace of Rich Hall's sniglets, which spawned a number of books. It also included early appearances from Jan Hooks, and, among the many writers the show employed, was the first credited professional television writing gig for Conan O'Brien, Greg Daniels, Al Jean and Mike Reiss. The show was considered an inspiration and a predecessor to future news satirical programs like The Daily Show, The Colbert Report, and Last Week Tonight, among others.

== Synopsis ==
Not Necessarily the News featured sketches, parody news items, commercial parodies, and humorous bits made from overdubbing or editing actual news footage. It was based on the British series Not the Nine O'Clock News that had ended earlier in 1982.

The original format lasted until May 1989, when the series switched to a live, up-to-the-minute format in the style of Saturday Night Live's "Weekend Update" and Friday's "Friday Edition". NNTN came to an end in December the following year with its final episode, a "Not Necessarily the Year in Review" special for 1990.

== Cast ==
- Anne Bloom (1982–1990), as Frosty Kimelman
- Rich Hall (1982–1990), who did a regular feature on "sniglets".
- Tommy Koenig (1982 pilot)
- Sam McMurray (1982 pilot)
- Audrie J. Neenan (1982–1984), as Jacqueline Pennell
- Danny Breen (1983–1990), as Steve Casper
- Mitchell Laurance (1983–1990), as news reporter Pete Kimelman.
- Stuart Pankin (1983–1990), as anchorman Bob Charles.
- Lucy Webb (1984–1990), as Helen St. Thomas
- Annabelle Gurwitch (1989–1990)
- Tom Parks (1989–1990)
- Merrill Markoe (1989–1990)
- Richard Rosen (1989–1990)
- Joe Guppy (1989–1990)
- Will Durst (1989–1990)
- Jon Ross (1989–1990)
- Harry Shearer (1989–1990)

== Theme and episodes ==
The show's first theme song was the instrumental bridge of Eric Clapton's cover of "Motherless Children". It was switched to "Hooray for the City" by Jack Mack and the Heart Attack in 1985.

The series also spawned two specialized episodes that aired as occasional specials: Not Necessarily the Year in Review, and Not Necessarily the Sniglets.
