= Charlie Hoover =

1991 American TV series

- Genre: Sitcom
- Created by: Ian Gurvitz
- Starring: Tim Matheson; Lucy Webb; Julie Hayden; Michael Manasseri; Leslie Engel; Sam Kinison
- Ending theme: Joey Carbone; Dennis E. Belfield
- Composers: Joey Carbone; Robert Crew
- Country of origin: United States
- Original language: English
- No. of seasons: 1
- No. of episodes: 7

Production
- Executive producers: Ian Gurvitz; Marc Gurvitz; Lillah McCarthy
- Camera setup: Multi-camera
- Running time: 22 minutes
- Production companies: Ian Gurvitz Productions; Brillstein-Grey Entertainment; New World Television; TriStar Television

Original release
- Network: Fox
- Release: November 9 – December 28, 1991

Charlie Hoover is an American sitcom which aired on Fox from November 9 to December 28, 1991, starring Tim Matheson in the lead role and Sam Kinison, Lucy Webb and Bill Maher.

== Synopsis ==
Charlie Hoover (Tim Matheson) is a man who just reached middle age when one day the voice within his head materializes in the form of Hugh (Sam Kinison), a foot-high miniature alter ego. Hugh guides Charlie on the path to getting his life in order.

== Cast ==
- Tim Matheson as Charlie Hoover
- Lucy Webb as Helen Hoover
- Julie Hayden as Doris
- Michael Manasseri as Paul Hoover
- Leslie Engel as Emily Hoover
- Sam Kinison as Hugh
- Bill Maher as Elliot Weedle
- Kevin McCarthy as Mr. Culbertson

== Background ==
Kinison revealed he was working on a pilot for Fox called The Brave New World of Charlie Hoover early in 1991. Kinison had appeared on Fox's Married... with Children in a late 1989 episode. Once the show was picked up, Kinison joked that he took the role to prove he could do family entertainment, and that he had been "falsely persecuted" that he could not. Kinison admitted he had to reform his hard-partying lifestyle for the routine of making the sitcom, and almost lost the show after failing to show up for a scheduled appearance on The Joan Rivers Show, which he originally blamed on eating "bad Chinese food", but later admitted was due to partying.

Fox put the show on its Saturday night lineup in November 1991 as part of mid-fall schedule changes, including the cancellation of low-rated Ultimate Challenge. It was among the lowest-rated primetime shows of the 1991–92 United States season. Though the show was cancelled after seven episodes, Fox was interested in having Kinison do a variety show, but he died in a car crash in April 1992.

== Episodes ==
No.	Title	Directed by	Written by	Original release date
1	"Happy Birthday to Hugh"	Peter Baldwin	Ian Gurvitz	November 9, 1991
On his depressing 40th birthday, Charlie meets his alter ego—a pint-sized loudmouth in a long coat—who helps him start to get it together, and helps him to get his promotion.
2	"Happy Anniversary"	Jeff Melman	Adam Markowitz & Bill Freiberger	November 16, 1991
To celebrate his anniversary right, Charlie takes Hugh's advice and sets up a romantic anniversary celebration; unfortunately it is the same night he must make a business dinner.
3	"Two for the Road"	Jeff Melman	Art Everett & Nelson Costello	November 23, 1991
Hugh is horrified when Charlie decides it may be time to get a vasectomy.
4	"Mother-in-Law"	Rob Schiller	David Chambers	November 30, 1991
With Hugh's help, Charlie learns how to deal with his mother-in-law.
5	"Out of the Frying Pan"	Jeff Melman	Joe Toplyn	December 7, 1991
Emily has a problem with her cooking teacher and Doris has a blind date.
6	"Old Flame"	David Trainer	Stephen Paymer	December 21, 1991
A co-worker chases Charlie in search of a fling, which is something Charlie also needs because two months earlier Helen left with the kids.
7	"Roll One for Ed"	David Trainer	Scott Buck	December 28, 1991
When a co-worker dies, Charlie travels to Atlantic City to complete the man's dream of taking $100 and gambling it away.
