= Elliott Hagen =

- Born: Mooloolaba, Australia
- School: Mountain Creek State High School
- University: University of Queensland

Rugby union career
- Position(s): Wing, Fullback
Amateur team(s)
Years	Team	Apps	(Points)
2012–2013	University of Queensland		
Provincial / State sides
Years	Team	Apps	(Points)
2013	Bay of Plenty	5	(0)
- Correct as of 14 October 2013

Elliott Hagen (born in Mooloolaba, Australia) is a former Australian rugby union player. He played in the fullback (and occasionally wing) position for provincial side Bay of Plenty. Hagen has previously played for Australian club University of Queensland before heading to New Zealand ahead of 2013 season's ITM Cup with Bay of Plenty.

== Playing career ==
Hagen spent two years at University, joining the Brisbane-based club when his two-year stint in the Army and Army Reserve finished. Stationed with the Royal Australian Regiment at Townsville, he left the Army two months before he was due to be deployed to Afghanistan. Hagen soon left the reigning Premier Rugby champion University mid-season to, in part with the Sunshine Coast club Maroochydore.

Hagen was then featured in the Rebels development team as well as being included in the Combined Country extended squad that took on the British and Irish Lions. He then headed to New Zealand after being signed by ITM Cup side Bay of Plenty. Hagen recorded five appearances for the side.
