= Massarati and the Brain =

- Genre: Adventure; Action
- Written by: George Kirgo
- Directed by: Harvey Hart
- Starring: Christopher Lee; Daniel Pilon; Peter Billingsley; Christopher Hewett; Ann Turkel; Markie Post
- Music by: Billy Goldenberg
- Country of origin: United States
- Original language: English

Production
- Executive producers: Aaron Spelling; E. Duke Vincent
- Producer: Charles B. Fitzsimons
- Cinematography: Archie R. Dalzell
- Editor: Sidney Katz
- Running time: 120 mins.
- Production company: Aaron Spelling Productions

Original release
- Network: ABC
- Release: August 26, 1982

Massarati and the Brain is a 1982 American television film produced by Aaron Spelling.

== Plot ==
A billionaire private detective is looking for missing treasure, with the help of his young geek nephew, his domestic and cook, and a federal agent.

== Cast ==
- Daniel Pilon as Mas Massarati
- Peter Billingsley as Christopher "The Brain" Massarati
- Christopher Hewett as Anatole
- Markie Post as Julie Ramsdell
- Ann Turkel as Wilma Hines
- Camilla Sparv as Dorothea
- Kathryn Witt as Diana Meridith
- Christopher Lee as Victor Leopold
- Kaz Garas as Nick Henry
- Gail Jensen as Camille Henry
- Heather O'Rourke as Skye Henry
- Ricky Supiran as Rocky Henry
