= Death Valley (1982 film) =

1982 film by Dick Richards

- Theatrical release poster by Richard Hescox
- Directed by: Dick Richards
- Written by: Richard Rothstein
- Produced by: Elliott Kastner
- Starring: Paul Le Mat; Catherine Hicks; Stephen McHattie; Wilford Brimley; Peter Billingsley; Edward Herrmann
- Cinematography: Stephen H. Burum
- Edited by: Joel Cox
- Music by: Dana Kaproff
- Production companies: Universal Pictures; The Producer—Director Co.
- Distributed by: Universal Pictures
- Release date: January 22, 1982
- Running time: 88 minutes
- Country: United States
- Language: English

Death Valley is a 1982 American slasher film directed by Dick Richards, written by Richard Rothstein, and starring Paul Le Mat, Catherine Hicks, Stephen McHattie, Wilford Brimley, Peter Billingsley, and Edward Herrmann. Its plot focuses on a young boy who accompanies his mother and her new boyfriend on a road trip through the Death Valley National Park, where they are unwittingly targeted by a serial killer.

== Plot ==
Paul Stanton, a Princeton University professor, has separated from his wife Sally, who has rekindled a romance with her high school sweetheart, Mike. The couple's son, Billy, reluctantly accompanies Sally on a trip from New York City back to her hometown of Phoenix, Arizona, to meet Mike and embark on a road trip to California. Tensions abound between Mike and the precocious Billy, despite Sally's attempts to forge a connection between the two.

As the group embark on a barren stretch of road in Death Valley, Billy notices a weathered gold Cadillac Series 62 pass them by. While visiting an abandoned mining site further down the highway, Billy unknowingly stumbles upon an RV where three young people have just been murdered. Billy fails to notice the Cadillac parked nearby, and absconds with a unique gold frog pendant he finds in the RV.

After checking into a hotel, Mike, Sally, and Billy visit a diner where a waiter named Hal notices Billy clutching the frog pendant; Billy likewise recognizes a similar pendant on Hal's neck. After leaving, the group observe police recovering the now-wrecked RV that Billy discovered at the mining site. Mike informs the Sheriff where they saw the RV earlier that day, and Billy turns the pendant in to him. The Sheriff—who has long been suspicious of Hal and his brother, Stu, as potential suspects in several local killings—visits Hal at his home to question him. Hal identifies the frog pendant as belonging to Stu. As the Sheriff attempts to follow Hal outside, Stu appears and murders him with a pickaxe. Meanwhile, Mike and Sally bring Billy to an Old West frontier tourist town. Hal tracks them there and attempts to shoot Billy to silence him, but is mistaken as a cowboy impersonator by tourists, thwarting his murder attempt.

Later that night, Mike and Sally go out for drinks, leaving Billy at the hotel with a babysitter. Hal arrives at the hotel and slashes the babysitter's throat before infiltrating the room, but Billy manages to escape to the hotel's exterior grounds. Billy attempts to hide in the back of a car, but the plan backfires when he realizes he is in Hal's Cadillac, which Hal departs in with him in tow. Meanwhile, Mike and Sally overhear locals at the bar discussing Hal and Stu's potential culpability in the murders. The two swiftly return to the hotel to find Billy missing, and notify the hotel manager to phone the police while they take directions to Hal's residence.

Mike and Sally arrive at Hal's home shortly before Hal does. While Hal exits the car, Billy spots Mike and Sally's station wagon and sneaks into the house to warn them. Hal begins to fire a shotgun into the house, narrowly missing Billy and Sally. In a cabinet, the three discover the Sheriff's corpse before a shootout ensues, ending with Mike fatally wounding Hal. The three travel on foot and break into an historic mission, where they manage to phone the police. The Cadillac appears outside the mission, now driven by Stu, who is revealed to be Hal's twin. Armed with a knife, Stu attacks the three, but Billy manages to use Mike's pistol to shoot him. Stu flees outside after Billy, but Mike and Sally use the Cadillac to strike him, causing him to land on a sharp agave plant, which fatally impales him. With the ordeal finally over, the family embraces.

== Cast ==
- Paul Le Mat as Mike
- Catherine Hicks as Sally
- Stephen McHattie as Hal
- A. Wilford Brimley as Sheriff
- Peter Billingsley as Billy
- Edward Herrmann as Paul Stanton
- Jack O'Leary as Earl
- Mary Steelsmith as Baby Sitter
- Gina Christian as R.V. Girl
- Kirk Koskella as R.V. Boy (as Kirk I. Kiskella)
- Frank J. Cimorelli as R.V. Boy
- Arnold C. Waterman as On Looker
- Fred W.S. Newton as Outlaw
- J.P.S. Brown as Western Sheriff
- Roy Gunsberg as Tour Guide (as Roy S. Gunsburg)
- Merritt Holloway as Motel Clerk
- Glenn McCreedy as Stu
- Earl W. Smith as Crony
- Allan Wood as Crony

== Production ==
Filming partially took place at the historic Scotty's Castle in the Death Valley National Park.

Principal photography took place between November and December 1980 in Phoenix and Wickenburg, Arizona. The hotel resort where the characters in the film stay is Scotty's Castle, located in the Death Valley National Park.

== Release ==
Death Valley was theatrically released on January 22, 1982, in Los Angeles and other the western U.S. cities, It later opened on the east coast in New York City on May 7, 1982.

=== Home media ===
On December 11, 2012, Shout! Factory released a retail Blu-ray/DVD combo pack of the film.

== Reception ==
=== Critical response ===
Joseph Bensoua of the Daily Breeze panned the film, describing it as "an empty-headed, sometimes gory psycho-thriller that'll have you snoring in your seat." A review published by the Statesman Journal was similarly dismissive, classifying the film as "pure trash" and a "waste of a promising cast."

== Sources ==
- Armstrong, Richard B. (2008). The Rough Guide to Film. London, England: Rough Guides. ISBN 978-1-848-36125-6.
- Armstrong, Richard B.; Armstrong, Mary Willems (2015). Encyclopedia of Film Themes, Settings and Series. Jefferson, North Carolina: McFarland. ISBN 978-1-476-61230-0.
- Palazzo, Robert P. (2017). Scotty's Castle. Images of America. Charleston, South Carolina: Arcadia Publishing. ISBN 978-1-467-11675-6.
