= Daffynition =

Form of humour

A daffynition (a portmanteau blend of daffy and definition) is a form of pun involving the reinterpretation of an existing word, on the basis that it sounds like another word (or group of words). Presented in the form of dictionary definitions, they are similar to transpositional puns, but often much less complex and easier to create.

Under the name Uxbridge English Dictionary, making up daffynitions is a popular game on the BBC Radio 4 comedy quiz show I'm Sorry I Haven't a Clue.

A lesser-known subclass of daffynition is the goofinition, which relies strictly on literal associations and correct spellings, such as "lobster = a weak tennis player". This play on words is similar to Cockney rhyming slang.

== Examples ==
- acrostic: An angry bloodsucking arachnid. (a-cross-tick)
- American: A happy cylindrical food container. (a-merry-can)
- apéritif: A set of dentures. (a-pair-of-teeth)
- avoidable: What a bullfighter tries to do. (avoid-a-bull)
- buccaneer: too much to pay for corn ([a]-buck-an-ear)
- dandelion: A fashionably dressed big cat (dandy-lion)
- decadent: Possessing only ten teeth. (deca-dent)
- denial: A river in Egypt. (the-Nile)
- devastation: Where people wait for buses. (the-bus-station)
- dilate: live long (die-late)
- euthanasia: Teenagers in the world's largest continent. (youth-in-Asia)
- fortunate: Consumption of an expensive meal. (fortune-ate)
- impolite: A flaming goblin. (imp-alight)
- indistinct: where one places dirty dishes (in-the-sink)
- information: how geese fly (in-formation)
- innuendoes: Italian suppositories. (in-you-end-os)
- insolent: Fallen off the Isle of Wight ferry. (in-Solent)
- isolate: Me not on time. (I-(am)-so-late)
- laburnum: French for barbecue. (la-burn-em)
- legend: A foot. (leg-end)
- mendicant: A gynaecologist.
- oboe: A French tramp. (hobo)
- paradox: Two doctors. (pair-of-docs) or where one ties two boats. (Pair of docks)
- pasteurise: Too far to see. (past-your-eyes)
- protein: In favour of youth. (pro-teen)
- propaganda: A gentlemanly goose. (proper-gander) or to look at something very carefully (proper-gander, where gander is slang for looking)
- recycle: To repair a bicycle, or obtain a replacement bicycle. (re-cycle)
- relief: What trees do in Spring. (re-leaf)
- specimen: An Italian astronaut. (spaceman)
- symmetry: A South African or New Zealand graveyard. (cemetery)

== See also ==
- Eggcorn
- Rebracketing
- Sniglet
- The Meaning of Liff
- The Devil's Dictionary
