= Term Life =

2016 film by Peter Billingsley

- Theatrical release poster
- Directed by: Peter Billingsley
- Screenplay by: A. J. Lieberman
- Based on: Term Life by: A. J. Lieberman; Nick Thornborrow
- Produced by: Kevin Scott Frakes; Micah Mason; Victoria Vaughn; Vince Vaughn; Michael J. Luisi
- Starring: Vince Vaughn; Hailee Steinfeld; Bill Paxton; Jonathan Banks; Mike Epps; Jordi Mollà; Shea Whigham; William Levy; Taraji P. Henson; Annabeth Gish; Terrence Howard
- Cinematography: Roberto Schaefer
- Edited by: Dan Lebental; Kevin Stermer
- Music by: Dave Porter
- Production companies: PalmStar Entertainment; WWE Studios; Wild West Picture Show Productions
- Distributed by: Focus World
- Release date: April 29, 2016 (United States)
- Running time: 93 minutes
- Country: United States
- Language: English
- Box office: $89,546

Term Life is a 2016 American crime drama film directed by Peter Billingsley from a screenplay by A.J. Lieberman, based on the graphic novel of the same name by Lieberman and Nick Thornborrow. The film stars Vince Vaughn, who also produces the film, Hailee Steinfeld, Bill Paxton, Jonathan Banks, Mike Epps, Jordi Molla, Shea Whigham, William Levy, Taraji P. Henson, Annabeth Gish, and Terrence Howard.

Term Life was released in the United States by Focus World on April 29, 2016, via a limited release and through video on demand. The film received negative reviews from critics.

== Plot ==
Nick Barrow plans and sells heists to the highest bidder but is forced to take his daughter Cate, who he hasn't had a relationship with her whole life, on the lam when a job goes bad. Cate has had to fend for herself because her mother Lucy is an alcoholic, giving her father a hard time because his criminal activity which has now disrupted her life. Nick is trying to connect the dots and hunt down who double-crossed him. With the aid of an elderly man Harper, he gets the inside scoop and comes to the conclusion that it was an undercover officer Captain Keenan who is out to kill Nick.

In the meantime, Nick and Cate bond and she asks how he does his heists: "learn how to get out before you get in, evaluate the security of a location, whether they have CCTV or the owner is the one that responds, and always make sure to have a workable exit plan." Cate was initially irritated that her father knows so much about her and has taken pictures of her throughout her life and has kept it in a box but she also enjoys the birthday gift he gets for her, taking her to the carnival and teaching her how to shoot. Keenan now needs to clean up his corrupt team who is ratting him out to Internal Affairs and kills Detective Matty and a hooker and fingers Nick as the guy who did the killing.

Hunted by mob bosses, contract killers and dirty cops, he takes out a life insurance policy on himself to leave something for her. Nick educates Cate on how to separate and survive. In the meantime, Nick gets arrested by the local sheriff responding to an APB and the Spanish mob springs him out of jail to kill him but Cate comes to the rescue. Cate and Nick argue and Cate abandons Nick on the side of the road. Keenan abducts Cate and uses her as bait to try to get Nick and in the shoot-out, Nick and Cate escape. Even though Nick was unwilling to listen to Cate's plan, Cate executed a plan that got rid of Keenan, evidence pointed to him for multiple murders and exonerated Nick, and Nick and Cate choose to live together and bond as father and daughter.

== Cast ==
- Vince Vaughn as Nick Barrow
- Hailee Steinfeld as Cate Barrow
  - Julia Butters as 7 Years Old Cate
  - Ava Acres as 12 Years Old Cate
- Bill Paxton as Detective Joe Keenan
- Jonathan Banks as Harper
- Mike Epps as Detective Darryl Mosley
- Jordi Mollà as Victor Vasquez
- Shea Whigham as Detective Matty Miller
- Jon Favreau as Jimmy Lincoln
- William Levy as Alejandro Vasquez
- Taraji P. Henson as Samantha Thurman
- Annabeth Gish as Lucy Barrow
- Terrence Howard as Sheriff Braydon
- Rio Hackford as Deputy Dean
- Cain Velasquez as Marco
- Manuel Garcia-Rulfo as Pedro
- Javier Carrasquillo as Jaime
- Fernando Martinez as "Dead Eye"
- Jose Miguel Vasquez as Detective Oscar
- Brent Briscoe as Officer Murphy
- Kate Forbes as Karen Miller
- Travis Johns as Andy
- James Paxton as Adam
- Griffin Freeman as Brandon
- Ian Gregg as Jeremy
- Terri Abney as Sasha
- Danna Maret as Becca
- Matthew Willig as Thug #1
- Tait Fletcher as Thug #2
- Morganna Bridgers as Hooker
- Tracye Hutchins as herself
- Rebekka Schramm Moorer as herself
- Brian F. Durkin as Detective John Stasio
- Daniel Bernhardt as Detective Rick DiNardi (uncredited)
- Cecile De France as Lucy (uncredited)
- Bryan Basil as Hitman (uncredited)
- Carlos Aviles as Mexican Gangster (uncredited)
- Georgy Fontanals as Mexican Thug (uncredited)

== Production ==
Production came to an abrupt halt when Universal decided to cancel the film in October 2013, just a month after casting Hailee Steinfeld. The film was then revived a month later by QED International and PalmStar Entertainment, who co-financed and produced the film with Universal on board to handle U.S. distribution. Filming began on March 1, 2014, with a casting call issued in Grantville, Georgia, and concluded on April 22, 2014.

== Release ==
Originally Universal Pictures was set to distribute the film. However, Focus World ended up getting distribution rights to the film. The film was originally scheduled to be released on March 1, 2016, through video on demand, prior to opening in a limited release on April 8, 2016. However, it was delayed to April 29, 2016, with the film opening in a limited release and through video on demand.

== Reception ==
The film received a score of 0% on Rotten Tomatoes based on 7 reviews.

Noel Murray of the Los Angeles Times wrote: "Term Life is cleanly plotted and tautly paced, but it's never as fun as it should be."
