= Transpositional pun =

Form of joke

A transpositional pun is a pun format with two aspects. It involves transposing the words in a well-known phrase or saying to get a daffynition-like clever redefinition of a well-known word unrelated to the original phrase. The redefinition is thus the first aspect, and the transposition the second aspect. As a result, transpositional puns are considered among the most difficult to create, and commonly the most challenging to comprehend, particularly for non-native speakers of the language in which they're given (most commonly English).

== Examples ==
Transpositional pun	Original reference	Ref.
Dieting: A waist is a terrible thing to mind.	"A mind is a terrible thing to waste", the motto of the United Negro College Fund.	
Hangovers: The wrath of grapes.	The Grapes of Wrath	
Sports officials: The souls that time men's tries.	"These are the times that try men's souls.", Thomas Paine	
The oboe: An ill wind that nobody blows any good.	"'Tis an ill wind that blows nobody any good."	
Feudalism: It's your count that votes!	"It's your vote that counts!"	
Soldiers of fortune: Give chance a piece.	"Give peace a chance".	

== See also ==
- Antimetabole
- Anti-proverb
- Chiasmus
- Russian reversal
- Spoonerism
