= Sniglet =

Term for a made-up word

A sniglet (/ˈsnɪɡlɪt/) is an often humorous word made up to describe something for which no dictionary word exists. Introduced in the 1980s TV comedy series Not Necessarily the News, sniglets were generated and published in significant numbers, along with submissions by fans, in several books by Rich Hall, beginning with his Sniglets, Sniglets for Kids, and More Sniglets in the mid-1980s.

== Origin ==
=== Development by Rich Hall ===
The term sniglet was conceived by comedian Rich Hall during his tenure on the 1980s HBO comedy series Not Necessarily the News. Each monthly episode featured a regular segment on sniglets, which Hall described as "any word that doesn't appear in the dictionary, but should". In 1984, a collection of sniglets was published by Hall, titled Sniglets (snig' lit: any word that doesn't appear in the dictionary, but should). This was followed by a "daily comic panel" in newspapers, four more books, a game, and a calendar. Many sniglets are portmanteau words, a comic style often traced to Lewis Carroll.

The Hall books have their entries arranged in alphabetical order, like a dictionary, with information on how to pronounce the word, a definition, and sometimes an illustration. The original book has two appendices, "Anatomical Sniglets" and "Extra Added Bonus Section for Poets", and More Sniglets includes an "Audio-Visual Sniglets" section. All five books included an "Official Sniglets Entry Blank", beginning, "Dear Rich: Here's my sniglet, which is every bit as clever as any in this dictionary."

The Game of Sniglets is a board game in which players try to identify the official sniglet from a list that also includes sniglets created by fellow participants to go along with a provided definition. Players earn points by either guessing which word is the official sniglet or by having their word chosen as the best candidate; the points earned determine how many spaces players can advance on the game board. The game instructions offer suggestions for creating a new sniglet, such as combining or blending words; changing the spelling of a word related to the definition; or creating new, purely nonsensical words.

=== Precursors ===
In 1914, humorist Gelett Burgess published a dictionary of original neologisms, Burgess Unabridged: A New Dictionary of Words You Have Always Needed. Humor writer Paul Jennings had published made-up meanings of real place-names in a 1963 essay appearing in The Jenguin Pennings. Author Douglas Adams, while travelling with British comedy producer John Lloyd, suggested they play a game he had learned at school in which players were challenged to make up plausible word definitions for place names taken from road maps; the definitions they came up with were later incorporated into a 1983 book, The Meaning of Liff. The similarities and relationship between the content of this book and the Hall concept of sniglets is noted, by Barbara Wallraff, in Word Court (2001). Douglas Adams believed that when the format of Lloyd's satirical TV show Not the Nine O'Clock News was sold to America—where it became Not Necessarily the News—the producers also took the made-up word definition concept, which became the sniglets popularized by Hall.

== Beyond comedy ==
In a 1990 interview, Hall was asked if the "Sniglets books [were] completely for comic value?" He answered,

Yeah. Well, no. I wouldn't say they're completely for comic value. I mean, I get letters from schools all the time saying how they've incorporated a sniglet book into their reading program. You can look at a lot of the words and sort of break them down into their etymological origins. And you can learn a lot about how and where words derive from. When you assign this frailty of human nature a word, then the word has to work. It has to either be a hybrid of several other words, or have a Latin origin, or something.

Anne Wescott Dodd's A Handbook for Substitute Teachers (1989) and Marcia L. Tate's Reading and Language Arts Worksheets Don't Grow Dendrites: 20 Literacy Strategies That Engage the Brain (2005) suggest creating sniglets as a classroom activity, and so bear out his claim.

Popular English language experts such as Richard Lederer and Barbara Wallraff have noted sniglets in their books, The Miracle of Language and Word Court: Wherein Verbal Virtue Is Rewarded, Crimes Against the Language Are Punished, and Poetic Justice Is Done, respectively. Barbara Wallraff has borrowed the idea for her book Word Fugitives: In Pursuit of Wanted Words, where "word fugitives" is her term for invented words. Wallraff's Atlantic Monthly column "Word Fugitives" features words invented by readers, although they had to be puns, which many sniglets are not.

== Examples ==
- Aquadextrous: possessing the ability to turn the bathtub faucet with the toes.
- Castcaspers: dead actors who appear on television.
- Chwads: discarded gum found beneath tables and countertops.
- Essoasso: One who swerves through a service station to avoid a red light.
- Glutetic chair: the chair design found in movie theaters.
- Icelanche: When ice at the bottom of an upturned glass suddenly moves toward the mouth as one attempts to finish drinking the liquid.
- Jokesult: When someone insults you, you call them on it, and they say, "It was just a joke."
- Larry: a frayed toothbrush.
- Premblememblemation: The act of checking that a letter is in a mailbox after it has been dropped.
- Snackmosphere: the pocket of air found inside snack and/or potato chip bags.
- Terma helper: The extra verbiage used to stretch a 600-word essay to the required 1000.
- Toboggan hagen: a large ice cream sundae.
- Eyes-Hockey: The substance found in the corner of one's eye in the morning.
- Pursabyss: where unrecovered belongings reside within a woman's handbag.

== In popular culture ==
Homer Simpson, a fictional character of the animated television series The Simpsons, suggests Son of Sniglet as a good book to name as a favorite and a life influence when he is completing his college application in the episode "Homer Goes to College".

The fictional character Dale Gribble in the animated television series King of the Hill explains his inappropriate laughter upon successfully sabotaging a new relationship of fellow character Bill Dauterive, saying "just remembered a funny sniglet!"

The satirical newspaper The Onion published an article in 2001 mocking sniglets as an obscure fad.

== See also ==
- Daffynition
- Dord
- Eggcorn
- Jabberwocky
- Mondegreen
- Phono-semantic matching
