= The Meaning of Liff =

1983 humorous dictionary by Douglas Adams and John Lloyd

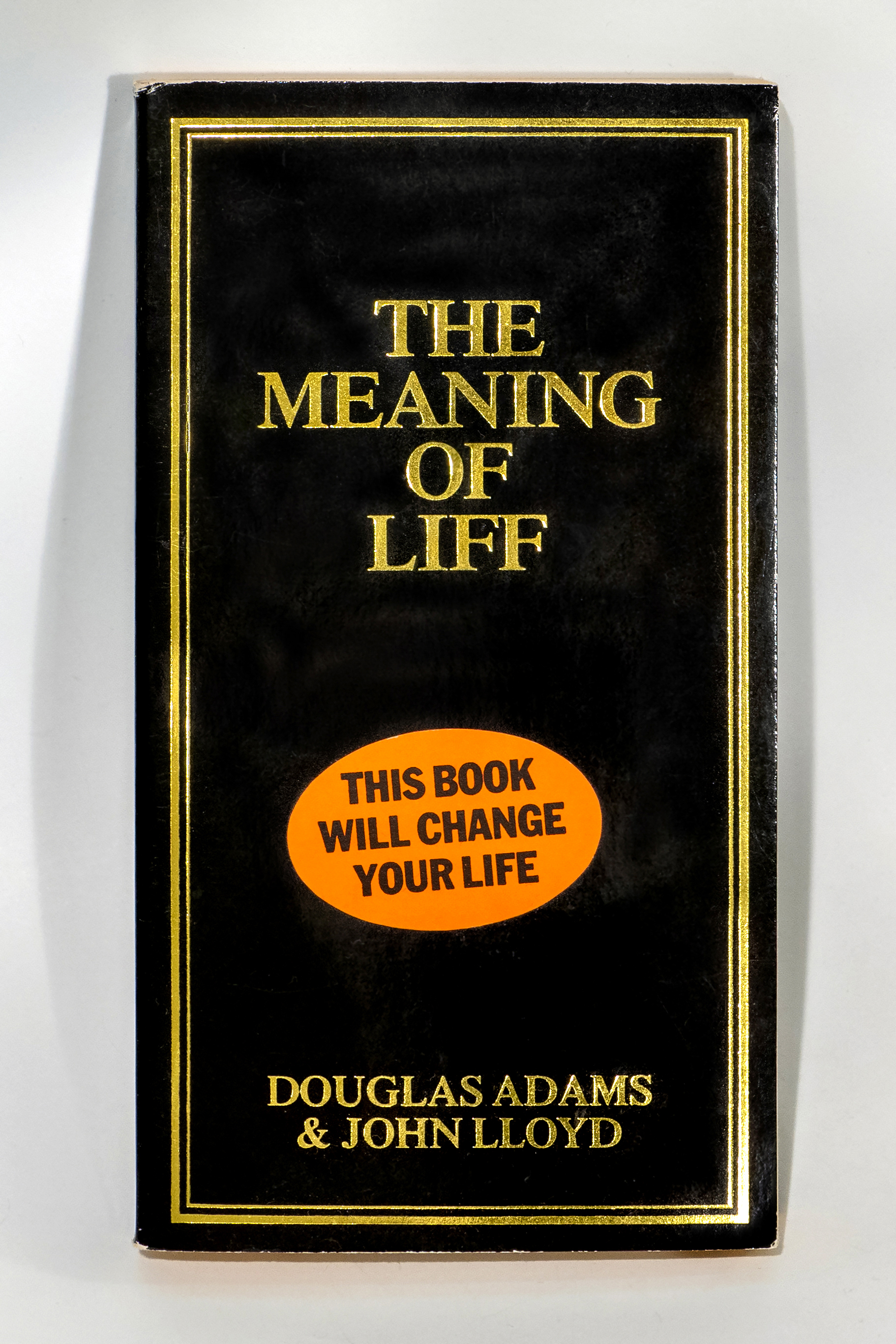
- The original 1983 UK cover of the book, with sticker.
- Author: Douglas Adams; John Lloyd
- Language: English
- Subject: Humour/Toponymy/Etymology
- Publisher: Pan Books
- Publication date: 11 November 1983
- Publication place: United Kingdom
- Media type: Paperback
- Pages: 191
- ISBN: 0-330-28121-6 (UK Edition); 0-517-55347-3 (US Edition)
- Followed by: The Deeper Meaning of Liff

1984 US edition

1990 US edition

The Meaning of Liff is a humorous dictionary of toponymy and etymology, written by Douglas Adams and John Lloyd, published in the United Kingdom in 1983 (ISBN 0-330-28121-6) and the United States in 1984 (ISBN 0-517-55347-3).

== Content ==
The book is a "dictionary of things that there aren't any words for yet". Rather than inventing new words, Adams and Lloyd picked a number of existing place-names and assigned interesting meanings to them, meanings that can be regarded as on the verge of social existence and ready to become recognisable entities.

All the words listed are toponyms and describe common feelings and objects for which there is no current English word. Examples are Shoeburyness ("The vague uncomfortable feeling you get when sitting on a seat that is still warm from somebody else's bottom") and Plymouth ("To relate an amusing story to someone without remembering that it was they who told it to you in the first place").

The book cover usually features the tagline "This book will change your life", either as part of its cover or as an adhesive label. Liff (a village near Dundee in Scotland) is then defined in the book as "A book, the contents of which are totally belied by its cover. For instance, any book the dust jacket of which bears the words, 'This book will change your life'."

== Origin and publication ==
According to Adams's account, the idea behind The Meaning of Liff grew out of an old school game and started when he and Lloyd were on holiday together in Corfu in 1978 during the writing of the first Hitchhiker's novel. This idea was used as part of the Not the Nine O'Clock News spin-off book Not 1982 (ISBN 0-571-11853-4), where they were headed "Today's new word from the Oxtail English Dictionary". The suggestion of turning this into a complete book in itself came from Faber MD Matthew Evans. The bulk of the text was written by Adams and Lloyd in Summer 1982 in Malibu, California.

Essentially the same idea was used by the English humourist Paul Jennings in an article Ware, Wye, Watford, published in the late 1950s. Adams speculated that the teacher who originated the school game may have done so after reading the article. He sent a note of apology to Jennings. Fellow humourist Miles Kington defended Adams and Lloyd in his column in The Times, noting a difference in style.

The book was released in the UK in November 1983 in time for the Christmas market. It was a commercial success for Pan Books.

The title of the book was chosen to be very similar to Monty Python's film The Meaning of Life that was being produced at the same time, after Douglas Adams called Terry Jones to ask if it would be OK. Adams's idea was that the potential confusion with the film's script would help to sell more copies of the book. In fact, in the beginning of the Monty Python film, the gravestone with the title "The Meaning of Liff" appears before a lightning bolt strikes the last F and converts it to an E.

== Versions ==
A revised and expanded edition of The Meaning of Liff, with about twice as many definitions, was published in 1990 as The Deeper Meaning of Liff (UK Edition: ISBN 0-330-31606-0, US Edition: ISBN 0-517-58597-9), though the original remains in print. Some of the new words in Deeper had previously appeared in a Liff piece by Adams, Lloyd and Stephen Fry in The Utterly Utterly Merry Comic Relief Christmas Book (1986). The main differences between the two editions (for either version of the book) are those of American English v. British English spellings, though The Deeper Meaning of Liff contains different definitions for both the word "Glossop" and the titular word "Liff". In The Deeper Meaning of Liff, Liff is defined as a phenomenon for which there is no word.

Another edition in the series, Afterliff, has been released, with more entries contributed by Lloyd, Jon Canter and Douglas Adams's daughter Polly.

On 15 August 2013, a 30th anniversary deluxe edition was published.

A German adaptation was made by Sven Böttcher under the title Der tiefere Sinn des Labenz, published in 1992 (ISBN 3-453-87960-0). The meanings are translated from the original but are matched to place names that convey the humorous effect in German. The most recent edition includes both the German adaptation and the English original (ISBN 3-453-87960-0).

In 1989, a Dutch version was published under the title Kunt U Breukelen? by Justus van Oel (Nijgh & van Ditmar, ISBN 90 236 7311 5), utilising the same book size format as the standard UK version, 9.1 cm × 16.8 cm (3 1/2 in × 6 1/2 in). The book used place names mainly from the Netherlands, as well as a handful from neighbouring Belgium and Luxembourg. There was no hardback edition, and neither was The Deeper Meaning of Liff adapted for the Dutch market. It was reissued in 2000 with a different cover.

The Finnish adaptations "Elimäen tarkoitus" and "Elimäen perimmäinen tarkoitus" were published in 1996 and 1997 (ISBN 952-9646-26-7 and ISBN 952-9646-52-6).

Comedian Anders Lund Madsen wrote a Danish version with the title Madsens ÆØÅ - Dictionary of things for which there are as yet, funnily enough, no words, published 1997. It is not a translation; instead it is stated as an "Idea stolen from Douglas Adams & John Lloyd" and The Meaning of Liff is mentioned in the publisher's copyright text.

== Reception ==
Dave Langford reviewed The Meaning of Liff for White Dwarf #49, and stated that "it's very funny. Liff evolved from a parlour game in which you decide what a placename should mean, as in Paul Jennings's 1964 essay which explained that Bodmin was a unit of work equal to one-sixtieth of a man-hour."

== Reviews ==
- Review by Jo Duffy (1985) in Epic Illustrated, June 1985
- Review by Don D'Ammassa (1994) in Science Fiction Chronicle, #172 April & May 1994

== See also ==
- Daffynition
- List of generic forms in British place names
- Phono-semantic matching
- Sniglet
- The Computer Contradictionary
- The Devil's Dictionary
- Uxbridge English Dictionary
