= Tokyo Hachioji Bee Trains =

- Division: Third
- Leagues: B.League
- Founded: 2012
- History: Tokyo Hachioji Trains (2012–2018); Tokyo Hachioji Bee Trains (2018–present)
- Arena: Ésforta Arena Hachiōji
- Capacity: 2,000
- Location: Hachiōji, Tokyo
- Head coach: Marko Filipovic
- Website: Official website
Home	Away

The Tokyo Hachioji Bee Trains (東京八王子ビートレインズ) are a Japanese professional basketball team based in Hachiōji, Tokyo. The team most recently competed in the third division of the B.League. Starting from the 2026–27 season, the team will compete in the B.League One, the league's second division, as a member of the Eastern Conference.

== Coaches ==
- François Peronnet
- Tyler Gatlin
- Takatoshi Ishibashi
- Miodrag Rajković
- Marko Filipovic
- Keisuke Hirose

== Roster ==
Tokyo Hachioji Bee Trains roster
Players
Coaches

Pos.	No.	Nat.	Name
PG	1	(Japan)	Fuki Yamamoto
PG	3	(Japan)	Keitaro Takaoka
F	5	(United States)	Taren Sullivan
G/F	7	(United States)	Donovan Clay
PF	8	(New Zealand)	Jonathan Janssen
F	10	(Japan)	Kohei Takahashi
F/C	11	(United States)	Nate Laszewski
PG	14	(Japan)	Shuto Ito
PG	17	(Japan)	Yuto Tokashiki
G	34	(Japan)	Takaya Kudou
F/C	60	(Japan)	Steve Kubema
PG	66	(Japan)	Sho Taguchi
PG	77	(Japan)	Hiroya Ogane
PG	99	(Japan)	Yusaku Oshiro

Head coach

Mitsuhiro Kamezaki

Assistant coach(es)

Sakutaro Kobayashi

Legend

- (C) Team captain
- Injured

- Roster
Updated: 17 October 2025

== Notable players ==
Former logo

- Cleanthony Early
- Carl Hall
- Alex Jones
- Edward Morris
- Shaquille Morris
- Le'Bryan Nash
- Jordan Richard
- Jordan Bowling
- Marcellus Sommerville
- Kenta Tateyama
- Niyokwizera Yves (fr)
- Taren Sullivan

== Arenas ==
- Ésforta Arena Hachiōji
- Nihon Kogakuin Arena
- Kofu General Citizens Hall
- Fuji Hokuroku Park Gymnasium
- Kaneyama Sports Center

== U15 ==
Bee Trains has a U-15 youth team.
