= Arcadia High School (Arizona) =

Location
- 4703 E. Indian School Road; Phoenix, Maricopa, Arizona 85018; United States; 33°29′34″N 111°58′54″W

Information
- Type: Public High school
- Established: 1958
- School district: Scottsdale Unified School District
- Principal: Janelle Danskey
- Teaching staff: 70.40 (FTE)
- Grades: 9–12
- Enrollment: 1,633 (2023-2024)
- Student to teacher ratio: 23.20
- Campus type: urban
- Colors: Scarlet and royal blue
- Athletics conference: 4A - Desert Sky
- Nickname: Titans
- Publication: The Titan Times
- Newspaper: The Arcadian
- Yearbook: The Olympian
- Website: School website
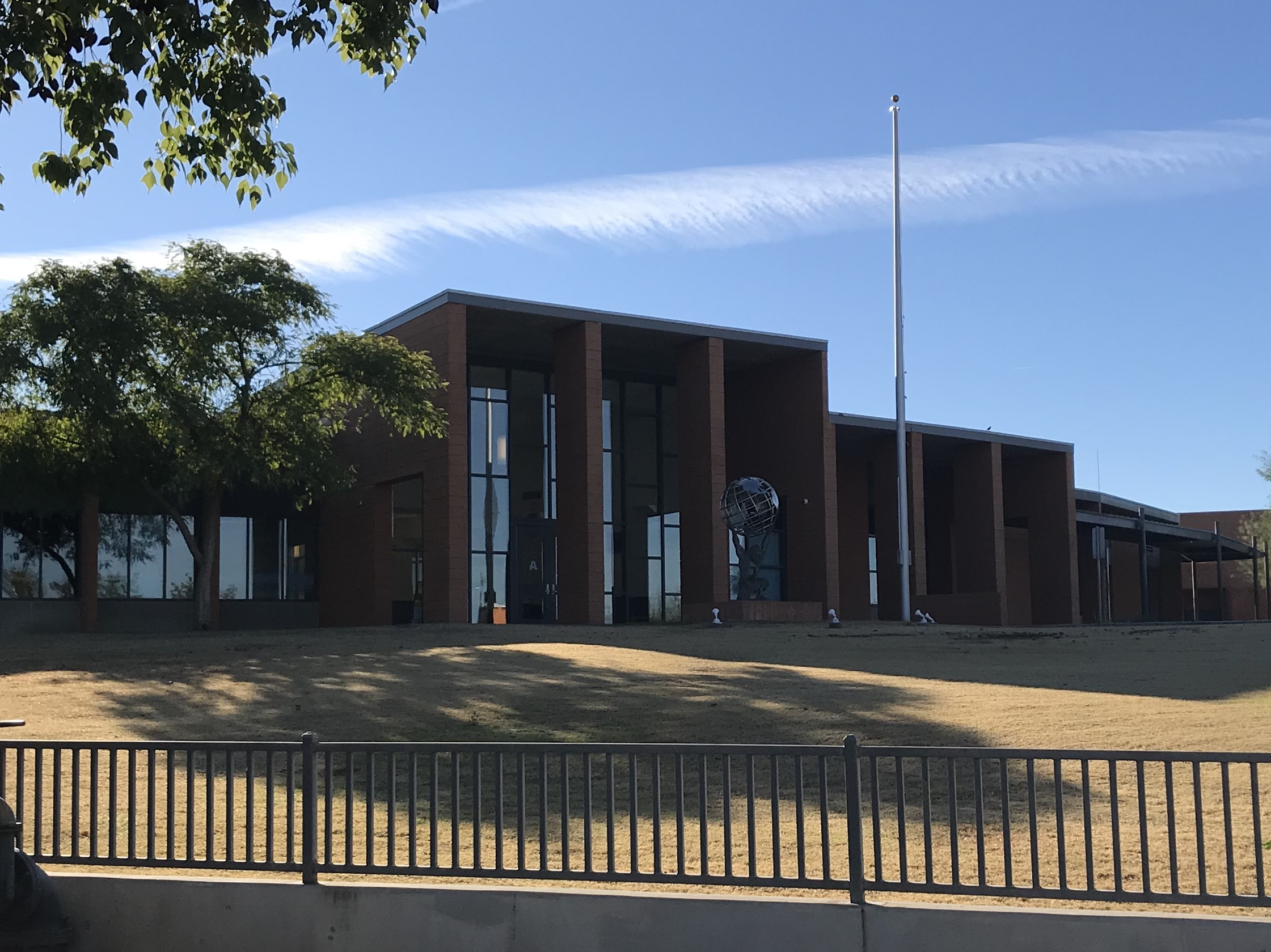
- Arcadia High School administration building viewed from Indian School Road, January 2020

Arcadia High School is a public high school in Phoenix. The school has 1,680 students enrolled. Most of them come from feeder schools in the Scottsdale Unified School District.

== History ==
The school was built 1958/59. It was designed by local architect Mel Ensign and built by Gilbert & Dolan Construction Co. The campus is known for its round buildings and futuristic space age design. Between 2005 and 2008 much of the original campus was demolished and a new campus was built in its place. The new campus was designed by Orcutt/Winslow Partnership and built by DL Withers Construction Co. The circular library is the only original building which remains.

== Extracurricular activities ==
=== Athletics ===
The school competes in interscholastic athletics in several sports. Arcadia was formerly 5A Northeast Valley and was moved to 4A Desert Sky by the conference alignment committee due to enrollment.

- Badminton
- Baseball
- Basketball (Boys)
- Basketball (Girls)
- Cross-Country
- Football
- Golf (Boys)
- Golf (Girls)
- Soccer (Boys)
- Soccer (Girls)
- Softball
- Swimming and Diving
- Tennis (Boys)
- Tennis (Girls)
- Track and Field
- Volleyball
- Spiritline
- Robotics
- Lacrosse

== Notable alumni ==
- Paul Cristo, composer
- Adam Driggs, former Arizona State Senator
- Lynda Carter, actress
- Calico Cooper, actress, singer, and dancer; daughter of Alice and Sheryl Cooper.
- Sam Huff, professional baseball catcher
- Alex Jones, basketball player
- Dianne Kay, actress
- Charles Keating IV, Navy SEAL sniper and Navy Cross recipient
- Kalyn Keller, Olympic swimmer
- Klete Keller, Olympic gold medalist swimmer and pardoned participant in the 2021 storming of the United States Capitol
- Haley Lu Richardson, actress
- Michele Mitchell (diver), two-time Olympic silver medalist
- Glenn Rockowitz, writer and voice actor
- William Shepherd, Engineer, Navy SEAL, Astronaut.
- Steven Spielberg, film and TV director, producer
- Allie Teilz musician, artist
- Gabe Suárez, professional baseball player and manager

== Notable staff ==
- Ken Rudolph, a former Major League catcher was the baseball coach until 2013.
- Kerry Taylor, a former American football player who began coaching at the school in 2018
