= Ésforta Arena Hachiōji =

Arena in Hachioji, Tokyo, Japan

Coordinates: 35°38′23.5″N 139°17′32.9″E

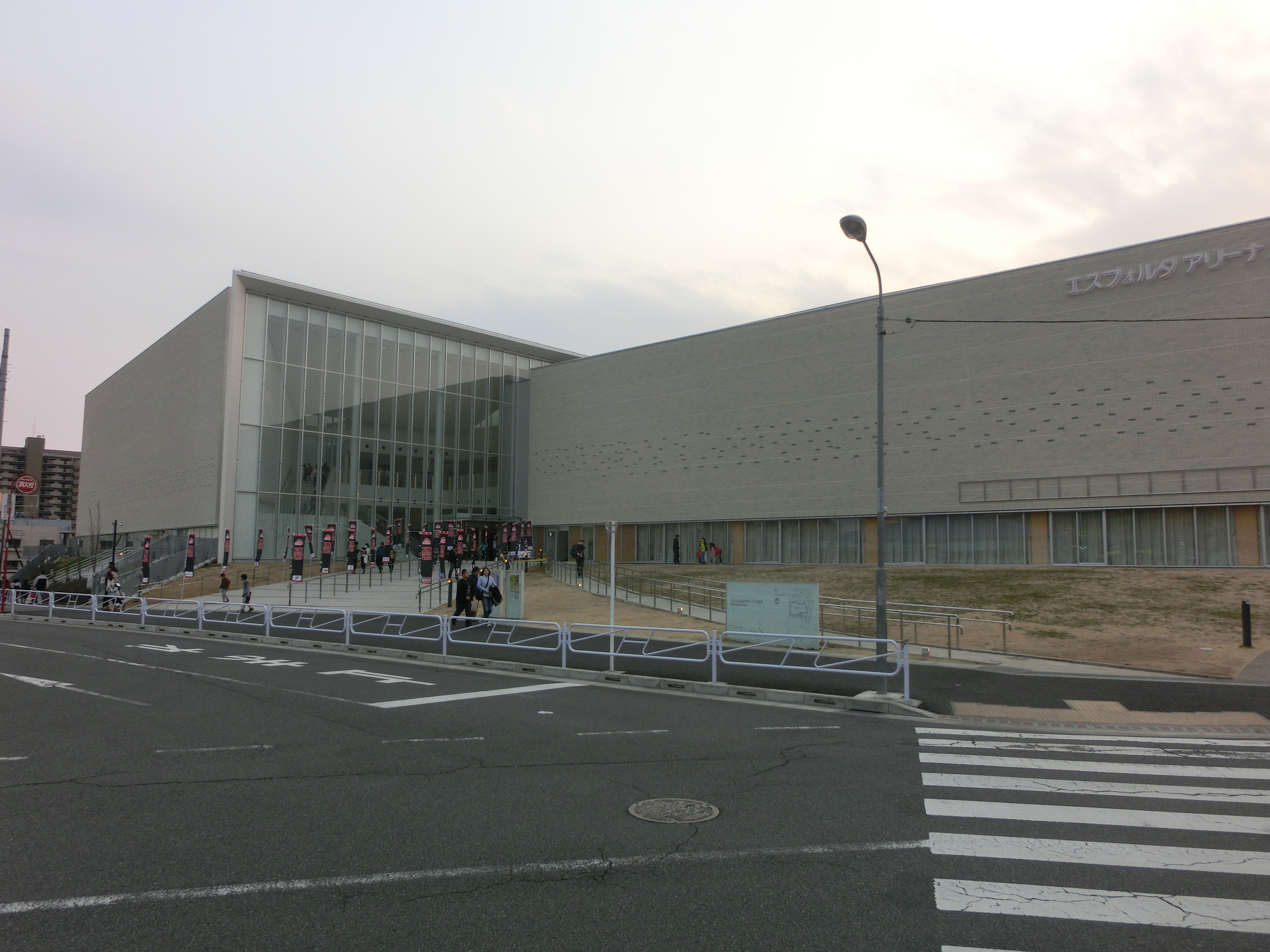
- Interactive map of Ésforta Arena Hachiōji
- Full name: Hachiōji City General Gymnasium
- Location: Hachiōji, Tokyo, Japan
- Owner: Hachioji city
- Operator: Hachioji Yumeori Support
- Capacity: 2,000

Construction
- Opened: 1 October 2014
- Cost

Tenant
- Tokyo Hachioji Bee Trains

Website
- http://hachioji.esforta.jp/english/

Ésforta Arena Hachiōji is an arena in Hachioji, Tokyo, Japan. It is the home arena of the Tokyo Hachioji Bee Trains of the B.League, Japan's professional basketball league. The arena can also host boxing and futsal matches.

== Gallery ==
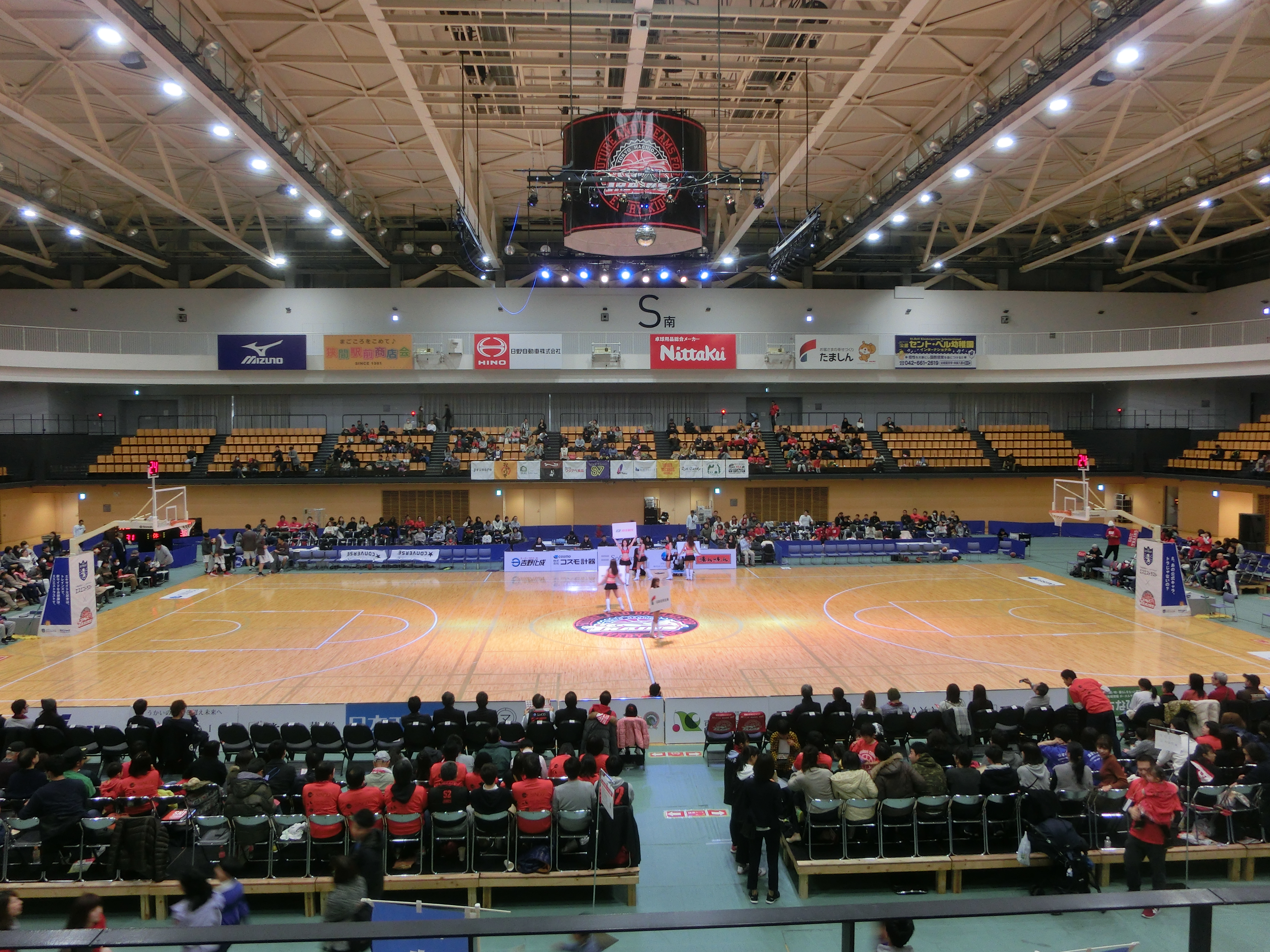
Main Arena

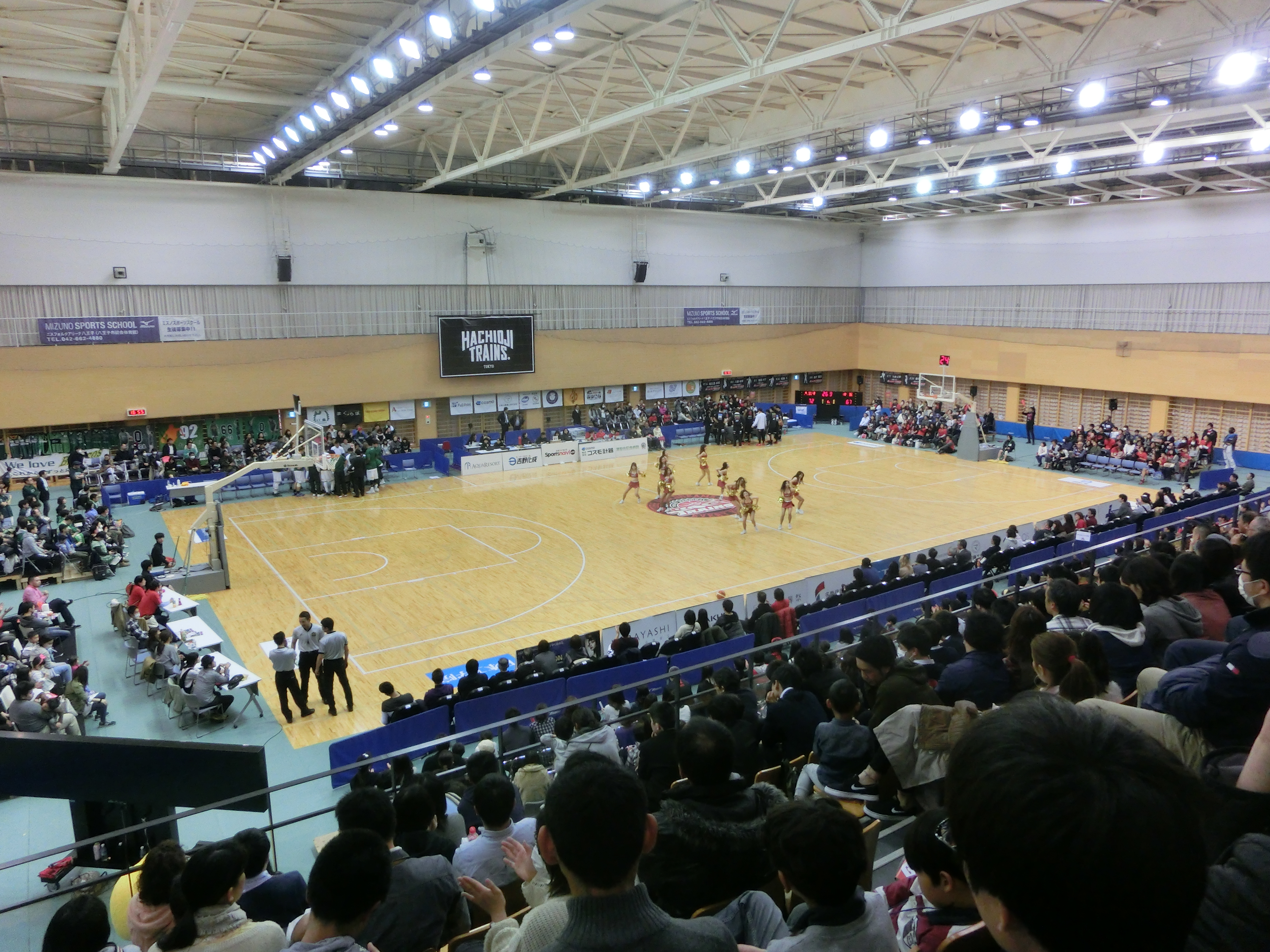
Sub Arena

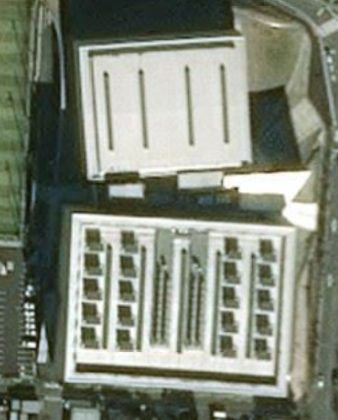
Satellite view

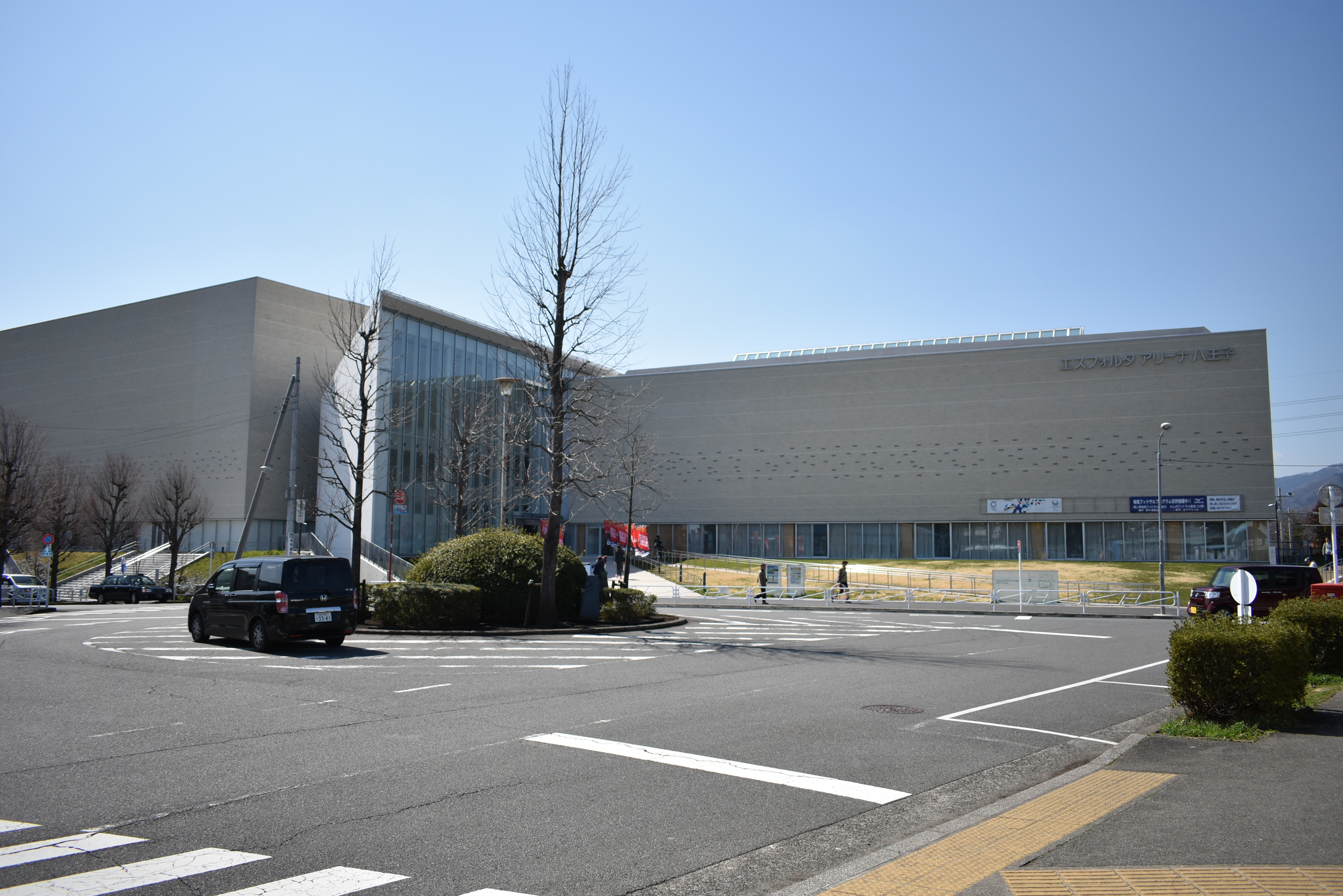

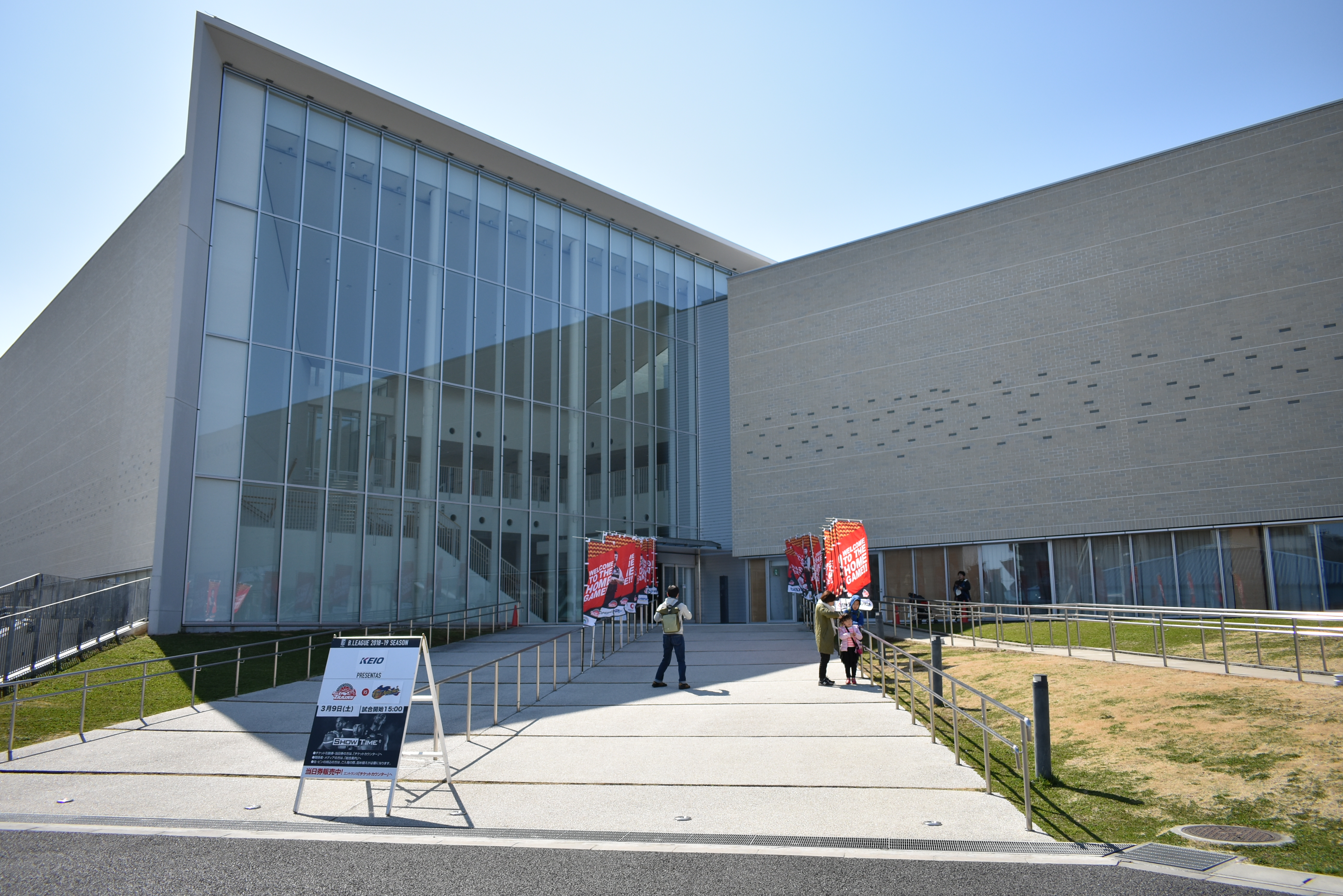

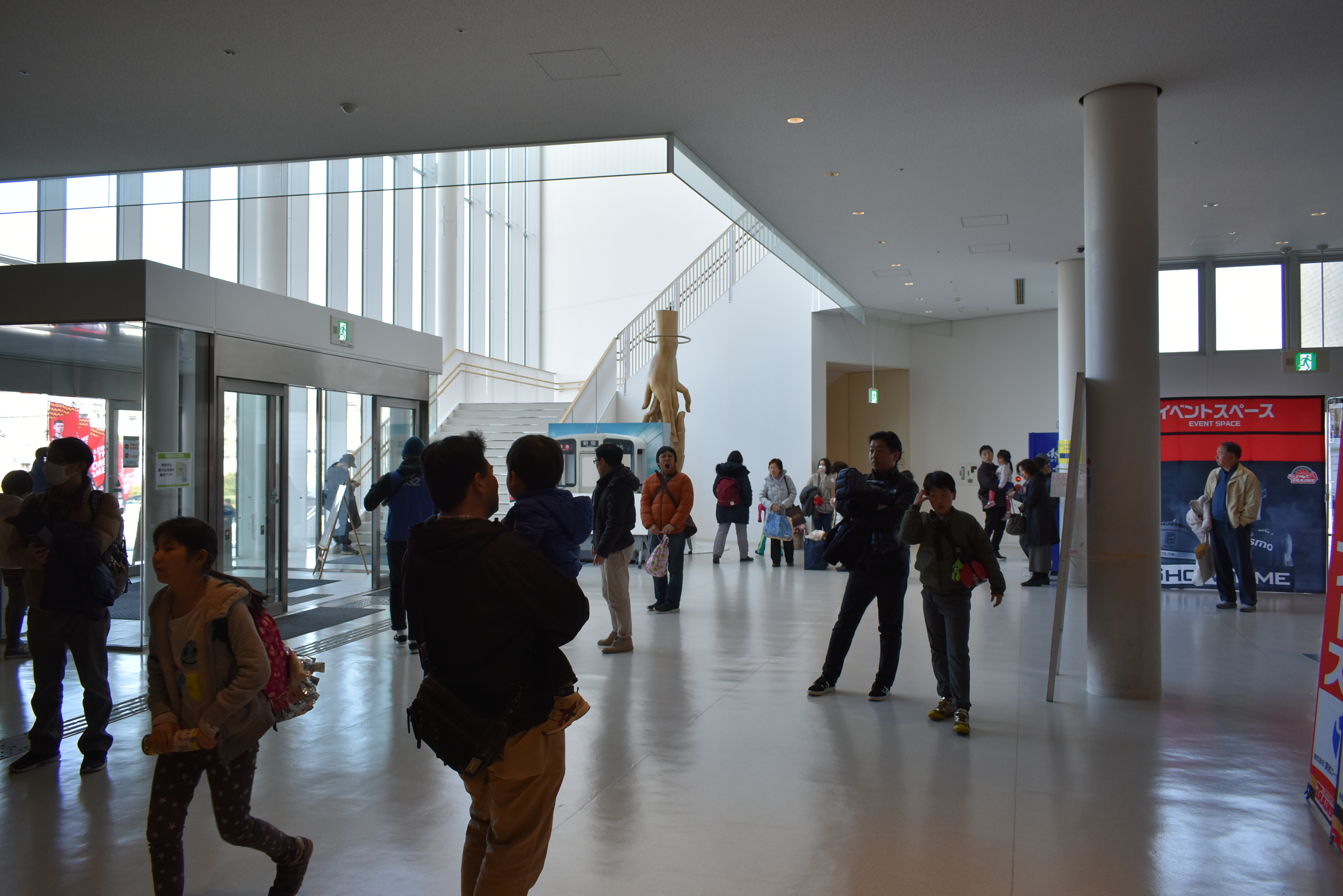

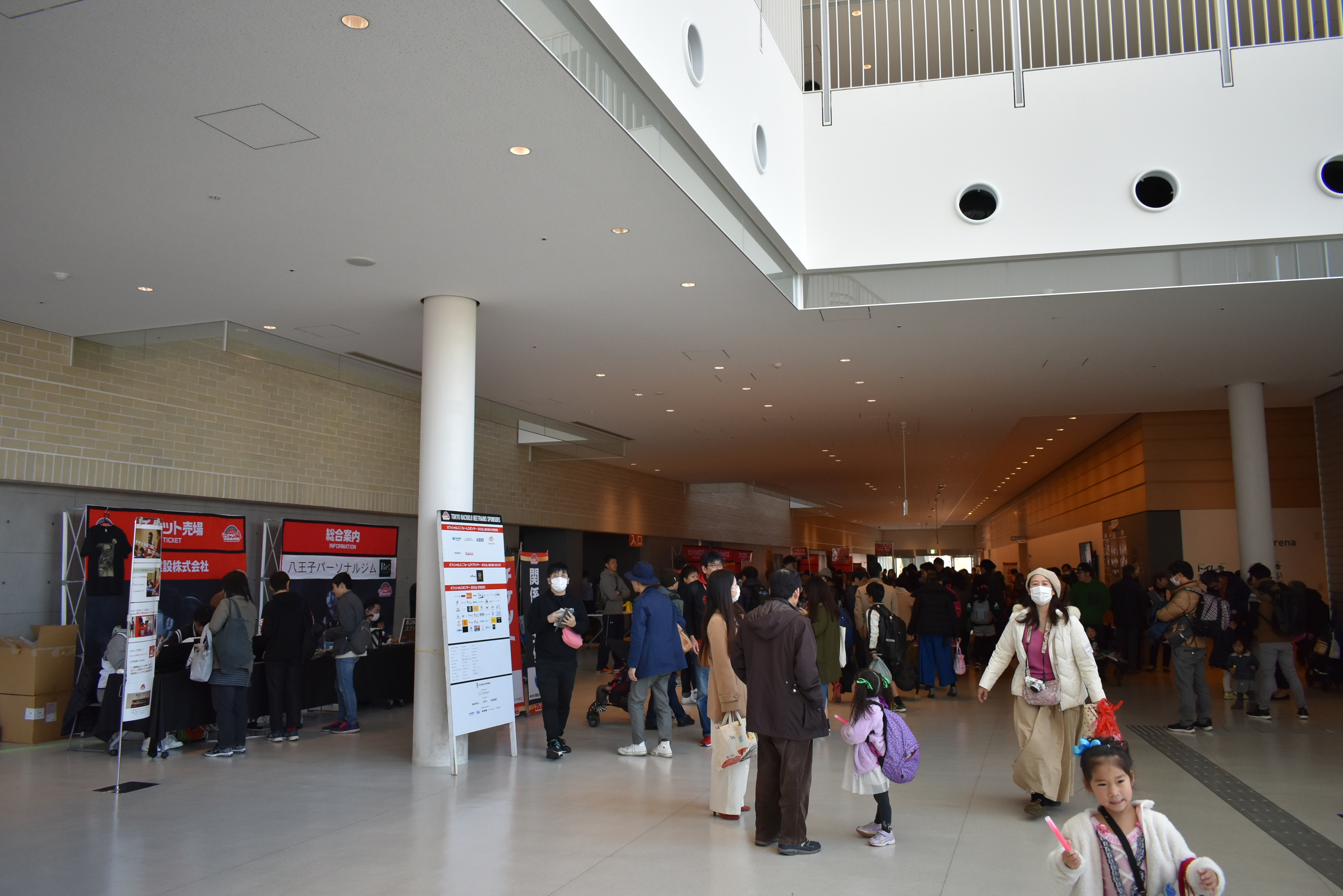

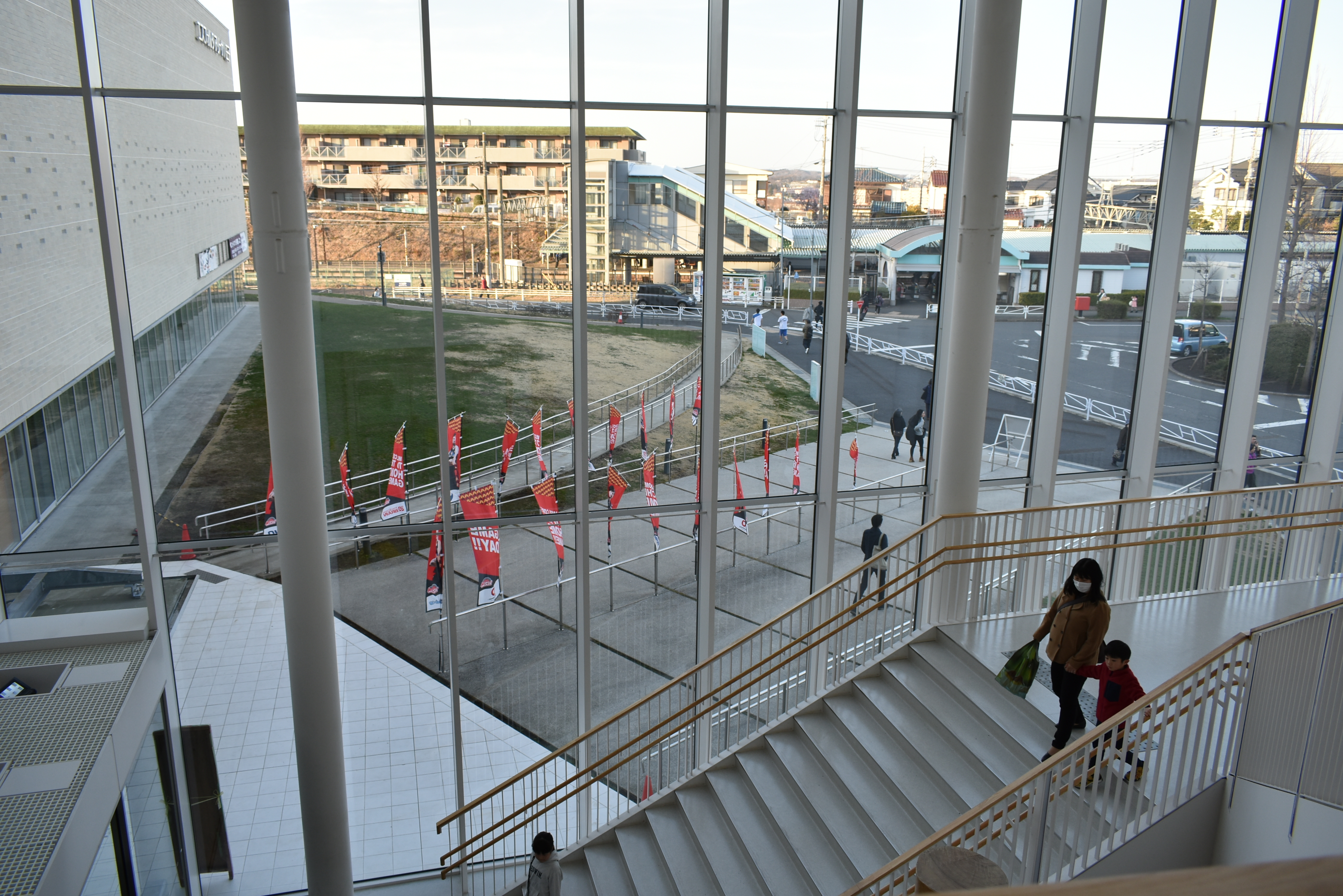
