= Andresito =

Spanish futsal player

Personal information
- Full name: Andrés Alcántara Prieto
- Date of birth: 24 March 1991 (age 35)
- Place of birth: Córdoba, Spain
- Position: Wing

Team information
- Current team: Nagoya Oceans
- Number: 8

Senior career*
Years	Team	Apps	(Gls)
2006–07	Adecor Grupo Pinar		
2007–09	L.M. Aquasierra Elefrío		
2009–10	Cartagena		
2010–16	Ribera Navarra		
2016–20	ElPozo Murcia		
2020–22	Cartagena		
2022–	Nagoya Oceans		

International career
- Spain
- * Club domestic league appearances and goals

Andrés Alcántara Prieto (born 24 March 1991), commonly known as Andresito, is a Spanish futsal player who plays for Nagoya Oceans as a Wing.
