= Danny Breen (actor) =

American actor (1950–2017)

Daniel Breen
- Born: October 11, 1950; Cleveland, Ohio, U.S.
- Died: December 29, 2017 (aged 67); Los Angeles, California, U.S.
- Occupations: Actor, Comedian, television producer

Daniel Breen (October 11, 1950 – December 29, 2017) was an American actor, comedian, and television producer.

== Career ==
Breen, an alumnus of The Second City in Chicago, is known for his role in an HBO sketch comedy series, Not Necessarily the News, from 1983 to 1990. More recently, Breen produced the popular improv comedy series Whose Line Is It Anyway?, as well as The Wayne Brady Show.

Breen was a native of Cleveland, Ohio. In 1975, he visited Chicago to see a friend, actress Miriam Flynn, perform in The Second City comedy troupe. Breen believed he could do the same, so he moved to Chicago to pursue improv comedy. He joined the Reification Company and the better known Second City during the late 1970s. In 1979, Breen began performing a series of revues at Second City alongside Jim Belushi, Tim Kazurinsky, and George Wendt.

During the 1980s, Breen and his then-wife, actress Nonie Newton, relocated to Los Angeles, on the advice of actress and fellow Second City alumna Audrie J. Neenan, to take a job as a writer for an HBO sketch comedy, Not Necessarily the News. He was soon promoted to the on-screen cast and appeared in Not Necessarily the News from 1983 until the end of the series in 1990.

In addition to his work on that show, Breen's roles included guest appearances on The Golden Girls, The Wonder Years, Full House, Seinfeld, Frasier, Curb Your Enthusiasm, and The Drew Carey Show.

Off screen, Breen became a television producer for Whose Line Is It Anyway? and The Wayne Brady Show, a talk show starring Wayne Brady in the early 2000s.

== Death ==
Breen died on December 29, 2017, at his home in Los Angeles, California, at the age of 67, following a seven-year battle with cancer. He was survived by two children, Spencer and Riley.

A tribute to Breen was featured in the credits of the Whose Line Is It Anyway? episode that originally aired on July 16, 2018.
