= Wallace Shawn on screen and stage =

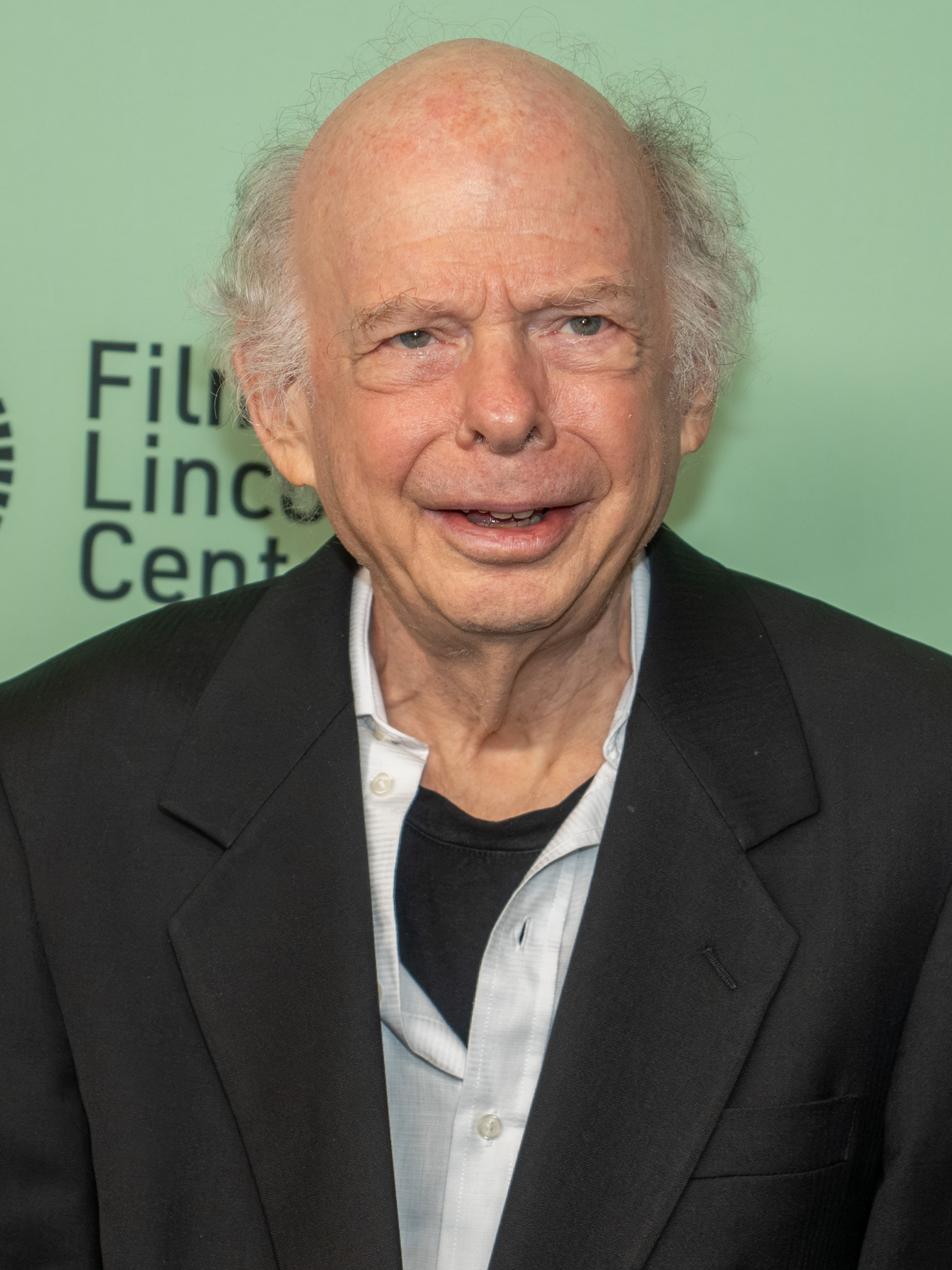
Shawn in 2025

Wallace Shawn is an American actor known for his appearances on stage and screen. He has also worked as a writer for film and the theatre, and has occasionally worked as a director and producer.

== Film ==
Year	Title	Role	Notes	Ref.
1979	Manhattan	Jeremiah		
1979	Starting Over	Workshop Member		
1979	All That Jazz	Assistant Insurance Man		
1980	Simon	Eric Van Dongen		
1980	Atlantic City	Waiter	Credited as Wally Shawn	
1981	Cheaper to Keep Her	Mugger		
1981	My Dinner with Andre	Wally Shawn	Also writer	
1981	Strong Medicine	Birthday Party Guest	Uncredited	
1982	A Little Sex	Oliver		
1983	Lovesick	Otto Jaffe		
1983	The First Time	Jules Goldfarb		
1983	Strange Invaders	Earl		
1983	Deal of the Century	Harold DeVoto		
1984	Crackers	Turtle		
1984	The Hotel New Hampshire	Freud		
1984	The Bostonians	Mr. Pardon		
1984	Micki & Maude	Elliot Fibel		
1985	Heaven Help Us (Catholic Boys)	Father Abruzzi		
1985	Head Office	Mike Hoover		
1987	The Bedroom Window	Henderson's Attorney		
1987	Radio Days	Masked Avenger		
1987	Nice Girls Don't Explode	Ellen		
1987	Prick Up Your Ears	John Lahr		
1987	The Princess Bride	Vizzini		
1988	The Moderns	Oiseau		
1989	She's Out of Control	Dr. Herman Fishbinder		
1989	Scenes from the Class Struggle in Beverly Hills	Howard Saravian		
1989	We're No Angels	Translator		
1991	Shadows and Fog	Simon Carr		
1992	Unbecoming Age	Dr. Block		
1992	Nickel & Dime	Everett Willits		
1992	The Double 0 Kid	Cashpot	Direct-to-video	
1992	Mom and Dad Save the World	Sibor		
1993	The Cemetery Club	Larry		
1993	The Meteor Man	Mr. Little		
1994	Mrs. Parker and the Vicious Circle	Horatio Byrd		
1994	Vanya on 42nd Street	Vanya		
1995	Just Like Dad	Stan Speigel		
1995	The Wife	Cosmo		
1995	Napoleon	Echidna	Voice role; North American dub	
1995	Canadian Bacon	Canadian Prime Minister Clark MacDonald		
1995	A Goofy Movie	Principal Mazur	Voice role	
1995	Clueless	Mr. Wendell Hall		
1995	Toy Story	Rex	Voice role	
1996	House Arrest	Vic Finley		
1996	All Dogs Go to Heaven 2	Labrador MC	Voice role	
1997	Vegas Vacation	Marty		
1997	Just Write	Arthur Blake		
1997	Critical Care	Furnaceman		
1997	The Designated Mourner	—N/a	Writer	
1998	The Jungle Book: Mowgli's Story	Tarzan Chimp	Voice role; direct-to-video	
1999	The Diary of the Hurdy-Gurdy Man			
1999	Toy Story 2	Rex	Voice role	
1999	My Favorite Martian	Dr. Elliot Coleye		
2000	Buzz Lightyear of Star Command: The Adventure Begins	Rex	Voice role; direct-to-video	
2000	The Prime Gig	Gene		
2001	The Curse of the Jade Scorpion	George Bond		
2001	Monsters, Inc.	Rex	Cameo voice role; outtakes	
2002	Personal Velocity: Three Portraits	Mr. Gelb		
2002	Love Thy Neighbor			
2003	Duplex	Herman		
2003	The Haunted Mansion	Ezra		
2004	Teacher's Pet	Crosby Strickler	Voice role	
2004	Melinda and Melinda	Sy		
2004	Marie and Bruce	—N/a	Writer only	
2004	The Incredibles	Gilbert Huph	Voice role	
2004	The Fever	—N/a	Writer only	
2005	Chicken Little	Principal Fetchit	Voice role	
2006	Air Buddies	Billy	Voice role; direct-to-video	
2006	Southland Tales	Baron Von Westphalen		
2006	Tom and Jerry: Shiver Me Whiskers	Barnacle Paul	Voice role; direct-to-video	
2007	Happily N'Ever After	Munk	Voice role	
2007	Strange Culture	Himself	Documentary	
2007	I Could Never Be Your Woman	Math Teacher	Uncredited	
2008	Kit Kittredge: An American Girl	Mr. Gibson		
2008	The Windmill Movie	Himself	Documentary	
2008	Scooby-Doo! and the Goblin King	Mr. Gibbles	Voice role; direct-to-video	
2008	Mia and the Migoo	Migoo	Voice role; English dub	
2009	Jack and the Beanstalk	Broker / Booker / Lancelot Squarejaw		
2009	Capitalism: A Love Story	Himself	Documentary	
2010	Toy Story 3	Rex	Voice role	
2010	Furry Vengeance	Dr. Christian Burr	Uncredited	
2010	Cats & Dogs: The Revenge of Kitty Galore	Calico	Voice role	
2010	Tea Time	—N/a	Writer only; short film	
2011	Hawaiian Vacation	Rex	Voice role; short film	
2011	The Speed of Thought	Sandy		
2011	Small Fry	Rex	Voice role; short film	
2012	A Late Quartet	Gideon Rosen		
2012	Partysaurus Rex	Rex	Voice role; short film	
2012	Vamps	Van Helsing		
2013	Admission	Clarence		
2013	Andre Gregory: Before and After Dinner	Himself	Documentary	
2013	The Double	Mr. Papadopoulos		
2013	A Master Builder	Halvard Solness	Also writer and producer	
2014	Don Peyote	Psychotherapist		
2014	The Last Impresario	Himself	Documentary	
2015	Maggie's Plan	Kliegler		
2015	Robo-Dog	Mr. Willis	Direct-to-video	
2016	Drawing Home	Mr. Garfield		
2017	Animal Crackers	Mr. Woodley	Voice role	
2017	The Only Living Boy in New York	David		
2017	Someone Else's Wedding	Albert		
2018	Book Club	Derek		
2019	Toy Story 4	Rex	Voice role	
2019	Marriage Story	Frank		
2020	Timmy Failure: Mistakes Were Made	Mr. Crocus		
2020	Rifkin's Festival	Mort Rifkin		
2021	The Addams Family 2	Mr. Mustela	Voice role	
2023	Dancing on the Silk Razor	Narrator (voice)	Short film	
2025	The Clock	Harold Jenkins	Short film	
2026	Toy Story 5	Rex	Voice role	

== Television ==
Year	Title	Role	Notes
1982–83	Taxi	Arnie Ross	2 episodes
1983	How to Be a Perfect Person in Just Three Days	Professor Silverfish	Television film
1983	Saigon: Year of the Cat	Frank Judd	Television film
1987–91	The Cosby Show	Jeff Engels	5 episodes
1992	Civil Wars	Riley Baker	Episode: "A Bus Named Desire"
1992	One Life to Live	Professor Marvel	Unknown episodes
1993	Eligible Dentist		Pilot
1993	The Pink Panther	The Little Man (voice)	Episode: "Ice Blue Pink/Pink Trek"
1993	Matrix	Mr. Gonley	Episode: "Lapses in Memory"
1993–99	Star Trek: Deep Space Nine	Grand Nagus Zek	7 episodes
1994	The Nanny	Charles Haste	Episode: "Pishke Business"
1994–97	Murphy Brown	Stuart Best	4 episodes
1995	Kalamazoo	Bobby	Short
1995	Something Wilder	Roof Inspector	Episode: "Dr. Roof"
1995	Just Like Dad	Stan Speigel	Television film
1996	Toy Story Treats	Rex (voice)	18 episodes
1996–97	Clueless	Mr. Hall	17 episodes
1997	King of the Hill	Philip Ny (voice)	Episode: "How to Fire a Rifle Without Really Trying"
1998	Blind Men		Pilot
1998	Noah	Zack	Television film
1998	The Lionhearts	Various (voice)	5 episodes
1999	Homicide: Life on the Street	Frank Hopper	Episode: "A Case of Do or Die"
1999	Cosby	Mr. Fleming	2 episodes
2000–01	Teacher's Pet	Crosby Strickler (voice)	17 episodes
2001	Ally McBeal	Mr. Dune	Episode: "Falling Up"
2001	Blonde	I. E. Shinn	2 episodes
2001	Three Sisters	Dean Webb	Episode: "Don't Be Thrown"
2001–06	Crossing Jordan	Howard Stiles	8 episodes
2001, 2006, 2011	Family Guy	Bertram (voice)	3 episodes
2002	Sun Gods	Spaulding	Pilot
2002	Teamo Supremo	Gauntlet (voice)	Episode: "Running the Gauntlet"
2002	Mr. St. Nick	Mimir	Television film
2003	Monte Walsh	Colonel Wilson	Television film
2003	Stanley	Mr. Goldberg (voice)	Episode: "Going-Away Goose/Time to Climb!"
2004	Sex and the City	Martin Grable	Episode: "Splat!"
2004	Karroll's Christmas	Zeb Rosecog	Television film
2005	Fat Actress	Sigmund von Oy	Episode: "The Koi Effect"
2005	Stargate SG-1	Arlos Kadawam	Episode: "The Ties That Bind"
2005	Desperate Housewives	Lonny Moon	Episode: "They Asked Me Why I Believe in You"
2006	The 12th Man	Marty	Pilot
2006	Law & Order: Criminal Intent	Film Professor	Episode: "Weeping Willow"
2008	The Return of Jezebel James	Garson Leeds	Episode: "I'm with Blank"
2008	Cashmere Mafia	Animal Handler	Episode: "Dog Eat Dog"
2008–09	The L Word	William Halsey	5 episodes
2009	Law & Order: Special Victims Unit	Roy Batters	Episode: "Snatched"
2009	Life on Mars	Stephen Morrell – "The Sorcerer"	Episode: "Let All the Children Boogie"
2009	ER	Teddy Lempell	Episode: "The Beginning of the End"
2010	The Daily Show with Jon Stewart	Alan Rubin	Episode: "Anthony Weiner"
2010	Damages	Sterling Biddle	Episode: "Don't Forget to Thank Mr. Zedeck"
2008–12	Gossip Girl	Cyrus Rose	11 episodes
2011–12	Eureka	Warren Hughes	3 episodes
2011–16	Kung Fu Panda: Legends of Awesomeness	Taotie (voice)	9 episodes
2012	Fish Hooks	Rat King (voice)	Episode: "Guys' Night Out"
2013–15	The Good Wife	Charles Lester	3 episodes
2013	Adventure Time	Rasheeta (voice)	Episode: "Puhoy"
2013	The Fog of Courage	Eustace Bagge (voice)	Short
2013	Uncle Grandpa	Ule Gapa (voice)	Episode: "Belly Bros"
2013	Toy Story of Terror!	Rex (voice)	Television special
2014	Toy Story That Time Forgot	Rex (voice)	Television special
2014	Phineas and Ferb	Saul (voice)	Episode: "Phineas and Ferb Save Summer"
2014	The Mysteries of Laura	Kenneth Walters	Episode: "The Mystery of the Sex Scandal"
2014	Club Penguin: Monster Beach Party	Gary the Gadget Guy (voice)	Television special
2014	The 7D	Not-So-Magic Mirror (voice)	Episode: "Mirror, Mirror"
2014	BoJack Horseman	Himself (voice)	Episode: "One Trick Pony"
2014	Christmas at Cartwright's	Harry Osbourne	Television film
2014–18	Mozart in the Jungle	Winslow Elliot	6 episodes
2015	Club Penguin: Halloween Panic!	Gary the Gadget Guy (voice)	Television special
2016	The Night Shift	Mr. Neville	Episode: "Unexpected"
2016	Life in Pieces	Samuel	Episode: "Eyebrow Anonymous Trapped Gem"
2016	Regular Show	The Evil Brain (voice)	Episode: "The Brain of Evil"
2016–19	The Stinky & Dirty Show	Tall (voice)	18 episodes
2017	Cop and a Half: New Recruit	Principal Miller	Television film
2017	Mr. Robot	Mr. Williams	Episode: "eps3.2_legacy.so"
2017	Graves	Jerry North	3 episodes
2017	She's Gotta Have It	Julius Kemper	2 episodes
2017–18	OK K.O.! Let's Be Heroes	Wally the White, The Magic Court Narrator (voice)	2 episodes
2017–18	Trollhunters	Unkar the Unfortunate (voice)	2 episodes
2017, 2019	The Marvelous Mrs. Maisel	Herb Smith	2 episodes
2018	The Good Fight	Charles Lester	Episode: "Day 471"
2018	Skylanders Academy	Mabu Inspector (voice)	Episode: "Weekend at Eon's"
2018	Law & Order: Special Victims Unit	Benjamin Edelman	Episode: "Alta Kockers"
2018–24	Young Sheldon	Dr. John Sturgis	52 episodes
2019	Big City Greens	Jyle Donelan (voice)	Episode: "Night Bill"
2019	The Simpsons	Wallace the Hernia (voice)	Episode: "I Want You (She's So Heavy)"
2019	Butterbean's Cafe	Oopsie Doodle (voice)	Episode: "Oopsie Doodle!"
2019	Forky Asks a Question	Rex (voice)	Episode: "What Is Time?"
2020	Search Party	William Badpastor	2 episodes
2020	Esme & Roy	Grumbles (voice)	Episode: "Princess of Play"
2020–21	Summer Camp Island	Morris Mole / Barry / Pete (voices)	3 episodes
2021–22	Amphibia	Humphrey Westwood (voice)	2 episodes
2021–22	He-Man and the Masters of the Universe	Orko the Great (voice)	Minor role
2021	Gossip Girl	Cyrus Rose	Episode: "Final Cancellation"
2022–24	Evil	Father Frank Ignatius	10 episodes
2022	Bubble Guppies	Professor Puny (voice)	Episode: "Search for the Great Silverback!"
2024	The Bravest Knight	Rumpelstiltskin (voice)	Episode: "Cedric & Rumpelstiltskin"
2025	Krapopolis	John Fate (voice)	Episode: "John Fate Comes a-Knockin"
2025	Super Duper Bunny League	Oggnegg Captain (voice)	Episode: "The Bunnies Save Christmas"
2026	SpongeBob SquarePants	Piney (voice)	Episode: "Home Away from Home"

== Video games ==
Year	Title	Voice role	Notes
1995	Disney's Animated Storybook: Toy Story	Rex	
1996	Toy Story: The Video Game	Rex	
1996	Toy Story Activity Center	Rex	
1999	Toy Story 2: Buzz Lightyear to the Rescue	Rex	
2004	The Incredibles	Gilbert Huph	
2006	Family Guy Video Game!	Bertram	
2008	The Princess Bride Game	Vizzini	
2010	Toy Story 3: The Video Game	Rex	
2012	Kinect Rush: A Disney-Pixar Adventure	Rex, Gilbert Huph	
2012	Family Guy: Back to the Multiverse	Bertram	
2013	Disney Infinity	Rex	
2014	Disney Infinity 2.0	Rex	
2015	Disney Infinity 3.0	Rex	
2016	King's Quest	Manny/Manannan	
2016	Disney Magic Kingdoms	Rex	
2018	Lego The Incredibles	Gilbert Huph	Archive recordings
2019	Kingdom Hearts III	Rex	
2026	Disney Speedstorm	Rex	

== Theatre ==
=== As playwright ===
Year	Title	Premiere	Ref.
1967	Four Meals in May		
1970	The Family Play		
1970	The Hotel Play	La MaMa Experimental Theatre Club, August, 1981	
1971	The Hospital Play		
1975	Our Late Night	The Public Theater, 1975	
1976	A Thought in Three Parts	The Public Theater, 1976	
1976	Mr. Frivolous	Odyssey Theatre Ensemble, 1980	
1977	The Mandrake (translation)	The Public Theater, 1977	
1978	Marie and Bruce	Odyssey Theatre Ensemble, 1982; also 2004 screenplay	
1985	Aunt Dan and Lemon	Unicorn Theatre, 1986	
1990	The Fever	Woolly Mammoth Theatre Company, 1991	
1996	The Designated Mourner	National Theatre, 1996	
2006	The Threepenny Opera (translation)	Roundabout Theatre Company (Studio 54), 2006	
2006	The Music Teacher (libretto)	Minetta Lane Theatre, 2006	
2008	Grasses of a Thousand Colors	The Public Theater (co-production with Theatre for a New Audience), 2013	
2015	Evening at the Talk House	National Theatre, 2016	
2026	What We Did Before Our Moth Days	Greenwich House Theater, 2026	

=== As actor ===
Year	Title	Role	Venue	Ref.
1978	The Master and Margarita	Behemoth	The Public Theater	
2000	The Designated Mourner	Jack		
2005	Hurlyburly	Artie	Acorn Theatre at Theatre Row	
2007	The Fever	The Traveler	Acorn Theatre at Theatre Row	
2007	Rebel Voices		Mercer Street Theater	
2013	The Designated Mourner		The Public Theater	
2013	Grasses of a Thousand Colors	The Memoirist	The Public Theater	
2015–2016	Evening at the Talk House	Dick	National Theatre	
2017	Evening at the Talk House		Pershing Square Signature Center	
2021	Waiting for Godot	Lucky		
2026	The Fever	The Traveler	Greenwich House Theatre	
