= What We Did Before Our Moth Days =

- 2026 Off-Broadway poster.
- Written by: Wallace Shawn
- Characters: Dick; Tim; Elle; Elaine

Premiere
- Date: March 5, 2026
- Place: Greenwich House Theatre

What We Did Before Our Moth Days is a play written by American actor and writer Wallace Shawn. The show opened Off-Broadway at the Greenwich Street Theatre on March 5, 2026, under the direction of André Gregory. The play received positive reviews from critics.

A "moth day", coined by the character of Dick, is a euphemism for the day someone dies.

== Synopsis ==
Set in an "urban world of intelligent and somewhat gentle middle-class people", a father (Dick), mother (Elle), son (Tim), and the long-time mistress of the father (Elaine) tell the intertwined story of their lives.

== Production history ==
Off-Broadway (2026)

Gregory, who has an extensive history of collaboration with Shawn, claimed that Shawn had "charmed him into coming back to the stage. Gregory had not directed theatre since a 2013 production of The Master Builder, which was later adapted into a film by Jonathan Demme. Both the film and staging starred Shawn.

The play was announced on September 9, 2025, where Hope Davis, Maria Dizzia, John Early, and Josh Hamilton were revealed to star. The staging was produced by Scott Rudin and Barry Diller. The play marks Rudin's first return to production work after accusations of abusive behaviour were levied against him in 2021.

Previews began on February 4, 2026 at the Greenwich House Theatre in New York City. The play officially premiered on March 5, 2026. In repertory with Moth Days, Shawn performed his solo performance The Fever, which won the 1991 Obie Award for best play.

After receiving two extensions, a final performance occurred on May 24, 2026.

== Original cast and characters ==
=== Original 2026 cast ===
- Dick - Josh Hamilton
- Tim - John Early
- Elle - Maria Dizzia
- Elaine - Hope Davis

=== Notable replacements ===
- Elle - Deborah Eisenberg
- Elaine - Wallace Shawn

== Critical reception ==
Helen Shaw from The New York Times gave the play a "Critics' Pick" designation, writing that the play had a "purgative effect", "in which venting the energies from a sordid guilt offers catharsis". In a piece for Exuent NYC, Loren Noveck wrote that whether an audience member finds the play "mesmerizing or interminable will depend on how [one] feels about Shawn's playwriting in general". In a feature for IndieWire, Ryan Lattanzio described the play as "searing and often caustically funny".

== See also ==
- My Dinner with Andre
