= André Gregory =

French-American theatre director, writer and actor (born 1934)

- Born: André William Josefowitz; May 11, 1934 (age 92); Paris, France
- Occupations: Actor; director; writer
- Years active: 1956–2016
- Known for: My Dinner with Andre
- Spouses: Mercedes "Chiquita" Nebelthau (died 1992); Cindy Kleine (m. 2000)
- Children: 2

André William Gregory (born André William Josefowitz; May 11, 1934) is a French-born American theatre director, writer and actor. He is best known for co-writing and starring in My Dinner with Andre, a 1981 film directed by Louis Malle, alongside his protégé Wallace Shawn. Gregory studied acting at The Neighborhood Playhouse School of the Theatre in New York City.

== Early life ==
Gregory was born André William Josefowitz in Paris, France, in 1934 to Russian Jewish parents. His family fled from France to London in 1939 before moving to the United States, where he grew up in Los Angeles. The family subsequently changed its surname from Josefowitz to Gregory. As an adult, Gregory discovered that his father was probably a Nazi sympathizer, as he represented Russia in Germany for IG Farben, the German chemical conglomerate that produced the Zyklon B gas used in Nazi concentration camps.

Gregory's parents were extremely wealthy, and as a child Gregory spent summers in Westwood, Los Angeles, in a house on Sunset Boulevard rented to them by writer Thomas Mann. He recalls house parties where celebrities they met through Marlene Dietrich (whom they knew from their time in Berlin) were present, including the Marx Brothers, Greta Garbo, Fred Astaire, and Errol Flynn (who had an affair with Gregory's mother). Gregory has called his parents "wretched, negligent and self-absorbed, petty and often mean" and his father "the most frightening person in my life"; he spent much of his adulthood in therapy.

Gregory's love for acting came after he played Petruchio in a production of Shakespeare's The Taming of the Shrew when he was 12 years old. He studied at Harvard University, where he was affiliated with Adams House.

== Career ==
=== 1960s and 1970s ===
During the 1960s and 1970s, Gregory directed several avant-garde productions developed through ensemble collaboration, the most famous of which was Alice in Wonderland (1970), based on Lewis Carroll's Alice's Adventures in Wonderland and Through the Looking-Glass.

In 1964, Gregory was hired as artistic director of a new company in Philadelphia, Theatre of the Living Arts. He ran the company for three years, garnering national recognition, until leaving in 1967 after a conflict with the board of directors over the controversial premiere of Rochelle Owens's Beclch.

Gregory founded his own theatrical company, The Manhattan Project, in 1968. In 1975 he directed Our Late Night, the first produced play by Wallace Shawn, which began a long working relationship between the two men.

Shortly afterward, Gregory's growing misgivings about the role of theater in modern life and what he felt was a trend toward fascism in the United States led him to abruptly abandon theater and leave the country. As described in the film My Dinner with Andre (1981), he traveled at director Jerzy Grotowski's invitation to Poland, where he developed several experimental theatrical events for private audiences. He spent several years in various esoteric communities, such as Findhorn, developing an interest and practice in New Age beliefs.

=== 1980s and 1990s ===
Gregory's best-known film performance is as the title character in My Dinner with Andre, directed by Louis Malle, in which he and Shawn, playing fictionalized versions of themselves, have a long conversation over dinner. They discuss Gregory's spiritual sojourn in Europe and his doubts about the future of theater and of Western civilization in general. Co-written by Gregory and Shawn, it was filmed over two weeks at the Jefferson Hotel in Richmond, Virginia, on a set designed to resemble the Café des Artistes in New York, and premiered at the 1981 Telluride Film Festival. Championed by critic Roger Ebert, the film won the award for Best American Film of 1981 at the 2nd Boston Society of Film Critics Awards; Gregory and Shawn won Best Screenplay for the film at the same ceremony.

Gregory appeared with Goldie Hawn in Protocol (1984). In 1988 he played the father in Some Girls. In 1993, he appeared in the movie Demolition Man. Other notable character actor roles he played include John the Baptist in The Last Temptation of Christ (1988), Reverend Spellgood in The Mosquito Coast (1986), and Dante in The Linguini Incident (1991).

Gregory returned to the theater several times to direct small productions, usually for invited audiences. These included a long-running workshop of Anton Chekhov's Uncle Vanya (adapted by David Mamet) in New York, which was developed from 1990 to 1994 and featured Shawn and Julianne Moore. Though never publicly performed, a filmed rehearsal was released as Vanya on 42nd Street in 1994. Gregory also directed a radio production of Shawn's 1996 play The Designated Mourner in 2002.

=== 2000s onward ===
Returning to theater, Gregory directed Shawn's play Grasses of a Thousand Colors, which premiered at the Royal Court Theatre in London in 2009. He next worked with Shawn on a new version of Henrik Ibsen's The Master Builder. This resulted in the film Fear of Falling (2013), directed by Jonathan Demme; the film was retitled A Master Builder at its opening in New York in June 2014.

In 2013, Gregory directed Grasses of a Thousand Colors and The Designated Mourner, starring Shawn in a co-production of Theatre for a New Audience and The Public Theater in New York. A 2013 documentary about Gregory's life, Andre Gregory: Before and After Dinner, was directed by his wife, Cindy Kleine. He and Kleine discussed it on the May 3, 2013, episode of Charlie Rose. After working on it for seven years, Gregory released his memoir, This Is Not My Memoir (with Todd London; Farrar, Straus and Giroux, ISBN 9780374298548), in 2020.

== Marriages and family ==
Gregory was first married to Mercedes "Chiquita" Nebelthau, a documentary filmmaker who died of cancer in 1992. They had two children. In 2000, he married filmmaker Cindy Kleine; at the time, Kleine was 39 and Gregory was 66. They have lived in Truro, Massachusetts, on Cape Cod, since the early 2000s.

== Filmography ==
Film roles of Andre Gregory
Year	Title	Role	Notes
1981	My Dinner with Andre	Andre Gregory	Also co-writer
1982	Author! Author!	J.J.	
1984	The Soldier's Tale	The Narrator	Voice
1984	Protocol	Nawaf Al Kabeer	
1985	Always	Party Philosopher	
1986	The Mosquito Coast	Reverend Spellgood	
1987	Street Smart	Ted Avery	
1988	The Last Temptation of Christ	John the Baptist	
1988	Some Girls	Mr. D'Arc	
1990	The Bonfire of the Vanities	Aubrey Buffling	
1991	The Linguini Incident	Dante	
1993	Demolition Man	Warden William Smithers – Aged	
1994	The Shadow	Burbank	
1994	Vanya on 42nd Street	André Gregory	Also writer
1995	Last Summer in the Hamptons	Ivan Axelrod	
1997	Hudson River Blues	Will	
1998	Goodbye Lover	Rev. Finlayson	
1998	Celebrity	John Papadakis	
2003	Judge Koan	Zen Master (voice)	Also executive producer
2008	Phyllis and Harold	N/A	Executive producer
2013	A Master Builder	Knut Brovik	Also producer

Television roles of Andre Gregory
Year	Title	Role	Notes
1983–1986	Great Performances	Mad Hatter / Dimitri Weismann	2 episodes; "Alice in Wonderland", "Follies in Concert"
1993	TriBeCa	Professor	Episode; "Heros Exoletus"
1999	Bonne Nuit	Patrice	Television film
2016	The Young Pope	Elmore Coen	2 episodes
