= Kathryn Pogson =

English film and stage actress

- Born: 1954 (age 70–71); Halifax, West Riding of Yorkshire, England
- Occupation: Actress
- Spouse: Stuart Browne
- Website: diamondmanagement.co.uk/kathryn-pogson

Kathryn Pogson (born 1954) is an English film and stage actress. She appeared in Terry Gilliam's 1985 cult film Brazil. She was nominated for a Drama Desk Award for Best Actress for her performance in the 1986 New York production of Aunt Dan and Lemon.

She grew up in Halifax, West Riding of Yorkshire, where she attended Crossley & Porter Grammar School. She has appeared on television many times, including appearances in We'll Meet Again, Midsomer Murders, Vera and Foyle's War.

== Work ==
=== Theatre work ===
- Jack and the Beanstalk | Fairy Dewdrop | Bacup Empire | Gloria Parkinson
- Macbeth | Lady Macbeth | Theatremobile
- Twelfth Night | Viola | The Dukes, Lancaster
- The Arbor | Girl | Royal Court Theatre
- Hedda Gabler | Thea Elvsted | Roundhouse
- Touched | Betty | Royal Court Theatre
- At Home | Two Hander | Riverside Studios
- Hamlet | Ophelia | Donmar Warehouse
- The Shelter | The Woman | Lyric Theatre, London
- 1983 Masterpieces | Rowena | Royal Court Theatre
- 1984 The Lucky Chance | Leticia | Royal Court Theatre
- 1985 Deadlines | Jane Carberry | Royal Court Theatre
- 1985 Aunt Dan and Lemon | Lemon | Royal Court Theatre | The Public Theater | won Drama Desk Award for Outstanding Actress in a Play
- 1987 The Balcony | Carmen | Royal Shakespeare Company | Terry Hands
- 1987 A Midsummer Night's Dream | Helena | Royal Shakespeare Company
- 1988 One Way Pendulum | Sylvia | Old Vic
- 1989 Richard II | Queen Isabel | Phoenix Theatre, London
- 1989 Richard III | Lady Anne | Phoenix Theatre, London
- 1990 Nightingale | Florence | Dimson Theatre NY
- 1991 The Lady from the Sea | Ellida | Women's Playhouse Trust
- 1992 The Crackwalker | Sandy | Gate Theatre
- 1995 The Fairy Queen | Helena | Lisbon
- 1997 The Cenci | Lucretia | Almeida Theatre
- 1997 The Brutality of Fact | Maggie | New End Theatre
- 1997 The Merchant of Venice | Portia | The Globe Theatre | Richard Olivier
- 1997 The Honest | Viola | The Globe Theatre | Jack Shepherd
- 1998 The Snow Palace | Stanislava | Sphynx – Tricycle and Oslo | Janet Suzman
- 2001 Cherished Disappointments in Love | Her | Sphinx – Helsinki State Theatre | Sue Parish
- 2002 Just Between Ourselves | Vera | No 1 Tour | Dominic Hill
- 2003 Girl Watching | Polly | Birmingham Rep/Tour | Natasha Betteridge
- 2005 Carver | Woman | Arcola | William Gaskill
- 2009 Legacy | Dorothy Whitney Elmhirst | Theatre of Angels (National Tour) | Maria Pattinson
- 2011 Sixty-Six Books: The Foundation | Theta | Bush Theatre | Peter Gill
- 2012 Blood Wedding | The Mother | Royal & Derngate, Northampton | Laurie Sansom
- 2012 The Bachae | Agave | Royal & Derngate, Northampton | Laurie Sansom
- 2015 Antigone | Eurydice | Barbican | Ivo van Hove
- 2019 My Brother's Keeper | Mrs Stone | The Playground Theatre | Craig Gilbert

=== Filmography ===
Year	Title	Role
1983	The Pattern of Roses	May, The Past
1984	The Company of Wolves	Young Bride
1985	Brazil	Shirley
1985	Mrs Capper's Birthday	Audrey
1987	The Happy Valley	June Carberry
1989	Somewhere to Run	Liz
1995	The Chemistry Lesson	Mrs. Clifford
1996	Eskimo Day	Malcolm's Mum
1997	Brass Eye	Various
1999	Captain Jack	Teacher
2000	The Last of the Blonde Bombshells	Young Elizabeth's Mum
2002	AKA	Freddy Furnish
2004	Millions	St. Clare
2005	Breakfast on Pluto	Mrs. Henderson
2008	The Life Class	Bird
2010	The Arbor	Pamela Dunbar
2019	Maude	Title character of Maude. 19-minute short film.

=== Television ===
Year	Title	Role	Episode
1979	Thomas and Sarah	Doris	The Biters Bit
1982	We'll Meet Again	Vi Blair	
1984	Strangers and Brothers	Joan Royce	3 episodes
1997	Reckless	Phyllis	
2023	Doctors	Judith Marsh	Episode: "Coming Back to Life"
