= Vanya on 42nd Street =

1994 film

- Theatrical release poster
- Directed by: Louis Malle
- Written by: Andre Gregory
- Based on: Uncle Vanya by Anton Chekhov, adapted by David Mamet
- Produced by: Fred Berner
- Starring: Phoebe Brand; Lynn Cohen; George Gaynes; Jerry Mayer; Julianne Moore; Larry Pine; Brooke Smith; Wallace Shawn; Andre Gregory
- Cinematography: Declan Quinn
- Edited by: Nancy Baker
- Music by: Joshua Redman
- Production company: Mayfair Entertainment
- Distributed by: Sony Pictures Classics
- Release date: September 13, 1994
- Running time: 119 minutes
- Country: United States
- Language: English
- Box office: $1,746,050

Vanya on 42nd Street is a 1994 American comedy-drama film directed by Louis Malle, written by Andre Gregory, and starring Wallace Shawn and Julianne Moore. The film is an intimate, interpretive performance of the 1899 play Uncle Vanya by Anton Chekhov as adapted by David Mamet. It is Malle’s last film.

== Premise ==
Actors in New York City rehearse Uncle Vanya in a dilapidated theatre.

== Cast ==
- Wallace Shawn as Vanya
- Julianne Moore as Yelena
- Larry Pine as Dr. Astrov
- Brooke Smith as Sonya
- George Gaynes as Prof. Serebryakov
- Phoebe Brand as Marina/Nanny
- Jerry Mayer as Telegin/Waffles
- Lynn Cohen as Vonenskaya/Maman

The film also features Madhur Jaffrey and Andre Gregory as himself. Shawn, Gregory, and Malle had previously collaborated on the 1981 film My Dinner with Andre. Several actors known to the New York stage are featured, including George Gaynes, Larry Pine, Phoebe Brand, Brooke Smith, and Lynn Cohen.

Moore, whose film career was gaining critical attention because of her performance in Short Cuts, was prominently featured in the advertising campaign for the film.

The soundtrack features music by the Joshua Redman Quartet, with Redman on tenor saxophone, Brad Mehldau on piano, Christian McBride on bass, and Brian Blade on drums.

== Production ==
Over the course of three years, director Andre Gregory and a group of actors came together on a voluntary basis in order to better understand Chekhov's work through performance workshops. Staged entirely within the vacant shell of the then-abandoned New Amsterdam Theater on 42nd Street in New York City, they enacted the play rehearsal-style on a bare stage with the actors in street clothes. Free from any commercial demands, their performances were for an invited audience only. Gregory and director Louis Malle decided to document the play as they had developed it. The film was the result of the collaborative process. It was the last film of Malle's career.

=== Filming ===
Workshop rehearsals with Gregory and the cast originally took place at the abandoned Victory Theater on 42nd Street in New York City. The filmed version was shot entirely within the New Amsterdam Theatre, also on 42nd Street. Built in 1903, the theatre was the original home of the Ziegfeld Follies, a historical tidbit mentioned in the film during some pre-show banter. In the late 1930s, the New Amsterdam Theatre was transformed into a movie palace. The theatre remained a movie palace until it "temporarily" closed in 1982.

At the time Vanya on 42nd Street was filmed, the theatre had been abandoned for over ten years and was in a state of severe disrepair. Rats had chewed through much of the stage rigging, and flooding and mice made the stage unusable, so that they were restricted to a section of what had been the orchestra.

For the film production, some rows of seats were removed and a small platform was built for the cast and film crew. Shortly after the production of Vanya, the New Amsterdam was leased to The Walt Disney Company. Disney restored the theatre to its grand original design and reopened it in 1997.

== Reception ==
=== Critical response ===
Vanya on 42nd Street received mostly positive reviews from critics. On the review aggregator website Rotten Tomatoes, the film has an 89% approval rating, based on 37 reviews. The website's consensus reads, "Beautiful performances and the subtle hand of master Louis Malle make this adaptation of Chekov's Uncle Vanya an eccentric presentation of an enduring classic." Roger Ebert gave the film three-and-a-half out of four stars in his review for the Chicago Sun-Times. "As he did with My Dinner with Andre", Ebert wrote, "[Malle shows] he is the master of a visual style suited to tightly-encompassed material. There is not a shot that calls attention to itself, and yet not a shot that is without thought."

=== Year-end lists ===
- 1st – Peter Rainer, Los Angeles Times
- 2nd – Stephen Hunter, The Baltimore Sun
- 2nd – Michael Mills, The Palm Beach Post
- 3rd – Bob Strauss, Los Angeles Daily News
- 5th – Kevin Thomas, Los Angeles Times
- 5th – David Elliott, The San Diego Union-Tribune
- 7th – Gene Siskel, The Chicago Tribune
- 9th – Kenneth Turan, Los Angeles Times
- 9th – Robert Denerstein, Rocky Mountain News
- Top 10 (listed alphabetically, not ranked) – Mike Clark, USA Today
- Top 10 (not ranked) – Betsy Pickle, Knoxville News-Sentinel
- Top 10 runner-ups (not ranked) – Janet Maslin, The New York Times
- Honorable mention – Glenn Lovell, San Jose Mercury News
- Honorable mention – William Arnold, Seattle Post-Intelligencer
