= Cindy Kleine =

American filmmaker

- Born: United States
- Education: Tufts University; Bard College
- Occupations: Film director, producer, video artist
- Spouse: Andre Gregory (m. 2000)

Cindy Kleine is an American film director, producer and video artist.

She grew up on Long Island. In 2000, she married actor and filmmaker Andre Gregory. Kleine's 2013 documentary Andre Gregory: Before and After Dinner is about him. It was funded through Kickstarter.

Kleine studied film at The Museum School and the MIT Film/Video Section, studying with Richard Leacock. She received a Bachelor of Fine Arts from Tufts University and the School of the Museum of Fine Arts in 1983 and a Master's of Fine Arts from Bard College in 1996.

Kleine's films have been shown at many film festivals, including Telluride, Seattle, San Francisco, Vancouver, the Boston Independent Film Festival, at the It's All True International Documentary Festival in Brazil, the DOK Leipzig International Festival, and the Santa Fe International Film Festival. Her film Doug and Mike, Mike and Doug (1989), about artists Doug and Mike Starn- Starn Twins, was broadcast on PBS's POV Film Series.

Kleine's film Phyllis and Harold (2008) is about her parents' 59-year marriage. The film won Best Feature Length Documentary at the 2009 World Jewish Film Festival, in Ashkelon, Israel, and the Orson Welles Award for Innovative Filmmaking at the 2008 Iowa Independent Film Festival. Kleine's other films include Inside Out (2004), Til Death Do Us Part (1998), Secrets of Cindy (1983), Passage (1991) and Holy Matter (1996).

Kleine has worked at Boston College (1985–98), Harvard University (1990–91), School of the Museum of Fine Arts (1996–97) and The New School (1996–98).
