= The Designated Mourner =

- Written by: Wallace Shawn
- Characters: Judy; Howard; Jack

The Designated Mourner is a play written by Wallace Shawn in 1996.

The play was ranked the 10th greatest American play of the past 25 years in a 2018 list by The New York Times critics.

== Plot ==
The play takes place in what seems to be the present or in the near future, in an unnamed Western country (implied at points to be the United Kingdom) that is undergoing political conflict similar to what had occurred in many Latin American countries during the Cold War: a ruling oligarchy with fascist tendencies, threatened by a communist guerrilla movement based in the lower class, the former imprisoning and executing anyone suspected of subversion, including writers and intellectuals who have no direct connection to the guerrillas.

One of these intellectuals is Howard, a respected poet who wrote political essays in his youth; his daughter Judy and her husband Jack are also at risk of becoming suspects by association. Jack, an embittered English professor, is the play's chief narrator. He is generally uninterested in politics, but is somewhat sympathetic toward the government's murderous acts for two reasons: he secretly resents Howard as a representative of the "highbrow" culture, and he fears that his middle-class world would be wiped out if the rebels succeeded. As political repressions worsen, Jack withdraws from his family and from reality. Howard is killed due to an arbitrary decision by the government, Judy is arrested and subsequently executed for unclear reasons, and Jack, after recovering from his nervous breakdown, is left as the sole survivor of Howard's literary circle.

There is no visible action in the play or the film; the three characters describe their memories in separate fragments of monologue (as in Samuel Beckett's Play), with brief scenes of dialogue between them.

Though the play is generally more realistic than Shawn's previous politically charged work The Fever, it focuses on the characters' emotional lives and leaves the civil war in the background. As a result, many reviewers of the play and film have been unclear as to whether the assassinated characters were killed by the government for sympathizing with the rebels, or (as Jack fears) by the rebels, for being privileged academics. A close reading of the play suggests that the rebels (if they even existed) have not gained power, and that what has occurred is a purge by one faction of the regime. Writing in Time Out New York about the conclusion to the film, Andrew Johnston stated that "the film's final scene, in which Jack has an epiphany that inverts the one experienced by Winston Smith at the end of 1984, is sublimely harrowing. Like all great political art, Mourner offers no easy answers; instead, it uses the bond between the audience and the characters to jerk us out of our apathy and remind us that it's always later than we think."

== Productions ==
The play made its world premiere on April 18, 1996 at the Royal National Theatre in London under the direction of David Hare. The cast included Mike Nichols, Miranda Richardson and David de Keyser.

The North American premiere of The Designated Mourner was staged in March 1997 by the Steppenwolf Theatre Company in Chicago, directed by Les Waters, with David Shapiro as Jack, Martha Lavey as Judy, and Nicholas Rudall as Howard. The play was then staged at the Tarragon Theatre in Toronto beginning September 16, 1997, under the direction of Daniel Brooks.

Andre Gregory subsequently directed a stage production in New York City in 2000 and a radio play, both of which featured Wallace Shawn as Jack, Deborah Eisenberg as Judy, and Larry Pine as Howard. The play was revived in 2017 at Redcat (Roy and Edna Disney/CalArts Theater). The production was directed by André Gregory, featuring the same cast from the New York production, and was presented by Alex Westerman. A 2026 revival, also directed by Gregory and co-directed by Lukas Gregory, is set to premiere on October 21, 2026 with Shawn, Eisenberg, and Pine returning to their roles.

== Film adaptation ==
The Designated Mourner
- Directed by: David Hare
- Written by: Wallace Shawn
- Produced by: David Hare; Donna Grey
- Starring: Mike Nichols; Miranda Richardson; David de Keyser
- Cinematography: Oliver Stapleton
- Edited by: George Akers
- Music by: Richard Hartley
- Production companies: BBC; First Look Pictures; Greenpoint Films
- Distributed by: First Look Pictures
- Release date: 2 May 1997
- Running time: 94 minutes
- Country: United Kingdom
- Language: English
- Box office: $ 63,000

In 1997 David Hare adapted the play into a film. The film follows the play's script closely and is based on the original London stage production, also directed by Hare. The original actors from the 1996 production reprised their roles in the film.

The film was shot over the course of three days at Pinewood Studios in London.
