= K. P. Kumaran =

Indian film director

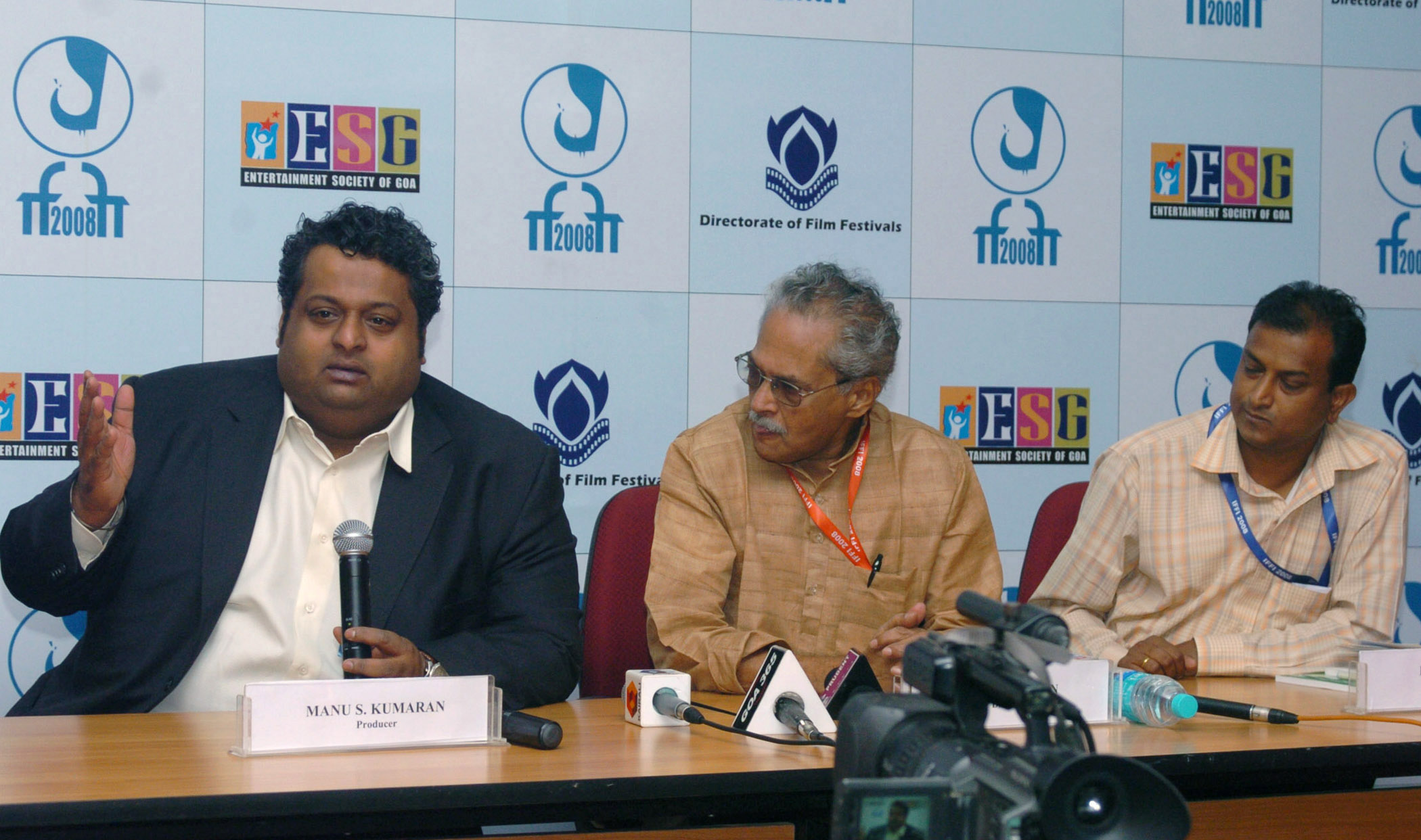
- K. P. Kumaran at the IFFI 2008
- Born: Kerala, India
- Occupation: Film director
- Awards: National Film Award (1989)

K. P. Kumaran is an Indian film maker who works in the Malayalam cinema. He co-authored the script of Swayamvaram directed by Adoor Gopalakrishnan. Kumaran's first directorial venture was Athithi. His major films include Rugmini (winner of the 1989 National Film Award for Best Feature Film in Malayalam), Thenthulli, Laxmivijayam and Thottam. His latest film, Akasha Gopuram, is based on Henrik Ibsen's play The Master Builder.

Kumaran's first directorial venture was Rock (short film), which won an international award. His first feature film was Adhithi. He was bestowed with the J. C. Daniel Award for 2021.

== Filmography ==
- Thenthulli (1979)
- Rock (short film)
- Athithi (debut feature film)
- Rugmini
- Thenthulli
- Laxmivijayam
- Thottam
- Akasha Gopuram (2008)
- Swayamvaram (1972) (as co-scriptwriter)
- Grama vrikshathile kuyil

== Awards and honours ==
In 2022, for his overall contribution to the Malayalam film industry, he received J. C. Daniel Award, the highest honour in Malayalam cinema. In 2023, he received the Chalachitra Ratnam Award instituted by the Kerala Film Critics Association for his overall contribution to the Malayalam film industry.
