= Andre Gregory: Before and After Dinner =

- Film poster
- Directed by: Cindy Kleine
- Starring: Andre Gregory; Wallace Shawn
- Release date: April 3, 2013
- Country: United States
- Language: English

Andre Gregory: Before and After Dinner is a 2013 documentary about film and theater director and actor Andre Gregory.

The film was funded through Kickstarter.
