= Aakasha Gopuram =

2008 Indian film directed by K. P. Kumaran

- Theatrical release poster
- Directed by: K. P. Kumaran
- Screenplay by: K. P. Kumaran
- Based on: The Master Builder by Henrik Ibsen
- Produced by: Tutu J. Sharma; Taizoon F. Khorakiwala; Manu S. Kumaran
- Starring: Mohanlal; Nithya; Bharat Gopy; Manoj K. Jayan; Sreenivasan; Geetu Mohandas; Shwetha Menon
- Cinematography: Santosh Thundiyil
- Edited by: B. Ajithkumar
- Music by: John Altman Rajeev Alunkal (Lyrics)
- Production companies: Medient & Tarlac
- Release date: 22 August 2008
- Country: India
- Language: Malayalam

Aakasha Gopuram (transl. Castle in the Air) is a 2008 Indian Malayalam-language drama film written and directed by K. P. Kumaran. It is a cinematic adaptation of Norwegian writer Henrik Ibsen's 1892 play The Master Builder.

The film stars Mohanlal, Nithya, Bharath Gopi, Manoj K. Jayan, Sreenivasan, Geetu Mohandas, and Shwetha Menon. Santosh Thundiyil handled the cinematography of the film, while British composer John Altman composed the music. The lyrics were written by Rajeev Alunkal.

The film received a positive response from critics, and the music was praised by the audience.

== Plot ==
Akasha Gopuram is set among the Indian immigrant community in London and tells the story of Albert Samson, a middle-aged architect who has clawed his way to prominence. His single-minded focus on his job, however, has hardened him and prevented him and his wife, Alice, from having a meaningful family life. The costs of Samson's ambition are also symbolized in his assistant, Abraham Thomas, Samson's former employer whom he treated badly to reach the top. Thomas, now dying, wants his son, Alex, to have more independence in the firm. Samson, however, fears that he will be eclipsed by a younger generation of architects and neither allows Alex to design original houses nor leave the firm and strike out on his own.

Into this situation enters Hilda Varghese, a young woman who idolized Samson ten years ago, in the early stages of his career, when he built a large church in her hometown and climbed to the top of its tower during its dedication ceremony. At the time Samson had promised "a kingdom" to Hilda, then a girl of twelve, who now earnestly believes that he has come to honor that promise.

As Samson struggles with the destructive consequences of his pursuit of glory and his growing fear that he has lost his creative powers, the mysterious Hilda helps him gain a glimpse of his former self.

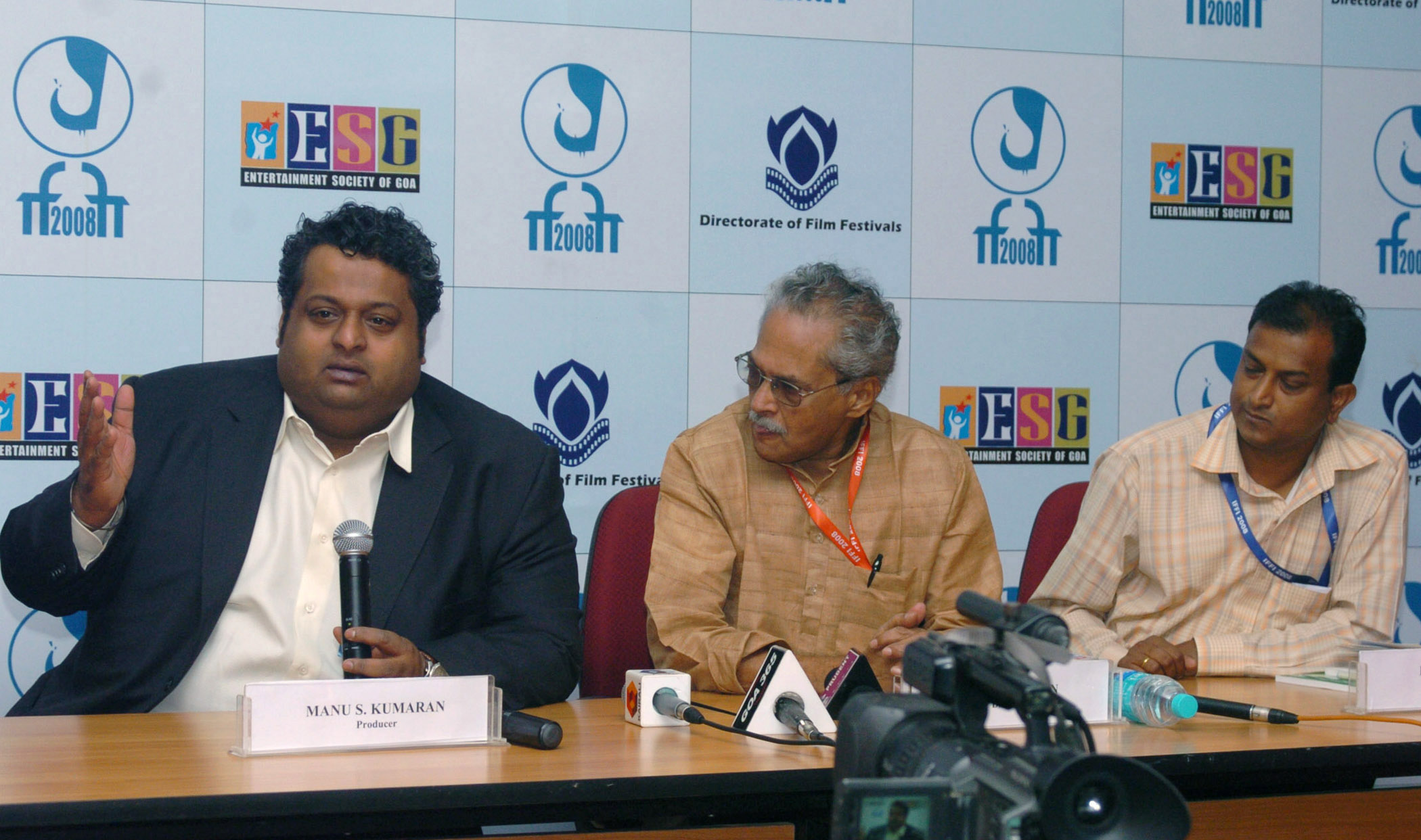
Producer Manu S. Kumaran (left) and director K. P. Kumaran, addressing the press on the film, at IFFI (2008)

== Cast ==
- Mohanlal as Albert Samson
- Nithya as Hilda Varghese
- Shweta Menon as Alice
- Bharat Gopy as Abraham Thomas
- Sreenivasan as Dr. Isaac
- Manoj K. Jayan as Alex
- Geetu Mohandas as Catherine

== Casting ==
The film marked the official Malayalam film debut of Nithya Menen. About her casting in the film, Nithya Menon, in an interview with Rediff said, "It happened very strangely and was almost like destiny. I was in the middle of my 12th exams when I had appeared on the cover of a tourism book. Mohanlal saw the picture and I got a call from the film's director. He talked to me and I was selected for the role. Everything happened very quickly."

== Release ==
It had a premiere in Kochi. It was selected for the Indian Panorama section at the International Film Festival of India.
