= Julie Hagerty =

American actress (born 1955)

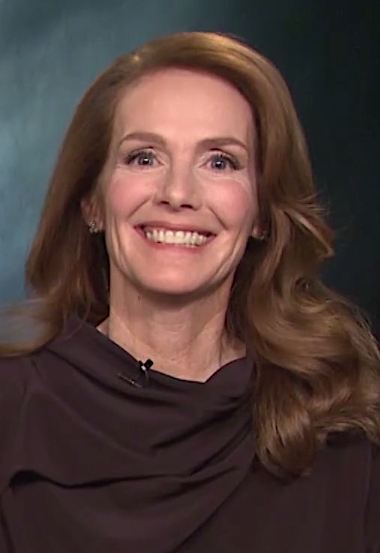
- Hagerty during an interview in 2019
- Born: Julie Beth Hagerty; June 15, 1955 (age 71); Cincinnati, Ohio, U.S.
- Education: Indian Hill High School
- Occupations: Actress; model
- Years active: 1979–present
- Known for: Elaine Dickinson in Airplane! Linda Howard in Lost in America
- Spouses: Peter Burki (m. 1986; div. 1991) Richard Kagan (m. 1999)

Julie Beth Hagerty (born June 15, 1955) is an American actress. She starred as Elaine Dickinson in the films Airplane! (1980) and Airplane II: The Sequel (1982). Her other film roles include A Midsummer Night's Sex Comedy (1982), Lost in America (1985), What About Bob? (1991), She's the Man (2006), A Master Builder (2014), Instant Family (2018), Noelle, Marriage Story (both 2019), and A Christmas Story Christmas (2022).

== Early life and education ==
Hagerty was born in Cincinnati, Ohio, the daughter of Harriet Yuellig (née Bishop), a model and singer, and Jerald William "Jerry" Hagerty Jr., a musician. Her brother Michael Hagerty was also an actor. Her parents later divorced. Hagerty attended Indian Hill High School. She was signed as a model for Ford Models at 15, and spent summers modeling in New York City. She moved there in 1972 and worked at her brother's theater group; she also studied with actor William Hickey.

== Career ==
Hagerty made her off-Broadway debut in 1979, starring in Mutual Benefit Life at her brother's theater, The Production Company. In 1983 she appeared Off-Broadway at the Vandam Theatre in Shel Silverstein's 'Wild Life' directed by Art Wolff. It was an ensemble theatre piece co-starring Christopher Murney, W.H. Macy, Henderson Forsythe, Conard Fowkes, Jody Gelb, Howard Lee Sherman and Raynor Scheine. She continued appearing on stage, including starring in a Broadway version of The House of Blue Leaves. Her first film role was in All That Jazz, but her small part was cut out of the finished film. She was subsequently cast opposite Robert Hays in the parody film, Airplane! It was released in June 1980 and became the third-highest grossing comedy in box office history at that time, behind Smokey and the Bandit (1977) and National Lampoon's Animal House (1978). Airplane! established Hagerty as a noted comedic actress. She reprised her role in Airplane II: The Sequel (1982).

Hagerty spent the 1980s starring in a number of theatrical films, ranging from Woody Allen's A Midsummer Night's Sex Comedy (1982) and the well-reviewed Albert Brooks film Lost in America (1985) to the badly received Beyond Therapy (1987). Her roles often involved a naive or spaced-out character who seems to be unaware of whatever chaos was surrounding her, as exemplified in Airplane! and Airplane II: The Sequel. Throughout the 1990s and 2000s, Hagerty mostly appeared in television films or supporting roles in Hollywood films, including the '90s comedies What About Bob? and Noises Off, as well as a part in the 2005 film Just Friends and 2006's She's the Man.

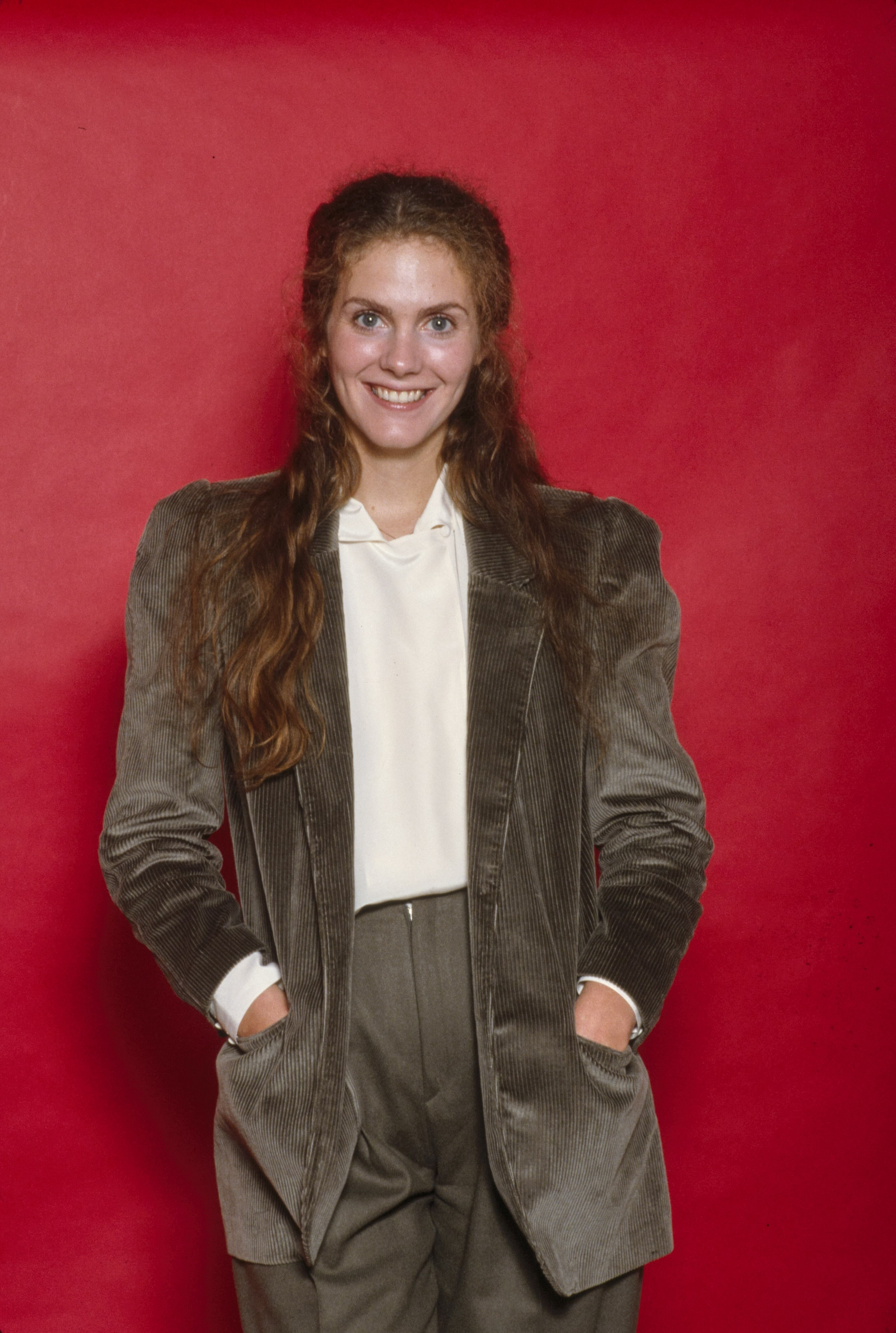
Hagerty in the 1980s

In 1991, she starred alongside Fran Drescher and Twiggy in Princesses, a sitcom that aired for five weeks on CBS. She was cast in the 1994 Designing Women spin-off Women of the House, but was committed to another project when filming began, so Valerie Mahaffey substituted for her in several episodes. She eventually joined the cast, filmed two episodes, and resigned, handing the role back to Mahaffey, who bowed out after one final appearance. In 1998, Hagerty starred in the short-lived sitcom Reunited. In 1999, she played Charlotte Sterling in Everybody Loves Raymond.

In 2000, she narrated the audiobook version of The Trolls, a children's novel by Polly Horvath. In 2002, she appeared in the Broadway revival of Morning's at Seven. In 2003, she began a recurring role as a babysitter named Polly on Malcolm in the Middle. She appeared as Hazel Bergeron in 2081, the film adaptation of Kurt Vonnegut's short story "Harrison Bergeron". Starting in 2011, she took over as the voice of Carol, Lois's sister, on Family Guy. In 2013, she starred in A Master Builder and appeared in a series of Old Navy commercials as an old and charming flight attendant modeled on her character by Elaine in Airplane!. In 2015, she made another cameo appearance as a flight attendant in Larry Gaye: Renegade Male Flight Attendant. She had a recurring role as a pet parapsychologist on the series Trial & Error in 2017 and appeared in the film Instant Family in 2018. In 2019 she starred in the series Black Monday, the Disney film Noelle, and the film Marriage Story.

In 2021, she was cast in the action-comedy film The Out-Laws directed by Tyler Spindel and in the romantic comedy Somebody I Used to Know, which were released in 2023. In 2022, Hagerty played Mrs. Parker, the mother of Ralphie in a sequel to the 1983 film A Christmas Story titled A Christmas Story Christmas, replacing Melinda Dillon, who originated the role in the original film but had retired from acting in 2007.

== Personal life ==
Hagerty lived with Bob Fosse during most of 1978, following Fosse's breakup with Ann Reinking. Fosse considered marrying Hagerty, but Hagerty left him as she began to succeed in her career.

She married Peter Burki in 1986. The couple divorced in 1991.

She married insurance executive Richard Kagan in 1999.

== Filmography ==
=== Film ===
Year	Title	Role	Notes
1980	Airplane!	Elaine Dickinson	
1982	A Midsummer Night's Sex Comedy	Dulcy Ford	
1982	Airplane II: The Sequel	Elaine Dickinson	
1985	Lost in America	Linda Howard	
1985	Goodbye, New York	Nancy Callaghan	
1985	Bad Medicine	Liz Parker	
1987	Beyond Therapy	Prudence	
1987	Aria	-	Segment: Les Boréades; Uncredited
1989	Bloodhounds of Broadway	Harriet MacKyle	
1989	Rude Awakening	Petra Black	
1990	Reversal of Fortune	Alexandra Isles	Uncredited
1991	What About Bob?	Fay Marvin	
1992	Noises Off	Poppy Taylor	
1995	The Wife	Rita	
1997	U Turn	Flo	
1998	Mel	Bonnie	
1999	Held Up	Gloria	
1999	The Story of Us	Liza	
2000	Baby Bedlam	Sindi	
2001	Freddy Got Fingered	Julie Brody	
2001	Storytelling	Fern Livingston	Segment: Non-Fiction
2002	Bridget	Julie	
2002	The Badge	Sister Felicia	
2003	A Guy Thing	Dorothy Morse	
2004	Marie and Bruce	Party Guest at Frank's	
2005	Adam & Steve	Sherry	
2005	Pizza	Darlene	
2005	A Host of Trouble	Sister Cletus	Short film
2005	Just Friends	Carol Brander	
2006	A Slice of 'Pizza'	Darlene	Short film
2006	She's the Man	Daphne Hastings	
2006	Pope Dreams	Kristina Venable	
2009	Confessions of a Shopaholic	Hayley	
2009	2081	Hazel Bergeron	Short film
2009	Make Up	Dorris Hallens	Short film
2013	A Master Builder	Aline Solness	
2015	Larry Gaye: Renegade Male Flight Attendant	Elevator Flight Attendant	
2018	Instant Family	Jan	
2019	Marriage Story	Sandra	
2019	Noelle	Mrs. Kringle	
2022	A Christmas Story Christmas	Mrs. Parker	She replaced Melinda Dillon, who played the role in the 1983 original.
2023	Somebody I Used to Know	Libby	
2023	The Out-Laws	Margie Browning	
2026	Remain	Louise	

=== Television ===
Year	Title	Role	Notes
1980	The Day the Women Got Even	Lisa Harris	TV film
1987	Saturday Night Live	Mother	1 episode
1987	American Playhouse	Corrinna Stroller	Episode: "The House of Blue Leaves"
1987	Trying Times	Marsha	Episode: "The Visit"
1991	Princesses	Tracy Dillon	Main role
1992	Lucky Luke	Betty Lou	Episode: "Una note di mezza estate a Daisy Town"
1995	Women of the House	Jennifer Malone	2 episodes
1996	Sesame Street	Dr. Matthews	Episode: "Big Bird Gets the Birdy Pox"
1996	London Suite	Anne Ferris	TV film
1996	Murphy Brown	Dana	2 episodes
1997	Heaven Will Wait	Jane	TV film
1997	Remember WENN	Penelope Cominger	Episode: "The First Mrs. Bloom"
1997	ER	Brenda Wilkerson	Episode: "Calling Dr. Hathaway"
1998	Tourist Trap	Bess Piper	TV film
1998	The Love Boat: The Next Wave	Carrie Brook	Episode: "I Can't Get No Satisfaction"
1998	Reunited	Nikki Beck	Main role
1999	King of the Hill	Ally	Voice, episode: "Three Coaches and a Bobby"
1999	Boys Will Be Boys	Emily Clauswell	TV film
1999	Everybody Loves Raymond	Charlotte	Episode: "Working Girl"
1999	Jackie's Back!	Pammy Dunbar	TV film
1999	The Norm Show	Wendy	Episode: "Norm vs. Denby"
1999	Chicken Soup for the Soul	Mom	Episode: "The Giving Trees"
2002	Greg the Bunny	Sandy Bender	Episode: "Father and Son Reunion"
2003	The Guardian	Helena Denby	Episode: "The Father-Daughter Dance"
2003–2004	Malcolm in the Middle	Polly	Recurring role
2004	Law & Order: Special Victims Unit	Mariel Plummer	Episode: "Careless"
2004	Girlfriends	Dr. Rachel Miller	3 episodes
2007	The Winner	Irene Abbott	Main role
2007	CSI: Crime Scene Investigation	Clarissa Niles	Episode: "Leapin' Lizards"
2009	Cupid	Liv	Episode: "The Great Right Hope"
2011–2019	Family Guy	Carol Pewterschmidt / Carol West	Voice, recurring role
2012–2013	Happy Endings	Mrs. Kerkovich	2 episodes
2014	Wilfred	Genevieve	2 episodes
2016	New Girl	Nancy	Episode: "What About Fred"
2017	Trial & Error	Madame Rhonda	Recurring role
2018	Grace and Frankie	Shirley	Episode: "The Death Stick"
2019–2020	Black Monday	Jackie Georgina	Recurring role
2025	Matlock	Bitsy	3 episodes

=== Stage ===
Year	Title	Role	Notes
1979	Mutual Benefit Life	Laura	The Production Company, Off-Broadway
1983	Wild Life	Various	Vandam Theater, Off-Broadway
1986	The House of Blue Leaves	Corrinna Stroller	Vivian Beaumont Theater, Broadway
1986	The Front Page	Peggy Grant	Vivian Beaumont Theater, Broadway
1987	Moon Over Miami	Corleen	Williamstown Theatre Festival
1993	Three Men on a Horse	Audrey Trowbridge	Lyceum Theatre, Broadway
1994	Love Letters	Melissa Gardener	Williamstown Theatre Festival
1994	A Cheever Evening	Various	Playwrights Horizons, Off-Broadway
1995	Raised in Captivity	Bernadette	South Coast Repertory
2002	Morning's at Seven	Myrtle Brown	Lyceum Theatre, Broadway
2008	The Marriage of Bette and Boo	Soot	The Public Theater, Off-Broadway
2013	Grasses of a Thousand Colors	Cerise	The Public Theater, Off-Broadway
