= Lisa Joyce =

American actress (born 1984)

- Born: December 31, 1984 (age 41); Chicago, Illinois
- Occupation: Actress
- Years active: 2006–present
- Relatives: DePaul University (BFA)

Lisa Joyce is an American actress. She is best known for playing Frieda in the comedy drama series Insecure.

== Early life ==
Joyce was born in Chicago, Illinois. She graduated with a BFA in acting from The Theatre School at DePaul University.

== Career ==
Her first big role came playing Hilde Wangel in the 2012 film A Master Builder directed by Jonathan Demme. She was nominated for a Drama Desk Award and won a Helen Hayes Award for Acting. Her first lead role was in the sitcom Billy & Billie. She played one of the lead roles in the comedy-drama series Insecure. She was originally meant to play to lead role in a HBO show called Max created by Lena Dunham but due to her working schedule on Insecure she was replaced, the show Max was not picked up for series.

== Personal life ==
She is currently living in the San Francisco Bay Area.

== Filmography ==
=== Film ===
Year	Title	Role	Notes
2007	The Brave One	CPA Worker	
2009	The Messenger	Emily	
2013	Muhammad Ali's Greatest Fight	Donna Connolly	
2013	A Master Builder	Hilde Wangel	
2015	Ricki and the Flash	Nicole	
2017	Fell	Woman	Short
2018	Human Affairs	Sarah	
2019	Casualties	May	Short

=== Television ===
Year	Title	Role	Notes
2006	Kidnapped	Lisa Cantrell	Episode;
2006	The Twilight Zone Radio Dramas	Herself	Episode; Caesar and Me
2008	Fringe	Younger Waitress	Episode; The Arrival
2009	The Unusuals	Stephanie Taft	Episode; The Apology Line
2008–2009	Law & Order	Megan Tanner, Kelly Daugherty	2 episodes
2010	Boardwalk Empire	Mary Dittrich	5 episodes
2011	The Good Wife	Lisa Banner	Episode; What Went Wrong
2013	The Following	Officer Ava Marsden	2 episodes
2014	Wallflowers	Nancy	5 episodes
2015–2016	Billy & Billie	Billie	11 episodes
2016–2021	Insecure	Frieda	19 episodes
2007–2022	Law & Order: Special Victims Unit	Michelle Young, Allie Martell, Kristi McGarrett	3 episodes
