= Wallace Shawn =

American actor and writer (born 1943)

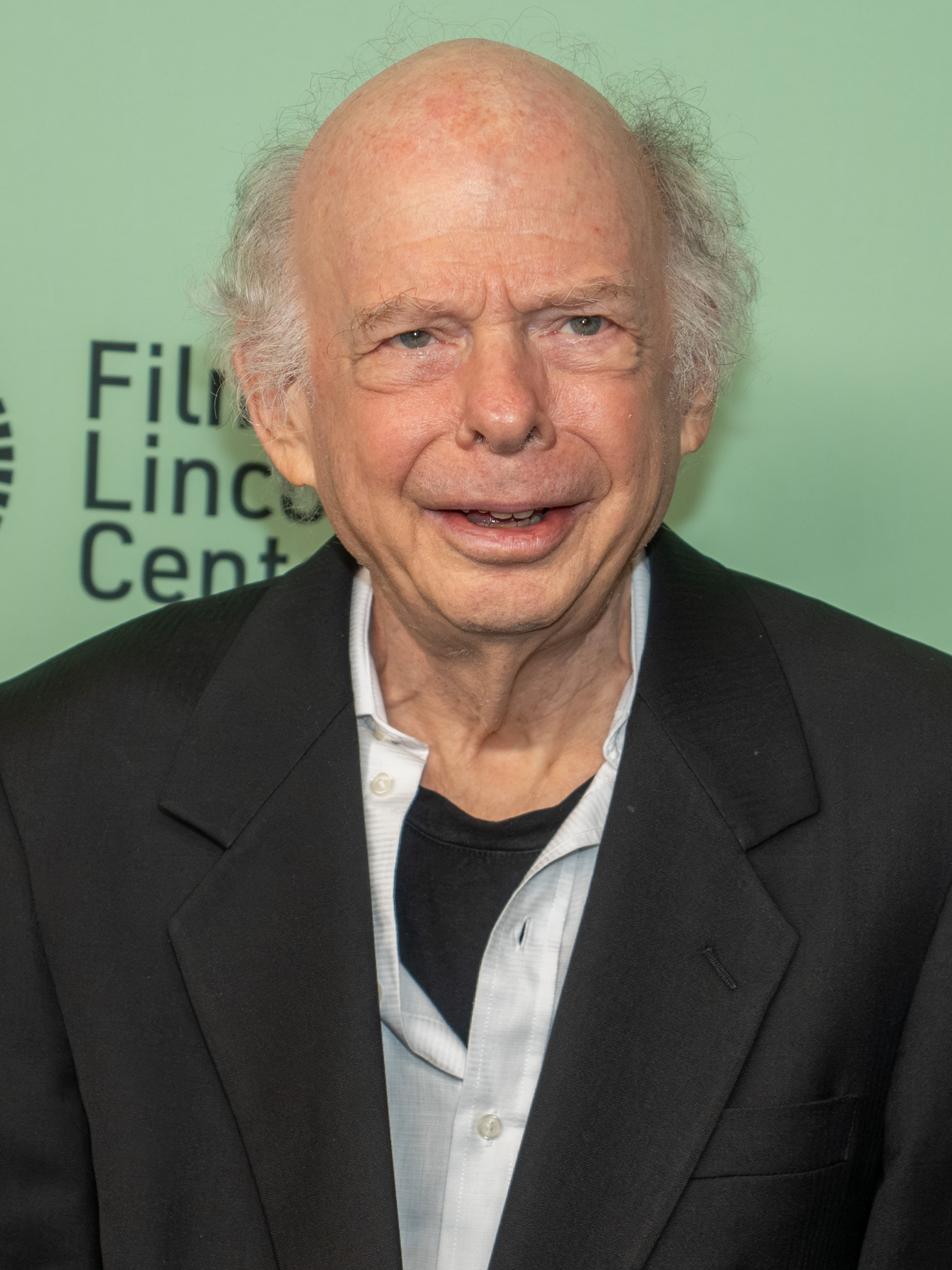
- Shawn in 2025
- Born: Wallace Michael Shawn; November 12, 1943 (age 83); New York City, U.S.
- Education: Harvard University (AB); Magdalen College, Oxford
- Occupations: Actor; essayist; writer
- Years active: 1965–present
- Notable work: Wallace Shawn on screen and stage
- Partner: Deborah Eisenberg (1972–present)
- Father: William Shawn
- Relatives: Allen Shawn (brother)

Wallace Michael Shawn (born November 12, 1943) is an American actor, essayist, and writer. He is known for playing Vizzini in The Princess Bride (1987), Mr. Hall in Clueless (1995), and Dr. John Sturgis in Young Sheldon (2017–2024), and for voicing Rex the Dinosaur in the Toy Story franchise (1995–present).

Shawn also appeared in The Bostonians (1984), Prick Up Your Ears (1987), Scenes from the Class Struggle in Beverly Hills (1989), Vanya on 42nd Street (1994), The Haunted Mansion (2003), The Incredibles (2004), Southland Tales (2006), The Double (2013), and Marriage Story (2019). He appeared in six Woody Allen films including Manhattan (1979), Radio Days (1987), and Rifkin's Festival (2020). His television work includes recurring roles as Arnie Ross in Taxi (1978-1983), Jeff Engels in The Cosby Show (1987–1991), Grand Nagus Zek in Star Trek: Deep Space Nine (1993–1999), Cyrus Rose in Gossip Girl (2008–2012), and Father Frank Ignatius in Evil (2022–2024).

Shawn is also a playwright; his plays include the Obie Award–winning Aunt Dan and Lemon (1985), The Designated Mourner (1996), Grasses of a Thousand Colors (2008), and What We Did Before Our Moth Days (2026). With Andre Gregory, he wrote and starred in the 1981 drama My Dinner with Andre. He played the title role in A Master Builder (2013), a film adaptation of Henrik Ibsen's 1892 play. Haymarket Books published his books Essays (2009) and Night Thoughts (2017).

== Early life and education ==
Wallace Michael Shawn was born on November 12, 1943, in New York City to a Jewish family. His parents were journalist Cecille (née Lyon) and William Shawn, the longtime editor of The New Yorker. He has younger twin siblings: composer Allen Shawn, and Mary, who is autistic and lives in an institution. William was the son of emigrants from Central Europe.

Shawn grew up on Manhattan's Upper East Side. He attended The Collegiate School on Manhattan's West Side before transferring to The Putney School, a private liberal arts high school in Putney, Vermont. After high school, he studied history at Harvard University, graduating in 1965 with a Bachelor of Arts. He then studied philosophy, politics and economics, as well as Latin, at Magdalen College, Oxford, originally intending to become a diplomat. He traveled to India as an English teacher on a Fulbright program.

== Career ==
=== Playwright ===
Shawn's early plays, such as Marie and Bruce (1978), portrayed emotional and sexual conflicts in an absurdist style, with language both lyrical and violent. In a conversation with Andre Gregory, parts of which were used to create My Dinner with Andre, Shawn said these plays depicted "my interior life as a raging beast." Critical response was extremely polarized: some critics hailed Shawn as a major writer, while John Simon called Marie and Bruce "garbage" and Shawn "one of the unsightliest actors in this city." His 1977 play A Thought in Three Parts caused controversy in London when the production was investigated by a vice squad and attacked in Parliament after allegations of pornographic content. Shawn received an Obie Award for playwrighting in 1975, for Our Late Night.

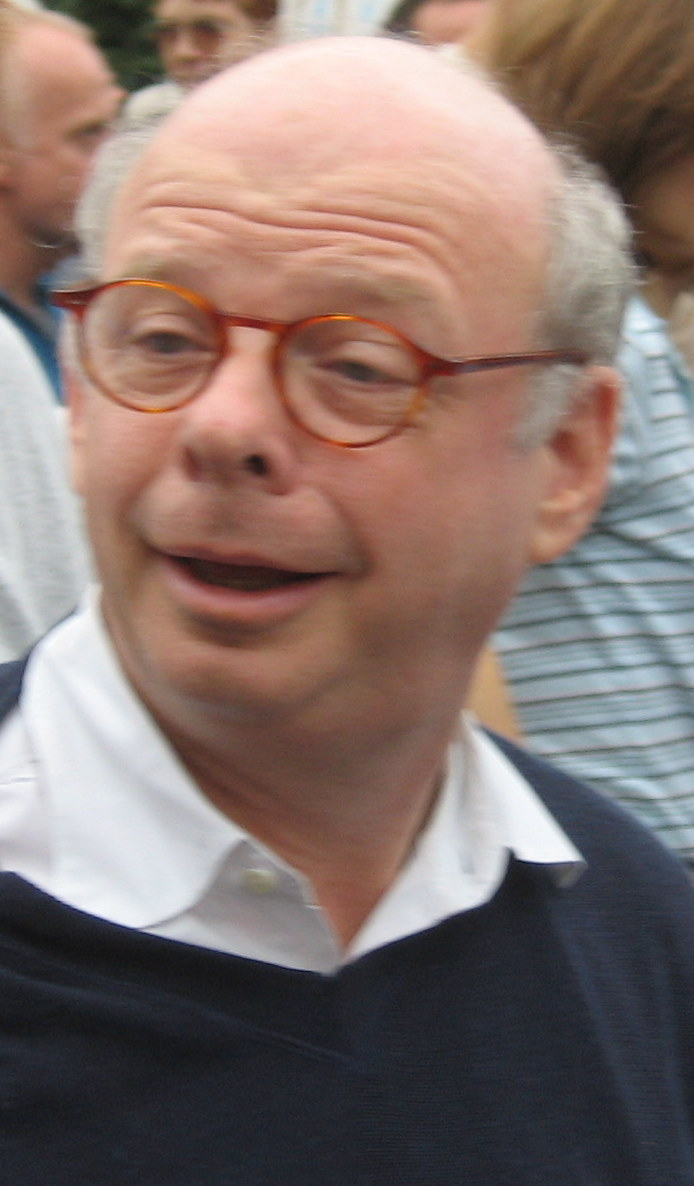
Shawn in 2005

Shawn's later plays are more overtly political, drawing parallels between his characters' psychology and the behavior of governments and social classes. Among the best-known of these are Aunt Dan and Lemon (1985) and The Designated Mourner (1997). Shawn's political work has invited controversy, as he often presents the audience with several contradictory points of view. He has called Aunt Dan and Lemon a cautionary tale against fascism. Shawn's monologue The Fever, originally meant to be performed for small audiences in apartments, depicts a person who becomes sick while struggling to find a morally consistent way to live when faced with injustice, and harshly criticizes the United States' record in supporting oppressive anti-communist regimes. In 1997, Shawn discussed the political nature of Aunt Dan and Lemon, The Fever and The Designated Mourner in an interview in which he talked extensively about the thematic connections among them, as well as his own views on Marxist, communist and socialist politics, their relevance to American liberalism, and how governmental and individual responsibilities for finding solutions to the dichotomy between rich and poor in the world take hold in his characters. Aunt Dan and Lemon earned Shawn his second Obie Award for playwrighting in 1986, and The Fever won an Obie for Best American Play in 1991. Three of Shawn's plays have been adapted into films: The Designated Mourner (basically a film version of David Hare's stage production), Marie and Bruce and The Fever. Vanessa Redgrave stars in The Fever (2004), which first aired on HBO on June 13, 2007.

Shawn has also written political commentary for The Nation, and in 2004 he published the one-issue-only progressive political magazine Final Edition, which featured interviews with and articles by Jonathan Schell, Noam Chomsky, Mark Strand and Deborah Eisenberg. Shawn is credited as translator of Bertolt Brecht's The Threepenny Opera, which opened at Studio 54 in Manhattan on March 25, 2006. He appeared briefly in voiceover during "Song about the Futility of Human Endeavor". He published his first nonfiction work, Essays, on September 1, 2009. It is a collection of essays that express his perceptions of politics and other aspects of his life.

=== Acting ===
Shawn's involvement with theater began in 1970 when he met Andre Gregory, who has since directed several of his plays. As a stage actor, he has appeared mostly in his own plays and other projects with Gregory. He made his film debut in 1979, playing Diane Keaton's ex-husband in Woody Allen's Manhattan and an insurance agent in Bob Fosse's All That Jazz. His best-known film roles include Earl in Strange Invaders (1983) and Mr. Hall in Clueless (1995). After seeing his performance in My Dinner with Andre (1981), casting director Janet Hirshenson was so fond of his delivery of the word "inconceivable" that she cast him as Vizzini in The Princess Bride (1987), for whom the word is a catchphrase. Other roles include Baron Von Westphalen in Southland Tales, Cyrus Rose on Gossip Girl, Marty in Vegas Vacation (1997), and Ezra in The Haunted Mansion (2003).

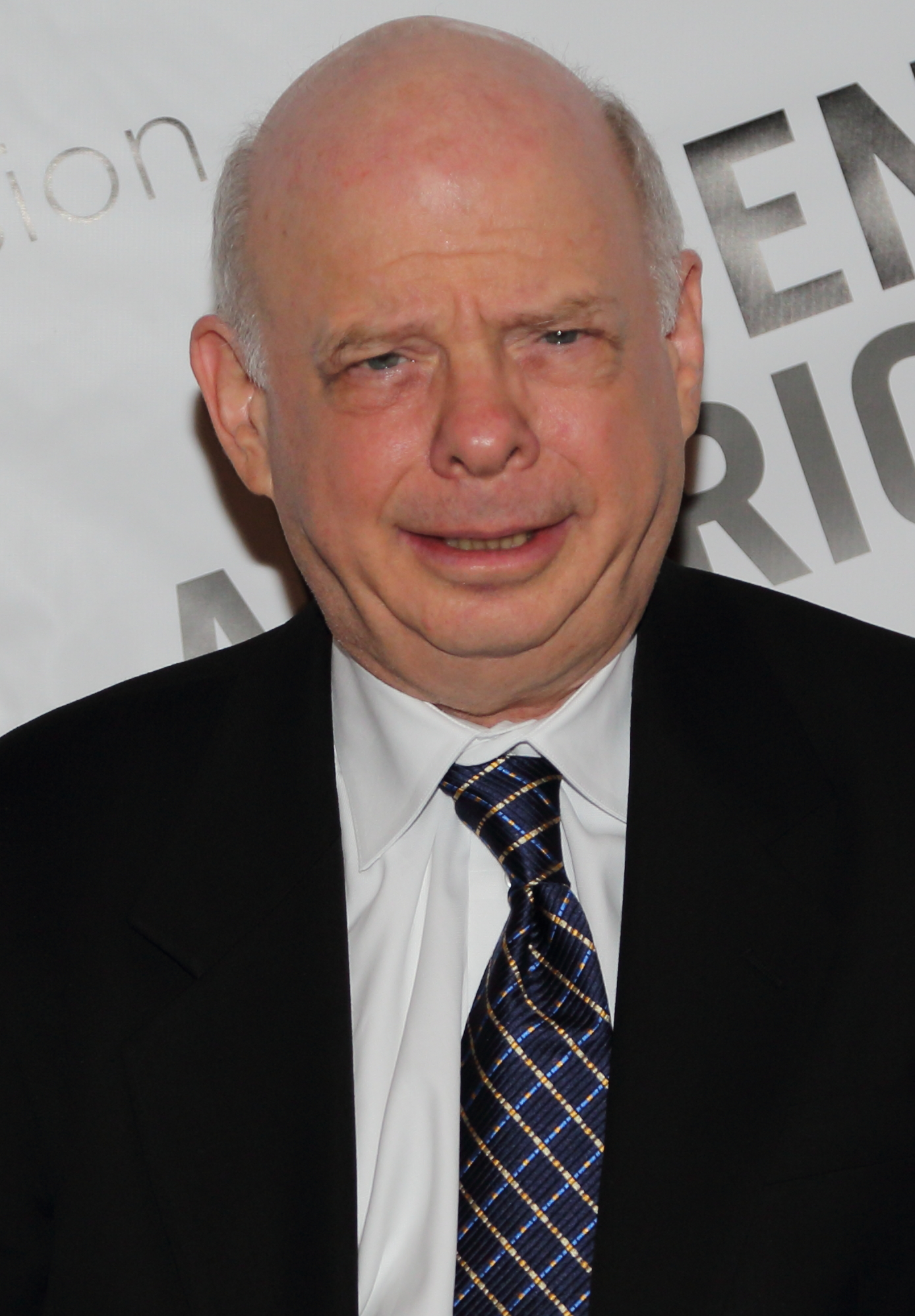
Shawn in 2014

His rare non-comedic film roles include two collaborations with Andre Gregory and Louis Malle: the semi-autobiographical dialogue My Dinner with Andre, and a combined production-and-backstage-drama of Uncle Vanya titled Vanya on 42nd Street. Shawn quite often appears on television, where he has appeared in many genres and series. He has had recurring roles as the Grand Nagus Zek on Star Trek: Deep Space Nine, Stuart Best on Murphy Brown, Jeff Engels on The Cosby Show, Dr. Howard Stiles on Crossing Jordan, Arnie Ross on Taxi, Charles Lester on both The Good Wife and The Good Fight, a reprisal of his role as Mr. Hall on Clueless (based on the film), and Father Frank Ignatius on Evil. He appeared in the 1985 music video for Chaka Khan's "This Is My Night". On February 4, 2010, Shawn appeared as Alan Rubin on The Daily Show with Jon Stewart. A Master Builder opened in New York City in June 2014. In 2018, he joined the cast of Young Sheldon in the recurring role of Meemaw's boyfriend and Sheldon's physics professor, Dr. John Sturgis.

Shawn starred in Woody Allen's 2020 film Rifkin's Festival, set in San Sebastián, Spain.

Shawn was honored in 2005 with the PEN/Laura Pels International Foundation for Theater Award as a Master American Dramatist.

==== Voice acting ====
Shawn is a voice actor for animated films and television series, including the Toy Story franchise, Monsters, Inc. (during the outtakes in the closing credits), Kingdom Hearts III, The Incredibles, A Goofy Movie, Family Guy, Happily N'Ever After, Tom and Jerry: Shiver Me Whiskers, Regular Show, BoJack Horseman and Animal Crackers.

Shawn said that Toy Story director John Lasseter might have seen both My Dinner with Andre and The Princess Bride and seen him as "excitable" like Shawn's character, Rex.

During production of The Fox and the Hound, Shawn was originally cast as Boomer, but dropped out and was replaced by Paul Winchell. In Cats & Dogs: The Revenge of Kitty Galore, he replaced Jon Lovitz as the voice of Calico. He also voiced Mr. Mustela in The Addams Family 2.

== Political activity ==
Shawn has written many plays with socialist themes; much of his work examines the "connective tissue between private psychology and the politics of inequality". He identifies as a socialist in the 2011 essay "Why I Call Myself a Socialist: Is the World Really a Stage?", which was published online and later in his Essays.

In June 2013, Shawn and many other public figures appeared in a video showing support for Chelsea Manning, a U.S. Army soldier imprisoned for leaking classified material.

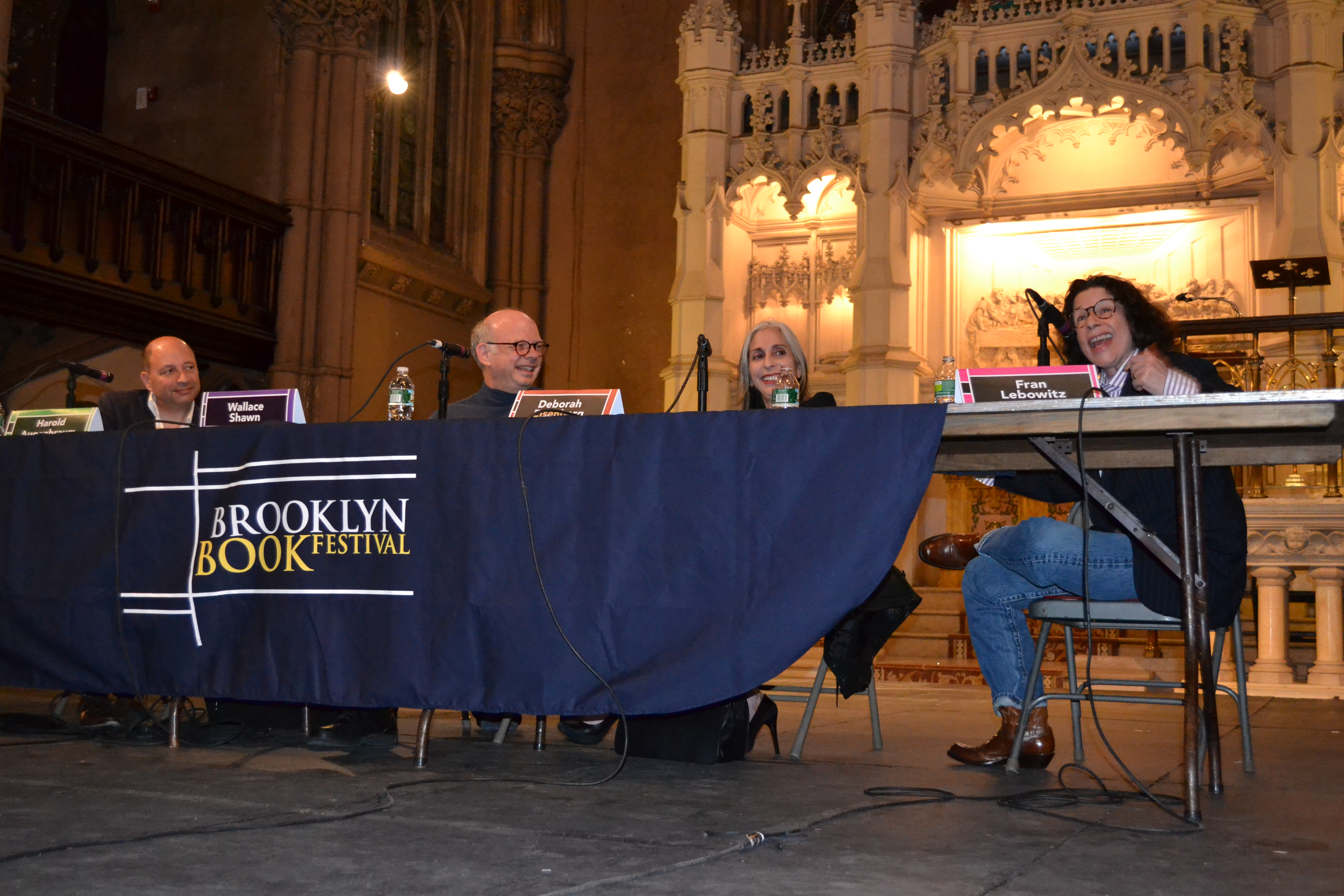
Shawn (center, left) at the Brooklyn Book Festival in 2014

Shawn voiced his support for the Palestinian people during the 2014 Gaza War. He has been on the advisory board of Jewish Voice for Peace.

On October 16, 2023, Shawn spoke at a Washington, D.C., rally organized by Jewish Voice for Peace and IfNotNow. The rally called for a ceasefire in the Gaza war and for President Joe Biden to support a ceasefire. Also that month, Shawn was among the artists to sign the Artists4Ceasefire campaign's open letter urging Biden to push for a ceasefire.

In April 2024, Shawn narrated a political ad by a coalition of organizations opposing the influence of American Israel Public Affairs Committee (AIPAC) in Democratic Party primaries.

In a January 2025 interview on the Katie Halper Show, Shawn compared Israel and its genocide in Gaza to Nazi Germany, saying the Israelis "are doing evil that is just as great as what the Nazis did. And in some ways, it's worse, because they kind of boast about it. Hitler had the decency to try to keep it secret [...] the Israelis are almost proud of it, and it's demonically evil."

== Personal life ==
Shawn is a Jewish atheist. His longtime partner is writer Deborah Eisenberg. As of 2012, he lived in the Chelsea neighborhood of Manhattan.

== Accolades ==
Year	Association	Category	Nominated work	Result
1978	Guggenheim Fellowship	Drama & Performance Art	—N/a	—N/a
1982	Boston Society of Film Critics Awards	Best Screenplay	My Dinner with Andre	Won
1994	Boston Society of Film Critics Awards	Best Actor	Vanya on 42nd Street	Nominated
1995	Chlotrudis Awards	Best Actor	Vanya on 42nd Street	Won

== Written works ==
Year	Title	Notes
2009	Essays	Book collection of essays, by Haymarket Books
2017	Night Thoughts	Published by Haymarket Books
2022	Sleeping Among Sheep Under a Starry Sky	Book compilation of essays, published by Europa Editions

== See also ==
- List of Jewish atheists and agnostics
