= Aunt Dan and Lemon =

Play written by Wallace Shawn

- Original language: English
- Written by: Wallace Shawn
- Characters: Aunt Danielle "Dan"; Lenora "Lemon"
- Setting: Apartment

Premiere
- Date: August 27, 1985
- Place: Royal Court Theatre

Kristen Johnston and Lili Taylor in the 2004 off-Broadway revival

Aunt Dan and Lemon is stage play written by American playwright Wallace Shawn.

== Plot synopsis ==
Lemon, a reclusive young woman with an unspecified chronic illness, sits in her apartment reading books about Nazism and reliving her life story. But as she tells the audience, that life story consists mostly of stories she herself was told in childhood by "Aunt Dan", a family friend. In flashback we see the miserable marriage of Lemon's parents and the child's eagerness for escape through Dan's stories.

Dan is a charismatic, eccentric figure, who tells the girl of her love affairs with women but also of an intense imaginary romance with Henry Kissinger. Dan's worldview is an application of Kissinger's doctrine of realpolitik to private life—amoral, ruthless, and seeing all relationships in terms of dominance and submission. As the play continues, Dan's stories become more bizarre, including one in which she conspires with a gangster's moll to murder a policeman. Lemon's inarticulate mother tries to stand up for the value of compassion, but she fails and is made to look foolish and weak by Dan's eloquence.

Dan is transformed, however, when she becomes ill some years later. Tended lovingly by a nurse, she comes to feel for the first time a sense of loving connection with the world. Lemon is bewildered and alienated by this change in her mentor, and Dan dies soon afterward.

Now an invalid herself, Lemon gains no similar insight from her illness or from her memories. Continuing her study of Nazism, she decides that compassion is simply a lie people tell to comfort themselves, and that this lie is only possible because the powerful of the world have taken on the burden of necessary violence. She concludes with the thought that ordinary people owe killers like Hitler and Kissinger a debt of gratitude for making their self-deceit possible.

== Original cast and characters ==
Character	Off-Broadway	Royal Court	Steppenwolf	Washington D.C.	Off-Broadway	Royal Court
Character	1985	1985	1987	1988	2004	2009
Aunt Dan	Linda Hunt	Linda Hunt	Molly Regan	Nancy Robinette	Kristen Johnston	Lorraine Ashbourne
Lemon	Kathryn Pogson	Kathryn Pogson	Martha Lavey	Jennifer Mendenhall	Lili Taylor	Jane Horrocks

== Production history ==
The world premiere was produced by the New York Shakespeare Festival (Joseph Papp, producer) at the Royal Court Theatre in London, England on August 27, 1985, under the direction of Max Stafford-Clark. This production opened off-Broadway at The Public Theater on October 21, 1985. Kathryn Pogson was awarded an Obie Award for Distinguished Performance by an Actress for her performance.

The Chicago premiere took place at Steppenwolf Theatre Company in 1987, directed by Frank Galati. Molly Regan and Martha Lavey were both nominated for Jeff Awards for their performances.

The first production in Washington, D.C. took place at the Woolly Mammoth Theatre Company in 1988, directed by Howard Shalwitz. Jennifer Mendenhall won a Helen Hayes Award for her performance as Lemon.

It received a New York revival off-Broadway in 2004 at the Acorn Theatre, directed by Scott Elliot. Lili Taylor was awarded an Obie Award for Distinguished Performance by an Actress for her performance.

The play returned to London’s Royal Court Theatre in 2009 when Jane Horrocks took the lead role. This production received mixed reviews.
