= The Master Builder =

Play by Henrik Ibsen

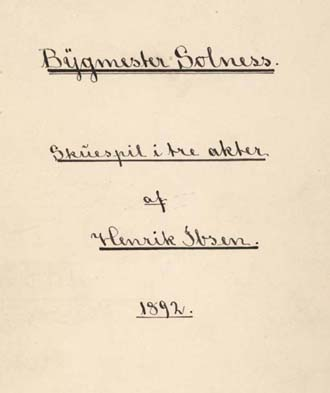
- Manuscript. The diaresis over the y in Bygmester is not a letter ÿ but a handwriting convention to avoid confusion with ij.
- Original language: Dano-Norwegian
- Written by: Henrik Ibsen
- Characters: Halvard Solness; Aline Solness; Dr. Herdal; Knut Brovik; Ragnar Brovik; Kaia Fosli; Hilda Wangel
- Genre: Naturalism; Tragedy
- Setting: The Solness house, Norway

Premiere
- Date: 19 January 1893
- Place: Lessing Theatre

The Master Builder (Norwegian: Bygmester Solness, 'Solness the master-builder') is a play by Norwegian playwright Henrik Ibsen. It was first published in December 1892 and is regarded as one of Ibsen's more significant and revealing works.

== Performance ==
The play was published by Gyldendal AS in Copenhagen in 1892 and its first performance was on 19 January 1893 at the Lessing Theatre in Berlin, with Emanuel Reicher as Solness. It opened at the Trafalgar Theatre in London the following month, with Herbert H. Waring in the name part and Elizabeth Robins as Hilda. The English translation was by the theatre critic William Archer and poet Edmund Gosse. Productions in Oslo and Copenhagen were coordinated to open on 8 March 1893. In the following year, the work was staged by Théâtre de l'Œuvre, the international company based in Paris. The first U.S. performance was at the Carnegie Lyceum in New York on 16 January 1900, with William Pascoe and Florence Kahn.

== Characters ==
- Halvard Solness, master builder
- Aline Solness, his wife
- Dr. Herdal, physician
- Knut Brovik, formerly an architect, now in Solness's employment
- Ragnar Brovik, Knut Brovik's son, a draftsman
- Kaia Fosli, a female book-keeper
- Hilda Wangel, a young woman who was introduced in Ibsen's The Lady from the Sea

== Synopsis ==
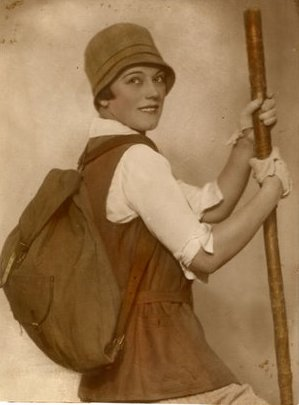
Gizi Bajor as Hilda in a 1924 Hungarian production

Halvard Solness is a middle-aged master builder of a small town in Norway who has become a successful architect of some distinction — a lack of formal training prevents him from calling himself an "architect" — and a local reputation. One day while at home talking with his friend Doctor Herdal, Solness is visited by Hilda Wangel, a young woman of 23, whom Doctor Herdal recognizes from a recent trip that he had taken. The doctor leaves; Solness is alone with Hilda, and she reminds him that they are not strangers — they have previously met in her home town 10 years ago when she was 13 years old. When Solness does not respond immediately, she reminds him that at one point during their encounter he had made advances to her, had offered her a romantic interlude, and promised her "a kingdom", all of which she believed. He denies this. She gradually convinces him, however, that she can assist him with his household duties, and so he takes her into his home.

Solness is also the manager of an architectural office in which he employs Knut Brovik, his son Ragnar Brovik, and Kaia Fosli. Kaia and Ragnar are romantically linked, and Ragnar has ambitions to become promoted in his architectural vocation, which Solness is reluctant to grant or support. Solness also has a complicated relationship with his wife Aline, and the two are revealed to have lost twin sons some years ago. During this time, Solness builds a closer tie with Hilda while she is in his home, and she supports his architectural vocation and new projects.

During the construction of his most recent project — a new home for himself and Aline — which includes a towering steeple, Hilda learns that Solness suffers from acrophobia, a morbid fear of extreme heights, but nonetheless she encourages him to climb the steeple to the top at the public opening of the newly completed building. Solness, inspired by her words, achieves the top of the tower, when he suddenly loses his footing and crashes to his death on the ground before the spectators who have arrived for the opening of the new building. Among the spectators standing aghast at the sight, only Hilda comes forward as if in silent triumph. She waves her shawl and cries out with wild intensity, “My—my Master Builder!”

== Interpretation ==
The search for a meaning or interpretation has engaged and often bewildered audiences and critics all over the world. It is seen as an exploration of the author’s autobiographical history, or of issues dealing with youth versus maturity, or of issues of psychology, and other possible interpretations.

Halvard Solness, the master builder, has become the most successful builder in his home town by a fortunate series of coincidences for him which were the chance misfortunes of his competitors. He had previously conceived these fortunate coincidences in his mind, powerfully wished for them to come to pass, but never actually did anything about them. By the time his wife's ancestral home was destroyed by a fire in a clothes cupboard, he had imagined how he could cause such an accident and then profit from it by dividing the land on which the house stood into plots and covering it with homes for sale. Between this fortuitous occurrence and some chance misfortunes of his competitors, Solness comes to believe that he only has to wish for something to happen in order for it to come about. He rationalises this as a particular gift from God, bestowed so that, through his unnatural success, he can carry out God's ordained work of church building.

== Realism fused with symbolism ==
This play contains realistic and symbolic elements fused together. It represents a movement from his earlier realistic plays, such as A Doll's House, into a more symbolic style. It begins with realistic characters being presented, and then as the story progresses, it shifts into the inner world of the mind of the leading character.

The setting and plot of The Master Builder can be taken as one of realism: the destructive outcome of a middle-aged, professional man's infatuation with a younger, teasing woman or, as critic Desmond MacCarthy describes this concept of the work: the tragedy of an "elderly architect who falls off his scaffold while trying to show off before a young lady". If, however, one takes Solness's belief in his powers at their face value, the play also can be a lyrical and poetic fairy tale, in the manner of Peer Gynt travelling the Earth in his magical adventures while the faithful Solveig waits for his return. On stage, both interpretations are possible, but it is difficult to give equal weight to both meanings in the same production.

== Autobiographical elements ==
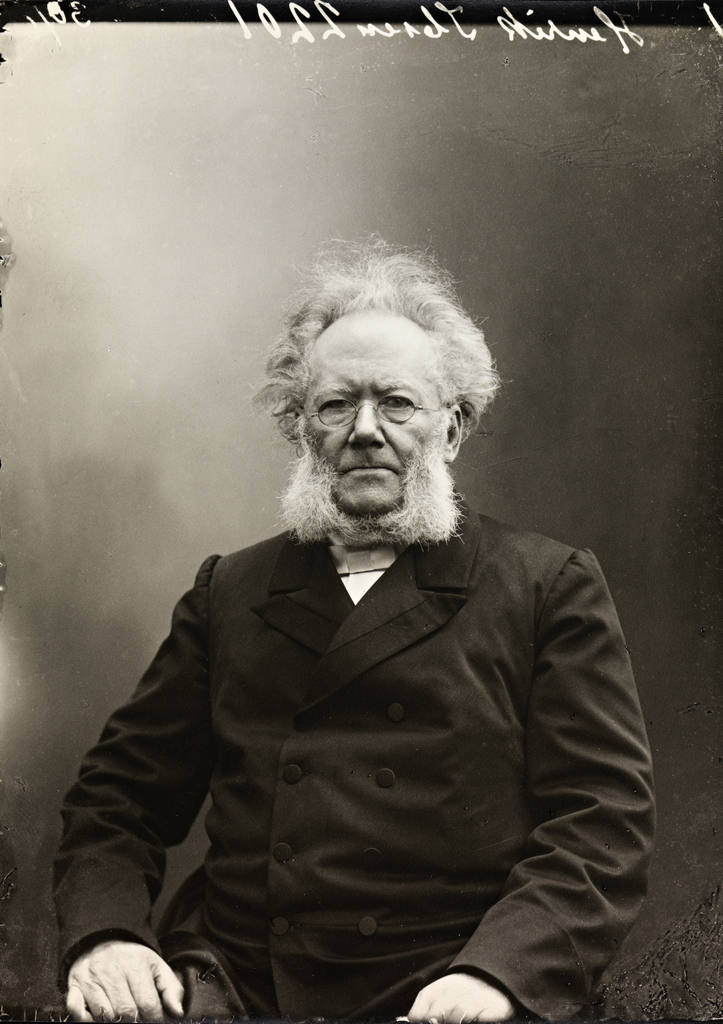
Ibsen in 1894

At the time Ibsen was working on The Master Builder, he was taking a holiday in the mountain resort of Gossensass and spending much time with Emilie Bardach, an 18-year-old Viennese student with whom he found a temporary, "high, painful happiness" in a brief affair. The real-life prototype of Hilda made no secret of her delight at stealing husbands. "She did not get a hold of me", Ibsen was later to claim, "but I got hold of her — for my play". Theatre director Harold Clurman notes that many interpreters of Ibsen's text have associated his frequent references in the play to Hilda as a "bird of prey" with Bardach's predatory behaviour. After leaving Gossensass, Ibsen carried on a correspondence with Bardach, but he continued to see Helene Raff, an acquaintance of Bardach whom he had also met that summer. It was Raff who told Ibsen the story of the architect of St. Michael's Church, Munich, who had cast himself from the tower as soon as it was finished. Ibsen took this tale, a common legend at many German churches, as evidence of a pervasive human belief that a man could not achieve success without paying a price. From Ibsen's inscription in the copy of the play he sent to Raff (he sent no copy to Bardach), she too can be regarded as an inspiration for the unequal affair between Hilda and Solness. An equally obvious influence is Ibsen's relationship with Hildur Andersen, whom he met as the 10-year-old child of friends and who, when she had reached the age of 27, became his constant companion. He wrote of Hildur as "his bird of the woods", the phrase he initially uses to describe his character Hilda, but the character refuses this, accepting only that she is a "bird of prey", as was Bardach. The character of Hilda is a blend of all three women, but Hildur Andersen was the most significant.

The autobiographical elements Ibsen includes go further than his relationships with Bardach, Raff and Andersen: In the character of Solness, Ibsen is drawing parallels with his own situation as the "master playwright" and the consequences in his own life. That Ibsen was offering a parable was noted in a review of the first London staging, when the joint translator, Edmund Gosse, was asked to explain the meaning of the work. "An allegory of Dr Ibsen's literary career", he replied.

== Reception ==
Following the controversy attached to Ghosts, with its sensitive topic of inherited syphilis, the play's reception in London was not favourable. The more charitable reviews took Solness at his own assessment, as a madman, and decided the other two protagonists were mad as well. Some transferred the conclusion to Ibsen, his translators and his director. Even The Pall Mall Gazette, a champion of Ibsen's work, offered sympathy to the "daring" actors whose mediocre talents were unable to relieve the tedium of this lapse on the part of the "northern genius". The Daily Graphic, however, found the performances of Waring and Robins the "redeeming feature" of the production. At the end of the run at the Trafalgar Theatre, the two principals engaged a new supporting cast and secured a transfer to the nearby Vaudeville Theatre but, again, reviews were hostile.

== Criticism ==
The Master Builder was the first work Ibsen wrote upon his return to Norway in July 1891 after many years spent elsewhere in Europe. It is usually grouped with Ibsen's other works written during this late period of Ibsen's life such as Little Eyolf, John Gabriel Borkman, When We Dead Awaken, and Hedda Gabler. Early reactions to the play by Ibsen's critics were mixed, possibly due its heightened ambiguities. Hilda, for example, seems to alternate roles between an inspiring force, urging Solness to temper his rampant ambition and so find real happiness, and a temptress, pushing Solness to commitments he cannot possibly fulfill. English critic William Archer (the play's original translator) suggests that the play is not as completely symbolic as some have maintained, interpreting it instead as "a history of a sickly conscience, worked out in terms of pure psychology". He notes that, in this regard, the play is similar to earlier works that deal mainly with a retrospective look at a character's psyche.

== Translations ==
The authoritative translation in the English language for Ibsen remains the 1928 10-volume version of the Complete Works of Henrik Ibsen from Oxford University Press. Many other translations of individual plays by Ibsen have appeared since 1928 though none have purported to be a new version of the complete works of Ibsen.

== Adaptations ==
In 1958, the BBC produced an adaptation with Donald Wolfit as the master builder.

The play was performed in 1960 starring E.G. Marshall as Halvard Solness, the master builder, on the American television anthology series The Play of the Week; David Susskind was the producer.

In 1988, BBC produced another adaptation with Leo McKern as the master builder and Miranda Richardson as Hilda.

The 2008 Malayalam-language film Aakasha Gopuram directed by K.P. Kumaran is an adaptation of the play starring Mohanlal as the master builder and Nithya Menen as his wife.

The 2013 film A Master Builder was directed by Jonathan Demme. It stars Wallace Shawn, who had translated and adapted it for the stage in collaboration with Andre Gregory. This stage adaptation was the basis for the film.

The German director Michael Klette adapted this story for his movie Solness (2015).

A two-part adaptation for radio by David Hare from a literal translation by Torkil Heggstad directed by Gary Brown was broadcast on 15 and 22 August 2021 on BBC Radio 4, with David Schofield as Solness, Siobhan Redmond as Aline and Laura Aikman as Hilda.

The story inspired a play by Lila Raicek, My Master Builder, which premiered in 2025, and starred Ewan McGregor, Kate Fleetwood, and Elizabeth Debicki.
