= Todd London (professor) =

American theatre scholar

Todd London is the Head of the MFA Playwriting Program at the New School School of Drama and the Director of Theatre Relations for the Dramatists Guild of America.

== Career ==
London holds an MFA in Directing from Boston University and a PhD in Literary Studies from American University. He served as Artistic Director of New Dramatists in New York for 18 seasons, and Executive Director of the University of Washington School of Drama for four years. He is also a writer and theatre historian. He has authored, co-authored, or edited more than fifteen books.

Todd London is a frequent speaker at artistic conferences and gatherings throughout the world. He has taught at the New School School of Drama (2018 - present) University of Washington (2014 – 2018), Yale School of Drama (2006-2014), Harvard University (1995), and New York University’s Tisch School of the Arts (1990–1994).

London founded The Third Bohemia in 2011, which support independent theatre artists to share their thoughts and work with people from different fields. He is past Literary Director of the American Repertory Theatre at Harvard University, and Associate Artistic Director of the Classic Stage Company (a classic Off-Broadway theater) and New Playwrights Theatre in Washington, D.C.

== Awards and recognition ==
He won the 2009 Visionary Leadership Award from the Theatre Communications Group, where he was described as “an individual who has gone above and beyond the call of duty to advance the theatre field as a whole, nationally and/or internationally.” His writing has earned him the George Jean Nathan Award for Dramatic Criticism and a Milestone Award. Under his leadership, New Dramatists, an organization of playwrights in New York City, received Tony Honor and the Ross Wetzsteon Award for Excellences. In 2014, he was awarded the Miss Lilly Award from The Lillys.

== Selected publications ==
- If You See Him, Let Me Know - author. Published by Austin Macauley (February 28, 2020)
- 15 Actors, 20 Years – author. Published by Dutch Kills Press
- An Ideal Theater: Founding Visions for a New American Art - author. Published by Theatre Communications Group
- Contemporary American Monologues for Women - author. Published by Theatre Communications Group
- The Artistic Home: Discussions with Artistic Directors of America's Institutional Theatres - author. Published by Theatre Communications Group
- Outrageous Fortune: The Life and Times of the New American Play - author alongside Ben Pesner and Zannie Giraud Voss. Published by Theatre Development Fund
