= Café des Artistes =

Restaurant in Manhattan, New York

Coordinates: 40°46′24″N 73°58′43.9″W

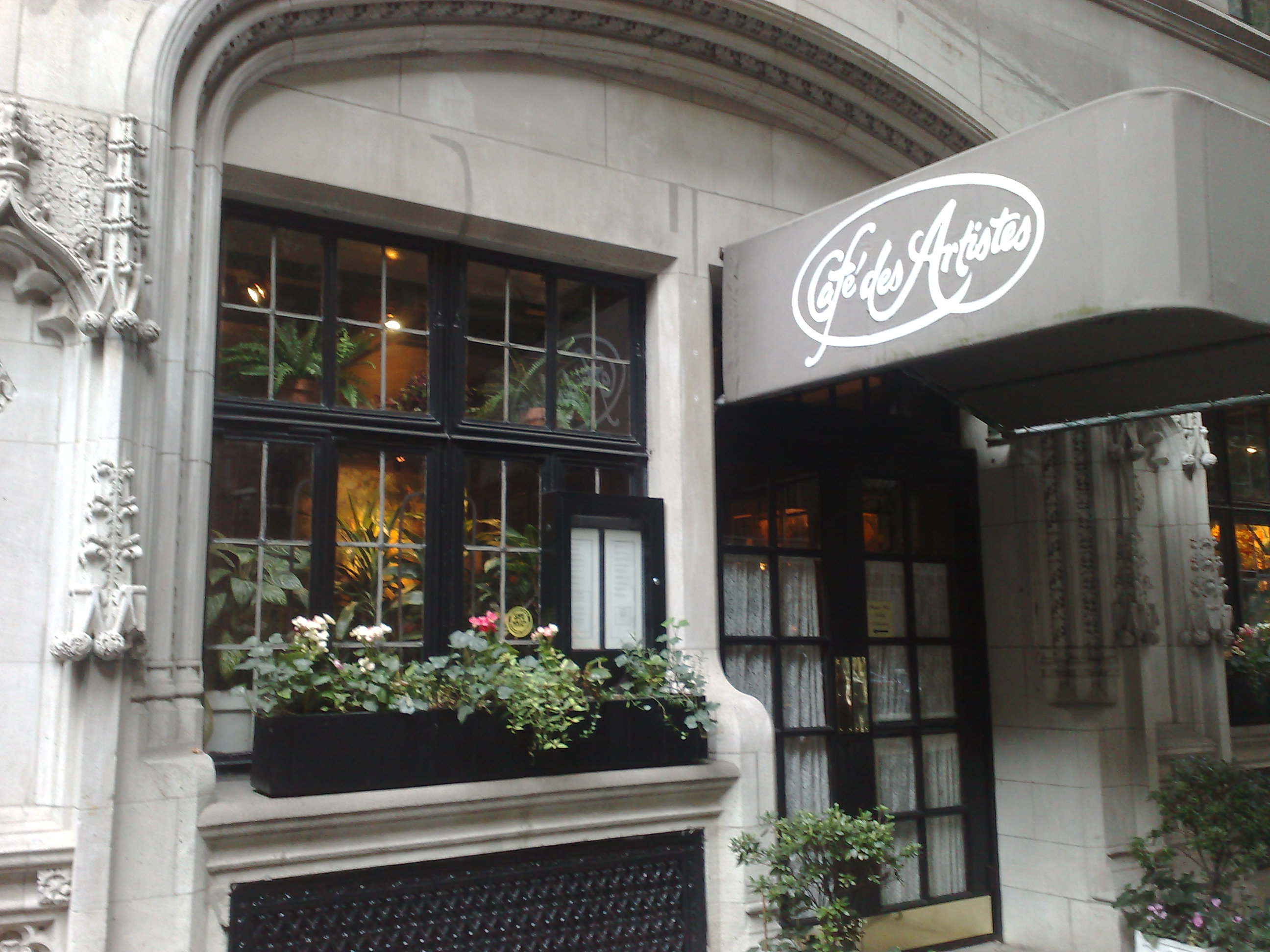
- Front entrance to Café des Artistes in October 2008
- Interactive map of Café des Artistes

Restaurant information
- Established: 1917
- Closed: 2009
- Food type: French
- Location: 1 West 67 Street, New York, New York, 10023

Café des Artistes was a fine restaurant at 1 West 67th Street in Manhattan. New York City. Its final owner was George Lang, who closed the restaurant in early August 2009.

== History ==
The restaurant first opened in 1917, at street level of the Hotel des Artistes tower. Café des Artistes was designed for the residents of the Hotel des Artistes, since the apartments lacked kitchens. Late in 1985, there was a fire in the kitchen, but the restaurant was able to reopen.

In early September 2009, two years into the Great Recession, Lang announced that the café was closing; shortly thereafter, Lang filed for Chapter 7 bankruptcy protection, claiming debts of nearly $500,000, some of which was owed to a union benefit trust. At the time, he also faced a lawsuit from the Hotel Employees and Restaurant Employees Union Welfare Fund.

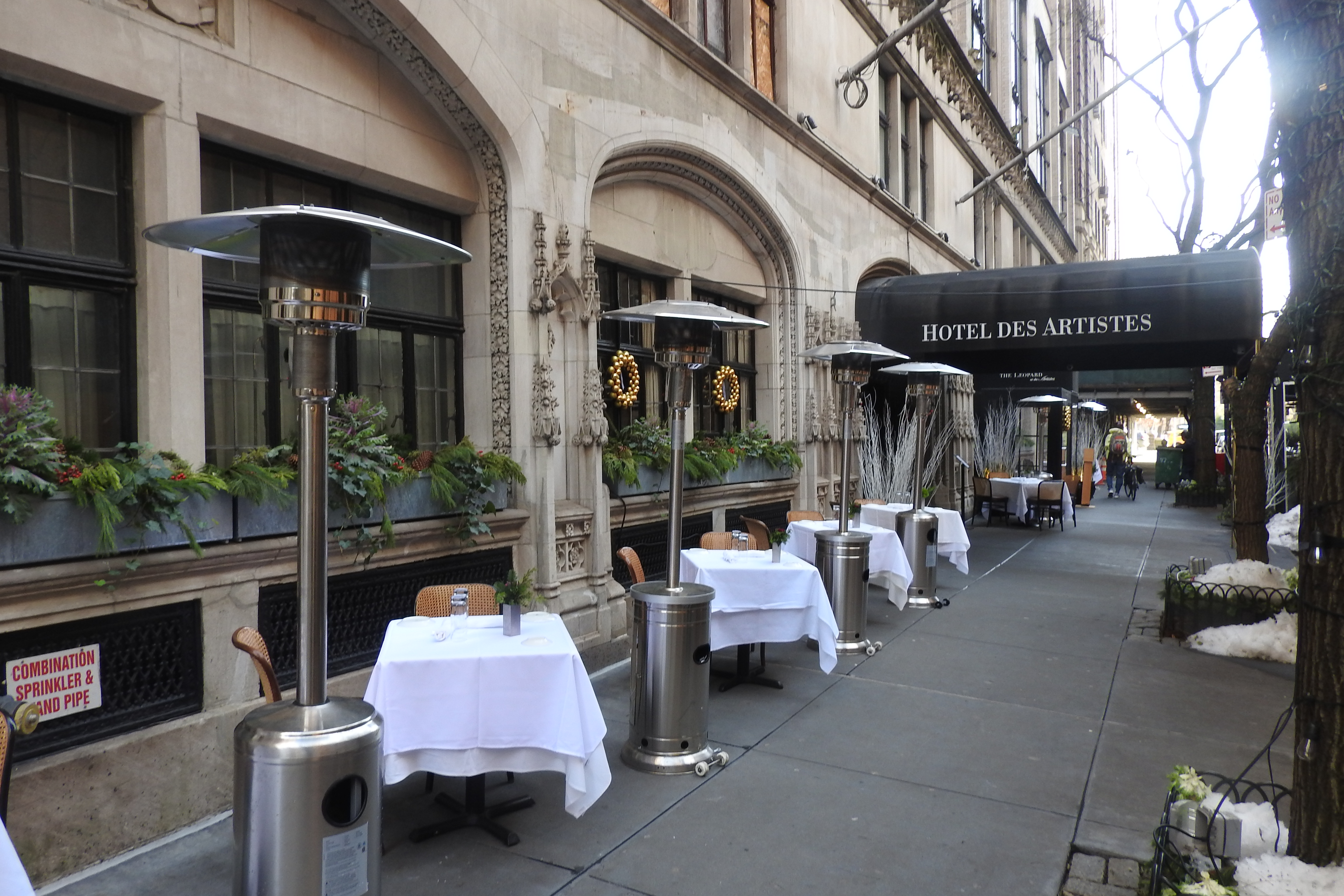
Ready for outdoor dining

In 2011, a new restaurant, the Leopard at des Artistes, opened in the location. According to the New York Times, it caters to those in New York society who derive "fame from power rather than the other way around". Leopard at des Artistes closed in February 2026.

== Murals ==
The restaurant's famous murals, retained in the new restaurant's 2011 renovation, were painted by Howard Chandler Christy. Christy was a tenant of the building, Hotel des Artistes, until his death in 1952. There are six panels of wood nymphs, the first of which were completed in 1934. Other Christy works on display include paintings such as The Parrot Girl, The Swing Girl, Ponce De Leon, Fall, Spring, and the Fountain of Youth.

== In popular culture ==
- 1981: It is the setting for the film My Dinner with Andre. Actual filming took place in the then-unoccupied Jefferson Hotel in Richmond, Virginia.
- 1997: In the chapter 15 of the book Reliquary by Douglas Preston and Lincoln Child, the character Smithback invites Margot at the cafe of the Hotel des Artistes where they discuss about a confidential police investigation.
