= Deborah Eisenberg =

American short story writer

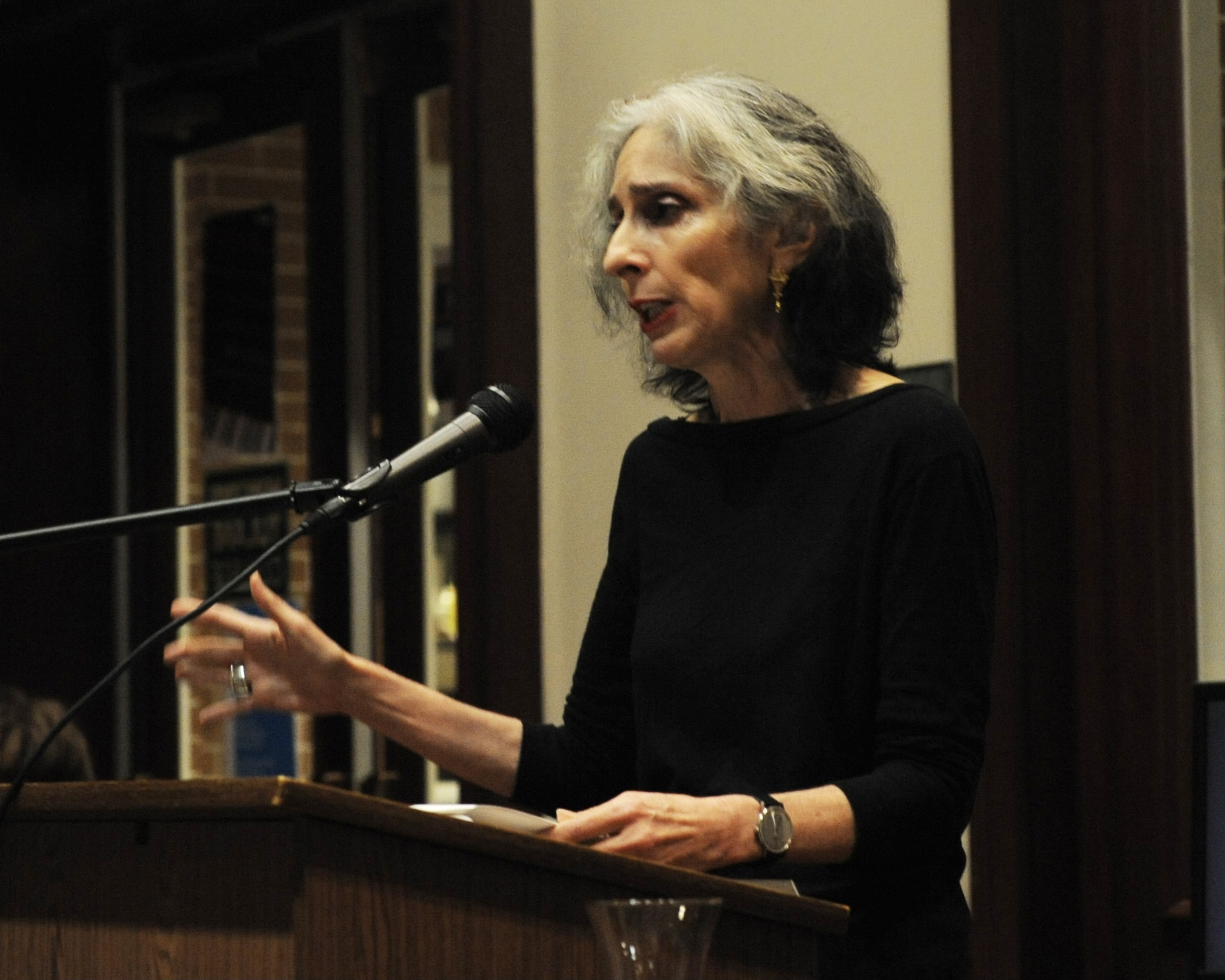
- Eisenberg in 2009
- Born: November 20, 1945 (age 80); Winnetka, Illinois, U.S.
- Education: Marlboro College; The New School
- Occupations: Writer; professor
- Partner: Wallace Shawn (1972–present)
- Writing career
- Notable awards: 1987 Whiting Award; 1987–88 Guggenheim Fellowship; 2000 Rea Award for the Short Story; 2003 Lannan Literary Fellowship; 2009 MacArthur Fellowship; 2011 PEN/Faulkner Award for Fiction; O. Henry Awards, 1986, 1995, 1997, 2002, 2006, 2013

Deborah Eisenberg (born November 20, 1945) is an American short story writer, actress and teacher. She was a professor of writing at Columbia University.

== Early life ==
Eisenberg was born in Winnetka, Illinois. Her family is Jewish. She grew up in suburban Chicago, Illinois, and moved to New York City in the late 1960s.

Of her family origins, Eisenberg told The Paris Review:

Those of us who are the grandchildren of immigrants often have a void in our psyche that reflects a situation of danger or terror that our grandparents endured. The first generation born in the United States often tries to erase or suppress what they know of their parents' experience in order to provide a level playing field for their children, but in fact experience and fears can be transmitted in various forms across many generations. Many of us grew up knowing nothing, or next to nothing, about the horrors our grandparents lived through, and when we search for the source of certain anxieties, all we can locate is a kind of blank inscrutability.

== Career ==
Eisenberg was an editorial assistant at The New York Review of Books in 1973. She taught at the University of Virginia from 1994 until 2011, when she accepted a teaching position at Columbia University's MFA writing program.

=== Writing ===
Eisenberg published her first story, "Flotsam", when she was nearly 40. Since then, she has published five collections of stories: Transactions in a Foreign Currency (1986), Under the 82nd Airborne (1992), All Around Atlantis (1997), Twilight of the Superheroes (2006), and Your Duck Is My Duck (2018). Reviewing Twilight of the Superheroes for The New York Times Book Review, Ben Marcus called Eisenberg "one of the most important fiction writers now at work. This work is great." Reviewing the same collection in The New York Times, Michiko Kakutani wrote that Eisenberg has a "playwright's ear for dialogue and a journalistic eye for the askew detail". Eisenberg's first two story collections were republished in one volume as The Work (So Far) of Deborah Eisenberg (1997). Her first four collections were reprinted in The Collected Stories of Deborah Eisenberg (2010).

Eisenberg's later books include Your Duck Is My Duck (2018), a story collection that continues her exploration of contemporary relationships and moral complexity.

Eisenberg has also written a play, Pastorale, which was produced at Second Stage in New York City in 1982. She has written for such magazines as The New York Review of Books, The New Yorker, and The Yale Review. She is the credited screenwriter of the 2020 Steven Soderbergh film Let Them All Talk, for which she wrote a 50-page treatment from which the actors largely improvised the dialogue.

In 2026, Eisenberg and her partner, Wallace Shawn, stepped in on short notice to substitute for sick cast members in the off-Broadway production of Shawn's play What We Did Before Our Moth Days.

=== Awards ===
Eisenberg received the Rea Award for the Short Story in 2000, an award granted for significant contribution to the short story form. She has also received a Whiting Award and a Guggenheim Fellowship, both in 1987; and six O. Henry Awards, in 1986, 1995, 1997, 2002, 2006, and 2013.

In 2007, Eisenberg was elected into the American Academy of Arts and Letters, and in 2009 she was awarded a MacArthur Fellowship. She won the 2011 PEN/Faulkner Award for Fiction for The Collected Stories of Deborah Eisenberg.

Eisenberg received the PEN/Malamud Award for Excellence in the Short Story in May 2015.

Your Duck Is My Duck was one of three finalists for The Story Prize for the year 2018.

=== Criticism of PEN award ===
In April 2015, in an exchange with PEN America's Executive Director Suzanne Nossel published in The Intercept by Glenn Greenwald, Eisenberg criticized PEN's decision to give its annual Freedom of Expression Courage Award to Charlie Hebdo, calling the choice "an opportunistic exploitation of the horrible murders in Paris to justify and glorify offensive material expressing Islamophobic and nationalistic sentiments already widely shared in the Western world." Joining Eisenberg in her protest of PEN's award ceremony were Peter Carey, Francine Prose, Teju Cole, Rachel Kushner and Taiye Selasi. In addition, 145 writers—including Junot Díaz, Lorrie Moore, Joyce Carol Oates, and Michael Cunningham—signed a letter protesting PEN's decision.

== Personal life ==
Eisenberg lives in the Chelsea neighborhood of New York City.

Her longtime companion is actor-writer Wallace Shawn. She was frequently referred to as "Debbie" in the film My Dinner with Andre, in which she also appears as a dining patron in the restaurant near the beginning.

== Bibliography ==
=== Short fiction ===
Collections

- Transactions in a foreign currency. Knopf. 1986.
- Under the 82nd Airborne. Faber. 1992. ISBN 978-0-571-16439-4.
- The stories (so far) of Deborah Eisenberg. Noonday Press. 1997. ISBN 978-0-374-52492-0.
- All around Atlantis. Simon & Schuster. 1998.
- Twilight of the superheroes. Picador. 2006. ISBN 978-0-330-44460-6.
- The collected stories of Deborah Eisenberg. Picador. 2010. ISBN 978-0-312-42989-8.
- Your duck is my duck. Ecco. 2018. ISBN 978-0-062-68877-4.

Stories

Title	Publication	Collected in
"Flotsam"	The New Yorker (September 3, 1984)	Transactions in a foreign currency
"Transactions in a foreign currency"	Eisenberg, Deborah (January 21, 1985). "Transactions in a foreign currency". The New Yorker. 60 (49): 28–44.	Transactions in a foreign currency
"What It Was Like, Seeing Chris"	The New Yorker (July 29, 1985)	Transactions in a foreign currency
"A Lesson in Traveling Light"	Vanity Fair (July 1985)	Transactions in a foreign currency
"Broken Glass"	The New Yorker (December 2, 1985)	Transactions in a foreign currency
"Rafe's Coat"	Transactions in a Foreign Currency (1986)	Transactions in a foreign currency
"Days"	Transactions in a Foreign Currency (1986)	Transactions in a foreign currency
"A Cautionary Tale"	The New Yorker (March 23, 1987)	Under the 82nd Airborne
"Presents"	The New Yorker (July 20, 1987)	Under the 82nd Airborne
"Under the 82nd Airborne"	The New Yorker (February 13, 1989)	Under the 82nd Airborne
"The Robbery"	Bomb 29 (Fall 1989)	Under the 82nd Airborne
"The Custodian"	The New Yorker (March 12, 1990)	Under the 82nd Airborne
"In the Station"	Bomb 36 (Summer 1991)	Under the 82nd Airborne
"Holy Week"	Western Humanities Review #45.3 (Autumn 1991)	Under the 82nd Airborne
"Tlaloc's paradise"	Voice Literary Supplement (May 1992)	All around Atlantis
"Someone to talk to"	The New Yorker (September 27, 1993)	All around Atlantis
"Across the lake"	Voice Literary Supplement (November 1993)	All around Atlantis
"The girl who left her sock on the floor"	The New Yorker (December 5, 1994)	All around Atlantis
"Mermaids"	The Yale Review (July 1996)	All around Atlantis
"Rosie gets a soul"	All around Atlantis (1997)	All around Atlantis
"All around Atlantis"	All around Atlantis (1997)	All around Atlantis
"Like It or Not"	The Threepenny Review #85 (Spring 2001)	Twilight of the Superheroes
"Some Other, Better Otto"	The Yale Review (January 2003)	Twilight of the Superheroes
"Revenge of the Dinosaurs"	Tin House #17 (Fall 2003)	Twilight of the Superheroes
"Window"	Tin House #19 (Spring 2004)	Twilight of the Superheroes
"Twilight of the Superheroes"	Final Edition (Autumn 2004)	Twilight of the Superheroes
"The Flaw in the Design"	Virginia Quarterly Review #82.1 (Winter 2006)	Twilight of the Superheroes
"Recalculating"	The New York Review of Books (July 14, 2011)	Your Duck Is My Duck
"Your Duck Is My Duck"	Fence (Fall 2011)	Your Duck Is My Duck
"Cross Off and Move On"	The New York Review of Books (July 12, 2012)	Your Duck Is My Duck
"Taj Mahal"	The Paris Review #214 (Fall 2015)	Your Duck Is My Duck
"The third tower"	* Ploughshares (Spring 2018) * Eisenberg, Deborah (2019). "The third tower". In Anthony Doerr (ed.). The best American short stories 2019. Boston: Mariner Books.	Your Duck Is My Duck
"Merge"	Virginia Quarterly Review 94.3 (Fall 2018)	Your Duck Is My Duck

Anthologies

- William Miller Abrahams, ed. (1995). Prize Stories 1995: The O. Henry Awards. Doubleday. ISBN 978-0-385-47672-0.
- Richard Ford, ed. (2007). The New Granta Book of the American Short Story. Granta Books. ISBN 978-1-86207-847-5.
- Laura Furman, ed. (2006). The O. Henry Prize Stories 2008. Anchor Books. ISBN 978-1-4000-9539-1.

=== Plays ===
- Pastorale. Samuel French, Inc. 1983. ISBN 978-0-573-61363-0.

=== Other ===
- Ken Heyman. (1988). Hipshot: One-Handed, Auto-Focus Photographs by a Master Photographer. Foreword Eisenberg. Aperture.
- Eisenberg, Deborah (1994). Air, 24 hours : Jennifer Bartlett. Paintings by Jennifer Bartlett. H.N. Abrams.
- Michael John LaChiusa (2003). Little Fish. (Short Story Deborah Eisenberg). Dramatists Play Service, Inc. ISBN 978-0-8222-1973-6.
- Francine Prose; Mark Hussey, eds. (2004). "On Mrs. Dalloway". The Mrs. Dalloway Reader. Houghton Mifflin Harcourt. ISBN 978-0-15-603015-1.
- Green, Henry (2016). Back. Introduction by Deborah Eisenberg. New York: New York Review Books.
