= A Master Builder =

2013 film directed by Jonathan Demme

- The Criterion Collection home release cover
- Directed by: Jonathan Demme
- Screenplay by: Wallace Shawn
- Based on: The Master Builder (1892 play) by Henrik Ibsen
- Produced by: Rocco Caruso; Andre Gregory; Wallace Shawn
- Starring: Wallace Shawn; Julie Hagerty; André Gregory; Lisa Joyce; Larry Pine
- Cinematography: Declan Quinn
- Edited by: Tim Squyres
- Music by: Suzana Peric
- Production company: Westward Productions
- Distributed by: Abramorama
- Release dates: November 11, 2013 (Rome); July 23, 2014 (U.S.)
- Running time: 130 minutes
- Country: United States
- Language: English
- Box office: $46,874

A Master Builder (also released as Fear of Falling) is a 2013 American drama film directed by Jonathan Demme and produced by André Gregory, adapted from Henrik Ibsen's 1892 play The Master Builder. It is written by and stars Wallace Shawn. The film also stars Julie Hagerty, Lisa Joyce and Gregory. The film is based on a staging of Ibsen's play by Gregory and Shawn.

The film received a limited release in the United States in June 2014. It received positive reviews.

== Plot ==
Halvard Solness is an aging architect of a small town in Norway, who has managed to attain some distinction and local reputation; he has long been married to Aline. One day while his friend Doctor Herdal is visiting, Solness has another caller: 22-year-old out-of-towner Hilde Wangel, whom the Doctor promptly recognizes from a recent trip.

Soon after the Doctor leaves and Solness is alone with Hilde, she reminds him that they are not strangers; they previously met in her home 10 years ago when she was 12. When Solness does not respond to her quickly enough, she reminds him that at one point he made advances to her, offered a romantic interlude, and promised her "castles in the sky" during their encounter, which she believed. He denies this, but she gradually convinces him that she can assist him with his household duties and he brings her into his home.

During the construction of his most recent project, which includes towering steeples, Hilde learns that Solness suffers from acrophobia, a morbid fear of extreme heights, but nonetheless encourages him to climb the steeples to their very heights at the public opening of the newly-completed building. Inspired by her words, Solness begins his ascent to the top of the steeples. At this point it is revealed that this entire time with Hilde been imagined. Solness never left his bed. As, in the imaginary setting, Solness hangs the wreath on the new house he built for his wife, he dies.

== Cast ==
- Wallace Shawn as Halvard Solness
- Julie Hagerty as Aline Solness
- Lisa Joyce as Hilde Wangel
- André Gregory as Knut Brovik
- Larry Pine as Dr. Herdal
- Joanna Feuer as Nurse Nora
- Emily Cass McDonnell as Kaia Fosli
- Jeff Biehl as Ragnar Brovik
- Winsome Brown, Sheilagh Weymouth and Marjorie Graham as Nurses

== Production ==
André Gregory said that he was drawn to the play due to his age and the themes of redemption. Gregory said of Joyce that she is "astounding" and hopes that her career takes off, and Demme said that they were all "blown away" by her performance.

== Release ==
A Master Builder premiered at the Rome Film Festival under the title Fear of Falling. Abramorama released the film in New York on July 23, 2014. In February 2015, after a limited theatrical release in several cities in the United States, the film was released for distribution in streaming video through Amazon.

== Reception ==
Rotten Tomatoes, a review aggregator, reports that 82% of 33 surveyed critics gave the film a positive review; the average rating is 6.9/10. Metacritic rated it 67 out of 100 based on 17 reviews. David Edelstein of New York wrote that the film "brings the genius of Ibsen to the screen in a way I never thought was possible." Jay Weissberg of Variety called it "constricted and uninspired". Stephen Holden of The New York Times wrote that Shawn "employs insidious sleight of hand to score moral points". Jordan Mintzer of The Hollywood Reporter wrote, "Wallace Shawn shines in this well-acted piece of filmed theater." The magazine Architectural Record gave the film a mixed review, singling out Julie Hagerty's performance opposite Wallace Shawn as exceptional.
