= My Dinner with Andre =

1981 film by Louis Malle

- Theatrical release poster
- Directed by: Louis Malle
- Written by: Wallace Shawn; André Gregory
- Produced by: George W. George; Beverly Karp
- Starring: André Gregory; Wallace Shawn
- Cinematography: Jeri Sopanen
- Edited by: Suzanne Baron
- Music by: Allen Shawn
- Distributed by: New Yorker Films
- Release date: October 11, 1981
- Running time: 111 minutes
- Country: United States
- Language: English
- Budget: $475,000
- Box office: $5.2 million

My Dinner with Andre is a 1981 American comedy-drama film directed by Louis Malle, and written by and starring André Gregory and Wallace Shawn as fictionalized versions of themselves sharing a conversation at Café des Artistes in Manhattan. The film's dialogue covers topics such as experimental theater, the nature of theater, and the nature of life, and contrasts Andre's spiritual experiences with Wally's modest humanism.

Reception was largely positive upon initial release, and over time My Dinner with Andre has come to be regarded as a classic.

== Plot ==
Struggling playwright and actor Wally dreads having dinner with his old friend Andre, whom he has been avoiding since Andre gave up his career as a theater director in 1975 amidst a midlife crisis and embarked on an extended hiatus during which he traveled the world. Wally reflects that as he has aged he has had to focus more on making money than art.

At Café des Artistes in Manhattan, Andre tells Wally about some of the adventures he has had since they last saw each other, which included working with his mentor Jerzy Grotowski and a group of Polish actors in a forest in Poland; traveling to the Sahara while trying to create a play based on The Little Prince by Antoine de Saint-Exupéry; and visiting the ecological commune Findhorn in Scotland. The last in this string of events was when Andre and a small group of friends arranged Halloween-themed experiences for each other at an estate in Montauk, New York, including the participants being briefly buried alive.

While Andre says he needed to do all of these things to get out of the rut he was in and learn how to be human, Wally argues that living as Andre has done for the past several years is not possible for most people. He describes how he finds pleasure in more ordinary things, like a cup of coffee or his new electric blanket. Andre asserts that focusing too much on comfort can be dangerous, and says that what passes for normal life in New York City is more akin to living in a dream than reality. He expresses fears of impending totalitarianism and a continued unease with the place of art in society. While Wally agrees with many of Andre's criticisms of modern society, he takes issue with the more mystical aspects of Andre's stories.

After all of the other customers have already left the restaurant, the friends, each having expressed themselves openly and feeling heard by the other, part on good terms. Since Andre paid for dinner, Wally treats himself to a taxi ride, and he notices feeling a deep connection to all of the familiar places he passes on the way home. He narrates that, when he sees his girlfriend, he tells her all about his dinner with Andre.

== Cast ==
- André Gregory as Andre
- Wallace Shawn as Wallace "Wally" Shawn
- Jean Lenauer as Waiter
- Roy Butler as Bartender
- Cindy Lou Adkins as Coat-Check Girl (uncredited)

== Production ==
After spending several years away from the theater, André Gregory was looking to get back into it, so he asked his friend Wallace Shawn if he wanted to collaborate. Shawn knew that Gregory wanted to tell his story, even working with a biographer at one point, and suggested they develop a story consisting of a conversation between the two of them, with interest coming from their contrasting personalities and Gregory's anecdotes. Having recently acted in his first few films, Shawn saw the project as a film rather than a play.

Although the film was based on events in the actors' lives, Gregory and Shawn denied they were simply playing themselves; they stated in an interview with film critic Roger Ebert that, if they were to remake the film, they would swap characters in order to prove this point. In an interview with filmmaker Noah Baumbach in 2009, Shawn said of the version of himself portrayed in the film:

I actually had a purpose as I was writing this: I wanted to destroy that guy that I played, to the extent that there was any of me there. I wanted to kill that side of myself by making the film, because that guy is totally motivated by fear.

While Shawn and Gregory were trying to find a director for the film, Gregory received a phone call, which he initially thought was a prank, from French director Louis Malle, who said he had read a copy of the screenplay he received from a mutual friend and wanted to direct or produce the film. The writers brought Malle on board, and he worked with them to cut an hour from the three-hour script. Shawn later said that while he had carefully constructed the screenplay and would have preferred to make the longer film, Malle had won most of the arguments, and he credited Malle with infusing the film with a warmth that helped it connect with audiences.

A rehearsal held at a restaurant caused Malle to question whether the setting of the film should be changed, as the characters' eating seemed likely to create problems. Shawn and Gregory tried to think of what else their characters could be doing, but they wound up simply having Gregory, who does most of the talking in the film, eat much less than Shawn.

My Dinner with Andre was filmed over two weeks in December 1980 in Richmond, Virginia, in the then-vacant Jefferson Hotel, which has since been restored and reopened. The set was designed to resemble the Café des Artistes in New York City. Lloyd Kaufman was the film's production manager, and his Troma Entertainment provided production support.

== Real-life similarities ==
Throughout the film, Andre refers to his wife "Chiquita". In real life, André Gregory was married to Mercedes "Chiquita" Nebelthau until her death in 1992. Nebelthau was a documentary filmmaker whose credits include three films about Gregory's mentor Jerzy Grotowski, whom Andre and Wally discuss in the film.

In the film, Wally refers several times to his "girlfriend Debbie". Shawn's longtime partner in real life is writer Deborah Eisenberg, who had not yet published anything at the time of the film. Eisenberg makes an appearance early in the film as a dark-haired diner Wally sees while waiting for Andre at the bar.

At one point in the film, Andre refers to "ROC", a Scottish mathematician who claimed he met fauns and the god Pan; "ROC" was Robert Ogilvie Crombie, one of the founders of the Findhorn Foundation.

== Release ==
The film had its world premiere at the 1981 Telluride Film Festival.

== Reception ==
On review aggregator website Rotten Tomatoes, the film has an approval rating of 93% based on 27 reviews, with an average score of 7.8 out of 10. On Metacritic it has a score of 83 out of 100 based on 15 reviews, indicating "universal acclaim".

Roger Ebert and Gene Siskel gave high praise to the film on Sneak Previews; the producers later informed Ebert that this support helped keep the film in theaters for a year. Ebert chose it as the best film of 1981, and he and Siskel later ranked it as the fifth-best and fourth-best film, respectively, of the 1980s. In 1999, Ebert added the film to his Great Movies essay series, starting the retrospective review by stating: "Someone asked me the other day if I could name a movie that was entirely devoid of clichés. I thought for a moment, and then answered, My Dinner with Andre."

At the Boston Society of Film Critics Awards 1981, the film won Best American Film of 1981 and Shawn and Gregory won Best Screenplay.

== See also ==
- List of films featuring fictional films
