= Parker Family Saga =

American media franchise

Jean Shepherd's Parker Family Saga
- Official film series home video release artwork
- Created by: Jean Shepherd
- Original work: In God We Trust: All Others Pay Cash (1966)
- Years: 1976-2022

Print publications
- Novel: In God We Trust: All Others Pay Cash (1966)

Films and television
- Films: A Christmas Story (1983); It Runs in the Family: My Summer Story (1994); A Christmas Story Christmas (2022)
- Television special: A Christmas Story Live! (2017)
- Television films: The Phantom of the Open Hearth (1976); The Great American Fourth of July and Other Disasters (1982); The Star-Crossed Romance of Josephine Cosnowski (1985); Ollie Hopnoodle's Haven of Bliss (1988)
- Direct-to-video: A Christmas Story 2 (2012)

Theatrical presentations
- Play: A Christmas Story (2000)
- Musical: A Christmas Story: The Musical

The Parker Family Saga is a collection of American family-comedies based upon the stories of author Jean Shepherd. The stories originated on Shepherd's radio programs and in his books before being adapted into a stage play, two theatrical films, four made-for-TV films, one straight-to-home video film, one unaired pilot episode for a planned television series, one musical adaptation, one live television adaptation of that musical and one made-for-streaming film.

All of the productions in the saga center around Ralphie Parker, a child in the 1930s and 1940s in suburban Indiana, and his friends and family. Ralphie Parker was loosely based upon Shepherd's childhood. For the rest of his life, Shepherd was the first-person narrator for all productions involving the character. Shepherd publicly claimed that all of his work was entirely fictional, but the names of his own friends and family are in his books.

== Terminology ==
It is also known as the Jean Shepherd's Parker Family Saga franchise, the Ralph Parker franchise, or colloquially the A Christmas Story franchise).

== Origin ==
The franchise is based on the 1966 American comedic novel In God We Trust: All Others Pay Cash, authored by Jean Shepherd. The book details fictionalized stories from his childhood. Work began on the novel, after initially writing and releasing short stories in Playboy magazine and broadcasting other stories on radio productions. Released in October 1966, and published by Doubleday and Broadway Books, the release earned a spot on The New York Times' Best Seller list. In God We Trust was received positively from critics, for its humor and relatable stories.

The week of Shepherd's death, the novel became Amazon's 142nd best selling novel. The book served as the premise for the franchise, with Shepherd's work incorporated into a series of films, television productions, and stage plays.

== Film ==
Title	U.S. release date	Director(s)	Screenwriter(s)	Story by	Producer(s)
The Phantom of the Open Hearth	December 23, 1976	Fred Barzyk & David Loxton	Jean Shepherd		Fred Barzyk and David Loxton
The Great American Fourth of July and Other Disasters	March 16, 1982	Dick Bartlett	Jean Shepherd		Olivia Tappan
A Christmas Story	November 18, 1983	Bob Clark	Jean Shepherd, Leigh Brown & Bob Clark		René Dupont and Bob Clark
The Star-Crossed Romance of Josephine Cosnowski	February 11, 1985	Fred Barzyk	Jean Shepherd		Olvia Tappan
Ollie Hopnoodle's Haven of Bliss	August 6, 1988	Dick Bartlett	Jean Shepherd		Olvia Tappan
It Runs in the Family: My Summer Story	September 23, 1994	Bob Clark	Jean Shepherd & Leigh Brown and Bob Clark		René Dupont
A Christmas Story 2	October 30, 2012	Brian Levant	Nat Mauldin		Brian Levant and Phillip B. Goldfine
A Christmas Story Christmas	November 17, 2022	Clay Kaytis	Nick Schenk and Clay Kaytis	Nick Schenk and Peter Billingsley	Peter Billingsley and Vince Vaughn

=== The Phantom of the Open Hearth (1976) ===
Released as a made-for-television film, the movie was met with mixed critical reception, but it is credited with providing studio interest in the eventual creation of A Christmas Story years later.

A middle-aged Ralph Parker introduces the film and serves as a narrator. Set during the late-1940s to early-1950s America, high school-aged Ralph prepares for the upcoming junior prom. Every day at school he tries to overcome his shyness and ask his crush, a popular classmate named Daphne Bigelow, to the event. At home, Ralph finds himself at odds with his father and his over-involved mother. His parents are busy with their own interests. Mr. Parker once again orders a tasteless lamp from a contest he won in an advertisement, and Mrs. Parker often attends "dish night" at the local movie theater to acquire a collection of dinner dishes. Though Ralph decides to ask his geeky neighbor Wanda Hickey to the dance, he continues to wish he could win the affections of Daphne. Later with his friends and their dates, Ralph drinks alcohol excessively. The group finds themselves sick and vomiting in the bathroom stall, during the eventful night of junior prom.

=== The Great American Fourth of July and Other Disasters (1982) ===
Released as a made-for-television film, debuting on American Playhouse, season one, episode ten, the film was met with moderately positive critical reception. In the years since, the film has been labeled as a Fourth of July holiday movie essential.

Set during the late-1940s to early-1950s America, high school-aged Ralph Parker prepares himself for the perceived date of his lifetime, with his friend's attractive cousin named Pamela. While he plans the event with precision, his mother and father each respectively prepare to celebrate the nation's Independence Day. Mrs. Parker passes a chain letter around the neighborhood, while inheriting a large sum of wash rags. Mr. Parker decides to display his patriotism by lighting off Roman Candle fireworks from his pockets that night during the neighborhood event. Though Ralph believes he's prepared for the date, he ultimately embarrasses himself. Meanwhile, the parents come to terms with the neighbors' perceptions of their family.

=== A Christmas Story (1983) ===
Released theatrically, to mixed-to mild critical reception and mild box office returns, A Christmas Story has become a Christmas classic.

Set in Indiana in a time period suggesting the late 1930s, a young elementary school aged Ralph "Ralphie" Parker spends much of his time avoiding the persistent bullying at school and dreaming of his ideal Christmas gift, a Red Ryder Range Model air rifle. Seeking to preserve the integrity of his glasses, he continues to evade (then eventually confront) the school bullies and scheme to find a way to convince the adults in his life that he can be trusted with the gun, as all of the adults think he will shoot his eye out with it. Along the way, he learns to appreciate his mother's love for him, learns a valuable lesson about radio advertising, and observes the behavior of his irascible but loving father, the Old Man.

=== The Star-Crossed Romance of Josephine Cosnowski (1985) ===
Released as a made-for-television film, debuting on American Playhouse, season four, episode nine, the film was met with positive critical reception, with praise directed at the script, returning cast, and its Thanksgiving setting.

A fully grown, middle-aged Ralph Parker introduces the film as the character is going to a movie in theaters directed by a Polish director, which reminds him of a memory from his past. Set during the late-1940s to early-1950s America, high school aged Ralph Parker prepares for Thanksgiving celebrations with his family. His father, Mr. Parker decides that he wants to buy a new family vehicle and starts the processes of purchasing a yellow colored Buick, while his younger brother Randy practices for his role as a turkey in school Thanksgiving Day play. As the holiday approaches, a Polish family moves in. With the excitement of new next-door neighbors, Ralph discovers that the daughter is the girl of his dreams. He begins his first serious relationship. The pair soon discover that their courtship may prove more difficult to manage than necessary.

=== Ollie Hopnoodle's Haven of Bliss (1988) ===
Released as a made-for-television film, as a collaboration between American Playhouse and Walt Disney Television, the film was met with mixed-to-positive critical reception.

Set during 1950s America, high school-aged Ralph Parker applies for his first summer break job with his friends. After various applications, the group gets hired to work at Scott's Used Furniture Palace. With plans to save their money, they endure tiring conditions of delivering heavy appliances such as refrigerators up flights of stairs. The work quickly becomes Ralph's source of pain, stress, and nightmares. In the meantime, as the Parkers prepare for their planned vacation, they soon discover that their family dog named Fuzzhead is missing. Though Mr. Parker is unfazed, Mrs. Parker threatens her husband with cancelling their trip if they cannot find the animal. When the pair post poorly drawn posters with a large reward for the return of their pet, countless neighbors appear with various dogs with hopes of earning the prize money. Later, the couple find Fuzzhead riding in the back of Rolls-Royce and pursue the driver until they are able to regain possession of Fuzzhead. Meanwhile, after Ralph is fired from his job, he tells his parents that he quit so that he can join them on their family roadtrip.

Together, the family prepares for the ultimate getaway to Ollie Hopnoodle's Haven of Bliss. Over-packed, the family encounters comedic events along the way. Fully expecting their destination to be a place of relaxation, the family may find more misadventures upon arrival.

=== It Runs in the Family: My Summer Story (1994) ===
Released as a limited theatrical film, the film was met with mixed-to-positive critical reception. Praise was directed to its tone, the plot's pace, use of humor similar to A Christmas Story, and character development. Conversely, criticism was placed on the film's cast.

Set during the summer of 1941, the year following the events of A Christmas Story, Ralph "Ralphie" Parker struggles in his pursuits to avoid the new bully named Scut Farkus. Every day at school, Ralphie attempts to beat Farkus in a game of spinning tops. Despite his repeated attempts at having the last top standing in the chalk circle boundaries, Ralphie continues to be defeated. Meanwhile, Mrs. Parker finds herself at odds with the owner of their local theater over a number of questionable giveaways. When the owner starts a "Dish Night" event, she becomes obsessed with receiving the entire collection of celebrity dishware being handed out. She however begins to call into question the owner's ethics, and gets the town's housewives on her side in the process. Mr. Parker finds himself teaching Ralphie how to fish, much to Randy's jealousy, all while feeling in competition with his country neighbors, the Bumpus family. Frustrated with their persistent boisterous music, their Bloodhound dog, and their recently installed outhouse which he is certain is a municipal violation, Mr. Parker seeks to rid their town of the Bumpuses.

=== A Christmas Story 2 (2012) ===
Released as a straight-to-DVD film and as direct sequel to the original film (while ignoring My Summer Story from 1994), the film was met with a mostly-negative reception. While the film was given praise for attempts to portray 1940s-era America, criticisms were directed at reliance on slapstick humor and its inferior derivation of the 1983 film.

Set during 1946 American Christmastime, teenaged 15-year-old Ralph "Ralphie" Parker repeatedly tells his parents that all he wants for Christmas is a 1939 Mercury Eight convertible, which he secretly hopes will help him win the courtship of the classmate he has been crushing on named Drucilla Gootrad. When he attempts to test drive the vehicle at a local used car dealership, he unintentionally causes the car to back off of a display ramp, tapping into a lightpost, and tearing the convertible roof due to a plastic reindeer falling through it. Afraid that his father is going to find out, Ralph attains a job at Higbee's with his best friends to earn the necessary funds to pay the owner for the damages. The group quickly gets reassigned to various departments within the store, before getting into a fight amongst each other and with the store Santa Claus, culminating in getting fired from their positions. Ralphie pleads for his job and convinces the store to rehire him. As Christmas arrives, he discovers that he is one dollar short but attains the needed banknote from one of his friends. On his way to pay the dealership owner for the damages sustained to the Mercury, decides to donate a sum of the money to a less fortunate family. Convinced that he is going to jail, Ralphie is surprised by a series perceived Christmas miracles: the owner lets him go without any legal action, he receives the car he wanted from his parents after all, and additionally gets a girlfriend in the form of the girl he has been infatuated with.

=== A Christmas Story Christmas (2022) ===
Another direct sequel to A Christmas Story was directed by Clay Kaytis, with a script written by Nick Schenk (who also served as executive producer). Peter Billingsley reprised his role as Ralph "Ralphie" Parker, while the plot was set during latter December 1973 with the now-grown character returning to his childhood home with his family for Christmas, following the death of his father (aka The Old Man). The cast features the character's childhood friends, while Julie Hagerty was cast as Mrs. Parker, his mother, in a role originated played by Melinda Dillon (who retired from acting in 2007, was in poor health during the filming of the sequel and died in 2023 less than two months after its release) in the original film. Ian Petrella, Scott Schwartz, R. D. Robb, and Zack Ward reprise their roles as Randy Parker, Flick, Schwartz, and Scut Farkus, respectively. Erinn Hayes, River Drosche, and Julianna Layne joined the cast as Ralphie's wife and his kids. Billingsley produced the film with Vince Vaughn. The project was a joint-venture production between Legendary Pictures, Warner Bros. Pictures, Wild West Picture Show Productions, and HBO Max Original Films. The film was dedicated to the memory of Darren McGavin (who played "The Old Man" in the original film) who died on February 25, 2006.

The film was released in the United States via streaming in November 2022, on HBO Max by Warner Bros. Discovery Global Streaming & Interactive Entertainment.

== Television ==
=== Unaired television pilot ===
The Phantom of the Open Hearth was reshot, reimagined and planned to serve as the pilot episode for an ongoing television series with an intended release in 1978. Though the finished product never aired, production was completed. The production was directed by John Rich, with a script by Jean Shepherd, cinematography by Roland 'Ozzie' Smith, and editing from Dick Bartlett. Filmed with a production title the same as the 1976 film, the cast included John Shepherd (unrelated to the author), Richard Venture, Barbara Bolton, and Jean Shepherd as young Ralph "Ralphie" Parker, Mr. Parker, Mrs. Parker, and Ralph Parker/the Narrator, respectively. The series' inaugural episode notedly included the original introduction of the now-famous line: "Oh, fudge (but I didn't say 'fudge')!" which was later introduced in A Christmas Story. Jean Shepherd was thoroughly displeased with the finished product for its overuse of slapstick.

=== A Christmas Story: Live! (2017) ===
Produced as a live television special released in December 2017, it was met with mixed-to-negative at best critical reception in favor of the original film. Critiques were directed at the tone, the running time, the Broadway musical numbers and the perceived usage of "cutesyness". The show premiered to 4.5 million viewers.

Scott Ellis and Alex Rudzinski co-directed the special, with a telescript co-written by Robert Cary and Jonathan Tolins. Benj Pasek and Justin Paul, who wrote the original Broadway show, collaborated to write additional lyrics and music for additional songs in the three-hour long special. Tolins and Cary co-wrote the accompanying novelization. The project was a joint-venture production between Fox Television, and Warner Horizon Unscripted & Alternative Television. Marc Platt served as producer. A nationwide open casting call was made in order to find a child actor to cast in the role of Ralph "Ralphie" Parker. Andy Walken was cast in the role of Ralphie Parker.

== Stage ==
=== Play ===
Prior to the release of A Christmas Story, Bob Clark and Jean Shepherd wrote the first draft for the script, with the first draft having a working title that was the same as Shepherd's original play, In God We Trust. The film script was based on the play, which in turn was also based on the similarly named novel.

A two-act play based upon A Christmas Story was released in 2000. It is adapted from the film script, with modifications by Philip Grecian.

=== Musical ===
The musical theater adaptation of A Christmas Story was released in December 2009 at Kansas City Repertory Theatre in Missouri, as a pre-Broadway engagement with music and lyrics by Scott Davenport Richards. Directed by Eric Rosen, with a playscript, libretto, and novelization by Joseph Robinette, it was met with a warm reception from critics. Following the initial release however, Richards departed the production. Benj Pasek and Justin Paul were hired to rewrite the score and lyrics for the relaunch of the musical which debuted in December 2010. The musical adaptation was produced by Gerald Goehring, Michael F. Mitri, Robert G. Bartner, and Michael A. Jenkins as a Bartner/Jenkins Entertainment stage production. The reimagined musical was met with critical acclaim, and was a financial success on Broadway.

== Main cast and characters ==
List indicators

This section includes characters who will appear or have appeared in the franchise in main roles.

- An empty grey cell indicates the character was not in the film, or that the character's official presence has not yet been confirmed.
- ^{A} indicates an appearance through archival footage or audio.
- ^{O} indicates an older version of the character.
- ^{P} indicates an appearance in onscreen photographs.
- ^{U} indicates an uncredited appearance.
- ^{V} indicates a voice-only role.

Character	Film								Television
Character	The Phantom of the Open Hearth	The Great American Fourth of July and Other Disasters	A Christmas Story	The Star-Crossed Romance of Josephine Cosnowski	Ollie Hopnoodle's Haven of Bliss	It Runs in the Family: My Summer Story	A Christmas Story 2	A Christmas Story Christmas	A Christmas Story: Live!
Principal cast
Ralph "Ralphie" Parker	David Elliot Jean Shepherd^{O}	Matt Dillon Jean Shepherd^{O}^{V} (Note: When the film was later re-released on the Disney Channel, a prologue scene was added to include Shepherd reprising his role in portraying on-screen a middle-aged Ralph Parker.)	Peter Billingsley Jean Shepherd^{O}^{V}	Pete Kowanko Jean Shepherd^{O}	Jerry O'Connell Jean Shepherd^{O}^{V}	Kieran Culkin Jean Shepherd^{O}^{V}	Braeden Lemasters Nat Mauldin^{O}^{V}	Peter Billingsley Joseph Al Ahmad^{V}^{U}	Andy Walken Matthew Broderick^{O}
Ralph "Ralphie" Parker	David Elliot Jean Shepherd^{O}	Matt Dillon Jean Shepherd^{O}^{V}	Peter Billingsley Jean Shepherd^{O}^{V}	Pete Kowanko Jean Shepherd^{O}	Jerry O'Connell Jean Shepherd^{O}^{V}	Kieran Culkin Jean Shepherd^{O}^{V}	Braeden Lemasters Nat Mauldin^{O}^{V}	Jean Shepherd^{A}^{V}	Andy Walken Matthew Broderick^{O}
Randy Parker	Adam Goodman	Jay Ine	Ian Petrella	Jay Ine	Jason Clarke Adams	Christian Culkin	Valin Shinyei	Ian Petrella	Tyler Wladis
Bob Parker "The Old Man"	James Broderick	James Broderick	Darren McGavin	George Coe	James Sikking	Charles Grodin	Daniel Stern	Darren McGavin^{A}^{P}^{V}	Chris Diamantopoulos
Mrs. Parker	Barbara Bolton	Barbara Bolton	Melinda Dillon	Barbara Bolton	Dorothy Lyman	Mary Steenburgen	Stacey Travis	Julie Hagerty	Maya Rudolph
Mrs. Parker	Barbara Bolton	Barbara Bolton	Melinda Dillon	Barbara Bolton	Dorothy Lyman	Mary Steenburgen	Stacey Travis	Melinda Dillon^{A}^{P}	Maya Rudolph
Sandy Parker								Erinn Hayes	
Mark Parker								River Drosche Billy Brayshaw^{O} (Note: Brayshaw portrays the character during a sequence that depicts Ralph Parker's imagination.)	
Julie Parker								Julianna Layne Tegan Grace Muggeridge^{O} (Note: Muggeridge portrays the character during a sequence that depicts Ralph Parker's imagination.)	
Supporting cast
Flick	William Lampley	William Lampley	Scott Schwartz	William Lampley	Cameron Johann	Geoffrey Wigdor	David W. Thompson	Scott Schwartz	JJ Batteast
Schwartz	Bryan Utman	Jeffery Yonis	R. D. Robb	Jeff Yonis	Ross Eldridge	David Zahorsky	David Buehrle	R. D. Robb	Sammy Ramirez
Carl Parker	Ed Huberman								
Daphne Bigelow	Tobi Pilavin								
Wanda Hickey	Roberta Wallach								
Ludlow Kissel		Babe Sargent							
Pamela		Lisa Jacobsen							
Scut Farkus			Zack Ward			Chris Owen		Zack Ward	Sacha Carlson
Grover Dill			Yano Anaya			T.J. McInturff		Yano Anaya (Note: Anaya portrays the character during a sequence that depicts Ralph Parker's imagination.)	Elie Samouhi
Miss Shields			Tedde Moore			Tedde Moore			Jane Krakowski
Higbee's Santa Claus			Jeff Gillen				Garry Chalk	David Gillespie	David Alan Grier
Josephine "Josie" Cosnowski				Katherine Kamhi					
Stosh "Bubba" Cosnowski				Armen Garo					
Alex "Killer" Cosnowski				James T. Lahiff					
Mrs. Cosnowski				Joan Tolentino					
Mr. Cosnowski				William B. Lynch					
Father Casmir				Frank Toste C.S.C.					
Ollie Hopnoodle					Desmond Dhooge				
Leopold Doppler						Glenn Shadix			
Mr. Winchell						Roy Brocksmith			
Drucilla Gootrad							Tiera Skovbye		
Hank Catenhauser							Gerard Plunkett		
Higbee's Assistant Manager							Shawn Macdonald		

== Additional crew and production details ==
Title	Crew/Detail					
Title	Composer(s)	Cinematographer	Editor(s)	Production companies	Distributing company	Running time
The Phantom of the Open Hearth	Paul Taubman and Joseph Raposo	Peter Hoving	Dick Bartlett	Visions, The Television Laboratory at WBNET/13, The WBGH New Television Workshop	Public Broadcasting System	94 min
The Great American Fourth of July and Other Disasters	David Amram and Marcus Miller	Peter Hoving	Dick Bartlett & Jeanne Jordan	American Playhouse, The Disney Channel, South Carolina Educational Television	Public Broadcasting System	75 min
A Christmas Story	Carl Zittrer & Paul Zaza	Reginald H. Morris	Stan Cole	Metro-Goldwyn-Mayer Studios	MGM/UA Entertainment Co.	94 min
The Star-Crossed Romance of Josephine Cosnowski	David Amram	Peter Hoving	Dick Bartlett	American Playhouse, The WGBH New Television Workshop, Creative Television Associates Inc., WGBH Educational Foundation	Public Broadcasting System	56 min
Ollie Hopnoodle's Haven of Bliss	Steve Olenick	D'Arcy Marsh	Dick Bartlett & Bill Anderson	Polly Inc., WGBH Boston, American Playhouse, WGBH Educational Foundation	Disney Channel, Disney–ABC Domestic Television, Walt Disney Home Media	89 min
It Runs in the Family: My Summer Story	Paul Zaza	Stephen M. Katz	Stan Cole	Metro-Goldwyn-Mayer Studios	Metro-Goldwyn-Mayer	85 min
A Christmas Story 2	David Newman	Jan Kiesser	Roger Bondelli	Hollywood Media Bridge, Telvan Productions	Warner Premiere	86 min
A Christmas Story Christmas	Jeff Morrow	Matthew Clark	David Heinz	Warner Bros. Pictures, Legendary Pictures, Wild West Pictures Show Productions, HBO Max Original Films, Turner Entertainment Co.	HBO Max	98 min

== Reception ==
=== Box office and financial performance ===
Film	Box office gross			Box office ranking		Home video sales gross	Worldwide total gross income	Budget	Worldwide total net income	Ref(s)
Film	North America	Other territories	Worldwide	All-time North America	All-time worldwide	North America	Worldwide total gross income	Budget	Worldwide total net income	Ref(s)
The Phantom of the Open Hearth	—N/a	—N/a	—N/a	—N/a	—N/a	—N/a	—N/a	Information not publicly available	Information not publicly available	
The Great American Fourth of July and Other Disasters	—N/a	—N/a	—N/a	—N/a	—N/a	—N/a	—N/a	Information not publicly available	Information not publicly available	
A Christmas Story	$20,640,209	—N/a	$20,640,209	#3,596	#4,994	$75,499,043	$96,139,252	$3,250,000	$92,889,252	
The Star-Crossed Romance of Josephine Cosnowski	—N/a	—N/a	—N/a	—N/a	—N/a	—N/a	—N/a	Information not publicly available	Information not publicly available	
Ollie Hopnoodle's Haven of Bliss	—N/a	—N/a	—N/a	—N/a	—N/a	—N/a	—N/a	Information not publicly available	Information not publicly available	
It Runs in the Family: My Summer Story	$70,936	—N/a	$70,936	Information not publicly available	—N/a	Information not publicly available	≥$70,936	$15,000,000	≥-$14,929,064	
A Christmas Story 2	—N/a	—N/a	—N/a	—N/a	—N/a	$3,851,496	≥$3,851,496	Information not publicly available	<$3,851,496	
A Christmas Story Christmas	—N/a	—N/a	—N/a	—N/a	—N/a	—N/a	—N/a	Information not publicly available	Information not publicly available	
Totals	$20,711,145	$0	$20,711,145	x̄ #1,798 (Note: This is an approximate average, based on the all-time standing of each theatrically released film in the franchise.)	x̄ #2,497 (Note: This is an approximate average, based on the all-time foreign standing of each theatrically released film in the franchise.)	$79,350,539 (Note: This is an approximate calculated figure, based on the available information regarding home video release sales of each film in the franchise.)	≥$100,061,684 (Note: This is an approximate calculated figure, based on the available information regarding the gross total income of each film in the franchise.)	>$18,250,000 (Note: This is an approximate calculated figure, based on the available information regarding the production budgets of each film in the franchise.)	~≤$81,811,684 (Note: This is an approximate calculated figured, based on the available information regarding the net total income of each film in the franchise.)	

=== Critical and public response ===
Film	Rotten Tomatoes	Metacritic
The Phantom of the Open Hearth	—N/a	—N/a
The Great American Fourth of July and Other Disasters	—N/a	—N/a
A Christmas Story	89% (57 reviews)	77/100 (16 reviews)
The Star-Crossed Romance of Josephine Capowski	—N/a	—N/a
Ollie Hopnoodle's Haven of Bliss	TBD	—N/a
It Runs in the Family: My Summer Story	TBD	45/100 (5 reviews)
A Christmas Story 2	TBD	—N/a
A Christmas Story: Live!	43% (14 reviews)	61/100 (11 reviews)
A Christmas Story Christmas	79% (34 reviews)	56/100 (8 reviews)

== Legacy ==
The Parker Family Saga, particularly through its flagship installment A Christmas Story, has become a cornerstone of American holiday traditions, most notably through its annual 24-hour television marathon on TNT and TBS. Launched in 1997 by TNT as a promotional stunt, the network aired the film 12 times from Christmas Eve into Christmas Day. It marathon quickly evolved into a cultural ritual, drawing tens of millions of viewers annually, solidifying the film's status as a festive staple. In addition, Red Ryder BB guns, central to young Ralphie Parker's obsession in the film, are produced as collectibles. Fan engagement also extends to dedicated sites and conventions, most notably the A Christmas Story House in Cleveland, Ohio where guests celebrate the franchise's lore.
