= A Christmas Story 2 =

- DVD cover
- Directed by: Brian Levant
- Written by: Nat Mauldin
- Based on: In God We Trust: All Others Pay Cash by Jean Shepherd
- Produced by: Brian Levant; Phillip B. Goldfine
- Starring: Braeden Lemasters; Daniel Stern; Stacey Travis; Valin Shinyei
- Narrated by: Nat Mauldin
- Cinematography: Jan Kiesser
- Edited by: Roger Bondelli
- Music by: David Newman
- Production companies: Warner Premiere; Hollywood Media Bridge; Telvan Productions; Turner Entertainment
- Distributed by: Warner Home Video
- Release date: October 30, 2012
- Running time: 86 minutes
- Countries: United States; Canada
- Language: English

A Christmas Story 2 is a 2012 Christmas comedy film directed by Brian Levant and starring Daniel Stern and Braeden Lemasters. The film is a direct sequel to the 1983 film A Christmas Story and ignores the events of the 1994 film My Summer Story. The film, set six years after the original, follows fifteen-year-old Ralphie as he wishes for a 1939 Mercury Eight convertible for Christmas, but crashes the car before he even owns it. Now, Ralphie and his friends, Flick and Schwartz, must find a way to raise enough money to fix the car before Christmas.

Although billed as an "official sequel" in the trailer, the film is not directly based on any of Jean Shepherd's writings nor is he involved due to his death in 1999. Instead, it has an original script by Nat Mauldin, who also narrates in place of the late Shepherd (the subplot of Ralphie and his friends finding jobs and getting fired was originally by Shepherd and had previously been included in Ollie Hopnoodle's Haven of Bliss).

The film was released straight to DVD by Warner Home Video on October 30, 2012, to mostly negative reviews. A second direct sequel, which takes place 33 years after the events of the original film with most of its original cast returning, titled A Christmas Story Christmas, was released on November 17, 2022, on HBO Max and received generally better critical reception.

== Plot ==
The film takes place in 1946, six years after the events of the original film. Ralphie is now fifteen years old, and all he wants is a used 1939 Mercury Eight convertible for Christmas. He tries testing the car out when he sees it on a display ramp, but he accidentally causes the car to roll back out of the used car lot and gently tap a light pole, causing a plastic reindeer to loosen and fall through the convertible top. Ralphie bands together with Flick and Schwartz to raise enough money to pay the dealer back for fixing it before Christmas so that the car dealer won't have Ralph arrested and presumably thrown in jail. He and his friends get a job and after going through several departments at the Higbee's store and in the end getting into a fight with the store Santa and then each other they all get fired. Ralphie does get his job back after some begging and pleading, but by Christmas Eve he finds he is still $1 short, so he and Flick rob Schwartz of his "lucky buck". While on the way to the dealer, Ralphie decides to donate a chunk for a less fortunate family. He winds up still off the hook with the owner of the dealership. In the end, he does get the car he wants for Christmas and the girlfriend he wants to go with it.

== Cast ==
- Braeden Lemasters as Ralph "Ralphie" Parker
  - Nat Mauldin as the Narrator
- Daniel Stern as Mr. Parker / The Old Man
- Stacey Travis as Mrs. Parker
- Valin Shinyei as Randy Parker
- David W. Thompson as Flick
- David Buehrle as Schwartz
- Tiera Skovbye as Drucilla Gootrad
- Gerard Plunkett as Hank Catenhauser
- Garry Chalk as Higbee's Store Santa (uncredited)
- Shawn Macdonald as Higbee's Assistant Manager

== Production ==
A Christmas Story 2 was filmed in New Westminster, British Columbia, Canada. The meat market scene was filmed in the Gastown section of Vancouver, British Columbia. The department store scene was in the city's primary train station.

The film had no involvement from Peter Billingsley, who had played Ralphie in the original film and indicated he had been pitched several proposals for sequels to A Christmas Story but rejected them all until 2022's A Christmas Story Christmas: "There's been some bad ideas that I've been pitched. Or people just wanting to monetize it. Any time something's successful, you know Hollywood: 'Do it again, do it again, do it again.' (...) The low-hanging fruit [was always], 'Ralphie wants something new. What object do adults want? And he'll go crazy trying to get it.' [There's] just no thought being put into what that journey was". Billingsley has, to date, refused to watch A Christmas Story 2.

== Release ==
The film was released straight to DVD on October 30, 2012. The DVD and Blu-ray versions included special features such as three bonus featurettes focusing on connecting the sequel to the original film, which include: "Catching Up With Ralphie and His Family," which features an overview of the returning characters aged five years; "A Christmas Story We All Know and Love," which highlights the charm and holiday elements of the franchise, and "The House 5 Years Older", which is a sneak peek at updates to the iconic Christmas Story house, which included holiday decorations like lights and a leg lamp.

In 2019, the film aired as part of the Best Christmas Ever block on AMC. As of 2023, it is available for streaming on HBO Max.

=== Critical reception ===
The film received mostly negative reviews. While being praised for attempts to portray 1940s-era America, much of the criticism was directed at the reliance of slapstick humor and its inferior derivation of the 1983 film. On review aggregator Rotten Tomatoes it has only three reviews from critics, all of them negative.

Critics panned the film for being an unnecessary and inferior sequel to the 1983 film. The website FleshEatingZipper stated that the slapstick elements in the film detracted from the movie while praising the attempt to "replicate a 40s-era Midwest". Brian Orndorf of Blu-ray.com wrote: "Shamelessly derivative and plasticized, A Christmas Story 2 will only have you wondering why you're not watching the original picture again".

Sandie Angulo Chen of Common Sense Media noted that there's "silly jokes abound but it's no original Christmas Story," and faulted that the teen-focused plot about Ralphie's obsession with a car and a girl is far less engaging than the child's BB gun fixation in its predecessor. Despite this, Chen praised the casting of Braeden Lemasters as a teenaged Ralphie Parker, who said "believably" resembles Peter Billingsley's original portrayal from the first film while also praising Daniel Stern as a "passable" Old Man. The website HaphazardStuff stated that, while praising the nostalgic appeal of the period-accurate old cars in the background and the narration's resemblance to Jean Shepherd's style, the site criticized the weak script and the exploitative cash-grab feel of the film. Similarly, Daniel Barnes of the Dare Daniel podcast rated the film a 1 out of 5, describing it as "a mean, angry, assaultive and annoying series of nostalgic callbacks and nasty characters."

The film frequently appears on lists of the worst sequels and worst holiday movies of all time, with much of the criticism centering on its lack of charm and fidelity to Jean Shepherd's source material.

== See also ==
- List of Christmas films
