= The Phantom of the Open Hearth =

- Official film logo
- Directed by: Fred Barzyk; David R. Loxton
- Written by: Jean Shepherd
- Based on: In God We Trust: All Others Pay Cash by Jean Shepherd
- Produced by: David R. Loxton
- Starring: David Elliott; James Broderick; Barbara Bolton; Adam Goodman; Jean Shepherd
- Cinematography: Peter Hoving
- Edited by: Dick Bartlett
- Music by: Paul Taubman; Joseph Raposo
- Production companies: New Television Workshop; WGBH Boston; WNET Channel 13 New York
- Distributed by: Public Broadcasting System (PBS)
- Release date: December 23, 1976
- Running time: 94 minutes
- Country: United States
- Language: English

The Phantom of the Open Hearth is an American made-for-television family-comedy film, directed by Fred Barzyk and David R. Loxton, with a script written by Jean Shepherd. Produced by Loxton, the film is the first screen adaptation to feature Shepherd's character Ralphie Parker, and is notable for influencing studio interest in A Christmas Story years later. Based on Shepherd's book In God We Trust: All Others Pay Cash and similar to all the other Parker Family films, the film depicts fictionalized events from his real-life childhood.

== Synopsis ==
A middle-aged Ralph Parker introduces the film, before the events of the film's flashback to the past. Set during 1950s America, high school-aged Ralph prepares for the upcoming junior-promenade dance. Every day at school he tries to overcome his shyness and ask his crush, a popular classmate named Daphne Bigelow, to the event. At home, Ralph finds himself at odds with his father and his over-involved mother. His parents are busy with their own interests: Mr. Parker looks forward to the arrival of a tasteless lamp shipment he won in a bowling contest (a story later adapted in A Christmas Story), while Mrs. Parker often attends "dish night" at the local movie theater to acquire a collection of dinner dishes (a story that reappears in My Summer Story). Though Ralph decides to ask his geeky neighbor Wanda Hickey to the dance, he continues to wish he could win the affections of Daphne. Later with his friends and their dates, Ralph drinks alcohol excessively. The group finds themselves sick and vomiting in the bathroom stall, during the eventful night of junior prom.

== Cast ==
- David Elliott as Ralph "Ralphie" Parker
  - Jean Shepherd as Ralph Parker/the Narrator
- James Broderick as Mr. Parker
- Barbara Bolton as Mrs. Parker
- Adam Goodman as Randy Parker
- William Lampley as Flick
- Bryan Utman as Schwartz
- Ed Huberman as Carl Parker
- Tobi Pilavin as Daphne Bigelow
- Roberta Wallach as Wanda Hickey

== Release ==
The Phantom of the Open Hearth was released on December 23, 1976, during an episode of PBS's anthological television series Visions.

=== Reception ===
Upon release the film was met with mostly positive reception, with praise directed at the sentimental value and nostalgic look at the history, the cast's performance, as well as Shepherd's skills in storytelling. Criticism stated that the plot took itself perhaps a little too seriously. Retrospective reviews give the television film mixed reviews.

== Sequels ==
The film was followed by a number of sequels, spawning a franchise of films, an adaptation for stage, and a television broadcast adaptation of that play. The film's first follow-up to be released was The Great American Fourth of July and Other Disasters in 1982.

=== Unaired television series adaptation ===
The film was reshot and intended to serve as the pilot episode for an ongoing series with a prospective release in 1978. Though the finished product never aired, production was completed. The production was directed by John Rich, with a script by Jean Shepherd, cinematography by Roland 'Ozzie' Smith, and editing from Dick Bartlett. Filmed with a working title the same as the 1976 film, the cast included John Shepherd, Richard Venture, Barbara Bolton, and Jean Shepherd as young Ralph "Ralphie" Parker, Mr. Parker, Mrs. Parker, and Ralph Parker/the Narrator, respectively. The series included the original introduction of the famous "Oh, fudge (but I didn't say 'fudge')!" line which was later introduced in A Christmas Story. Jean Shepherd was displeased with the pilot, commenting that it included too much slapstick, and it contributed to his dislike of commercial television; when a commercial television producer offered to sponsor a later teleplay, Shepherd insisted that the company have nothing to do with production.
