= A Christmas Story =

1983 film by Bob Clark

- Theatrical release poster
- Directed by: Bob Clark
- Screenplay by: Jean Shepherd; Leigh Brown; Bob Clark
- Based on: In God We Trust: All Others Pay Cash by Jean Shepherd
- Produced by: René Dupont; Bob Clark
- Starring: Melinda Dillon; Darren McGavin; Peter Billingsley
- Cinematography: Reginald H. Morris
- Edited by: Stan Cole
- Music by: Paul Zaza; Carl Zittrer
- Production company: Metro-Goldwyn-Mayer
- Distributed by: MGM/UA Entertainment Co.
- Release date: November 18, 1983
- Running time: 93 minutes
- Countries: United States; Canada
- Language: English
- Budget: $3.3 million
- Box office: $20.8 million

A Christmas Story is a 1983 Christmas comedy film directed by Bob Clark and based on the 1966 book In God We Trust: All Others Pay Cash by Jean Shepherd, with some elements from his 1971 book Wanda Hickey's Night of Golden Memories and Other Disasters. It stars Melinda Dillon, Darren McGavin, and Peter Billingsley, and follows a young boy and his family's misadventures during Christmastime in 1940. It is the first installment in the Parker Family Saga.

A Christmas Story was released by MGM/UA Entertainment Co. on November 18, 1983, and received positive reviews from critics. The film grossed $20.8 million on a $3.3 million budget. Filmed partly in Canada, the film earned two Canadian Genie Awards in 1984. Widely considered a holiday classic in the United States and Canada, it has been shown in a marathon annually on TNT since 1997 and on TBS since 2004 titled "24 Hours of A Christmas Story", consisting of 12 consecutive airings of the film from the evening of Christmas Eve to the evening of Christmas Day. In 2012, it was selected for preservation in the United States National Film Registry by the Library of Congress for being "culturally, historically, or aesthetically significant".

The film spawned three sequels. The first, My Summer Story (originally released as It Runs in the Family), also directed by Clark, was released in 1994. The second, entitled A Christmas Story 2, was released straight to DVD in 2012. A third sequel, entitled A Christmas Story Christmas, was released on HBO Max in 2022 and features most of the original cast returning.

== Plot ==
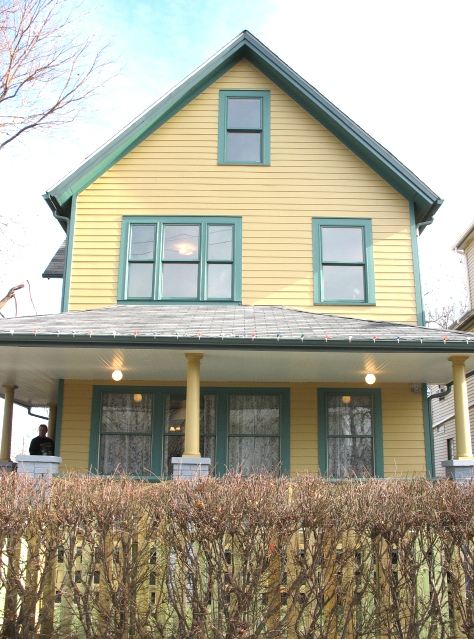
The front of the Parkers' house where A Christmas Story was filmed in the Tremont neighborhood of Cleveland's west side. The building was restored and reconfigured inside to match the soundstage interiors and is open to the public as A Christmas Story House.

The film is presented in a series of vignettes, with narration provided by the adult Ralphie Parker. As a 9-year-old boy living in Northwest Indiana around the late 1930s or early 1940s, all Ralphie wants for Christmas is a Red Ryder Carbine Action 200-shot Range Model air rifle. Ralphie's request is rebuffed by his mother, then by his teacher Miss Shields when he writes about it in an assigned theme, and even by a disgruntled Santa at Higbee's department store, all of whom tell Ralphie "You'll shoot your eye out".

On Christmas morning, Ralphie receives some presents that he enjoys, but is disappointed not to find the rifle among them. Ralphie's father ("The Old Man") directs him to one last box hidden in the corner, which proves to contain the rifle. Ralphie eagerly hurries outside to try it out, but when he shoots at the metal target he has set up, the BB ricochets and knocks off his glasses. Ralphie accidentally steps on and breaks the glasses while trying to find them; he makes up a cover story about an icicle falling from the roof of the garage and hitting his eye, which fools his mother and keeps him from getting into trouble.

That night, Ralphie goes to sleep with the gun by his side, as his adult self reflects that it was the best Christmas present he had ever received or would ever receive.

=== Other vignettes ===
Interspersed with the main story are several loosely related vignettes involving the Parkers:

- The Old Man is continually having to fix the unreliable household furnace; his frustrations cause him to swear profusely (heard as gibberish in the film), leading Ralphie to suspect a cloud of profanity "is still hanging in space over Lake Michigan".
- Ralphie's friends Flick and Schwartz argue over whether a tongue will stick to a cold flagpole. Schwartz escalates the dare to a "triple dog dare" and Flick reluctantly tries, getting stuck and requiring the fire department's help to get unstuck. The class collectively refuses to expose Schwartz; Miss Shields decides that the perpetrator's guilty conscience is punishment enough.
- The Old Man is delighted when he wins a "major award" in a newspaper contest – a table lamp in the shape of a woman's leg wearing a fishnet stocking. Mrs. Parker dislikes it, and the ensuing "Battle of the Lamp" ends with her "accidentally" breaking it. Unable to fix it, the Old Man sadly buries it in the backyard.
- Ralphie earns a decoder pin as a loyal listener to the Little Orphan Annie radio show. When the pin arrives, he frantically decodes Pierre Andre's secret message, revealing a "crummy commercial" for Ovaltine.
- While helping The Old Man change a tire, Ralphie blurts out a four-letter profanity starting in F (Note: Young Ralphie uses the word "fudge" in the dialogue, which his adult narrator counterpart clarifies was not what was actually said and that the real word—while not explicitly using it—was the "queen mother of dirty words," among other superlatives.) and gets his mouth washed out with Lifebuoy soap as a consequence. When Mrs. Parker demands to know where Ralphie learned the word, Ralphie (who actually learned it from The Old Man) blames Schwartz. Schwartz's mother spanks him offscreen, which adult Ralphie muses is justice for the triple dog dare. That night, Ralphie imagines his parents' reaction to him going blind from soap poisoning.
- Ralphie, his brother Randy, Flick, and Schwartz are tormented by the neighborhood bullies Scut Farkus and Grover Dill. Ralphie eventually snaps and attacks Farkus, unleashing a stream of vulgar gibberish similar to the Old Man's. Mrs. Parker breaks up the fight and escorts Ralphie home; Ralphie and Randy expect The Old Man to "kill" Ralphie when he finds out, but Mrs. Parker downplays the fight and distracts the Old Man by talking about football, earning Ralphie's respect.
- Ralphie's Aunt Clara gives him a pink bunny footed sleeper, which Mrs. Parker orders Ralphie to put on. Both Ralphie and The Old Man are disgusted by the infantile outfit, and Mrs. Parker agrees to only make Ralphie wear it when Aunt Clara is present.
- The Old Man is frequently chased by a pack of "smelly hound dogs" owned by the Parkers' hillbilly neighbors, the Bumpuses. On Christmas Day, the dogs invade the Parker house and devour their Christmas turkey. The Old Man takes the family to a Chinese restaurant, introducing Ralphie to "Chinese Turkey".

== Cast ==
- Peter Billingsley as Ralphie Parker
  - Jean Shepherd as adult Ralphie (voice) / man standing in the Santa Claus line at Higbee's
- Ian Petrella as Randy Parker
- Melinda Dillon as Mrs. Parker
- Darren McGavin as Mr. Parker/The Old Man (Note: The Old Man is not given a name in the dialogue or credits. The soundtrack includes a composition named "Bob's Major Award," which—along with Ralphie's last name being Parker—results in the presumed name Bob Parker.)
- Scott Schwartz as Flick
- R. D. Robb as Schwartz
- Zack Ward as Scut Farkus
- Yano Anaya as Grover Dill
- Tedde Moore as Miss Shields
- Jeff Gillen as Santa Claus
- Patty Johnson as Lead Elf
- Drew Hocevar as Male Elf
- Leslie Carlson as Christmas Tree Salesman

== Production ==
=== Development ===
The screenplay for A Christmas Story is based on material from author Jean Shepherd's collection of short stories, In God We Trust: All Others Pay Cash. Three of the semi-autobiographical short stories on which the film is based were originally published in Playboy magazine between 1964 and 1966. Shepherd later read "Duel in the Snow, or Red Ryder nails the Cleveland Street Kid" and told the otherwise unpublished story "Flick's Tongue" on his WOR Radio talk show, as can be heard in one of the DVD extras. Bob Clark stated on the DVD commentary that he became interested in Shepherd's work when he heard "Flick's Tongue" on the radio in 1968. Additional source material for the film, according to Clark, came from unpublished anecdotes that Shepherd told live audiences "on the college circuit". While shooting scenes in both Cleveland, Ohio, and Toronto, Ontario, in early 1983, Clark told a reporter that it had taken him a considerable number of years to get the film into production. Shepherd envisioned his stories as "Dickens's Christmas Carol as retold by Scrooge", although Clark would soften it for the film; the two did not particularly get along, as Clark did not admire Shepherd's attempts at trying to guide the actors with ideas about how the characters should be played, to the point where he had him barred from the set.

=== Casting ===
The basis of the screenplay is a series of monologues written and performed by Jean Shepherd on the radio. Shepherd wrote the adaptation with Bob Clark and Leigh Brown. Several subplots are incorporated into the body of the film, based on other separate short stories by Shepherd. Shepherd provides the film's narration from the perspective of an adult Ralphie, a narrative style later used in the comedy-drama television series The Wonder Years and the sitcom Young Sheldon. Shepherd, Brown, and Clark have cameo appearances in the film: Shepherd plays the man who directs Ralphie and Randy to the back of the Santa line at the department store; Brown – Shepherd's wife in real life – plays the woman in the Santa line with Shepherd; Clark plays Swede, the neighbor the Old Man talks to outside during the Leg Lamp scene.

In the DVD commentary, director Bob Clark mentions that Jack Nicholson was considered for the role of the Old Man; Clark expresses gratitude that he ended up with Darren McGavin instead, who later appeared in several other Clark films. James Broderick, who had portrayed the role in the television films, had died the year prior. He cast Melinda Dillon on the basis of her similar role in Close Encounters of the Third Kind. Peter Billingsley was Clark's first choice for Ralphie: he was already a successful actor in commercials and from co-hosting the TV series Real People. Clark recalled: "He walked in, and he had us from the beginning(.)" Fearing it was "too obvious" a choice, Clark auditioned approximately 8,000 actors for the part—among them Keith Coogan, Sean Astin and Wil Wheaton— before deciding Billingsley was the right choice after all. For the scene where Ralphie daydreams saving his family with BB Gun while chewing tobacco, the prop man initially took the script literally and gave the 12-year-old Billingsley real tobacco to chew, which made him ill; Clark reprimanded the prop man for the error and simulated the tobacco with raisins for the finished cut.

Ian Petrella was cast immediately before filming began. Tedde Moore had previously appeared in Clark's film Murder by Decree and was the only onscreen character from A Christmas Story who was played by the same actor in the sequel, My Summer Story. Jeff Gillen was an old friend of Clark's who had been in one of his earliest films. The schoolyard bully, Scut Farkus, was played by Zack Ward, now an actor, writer and director, who had actually been bullied himself while in elementary school. In 2017, he said he was surprised at the impact his role had over the years: "I saw that I was ranked – as Christmas villains go – higher than the Grinch. That's amazing."

=== Locations ===
The film is set in Hohman, Indiana, a fictionalized version of Shepherd's hometown of Hammond, the only Hoosier city to border Chicago. The name is derived from Hohman Avenue, a major street in downtown Hammond. Local references in the film include Warren G. Harding Elementary School and Cleveland Street (where Shepherd spent his childhood). Other local references include mention of a person "swallowing a yo-yo" in nearby Griffith, the Old Man being one of the fiercest "furnace fighters in Northern Indiana" and that his obscenities were "hanging in space over Lake Michigan", a mention of the Indianapolis 500, and the line to Santa Claus "stretching all the way to Terre Haute". The Old Man is also revealed to be a fan of the Bears (whom he jokingly calls the "Chicago Chipmunks") and White Sox, consistent with living in northwest Indiana. In commemoration of the setting, the City of Hammond holds an annual exhibit regarding the film in November and December, including a statue recreating the scene where Ralphie's friend Flick freezes his tongue to a flagpole.

Director Bob Clark reportedly sent scouts to twenty cities before selecting Cleveland for exterior filming. Cleveland was chosen because of Higbee's Department Store in downtown Cleveland. Since Higbee's was exclusive to northeast Ohio, the department store referred to in Shepherd's book and the film is most likely Goldblatt's, located in downtown Hammond (with the Cam-Lan Chinese Restaurant three doors down on Sibley Avenue). Until they connected with Higbee's, location scouts had been unsuccessful in finding a department store that was willing to be part of the film. Higbee's vice president Bruce Campbell agreed to take part in the project on the condition he be allowed to edit the script for cursing. Ultimately, Higbee's was the stage for three scenes in the film:

- The opening scene in which Ralphie first spies the Red Ryder BB Gun in the store's Christmas window display. Higbee's was known for its elaborate, child-centered Christmas themes and decorations, with Santa Claus as the centerpiece.
- The parade scene, filmed just outside Higbee's on Public Square. The parade was filmed late at night (3 a.m.) because during the daytime the newer Erieview Tower and Federal Building were visible from the Public Square, as was the BP Tower, which was under construction at the time.
- Ralphie and Randy's visit to see Santa, which was filmed inside Higbee's. The store kept the Santa slide that was made for the film and used it for several years after the film's release. Higbee's became Dillard's in 1992 and closed permanently in 2002.

In addition to the scenes involving Higbee's, the exterior shots (and select interior shots where Ralphie lived, including the opening of the leg lamp) of the house and neighborhood, were filmed in the Tremont section of Cleveland's West Side. The house used as the Parker home in these scenes has been restored, reconfigured inside to match the soundstage interiors, and opened to the public as "A Christmas Story House". Appropriately, the fictional boyhood home of Ralphie Parker is on Cleveland Street, the name of the actual street where Shepherd grew up.

Several other locations were used. The school scenes were shot at the Victoria School in St. Catharines, Ontario. The Christmas tree-purchasing scene was filmed in Toronto, Ontario, as was the sound stage filming of interior shots of the Parker home. The "...only I didn't say fudge" scene was filmed at the foot of Cherry Street in Toronto; several lake freighters are visible in the background spending the winter at Toronto's port, which lends authenticity to the time of year when the film was produced.

In 2008, two Canadian fans released a documentary that visits every location. Their film, Road Trip for Ralphie, was shot over two years and includes footage of the filmmakers saving Miss Shields' blackboard from the garbage bin on the day the old Victoria School was gutted for renovation, discovering the antique fire truck that saved Flick, locating original costumes from the film, and tracking down the location of the film's Chop Suey Palace in Toronto.

=== Red Ryder BB Gun ===
The "Red Ryder" model BB Gun was manufactured in Plymouth, Michigan, by Daisy, beginning in 1938; it was never manufactured in the exact configuration mentioned in the film. The Daisy "Buck Jones" model did have a compass and a sundial in the stock, but these features were not included in the Red Ryder model. The compass and sundial were placed on Ralphie's BB gun, but on the opposite side of the stock because Peter Billingsley was left-handed. The commercial success of the film, most notably following holiday broadcasts, saw massive sale spikes in the Red Ryder BB gun due to its central role in the film's plot. Daisy Outdoor Products, the manufacturer of the gun, reported that demand heightened during the Christmas season, as it positioned the gun as a cultural icon and "Holy Grail" gift, with the film driving annual surges in air rifle purchases.

=== Dating the story ===
Director Bob Clark stated in the film's DVD commentary that both he and author Shepherd wished for the film to be seen as "amorphously late-'30s, early-'40s". A specific year is never explicitly mentioned in the film, with the most explicit references being a December 1939 calendar seen in one scene and the 1940 date on Ralphie's (authentic) Little Orphan Annie decoder ring, the last year the program was associated with Ovaltine and Pierre Andre before they moved on to Captain Midnight. While the Lionel streamline model passenger train in Higbee's window is a prewar item, the freight train in the same window is of postwar manufacture; the display also shows characters from the film Snow White and the Seven Dwarfs, which had been released in the United States in early 1938, the same year Red Ryder had made his debut in the comics. Much of the Bing Crosby soundtrack consisted of material recorded after World War II, including the 1947 hit version of "Santa Claus Is Comin' to Town" (though multiple other versions were already popular by the late 1930s) and "It's Beginning to Look a Lot Like Christmas," which would not be written until 1951. The Look magazine that Ralphie hides the Red Ryder ad in is the December 1937 cover with Shirley Temple and Santa. The parade in front of Higbee's features characters from MGM's version of The Wizard of Oz, which was released in 1939, and the war, which the United States entered in December 1941, is never mentioned. The "Old Man's" treasured Oldsmobile 6 is a 1937 Oldsmobile F-Series Touring Sedan. Although the director and author have said that the year has been obfuscated, some sources, including The New York Times and CBS News, have dated the film to 1940 or the early 1940s.

The real Shepherd was several years older than Ralphie; Shepherd was intentionally dishonest about many of the details of his own life and regularly obscured the line between fact and fiction in his writings. A teacher called "Miss Shields" was Shepherd's second-grade teacher at Warren G. Harding Elementary School in 1928. By 1939, Shepherd had already graduated from high school.

== Release ==
=== Box office ===
Initially overlooked as a sleeper film, A Christmas Story was released a week before Thanksgiving 1983 to moderate success, earning about $2 million in its first weekend.

By Christmas 1983, the film was no longer playing at most venues but remained in about a hundred theatres until January 1984. Gross earnings were just over $19.2 million. In December 1984, the film was re-released for a brief second theatrical run, coinciding with its home video release. Writer Glenn Lovell of Knight Ridder noted that after a year had passed, the film had "caught on with critics and the public", and rather than unload the film to cable television, MGM saw enough interest budding for a second run during the holiday season - this time much closer to and through the week of Christmas.

=== Critical response ===
Film critics generally supported the film. Leonard Maltin proclaimed it "a top screen comedy". Gene Siskel gave it 3 1/2 stars, calling it a "delightful motion picture", with "delightful characters and performances", but opined that it was "doomed to box office failure" for being released too early in the holiday season. Roger Ebert initially gave the film three stars out of four, but later awarded the film four stars and added the film to his "Great Movies" list. He suggested that the film only experienced modest success because holiday-themed films were not popular at the time. Vincent Canby's mostly negative The New York Times review complained that "the movie's big comic pieces tend only to be exceedingly busy. Though Mr. Billingsley, Mr. Gavin [sic], Miss Dillon and the actress who plays Ralphie's school teacher (Tedde Moore) are all very able, they are less funny than actors in a television situation comedy".

Over the years, the film's critical reputation has grown considerably and it is regarded by some as one of the best films of 1983. By the late 1980s, it was already considered a classic. Based on 62 reviews on Rotten Tomatoes, the film has an overall approval rating from critics of 87%. The site's consensus reads: "Both warmly nostalgic and darkly humorous, A Christmas Story deserves its status as a holiday perennial." On Metacritic, the film has a score of 77 out of 100, based on 16 critics, indicating "generally favorable" reviews. In his Movie Guide, Leonard Maltin awarded the film a four-star rating, calling the film "delightful" and "truly funny for kids and grown-ups alike" with "wonderful period flavor". In his book Have Yourself a Movie Little Christmas, critic Alonso Duralde lists A Christmas Story in his chapter of "Christmas Classics".

=== Accolades ===
In Canada, the film would go on to win two categories in the 5th Genie Awards, for Director Bob Clark and Best Original Screenplay for the work of Leigh Brown, Bob Clark and Jean Shepherd.

== Post-release ==
=== Broadcasting ===
==== Television ====
The film first aired on television on premium cable networks The Movie Channel, HBO, and Showtime, as early as December 1985, followed by Cinemax in 1986. It never aired on a major network: NBC had no space on its holiday schedule, CBS rejected the film as too dark, and ABC said it had never been offered to them. It was instead syndicated to local stations in 1986–1987, and the film quickly began to attract a following. On December 16, 1987, the film premiered on SuperStation WTBS. In 1989 and 1990, TBS Superstation showed it on Thanksgiving night, while in 1991 and 1992, they aired it the night after.

Since the mid-1990s, the film has aired increasingly on both TBS and TNT throughout the holiday season annually. Turner Classic Movies has also aired the film many times, as has The CW in recent years. The rerunning of A Christmas Story on television made Shepherd wealthier than anything he had done for television, even before the day-long marathons began. He contrasted the constant reruns of the film with the ephemeral nature of his teleplays, which were seen once and then never again. He initially vowed never to work in television again once A Christmas Story became a perennial hit (both because of this phenomenon and a previous bad experience a decade prior with The Phantom of the Open Hearth); he reconsidered a few years later, noting the success of the film had allowed him more leverage to gain higher rights fees.

In 2025, Warner Bros. Discovery licensed the film to AMC as part of its Best Christmas Ever block; the license covers one single, early Sunday morning graveyard slot airing of the film. It also added an airing of the film on HGTV to fill time slots vacated when the network cancelled much of its original programming earlier in the year.

==== 24 Hours of A Christmas Story ====
Due to the increasing popularity of the film, in 1997, TNT began airing a 24-hour marathon dubbed "24 Hours of A Christmas Story", consisting of twelve consecutive showings of the film running from 8:00 p.m. Eastern Time on Christmas Eve until 8:00 p.m. on Christmas Day. This was in addition to various other airings on the network earlier in the month of December. In 2004, after TNT switched to a predominantly drama-centered programming format, sister network TBS, under its comedy-based "Very Funny" moniker, took over carriage of the marathon. Clark stated that, in 2002, an estimated 38.4 million people tuned into the marathon at one point or another, nearly one sixth of the country. TBS reported 45.4 million viewers in 2005, and 45.5 million in 2006. In 2007, new all-time ratings records were set, with the highest single showing (8:00 p.m. Christmas Eve) drawing 4.4 million viewers. Viewership increased again in 2008, with the 8:00 p.m. airing on Christmas Eve drawing 4.5 million viewers, the 10:00 p.m. airing drawing 4.3 million, and total viewership topping at 54.4 million. As of 2009, the film had been shown 250 times on the Turner family of networks.

In 2007, the marathon continued, and the original tradition was revived. TNT also aired the film twice the Sunday of Thanksgiving weekend (November 25). In 2009, the 24-hour marathon continued on TBS, for the 13th overall year, starting at 8:00 p.m. ET on Christmas Eve.

In 2009, the film aired on TBS during a 24-hour marathon on Christmas Eve. The first viewing at 8:00 p.m. ET on December 24 earned a 1.6 rating (18–49) and beat the major broadcast networks (NBC, ABC, CBS, and Fox). In 2010, the marathon averaged 3 million viewers, up 2% from the previous year, ranking TBS as the top cable network for the 24-hour period. The 10:00 a.m. airing on December 25 was seen by 4.4 million viewers, and the 8:00 p.m. airing on December 24 was close behind with 4.3 million viewers. The marathons in 2011 and 2012 continued to see increases in ratings.

Beginning with the 2014 edition of the marathon, Turner elected to simulcast it on both TNT and TBS, marking the first time since 2003 that TNT aired it as well as the first time the marathon was aired on multiple networks. The two networks staggered their airings one hour apart, with the TBS marathon beginning at 8:00 p.m. ET and the TNT marathon beginning at 9:00 p.m. ET. Both networks have run 24-hour marathons with the one-hour offset format from 2014 annually, making it a new tradition for both TBS and TNT networks. For 2019, a majority of the most-watched programs—13 out of the top 25—broadcast on cable Christmas Day were A Christmas Story.

In 2024, TBS aired the film in early December as part of their Dinner and a Movie series, this in addition to the marathon. Hosts Jason Biggs and Jenny Mollen were joined by Zack Ward.

=== Home media ===
- Betamax — 1984
- VHS cardboard sleeve box — 1984, 1988, 1993, 1994, 1995 ("MGM/UA Family Entertainment" label), 1999 ("Warner Bros. Family Entertainment" label)
- VHS plastic clamshell case — 1995, 1998 ("MGM Family Entertainment" label), 1999 ("Warner Bros. Family Entertainment" label)
- LaserDisc — 1985: Pan and scan
- LaserDisc — 1993: Deluxe Letterbox Edition
- DVD — 1997: Fullscreen, includes the original theatrical trailer (reissued by Warner Home Video in 1999).
- DVD — 2003: 20th Anniversary 2-Disc Special Edition DVD: anamorphic widescreen and letterboxed fullscreen; it includes cast interviews, audio commentary, and featurettes.
- HD DVD — 2006
- Blu-ray — 2006
- DVD — 2008, Ultimate Collector's Edition: Metal tin case features the same 2003 two-disc special edition, but includes special memorabilia.
- Blu-ray — 2008, Ultimate Collector's Edition: Metal tin which features the same 2006 Blu-ray Disc, but also includes a strand of Leg Lamp Christmas lights.
- Blu-ray — 2013, 30th Anniversary Edition: Steelbook with Blu-ray in 1080p (like the previous Blu-ray and HD-DVD) with a DTS-HD Master Audio mono track (whereas the previous releases had Dolby Digital mono), and more special features than the previous Blu-ray and HD-DVD editions.
- Ultra HD Blu-ray — 2022

== Legacy ==
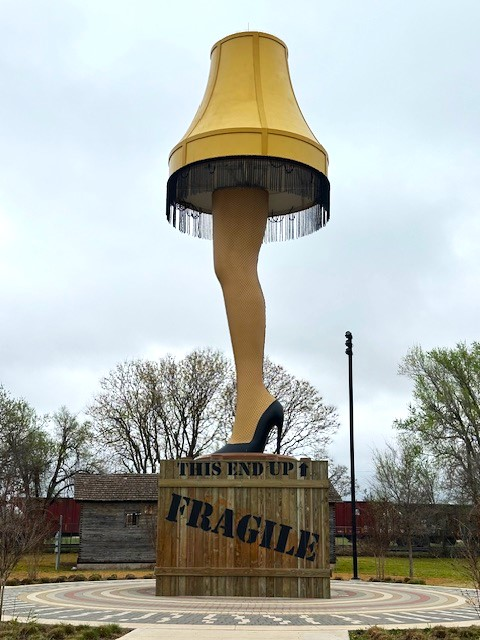
40-foot tall Leg lamp statue in Chickasha, Oklahoma, March 2025

Due to television airings and home video release, A Christmas Story has become widely popular and is now an annual Christmas special. The film was produced and released by Metro-Goldwyn-Mayer (MGM). The rights to the film were acquired by Turner Entertainment Co. after Ted Turner's purchase of MGM's pre-1986 film library. Subsequently, Time Warner purchased Turner Entertainment in 1996 and currently holds rights to the film as Warner Bros. Discovery (WBD). On December 24, 2007, AOL ranked the film their #1 Christmas film of all time. IGN ranked the film the top holiday-themed film of all time. In 2012, a Marist Poll named the film the favorite holiday film in the US. In 2019, a poll commissioned by Tubitv and conducted by Onepoll also ranked the film Best Holiday Movie Ever. A Christmas Story received a nomination for Best Digital – Comedy, and won Best Digital – Animation/Family at the 2023 Golden Trailer Awards.

=== Subsequent screen adaptations and sequels ===
The PBS series American Playhouse produced two subsequent television film adaptations featuring the same characters, also with Shepherd narrating: The Star-Crossed Romance of Josephine Cosnowski and Ollie Hopnoodle's Haven of Bliss. The latter of these was set in the early 1950s with a now-teenaged Ralphie and his friends and family. Shepherd had previously created The Phantom of the Open Hearth and The Great American Fourth of July and Other Disasters for the same network.

A theatrical sequel involving Ralphie and his family, titled It Runs in the Family, was made in 1994. With the exceptions of Tedde Moore as Miss Shields (Ralphie's teacher) and Jean Shepherd as the narrator (the voice of the adult Ralphie), it features an entirely different cast. It received a limited release before being retitled My Summer Story for home video and television release.

A Christmas Story 2 is a direct sequel to the film, which ignores the references and events of My Summer Story and was released direct-to-video in 2012 and directed by Brian Levant. It was filmed in New Westminster, British Columbia, Canada. The film received generally negative reviews from critics.

Another sequel to the film, which ignores all previous sequels and is entitled A Christmas Story Christmas, was released in 2022. The film is directed by The Christmas Chronicles director Clay Kaytis and written by The Mule writer Nick Schenk (who is also executive producer of the film). Peter Billingsley reprised his role as Ralphie Parker, in addition serving as the film's producer. The film was released via streaming on HBO Max by Warner Bros. Discovery Global Streaming & Interactive Entertainment. It takes place in the 1970s following an adult Ralphie catching up with his old childhood friends. Ian Petrella, Scott Schwartz, R. D. Robb, and Zack Ward reprised their roles of Randy Parker, Flick, Schwartz, and Scut Farkus, respectively. Erinn Hayes, River Drosche, and Julianna Layne played Ralphie's wife and his kids while Julie Hagerty played Mrs. Parker in a role originated by Melinda Dillon (who would die less than two months after the film was released in 2023) in the original film. The film is dedicated to the memory of Darren McGavin (who played "The Old Man" in the original film), who died on February 25, 2006. The film received generally positive reviews from critics.

In December 2024, Peter Billingsley teased the possibility of another film, stating it would probably happen in 20 years and would focus on an older Ralphie and his relationship with his son.

==== Stage adaptations ====
In 2000, a stage play adaptation of A Christmas Story was written by Philip Grecian.

In November 2012, A Christmas Story: The Musical, based on the film, opened on Broadway. Written by Benj Pasek and Justin Paul (music and lyrics) and Joseph Robinette (book), the musical opened to positive reviews. The run ended on December 30 the same year. The musical was directed by John Rando with choreography by Warren Carlyle and featured Dan Lauria as Jean Shepherd. The musical received Tony Award nominations for Best Musical, Best Book of a Musical (Robinette), and Best Original Score (Music or Lyrics) Written for the Theatre.

The musical was then adapted for television as the three hour A Christmas Story Live!, which aired on the Fox network in the United States on December 17, 2017. Reviews were mixed; on Rotten Tomatoes, the production received a 46% rating based on 13 critics' reviews.

=== Lawsuit ===
In August 2011, Zack Ward, who played Scut Farkus in the film, sued Warner Bros. and Enesco over merchandising for the film after the company authorized a figure resembling his character from the film without his permission. It was revealed that when he signed on to play that character, he did not receive any merchandising rights because of a mishap with his contract. The lawsuit was dropped in January 2012 after Warner Bros. revealed that the figurine showed a "generic face" that has been used on them since 2006 and that the statute of limitations had run out.

In December 2012, Ward sued Warner Bros. again over his image after attending the annual Christmas Story charity fundraiser convention in Cleveland in November 2010, where a fan handed him a Christmas Story board game, playing cards, and calendar showing his face. The lawsuit was settled three days later.

== See also ==
- List of Christmas films
- Parker Family Saga (franchise)

== Bibliography ==
- Gaines, Caseen (October 2013). A Christmas Story: Behind the Scenes of a Holiday Classic. ECW Press. ISBN 9781770411401.
