= A Christmas Story Christmas =

2022 film by Clay Kaytis

- Release poster
- Directed by: Clay Kaytis
- Screenplay by: Nick Schenk; Clay Kaytis
- Story by: Nick Schenk; Peter Billingsley
- Based on: In God We Trust: All Others Pay Cash by Jean Shepherd
- Produced by: Irwin Zwilling; Marc Toberoff; Cale Boyter; Jay Ashenfelter; Peter Billingsley; Vince Vaughn
- Starring: Peter Billingsley; Erinn Hayes; Scott Schwartz; R. D. Robb; Zack Ward; Julie Hagerty
- Cinematography: Matthew Clark
- Edited by: David Walsh Heinz
- Music by: Jeff Morrow
- Production companies: Warner Bros. Pictures; Legendary Pictures; Wild West Picture Show Productions; Toberoff Productions; Turner Entertainment
- Distributed by: HBO Max
- Release date: November 17, 2022
- Running time: 98 minutes
- Country: United States
- Language: English

A Christmas Story Christmas is a 2022 American Christmas comedy film directed by Clay Kaytis from a script by Nick Schenk. It is a direct sequel to the 1983 film A Christmas Story, ignoring the events of the prior sequels My Summer Story (1994) and A Christmas Story 2 (2012). Peter Billingsley reprises his role as Ralphie Parker alongside Ian Petrella, Scott Schwartz, R. D. Robb, and Zack Ward. Additionally Erinn Hayes, River Drosche, and Julianna Layne play Ralphie's wife and children, with Julie Hagerty in the role of Mrs. Parker. The film follows Ralphie Parker, now an adult and a struggling novelist, who returns to his childhood home in Hohman, Indiana in 1973 following the death of his father, the Old Man, to deliver a magical Christmas for his own family. Principal photography began in late February 2022 in Hungary and Bulgaria. A Christmas Story Christmas was released in the United States on November 17, 2022, by Warner Bros. Pictures on HBO Max. The film received generally positive reviews from critics.

== Plot ==
In December 1973, 33 years after A Christmas Story, 42-year-old Ralph Parker lives in Chicago with his wife, Sandy, and two young children, Mark and Julie. Ralph has been taking the year off from his job to write his first novel, but its excessive length leads multiple publishers to reject it. Mrs. Parker calls to tell Ralph that his father, "the Old Man", has died, and the grief-stricken family makes its way to Hohman, Indiana, to be with her. She gives Ralph two tasks: write his father's obituary and take up his mantle of making Christmas special for the family.

Ralph's children befriend one of the Bumpus kids next door and have their snowman smashed by two bullies on a snowmobile. Ralph reunites with Flick, who now owns his father's old tavern, and Schwartz, who still lives with his mother and has run up a large tab at Flick's. While leaving the house to go ice skating, Sandy slips and sprains her ankle.

As Christmas Eve approaches, the family goes to Higbee's, where Ralph miraculously buys everything Mark and Julie asked for while the children speak to the store's Santa. On the way back, Ralph's car overheats, and Ralph accidentally hits Julie in the eye during an impromptu snowball fight. After Julie receives a temporary eyepatch at the hospital, the family discovers their car was burglarized in the hospital parking lot; the presents are gone, and there is little money left to replace them.

Back at Flick's, Flick offers to forgive Schwartz's tab if he sleds off a giant ramp. Schwartz manages to complete the stunt, but Mark breaks his arm sledding down the nearby hill afterwards. After Ralph is rejected by his final prospective publisher, he laments his difficulties but is encouraged by his mother and Sandy. Remembering his favorite Christmas with his father inspires Ralph to write a long article instead of a standard obituary; however, he leaves it on the desk, needing to prepare for Christmas Day. Mark and Julie get back at their bullies by building a snowman over a tree stump so that the snowmobile crashes.

On Christmas Eve night, the star falls off the Parkers' tree and breaks, upsetting Julie. Frustrated, Ralph ignores objections from his wife and mother and goes out to find a new star. All the local businesses are already closed, so Ralph breaks into Flick's tavern to "borrow" the star from the tree. On his way out, he is apprehended by his childhood bully Scut Farkus, now a Hohman police officer. Ralph is terrified of what Scut might do to him, but Scut brings him home, saying he owes Ralph because their childhood fight set him on a better path in life.

Mrs. Parker goes into the basement to change a fuse and finds several thoughtfully-picked, pre-wrapped gifts, which the Old Man had bought shortly before his death. On Christmas morning, the family is delighted to open them along with their other presents. Ralph is confused by compliments he receives about his piece in the newspaper, and Sandy reveals she found the obituary manuscript and took it to the local paper because of its high quality. The phone rings, and Ralph is offered a new job as a syndicated columnist, fulfilling his dream of becoming a full-time writer. Much of the town comes to the Parker house for Christmas dinner; after dinner concludes, the core family asks Ralph to read them his story about the Old Man. Ralph takes a seat in his father's armchair and begins reading, and his narration slowly transitions into Jean Shepherd's opening narration from the first film.

== Cast ==
- Peter Billingsley as Ralph "Ralphie" Parker
- Erinn Hayes as Sandy Parker, Ralph's wife
- Julie Hagerty as Mrs. Parker, Ralph's mother
- Ian Petrella as Randy Parker, Ralph's brother
- Scott Schwartz as Flick, one of Ralph's childhood friends
- R. D. Robb as Schwartz, one of Ralph's childhood friends
- Zack Ward as Officer Scut Farkus, Ralph's former childhood bully
- River Drosche as Mark Parker, Ralph's son
- Julianna Layne as Julie Parker, Ralph's daughter
- Cailean and Alistair Galloway as the Snowmobile Riders, Scut's twin sons
- Yano Anaya as Grover Dill, Ralph's childhood bully (in Ralph's imagination)
- Darren McGavin as "The Old Man" (archival audio from 1983 feature)

== Production ==
In January 2022, Warner Bros. Pictures and Legendary Pictures announced that a legacy sequel to A Christmas Story was in development with a script from Nick Schenk who also serves as executive producer. Clay Kaytis was hired to direct. The film is dedicated to Darren McGavin (who played "The Old Man" in the original film), who died on February 25, 2006. The staff acquired option rights to much of original author Jean Shepherd's bibliography for use in the film, working several quotes from Shepherd's books into the finished script. Peter Billingsley had conceived the film as both a sequel to and an origin story for the original film.

Shortly after its official announcement of the film, Billingsley was cast to reprise his role as Ralphie Parker, and hired as a producer alongside Vince Vaughn. Melinda Dillon, who had played Ralphie's mom in the original film, gave Billingsley her support for the project but was unable to reprise the role (she would die shortly after A Christmas Story Christmas was released); Julie Hagerty assumed the role in Dillon's stead. In February, Ian Petrella, Scott Schwartz, R. D. Robb, Zack Ward, and Yano Anaya were cast to reprise their roles as Randy Parker, Flick, Schwartz, Scut Farkus, and Grover Dill, respectively. Billingsley noted that all of them had remained friends since making the original film and were all eager to reprise their roles. In the same month, Erinn Hayes, River Drosche, and Julianna Layne were cast as Ralphie's wife, Sandy Parker and his kids, Mark and Julie Parker, respectively. Tedde Moore was asked to reprise her role as Miss Shields from the original film, but declined; Moore by this point was largely incapacitated by multiple sclerosis and had not acted since 2017.

Principal photography began in late February 2022 in Hungary and Bulgaria and wrapped in April 2022. Hungary served as a stand-in for the town of Hohman, Indiana with Bulgaria hosting key interior and exterior shots. Addition scenes were also filmed in Cleveland, Ohio and Toronto, Ontario, Canada. Billingsley and the crew commissioned exact replicas of the house which was depicted in the original film and the neighborhood enhancing the authenticity of the film.

== Release ==
A Christmas Story Christmas was released in the United States on November 17, 2022, on HBO Max.

Since 2023, the film has since been incorporated into regular reruns on TBS and TNT's holiday program blocks, All I Watch for Christmas and Christmas Maximus, including the lead-out spot following the 24-hour marathon of A Christmas Story.

=== Marketing ===
The teaser trailer was released on October 17, 2022, which featured brief glimpses of actor Peter Billingsley as Ralphie Parker recreating iconic moments from the original while introducing his character's family in the film's 1973 setting. The full official trailer followed on November 1, 2022, which expanded on the film's nostalgic elements by showcasing returning characters of Flick and Schwartz, alongside new comedic scenarios involving Ralphie's quest to replicate his childhood Christmas for his own two children.

== Reception ==
=== Viewership data ===
Upon its streaming debut on HBO Max on November 17, 2022, A Christmas Story Christmas ranked in the #16 spot on the list of the most-watched Christmas movies in U.S. households from November 8 to December 11, 2022.

=== Critical response ===
On the review aggregator website Rotten Tomatoes, 79% of 48 critics' reviews are positive, with an average rating of 6.3/10. The website's consensus reads: "It isn't as much fun as an official Red Ryder carbine action, 200-shot, range model air rifle with a compass in the stock and this thing that tells time, but A Christmas Story Christmas remains a sequel worth celebrating." On Metacritic, the film has a weighted average score of 55 out of 100 based on reviews from 10 critics, indicating "mixed or average" reviews.

Owen Gleiberman of Variety appreciated the film's focus on early 1970's nostalgia and Ralphie's growth as a writer, praising it for its "mild and toasty" sentiment, while noting that while the film is still enjoyable, he felt that the story lacked the "rascally exuberance" of the original film. Frank Scheck of The Hollywood Reporter called the film a "sweet sequel" while praising the nostalgic callbacks and its family-oriented story despite being familiar, while noting that it is "forgettable" in parts, criticizing its formulaic elements that prioritize nostalgia for the original film over this film's fresh invention.

== See also ==
- List of Christmas films
