= My Summer Story =

1994 film by Bob Clark

- Theatrical release poster (under the original title, It Runs in the Family)
- Directed by: Bob Clark
- Screenplay by: Jean Shepherd; Leigh Brown; Bob Clark
- Based on: In God We Trust, All Others Pay Cash and Wanda Hickey's Night of Golden Memories and Other Disasters by Jean Shepherd
- Produced by: Rene Dupont
- Starring: Charles Grodin; Kieran Culkin; Mary Steenburgen
- Narrated by: Jean Shepherd
- Cinematography: Stephen M. Katz
- Edited by: Stan Cole
- Music by: Paul Zaza
- Distributed by: Metro-Goldwyn-Mayer
- Release date: September 23, 1994
- Running time: 85 minutes
- Country: United States
- Language: English
- Budget: $15 million
- Box office: $71,000

My Summer Story (originally released in theaters as It Runs in the Family) is a 1994 American comedy film directed by Bob Clark that serves as a sequel to his 1983 film A Christmas Story. Like the previous film, it is based on semi-autobiographical stories by Jean Shepherd, primarily from his book In God We Trust, All Others Pay Cash.

The opening makes direct reference to the events of A Christmas Story, and the ending narration strongly parallels it; production delays forced most of the characters to be recast. Charles Grodin stars as the Old Man (Mr. Parker), Mary Steenburgen plays Mrs. Parker, and Kieran Culkin is Ralphie Parker. Shepherd provides the narration, just as he had done for A Christmas Story.

My Summer Story was released by Metro-Goldwyn-Mayer on September 23, 1994. The film received mixed reviews and was a box office bomb, grossing $71,000 against a $15 million budget. Two sequels followed the film. The first, A Christmas Story 2, was released straight to DVD in 2012. The second, A Christmas Story Christmas, was released on HBO Max in 2022 and features most of the original cast from the original 1983 film returning.

== Plot ==
The film takes place in the summer of 1941, after the events of A Christmas Story, which took place in December 1940. It has several plotlines, one each for 10-year-old Ralphie Parker, his father, and his mother, followed by a recurring subplot involving him and his dad on a fishing trip, that proves frequently fruitless until a single night when all fish are caught. This also feeds a needless obsession in Ralphie's 7-year-old brother Randy, much to Mrs. Parker's nerve.

=== Ralphie's plot ===
Ralphie's plot for most of the film is to find a top tough enough to knock that of a bully's out of a chalk circle in a game of "Kill". Scut Farkus, the 13-year-old main bully, was demoted following the events of A Christmas Story, with a new head bully, Lug Ditka, taking his place and ruling over the school. Despite his firm standing, Ralphie's tops are always defeated by Lug's top Mariah, prompting Ralphie to look for outside sources that also backfire, such as a top bought from an Eastern shop that is painted with roses, giving Lug all the mocking material. During the Parker family's visit to the world's fair, Ralphie gets a top from a gypsy stand called "Wolf" just as powerful as Mariah, allowing Ralphie to challenge him again. At the climax of the challenge, both Mariah and Wolf end up disappearing into the sewer, never to be seen again; as a result, the game ends on a lose-lose draw.

=== Mrs. Parker's plot ===
Mrs. Parker's plot revolves around attempting to start a collection of celebrity dishes, one per each dish night, at the Orpheum Theatre run by Leopold Doppler. She acquires the first dish, a Ronald Colman gravy boat, though she accumulates more as Doppler announces the other dishes are unavailable due to 'misshipment'. The frustration of accumulating the gravy boats combined with the events throughout the film get Mrs. Parker over the edge, resulting with her throwing the gravy boat she won at the theater at Doppler's head. All other housewives, encouraged by Mrs. Parker's act, also start raining down the surplus gravy boats towards Doppler, enraged at the frustration and the apparent fraudulent scheme. Mrs. Parker is arrested for the act, though with a relieved smile on her face.

=== Mr. Parker's plot ===
Mr. Parker's plot revolves around his odds with the Parker's hillbilly neighbors, the Bumpuses (or Bumpi, as the Parkers tend to refer them in plural), especially due to their loud overplaying of hillbilly music, obnoxious behavior and the constant harassment on Mr. Parker by the Bumpuses' forty-three Bloodhounds named Big Red. The escalation turns into war when the Bumpuses inaugurate an outhouse bathroom, which Parker clearly perceives as a health code violation. When Mr. Parker attempts forcing the Bumpuses to demolish the outhouse, they respond by having Big Dickie, the largest of the Bumpus family, destroy their house's porch as a show of force. Parker attempts unsuccessfully to torment the Bumpuses with music, which they mistake for Parker calling a night party, prompting him to hurriedly escape to the fishing trip with Ralphie. Mr. Parker does a second attempt, this time with a sound effects record disk simulating a federal bust, but by the time he unleashes the sound disk, the Bumpuses have long moved away. Mr. Parker interprets this as a defeat, and the act earns the ire of the woken-up neighborhood, who strongly suggest to bring the Bumpuses back and be rid of Parker.

== Cast ==
- Charles Grodin as Mr. Parker
- Mary Steenburgen as Mrs. Parker
- Kieran Culkin as Ralph "Ralphie" Parker
  - Jean Shepherd as Ralph Parker/The Narrator
- Christian Culkin as Randy Parker
- Whit Hertford as "Lug" Ditka
- Chris Owen as "Scut" Farkus
- Geoffrey Wigdor as Flick
- David Zahorsky as Schwartz
- Tedde Moore as Miss Shields
- T.J. McInturff as Grover Dill
- Glenn Shadix as Leopold Doppler
- Roy Brocksmith as Mr. Winchell

== Production ==
Jean Shepherd had begun work on the film in 1989, after wrapping up production on the television film Ollie Hopnoodle's Haven of Bliss. He admitted making the sequel mainly as a money-making enterprise; when he saw the amount of royalties he was making off telecasts and re-releases of A Christmas Story compared to his television productions, he walked away from television and vowed to work almost exclusively on films. Because the cast of A Christmas Story had aged to the point where they no longer fit their roles, it was entirely recast, with the exception of Tedde Moore, who returns as Ralphie Parker (Kieran Culkin)'s teacher, Miss Shields.

Filming commenced on August 2, 1993, in Cleveland, Ohio and lasted for 10 weeks, wrapping in October 1993, with the shoot incorporating significant community involvement, with the city's residents recruited as extras to populate the film's 1940's period scenes, with the bustling Great Lakes Exposition recreated at the Key Tower plaza and the Palace Theatre.

== Reception ==
=== Box office ===
Released in few theaters, the film grossed under $71,000.

=== Critical response ===
The film received mixed reviews. Entertainment Weekly gave it a B+, noting that the film improves on A Christmas Story, with better pacing and better-defined characters, but found Shepherd's narration to be "oh-so-drolly exaggerated" and "condescending". Robert Butler at The Kansas City Star called it "a sequel worth seeing" which revisits the humor of the original.

Upon the release of the film on DVD in 2006, DVD Talk wrote that "My Summer Story is reasonably good", while criticizing the casting, but praising Shepherd's narration as "the film's saving grace". Christopher Null at MovieCritic.com referred to the film as a "lackluster sequel" with "little of the same charm" as A Christmas Story, and not "funny". A 2011 summary of best and worst movies filmed in Cleveland called the film a "dog", which "features none of the original cast" and "none of the original heart".

== Related works ==
Prior to the making of the theatrical film, PBS co-produced a series of TV movies based on the Parker family for American Playhouse including Ollie Hopnoodle's Haven of Bliss, The Great American Fourth of July and Other Disasters, The Star-Crossed Romance of Josephine Cosnowski and The Phantom of the Open Hearth.
