= Ian Petrella =

American actor

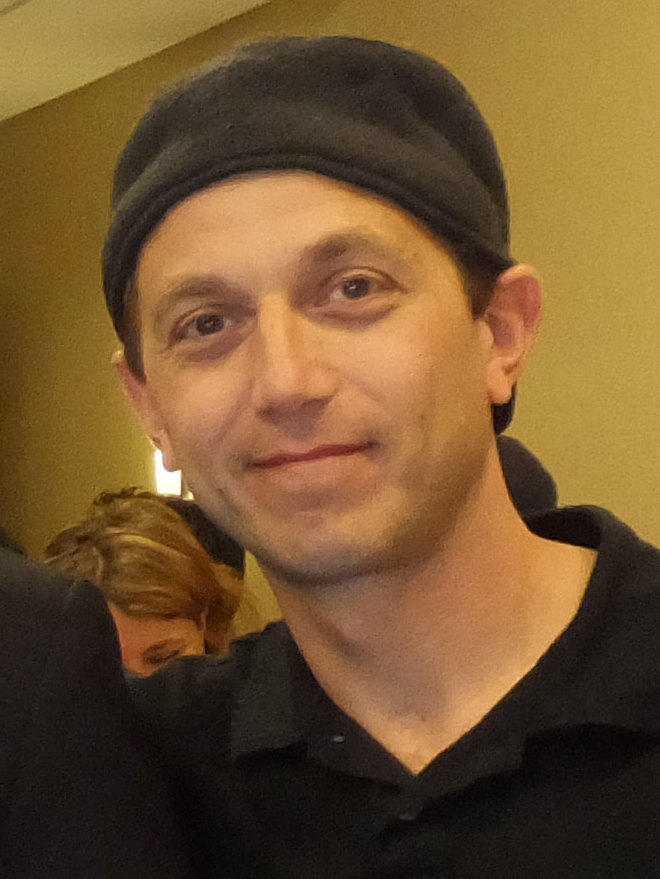
- Petrella in 2013
- Born: December 17, 1974 (age 51); Los Angeles, California, United States
- Occupations: Actor, puppeteer
- Years active: 1982–present

Ian Petrella (born December 17, 1974) is an American actor and puppeteer. He is best known for his role as Randy Parker in the 1983 film A Christmas Story, a role he reprised in the 2022 sequel A Christmas Story Christmas.

== Career ==
In 1983, Petrella played Randy Parker in A Christmas Story. He reprised the role in the 2022 sequel A Christmas Story Christmas.

From November 4, 2010, to the first week of January 2011, he served as a guest tour guide at the A Christmas Story House in Cleveland, Ohio.

== Personal life ==
Petrella currently resides in Cleveland, Ohio, working in animation and puppetry.

== Filmography ==
Year	Title	Role	Notes
1982	CHiPs	Little Boy	Episode: "Head Over Heels"
1983	A Christmas Story	Randy Parker	
1984	Crimes of Passion	Jimmy's Friend	
1986	Diff'rent Strokes	Alex	Episode: "Lifestyles of the Poor and Unknown"
1987	Who's the Boss?	Biff	Episode: "Mona"
1987	Mr. President	Wesley	Episode: "Meet the People"
1987	Once a Hero	Eugene Egan	Episode: "Once a Hero"
1987	Highway to Heaven	Big Kid	Episode: "I Was a Middle Aged Werewolf"
1987	My Sister Sam	Trick or Treater	Episode: "Who's Afraid of Virginia Schultz?"
1991	Beverly Hills, 90210	Kid	Episode: "Play It Again, David"
2006	Poster Boy	Chainsmoker	Short film
2008	The Untold Christmas Story	Himself	Video documentary
2009	Crafty	Kenny the Barkeeper	Episode: "Larry's Revenge"
2009	Clarkworld	Himself	
2011	NFL Holiday Spectacular	Host	
2012	The Cast of a Christmas Story: Where Are They Now?	Himself	TV movie
2013	Christmas in Ohio: A Christmas Story House	Himself	Video short
2013	Good Morning America	Himself	1 episode
2015	Quarter Bin	Himself	
2015	Entertainment Tonight	Himself	1 episode
2022	A Christmas Story Christmas	Randy Parker	
2023	Xmas	Boss Randy	Short film
