= The Star-Crossed Romance of Josephine Cosnowski =

- Official film logo
- Directed by: Fred Barzyk
- Written by: Jean Shepherd
- Based on: In God We Trust: All Others Pay Cash by Jean Shepherd
- Produced by: Olvia Tappan
- Starring: Pete Kowanko; George Coe; Barbara Bolton; Jay Ine; Jean Shepherd
- Cinematography: Peter Hoving
- Edited by: Dick Bartlett
- Music by: David Amram
- Production companies: American Playhouse; Public Broadcasting System
- Distributed by: Public Broadcasting System (PBS)
- Release date: February 11, 1985
- Running time: 56 minutes
- Country: United States
- Language: English

The Star-Crossed Romance of Josephine Cosnowski is an American made-for-television family-comedy film, directed by Fred Barzyk, with a script written by Jean Shepherd. Produced by Olvia Tappan, the film is the fourth installment in the Ralph Parker franchise. Based on Shepherd's book In God We Trust: All Others Pay Cash and similar to all the other Parker Family films, the film depicts fictionalized events from his real-life childhood.

Released exclusively as it aired on American Playhouse, season four, episode nine, the film was met with positive critical reception, with praise directed at the script, returning cast, and its Thanksgiving setting.

== Synopsis ==
A middle-aged Ralph Parker introduces the film as the character is going to a movie in theaters directed by a Polish director, which reminds him of a memory from his past. Set during the late-1940s to early-1950s America, high school aged Ralph Parker prepares for Thanksgiving celebrations with his family. His father, Mr. Parker, decides that he wants to buy a new family vehicle and starts the processes of purchasing a yellow colored Buick, while Ralph's younger brother Randy reluctantly practices for his starring role as a turkey in the school Thanksgiving Day play.

As the holiday approaches, a Polish family moves in. With the excitement of new next-door neighbors, Ralph discovers that the daughter is the girl of his dreams. He begins his first serious relationship. The pair soon discover that their courtship may prove more difficult to manage than necessary.

== Cast ==
- Pete Kowanko as Ralph "Ralphie" Parker
  - Jean Shepherd as Ralph Parker/the Narrator
- George Coe as Mr. Parker
- Barbara Bolton as Mrs. Parker
- Jay Ine as Randy Parker
- William Lampley as Flick
- Jeff Yonis as Schwartz
- Katherine Kamhi as Josephine "Josie" Cosnowski
- Armen Garo as Stosh "Bubba" Cosnowski
- James T. Lahiff as Alex "Killer" Cosnowski
- William B. Lynch as Mr. Cosnowski
- Joan Tolentino as Mrs. Cosnowski
- Frank Toste C.S.C. as Father Casmir

== Release ==
The Star-Crossed Romance of Josephine Cosnowski was released on February 11, 1985, during an episode of American Playhouse.

== Sequels ==
The film is a part of a larger franchise of films, an adaptation for stage, and a television broadcast adaptation of that play. The film's direct follow-up, Ollie Hopnoodle's Haven of Bliss, was released in 1988.
