= R. D. Robb =

American actor (born 1972)

- Born: March 31, 1972 (age 54); Philadelphia, Pennsylvania, U.S.
- Occupation: Actor
- Years active: 1983–present

R. D. Robb (born March 31, 1972) is an American actor who appeared as Schwartz in the 1983 film A Christmas Story and its 2022 sequel A Christmas Story Christmas. He was nominated for an Edda Award in 2005. In 2001, he co-wrote and directed the film Don's Plum.

== Acting ==
Robb has over 20 acting credits, the last of which were voice acting work for the Jade Empire video game. Other credits include roles in Matilda and The Brady Bunch Movie. In 2017, he played a headshot photographer in an episode of The Goldbergs, an episode which referred to his success as a child actor in A Christmas Story and his mother's job as an acting manager as central to the plot. In 2022, Robb reprised his role as Schwartz in the A Christmas Story sequel A Christmas Story Christmas for Warner Bros. Pictures and HBO Max.

=== Don's Plum ===
In 1995, Robb directed a film called Don's Plum that starred then up-and-coming actors Leonardo DiCaprio and Tobey Maguire. Supposedly DiCaprio and Maguire agreed to star in the film if the film was never released in the United States; Robb disputed this claim. When Robb met with distributors, DiCaprio and Maguire sued. The two sides settled out of court, agreeing to never show the film in the United States or Canada.

== Filmography ==
=== Film ===
| Year | Title | Role | Notes |
|---|---|---|---|
| 1983 | A Christmas Story | Schwartz | |
| 1995 | The Brady Bunch Movie | Charlie Anderson | |
| 1996 | Matilda | Roy | |
| 1997 | Eight Days a Week | Matt | |
| 1998 | Snapped | Ray | |
| 1998 | Falling Sky | C.C. | |
| 1999 | Final Rinse | Bill | |
| 2001 | Boys Klub | Fooley | |
| 2022 | A Christmas Story Christmas | Schwartz | |

=== Television ===
| Year | Title | Role | Notes |
|---|---|---|---|
| 1984 | Little Arliss | Arliss Coates | TV movie |
| 1985 | NBC Special Treat | Martin Frommer | Episode: "Out of Time" |
| 1985 | Highway to Heaven | Little Devil | Episode: "The Devil and Jonathan Smith" |
| 1985 | He-Man & She-Ra: A Christmas Special | Miguel | voice role, TV special |
| 1994 | The Mommies | Delivery guy | Episode: "Five Minutes Apart" |
| 1994 | ABC Afterschool Specials | Johnny | Episode: "Boys Will Be Boys" |
| 1995 | CBS Schoolbreak Special | Michael | Episode: "Kids Killing Kids" |
| 1995 | ER | Mike | Episode: "The Secret Sharer" |
| 1996 | Unhappily Ever After | Bernie | Episode: "Rock and Roll" |
| 2001 | Touched by an Angel | Paul Slocum | Episode: "Holy of Holies" |
| 2017 | The Goldbergs | Paul Sirochman | Episode: "So Swayze It's Crazy" |
