= A Christmas Story House =

Attraction and museum in Cleveland, Ohio, U.S.

Coordinates: 41°28′7.40″N 81°41′14.72″W

House From A Christmas Story
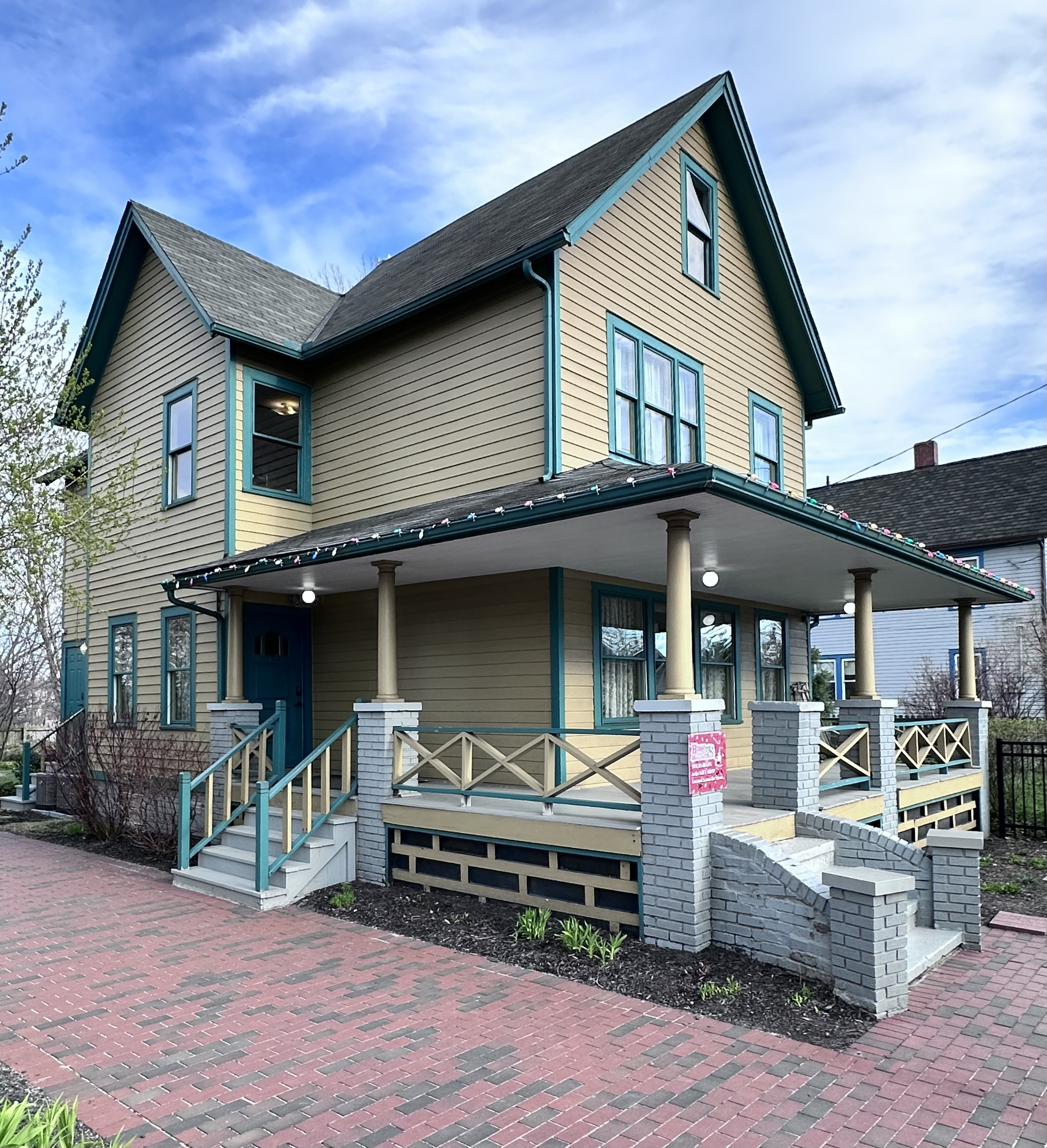
- Established: 2006 (House built in 1895, though some accounts date back as early as 1870)
- Location: 3159 W 11th St. Cleveland, Ohio 44109; United States
- Website: housefromachristmasstory.com

The House from A Christmas Story (also known as The A Christmas Story House) is an attraction and museum in the Tremont neighborhood of Cleveland, Ohio. The 19th-century Victorian house, which was used in the exterior and some interior scenes of Ralphie Parker's house in the 1983 film A Christmas Story, was purchased by a private developer in 2004 and has been restored and renovated to appear as it did in the film both inside and outside. The museum is part of a complex of four buildings devoted to the film and is open to the public year round.

The house is a designated Cleveland Municipal Landmark.

== History ==
=== Production ===
The screenplay for A Christmas Story is based on material from author Jean Shepherd's collection of short stories, In God We Trust, All Others Pay Cash. The house that appears in the film is located at 3159 W 11th Street, Cleveland, Ohio. For the film adaptation of these stories, director Bob Clark reportedly sent scouts to twenty cities before selecting Cleveland for exterior filming. Cleveland was chosen because of Higbee's Department Store. Vice-president Bruce Campbell took on the project hoping to get a boost in sales from the attention the filming would create. Higbee's is ultimately featured in three scenes in the film. Appropriately, the fictional boyhood home of Ralphie Parker is on Cleveland Street, the name of the actual street where Shepherd grew up. The exterior shots and some interior shots of the house and neighborhood where Ralphie lives were filmed in the Tremont section of Cleveland's West Side. Producers chose the home because of its proximity to downtown and it bordered the Cuyahoga River Valley offering views of the steel mills in the valley.

The 2022 sequel A Christmas Story Christmas was filmed in Eastern Europe and thus replicas of the house and others in the neighborhood were constructed there for filming. The current owners of the building declined access to the production to scan the house and surrounding neighborhood for reference purposes.

=== Restoration and reconfiguration ===
In December 2004, Brian Jones, a San Diego entrepreneur and fan of the film since childhood, bought the house on eBay for $150,000. Jones used revenue from his business, the Red Rider Leg Lamp Company, which manufactures replicas of the "major award" Ralphie's father won in the film, for the down payment. The previous owners had reconfigured the house, installing modern windows and covering the original wood siding with blue vinyl. Watching the movie frame by frame, Jones drew detailed plans of the interiors, which had originally been filmed on a Toronto sound stage, and spent $240,000 to gut the structure, reconfigure it to a single-family dwelling, transform it into a near-replica of the movie set, and restore the exterior to its appearance in the film.

==== Museum of A Christmas Story ====
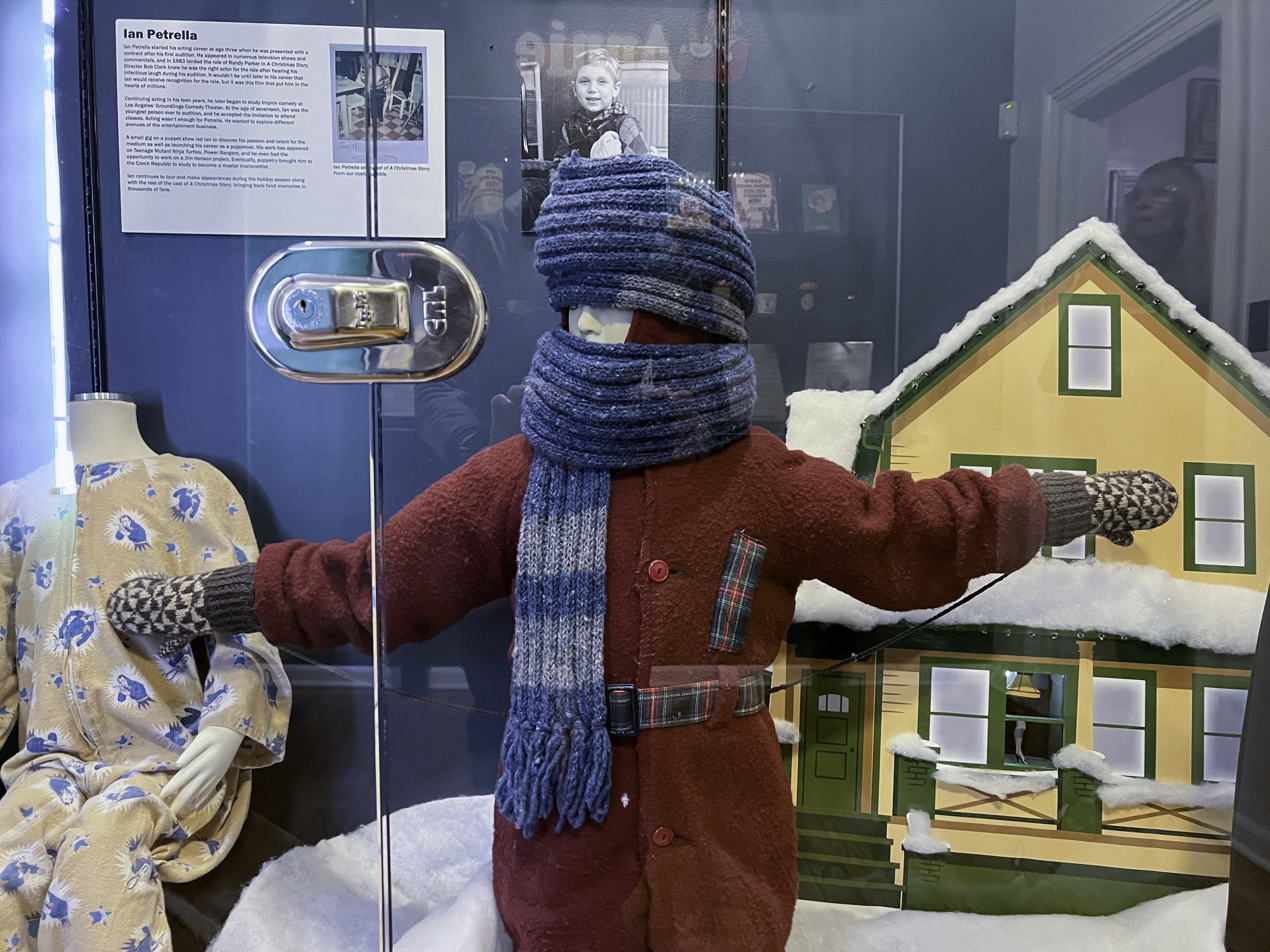
Randy's snowsuit

Jones also purchased the house across the street from the Christmas Story House and converted it into the Museum of A Christmas Story (f/k/a "A Christmas Story Museum"), which contains some of the props from the film, including Randy's snow suit, the Higbee's window toys, the chalk board from Miss Shields' classroom, hundreds of behind-the-scenes photos, as well as one of the custom-built Daisy Red Ryder BB guns that was used in the filming. In addition, the house to the left of the museum features a gift shop with movie memorabilia and souvenirs.

The house and museum opened to the public on November 25, 2006, with original cast members attending the grand opening, and the site drew 4,300 visitors during its opening weekend.

The house is open for tours daily; both the house and the Bumpus house next door, renovated in 2018, are available for overnight stays.

By November 2022, the entire complex was put up for sale. In November 2023, Joshua Dickerson, a 16-year employee and CEO of The House from A Christmas Story company, became the new owner.

Due to licensing issues, the official name of the attraction was changed to "House from A Christmas Story" in mid-2023.
