= Geoffrey Wigdor =

American actor (born 1982)

- Born: January 23, 1982 (age 43); New York City, New York, U.S.
- Other names: Geoff Wigdor
- Occupation(s): Actor, real estate agent
- Years active: 1989–2014
- Children: 1

Geoffrey Wigdor (born January 23, 1982) is an American actor. He is best known for his role in the drama film Sleepers in 1996.

== Career ==
Wigdor got his first role playing J.J. Forbes on the soap opera Loving, later called The City. The show was cancelled in 1997. In 1994, he played the part of Flick in the movie It Runs in the Family (aka My Summer Story). Geoffrey also appeared in commercials for Chef Boyardee and Pringles Chips. In 1996, he played young John Reilly in the film Sleepers; for his work in this film, he was nominated for the Young Artist Award for Best Performance in a Feature Film - Supporting Young Actor. He also starred in the movie Levity. He appeared on the television show Las Vegas and, in 2001, on Law & Order: Special Victims Unit (the episode was entitled "Tangled", and he played Jesse Kleberg). In 2008, he appeared on Law & Order: Special Victims Unit again, this time as Donald 'Dizzer' Zuccho in the 'Babes' episode.

== Filmography ==
Year	Title	Role	Notes
1990	The Baby-Sitters Club	Buddy Barrett	
1993–1995	Loving	John Roger 'J.J.' Forbes, Jr. #5	Unknown episodes
1994	It Runs in the Family	Flick	
1995	The Cosby Mysteries	Jeffrey	
1996	Sleepers	Young John Reilly	
1997–1998	One Life to Live	Eli Traeger	Unknown episodes
1999	In Dreams	Teenager Vivian Thompson	
1999	Guiding Light	Ryan	
2000	Law & Order	Keith Taylor	Episode: "Thin Ice"
2001	Law & Order: Special Victims Unit	Jesse Kleberg	Episode: "Tangled"
2001	The Sopranos	Little Bruce	
2002	Third Watch	Ryan Buckley	3 episodes
2003	Levity	Abner Easley	
2004	Las Vegas	Kevin	
2005	ER	Anthony	
2006	Bully	Davis White	Videogame
2007	The Black Donnellys	Tommy 'Teach' Corcoran	
2008	Leaf	Colts Fan	
2008	Law & Order: Special Victims Unit	Donald "Dizzer" Zuccho	Episode: "Babes"
2010	A Buddy Story	Raging Randy	
2010	White Irish Drinkers	Danny	
2014	Elementary	Charlie Riggs	
