= The Great American Fourth of July and Other Disasters =

- Official film logo
- Directed by: Richard Bartlett
- Written by: Jean Shepherd
- Based on: In God We Trust: All Others Pay Cash by Jean Shepherd
- Produced by: Olvia Tappan
- Starring: Matt Dillon; James Broderick; Barbara Bolton; Jay Ine; Jean Shepherd
- Cinematography: Peter Hoving
- Edited by: Dick Bartlett; Jeanne Jordan
- Music by: David Amram; Marcus Miller
- Production companies: American Playhouse; The Disney Channel; Public Broadcasting System
- Distributed by: Public Broadcasting System (PBS)
- Release date: March 16, 1982
- Running time: 75 minutes
- Country: United States
- Language: English

The Great American Fourth of July and Other Disasters is an American made-for-television family-comedy film, directed by Richard Bartlett, with a script written by Jean Shepherd. Produced by Olvia Tappan, the film is the second installment in the Ralph Parker franchise. Based on Shepherd's book In God We Trust: All Others Pay Cash and similar to all the other Parker Family films, the film depicts fictionalized events from his real-life childhood.

Released exclusively as it aired on American Playhouse, season one, episode ten, the film was met with moderately positive critical reception. In the years since, the film has been labeled as a 4th of July holiday movie classic film.

== Synopsis ==
Set during the late-1940s to early-1950s America, high school-aged Ralph Parker prepares himself for the perceived date of his life, with his friend's attractive cousin named Pamela. While he plans the event with precision, his mother and father each respectively prepare to celebrate the nation's Independence Day. Mrs. Parker passes a chain letter around the United States, while inheriting a large sum of wash rags. Though Ralph believes he's prepared for the date, he ultimately embarrasses himself. He later participates in a town parade where Wilbur Duckworth creates a memorable scene. Ralph then competes in a sack race with buddy Schwartz, to disastrous results courtesy of friendly rival Flick. Lud Kissel, the neighborhood drunk, sets off a rocket in the middle of the street before fading into folklore. Later, Mr. Parker displays his patriotism by lighting off Roman Candle fireworks that night during his usual fireworks spectacular neighborhood event. The night closes as Jean Shepherd reminisces on the power held by the memories of childhood holidays.

== Cast ==
- Matt Dillon as Ralph "Ralphie" Parker
  - Jean Shepherd as Ralph Parker/the Narrator
- James Broderick as Mr. Parker
- Barbara Bolton as Mrs. Parker
- Jay Ine as Randy Parker
- William Lampley as Flick
- Jeffery Yonis as Schwartz
- Babe Sargent as Ludlow Kissel
- Lisa Jacobsen as Pamela

== Release ==
The Great American Fourth of July and Other Disasters was released on March 16, 1982, during an episode of the anthological television series American Playhouse.

== Sequels ==
The film was followed by a number of sequels, as a part of a larger franchise of films, an adaptation for stage, and a television broadcast adaptation of that play. The film's direct follow-up, A Christmas Story, was released in 1983 with Darren McGavin playing the Old Man.
