= Ollie Hopnoodle's Haven of Bliss =

1988 television film directed by Richard Bartlett

- VHS cover
- Based on: "Ollie Hopnoodle's Haven of Bliss" by Jean Shepherd
- Screenplay by: Jean Shepherd
- Directed by: Dick Bartlett
- Starring: James Sikking; Dorothy Lyman; Jerry O'Connell; Jason Clarke Adams; Cameron Johann; Ross Eldridge
- Narrated by: Jean Shepherd
- Music by: Steve Olenick
- Country of origin: United States
- Original language: English

Production
- Producer: Fred Barzyk
- Cinematography: D'Arcy Marsh
- Editors: Dick Bartlett; Bill Anderson
- Running time: 89 minutes
- Production companies: Pholly, Inc.

Original release
- Release: August 6, 1988

Ollie Hopnoodle's Haven of Bliss is a 1988 American made-for-television comedy film written by Jean Shepherd and directed by Dick Bartlett, based on the 1968 short story by Shepherd. A satire of childhood recollections of annual family vacations, it follows the Parker family (of A Christmas Story) as they travel to a Michigan lakeside camp, the eponymous Haven. It was a co-production of The Disney Channel and PBS, and aired in that order, and was released on video.

== Plot ==
The blue-collar working world of 1950s Indiana, with period-style footage and clips from Fritz Lang's Metropolis, is accompanied by Shepherd's voiceover narration as the adult Ralph. The fourteen-year-old Ralph and friends, Flick and Schwartz, endure bureaucratic "terminal official boredom", to get their "working papers", to be able to apply for their first summer jobs.

The next day at breakfast, Ralph announces that he, Flick, and Schwartz have job interviews, and Mom notices that the family dog, Fuzzhead (Shepherd's dog Daphne) seems to be missing. Adult Ralph describes this as the beginning of the "Scary Fuzzhead Saga, which traumatized our family for years". The three friends interview at Scott's Used Furniture Palace, where adult Ralph describes the owner as "a cross between Rasputin and The Wolfman" (played in the film by Shepherd himself). They are hired, in "a truly historic moment". They fantasize about what they'll do with all the money they'll make. Clocking in on the job, they proceed to their first assignment - depicted in stock footage as enslaved workers descending to a dark basement. Mom calls the police to report Fuzzhead's disappearance and announces to the Old Man, as he leaves for work, that she's "not going on any vacation" until she is found. She posts hand-drawn "reward" posters for her return and places an ad in the newspaper. The Old Man, at the Bluebird, the neighborhood bar, laments the likely delay of his vacation. The first day of Ralph's moving job is difficult and exhausting, as they struggle to move a mammoth refrigerator up five flights of stairs. At dinner Ralph is so sore and stiff his joints creak and pop. The next day, back on the job, they move an identical refrigerator up another seven flights of stairs. Over the next two weeks, Ralph "toils ceaselessly" at Scott's, while Mom relentlessly "like Ahab" searches for Fuzzhead, with visits to dog pounds and repeatedly dragging the Old Man out to drive around looking for her. At night, Ralph has eerie nightmares, including a towering, laughing refrigerator. The next day, having seen Mom's badly-sketched reward posters, "people from three counties arrived with their mutts, trying for the big reward". Ralph's summer job ends abruptly when they are fired. Then "a miracle" happens - the Old Man, driving around again with Mom, spots Fuzzhead in the rear window of a black Rolls-Royce, and gives chase, all the way to the home of the rich dowager at whose doorstep she appeared. She returns to the family home, left with "only her memories", a montage of meals on crystal and pampered treatment. At dinner, Ralph fibs, saying he quit his job to spend time with the family. As a result, they are free to pack and, as adult Ralph describes, begin their "epic" road trip.

The trip includes drastic overpacking of the brown Chevy sedan, a reluctant starter motor, an endlessly carsick and complaining Randy, side trips to shop for unnecessary "slob art", a flat tire, running out of gas as the Old Man insists on only "Texas Royal Supreme Blue" gasoline, a misadventure at a gas station with an unseen enormous growling "meers hound", a boiled-over radiator as an occasion for a roadside picnic, and a missed detour sign and resulting circular detour due to squabbling among the kids. In the middle of a pasture, as cows surround the car, adult Ralph describes the scene: "beset on all sides by strange creatures, the lost mariner searches and searches, in the Sargasso sea of life". Rounding out the road trip, more unnecessary shopping, a Dutch lawn windmill being bought and put on top of the car, Ralph's confession of forgetting the fishing tackle, being stuck behind a live poultry truck, and panic over another "magically appearing" carbound bee. When they finally arrive at Clear Lake, the Old Man learns that the fish have stopped biting. Ralph discovers the Old Man had packed the fishing tackle after all, and they walk out onto the boat ramp to take in the view, as a few drops of rain fall. A torrential downpour develops, and in the cabin, leaks from the roof drip into every available pot and basin, as adult Ralph describes, all day, every day of their vacation. At bedtime, Mom reassures him that the Old Man loves him, even though he never calls him by his real name (just "watermelon", "radish-top", "cookie cutter", etc.). A lightning strike knocks out power to the rain-drenched lakeside camp's welcome sign, and the credits roll.

== Cast ==
- Adult Ralph: Jean Shepherd
- Old Man: James Sikking
- Mom: Dorothy Lyman
- Young Ralph: Jerry O'Connell
- Randy: Jason Clarke Adams
- Scott: Jean Shepherd
- Flick: Cameron Johann
- Schwartz: Ross Eldridge
- Cop: Bill McDonald
- Clerk: Marjorie O'Neill-Butler
- Johnson: Edward Logan
- Archie: W. Clapham Murray
- Zudoc: Frank T. Wells
- Gertz: Peter Gerety
- John: Robert T. Colonna
- Ace: Arnie Cox
- Mrs. Kissel: Leslie Harrell
- Animal Shelter Assistant: Dorothy Chiesa
- Chauffeur: Martin Rayner
- Colette: Annabelle Weenick
- Grannie: John William Galt
- Gas Station Attendant: Peyton Park
- Leopold Doppler: Desmond Dhooge
- Fuzzhead: Daphne

== Story and early screenplay ==
Shepherd originally wrote the story, upon which the film is based, in 1968 as one of a series for Playboy Magazine between 1966 and 1970. The stories were later published in Shepherd's collection Wanda Hickey's Night of Golden Memories in 1971. Shepherd later described his stories as not based literally on childhood memories: "People are always trying to make me sound like I'm just writing what happened to me. You know, I'm a humorist and a filmmaker. I don't think my stuff is any more autobiographical than, say, Woody Allen's is - or anybody who is involved in making serious films."

Television comedy director John Rich wrote in his memoir that in the 1970s he commissioned Shepherd to write a screenplay from Hopnoodle's, as a possible series pilot episode for the ABC television network. He described the script as quite faithful to the story, but problems with management during production prevented that script from being released on American television.

=== Production ===
The film was a co-production of "Disney, public TV's American Playhouse and Boston public TV station WGBH", funded by Disney, under the terms, according to Shepherd, that "they would have nothing to do with production." Fred Barzyk was producer for this film, as he was for Shepherd's other work for WGBH. It was produced from Shepherd's studio in Florida, and exterior scenes were shot in several locations around Dallas, Texas, to stand in for the film's "Hohman, Indiana".

=== Releases ===
The film originally aired numerous times on the Disney Channel beginning August 6, 1988, then shortly thereafter on PBS nationwide, and was released by Walt Disney Home Video on VHS in 1993.

== Recognition ==
The film was nominated for a Cable ACE Award for "Best Movie or Miniseries" in 1988.

=== Reception ===
Reviews ranged from mildly negative to positive. Upon its inaugural airing on the Disney Channel in 1988, The Lexington Herald-Leader called the film "pleasant", but thought the beginning of the film might seem too similar to National Lampoon's Vacation to viewers unfamiliar with Shepherd's work. Daniel Ruth of the Chicago Sun-Times gave the film three stars, described it as "cute", and a "wistful, yet chaotic drive down memory lane", and stated, Shepherd "never loses" his "ability to see the world through a child's eyes".

In 1989, prior to the film's broadcast on PBS, Irv Letovsky of the Los Angeles Times was blasé, calling the film, "a lot of cute", but "though cute, this is sort of a compendium of how things used to be", also noting that "some of the older generation might enjoy the diversion." New Jersey Star-Ledger reviewer Jerry Krupnick found the film "hilarious" and "super fun", but declared that the role Shepherd took on for himself in the first 30 minutes of the film only stretched a "nifty 90-minute comedy" to two hours, and made it "cluttered". Time magazine listed Ollie Hopnoodle as a "Critic's Choice" for viewers in 1989.

== Sequels ==
Ollie Hopnoodle's Haven of Bliss was the last film of the Parker Family film series to be produced and distributed for television. By this time, Shepherd was making far more money from the reruns and home video sales from A Christmas Story and decided to focus on producing another feature film. The film's direct follow-up, It Runs in the Family: My Summer Story, was released in 1994 in theaters.
