= Jean Shepherd =

American writer and radio host (1921–1999)

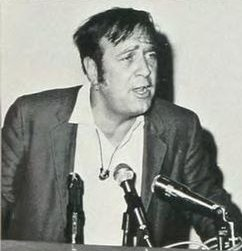
- Shepherd circa 1969
- Born: Jean Parker Shepherd Jr. July 26, 1921; Chicago, Illinois, US
- Died: October 16, 1999 (aged 78); Fort Myers, Florida, US
- Occupations: Writer, humorist, actor, raconteur, radio host
- Spouses: Barbara Olive Mattoon (m. 1947; div. 1948) Joan Laverne Warner (m. 1950; div. 1960) Lois Nettleton (m. 1960; div. 1967) Leigh Brown (m. 1977; died 1998)
- Children: 2
- Writing career
- Pen name: Shep (nickname)
- Years active: 1945–1998
- Genres: Humor, satire
- Military career
- Allegiance: United States
- Branch: United States Army
- Service years: 1942–1944
- Rank: Technician Fifth Grade (T/5)
- Unit: Signal Corps

Jean Parker Shepherd Jr. (July 26, 1921 – October 16, 1999) was an American storyteller, humorist, radio and TV personality, writer, and actor. With a career that spanned decades, Shepherd is known for the film A Christmas Story (1983), which he narrated and co-scripted on the basis of his own semi-autobiographical stories.

== Early life ==
Shepherd was born to Anna and Jean Parker Shepherd in 1921, on the South Side of Chicago. He briefly lived in East Chicago, Indiana, but was raised in Hammond, Indiana, where he graduated from Hammond High School, in 1939. A Christmas Story is loosely based on his days growing up at 2907 Cleveland Street in Hammond's southeast neighborhood of Hessville. As a youth, he worked briefly as a mail carrier in a steel mill and earned his amateur radio license (W9QWN) at age 16, sometimes claiming he was even younger. He sporadically attended the Calumet Center of Indiana University in East Chicago, but never graduated. During World War II, he served stateside in the U.S. Army Signal Corps. Shepherd then had an extensive career in a variety of media.

== Career ==
=== Radio ===
After his military service, Shepherd began his broadcast radio career in early 1945, on WJOB in Hammond, Indiana, later working at WTOD in Toledo, Ohio, in 1946. He began working in Cincinnati, Ohio, in January 1947 at WSAI, later also working at Cincinnati stations WCKY and WKRC the following year, before returning to WSAI in 1949. From 1951 to 1953, he had a late-night broadcast on KYW in Philadelphia, Pennsylvania, after which he returned to Cincinnati for several different shows on WLW-T and WLW. After starting on television there, he also returned to radio. "Shep", as he was known, left WLW radio in late summer of 1954 and settled in at WOR radio New York City on February 26, 1955, where he would remain until spring 1977. Beginning on an overnight slot in 1956, he delighted his fans by telling stories, reading poetry (especially the works of Robert W. Service), and organizing comedic listener stunts.

==== I, Libertine hoax ====
The most famous stunt was a hoax he created about a nonexistent book, I, Libertine, by a fake author "Frederick R. Ewing", in 1956. During a discussion on how easy it was to manipulate the best-seller lists based on demand, as well as sales, Shepherd suggested that his listeners visit bookstores and ask for a copy of I, Libertine, which led to booksellers attempting to order the book from their distributors. Fans of the show planted references to the book and author so widely that demand for the book led to claims of it being on The New York Times Best Seller list. Filling the demand, Theodore Sturgeon and Betty Ballantine wrote the long-awaited book to Shepherd's outline, with a cover designed by illustrator Frank Kelly Freas, published by Ballantine Books.

==== Sweetheart Soap ====
When he was about to be released by WOR in 1956 for lack of sponsors, he did a commercial for Sweetheart Soap, not a sponsor, and was immediately fired. His listeners besieged WOR with complaints, and when Sweetheart offered to sponsor him, he was reinstated. Eventually, he attracted more sponsors than he wanted – the commercials interrupted the flow of his monologues. Former WOR engineer, Frank Cernese, adds, "The commercials of that era were on 'ETs' – phonograph records about 14" in diameter. Three large turntables were available to play them in sequence. Shepherd preferred the engineer to watch and listen to his stories. That left little time to load the turntables and cue the appropriate cuts. That was when he started complaining about "too many commercials".

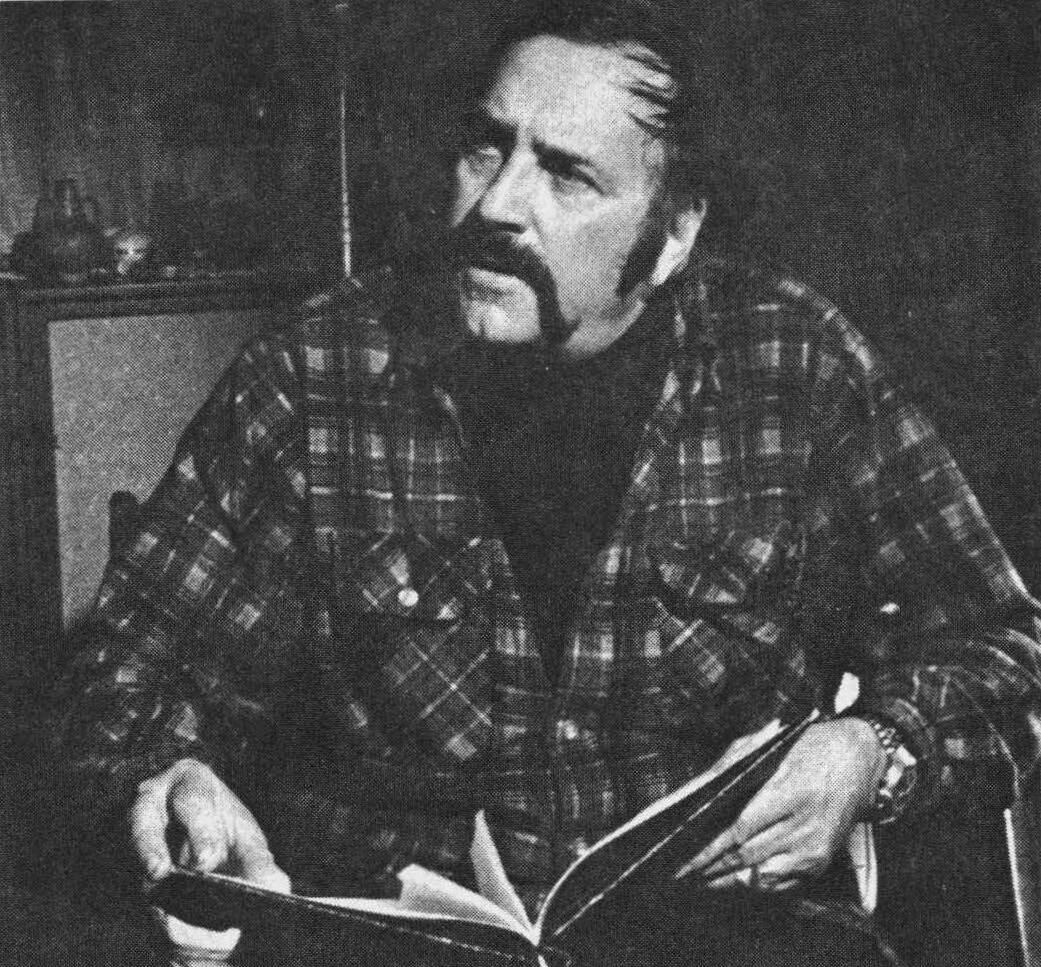
Shepherd circa 1973

His last WOR broadcast was on April 1, 1977. His subsequent radio work consisted of short segments on several other stations, including crosstown WCBS, and occasional commentaries on NPR's All Things Considered.

In addition to his stories, his shows also contained humorous anecdotes and commentaries about the human condition, observations about New York City life, accounts of vacations in Maine, and travels throughout the world. One striking program recounted his participation in the March on Washington in August 1963, during which Martin Luther King Jr. gave his "I Have a Dream" speech, and another program that aired on November 25, 1963, covered the burial of assassinated President John F. Kennedy.

Throughout his radio career, he performed without scripts. His friend and WOR colleague Barry Farber marveled at how he could talk so long with so few notes. During a radio interview, Shepherd claimed that some shows took weeks to prepare, but this may have been in the planning rather than the writing of a script. On most of his Fourth of July broadcasts, he did read one of his most enduring and popular short stories, "Ludlow Kissel and the Dago Bomb that Struck Back", about a neighborhood drunk and his disastrous fireworks escapades. In the 1960s and 1970s, his WOR show ran from 11:15 pm to midnight, later changed to 10:15 pm to 11 pm, so his "Ludlow Kissel" reading was synchronized to many New Jersey and New York local town fireworks displays, which would typically reach their climax at 10 pm. It was possible, on one of those July 4 nights, to park one's car on a hilltop and watch several different pyrotechnic displays, accompanied by Shepherd's storytelling.

=== Print ===
Jean Shepherd posed as Frederick R. Ewing on the back cover of Ballantine's I, Libertine (1956).

Shepherd wrote a series of humorous short stories about growing up in northwest Indiana and its steel towns, many of which were first told by him on his programs and then published in Playboy. The stories were later assembled into books titled In God We Trust: All Others Pay Cash, Wanda Hickey's Night of Golden Memories: And Other Disasters, The Ferrari in the Bedroom, and A Fistful of Fig Newtons. Some of those situations were incorporated into his movies and television fictional stories. He also wrote a column for the early Village Voice, a column for Car and Driver, numerous individual articles for diverse publications, including Mad Magazine ("The Night People vs. Creeping Meatballism", March/April 1957), and introductions for books such as The America of George Ade, American Snapshots, and the 1970 reprint of the 1929 Johnson Smith Catalogue.

When Eugene B. Bergmann's Excelsior, You Fathead! The Art and Enigma of Jean Shepherd was published in 2005, Publishers Weekly reviewed:

This prismatic portrait affirms Shepherd's position as one of the 20th century's great humorists. Railing against conformity, he forged a unique personal bond with his loyal listeners, who participated in his legendary literary prank by asking bookstores for the nonexistent novel I, Libertine (when publisher Ian Ballantine had Shepherd, author Theodore Sturgeon, and illustrator Frank Kelly Freas make the fake real, PW called it "the hoax that became a book"). Storyteller Shepherd's grand theme was life itself ... Novelist Bergmann (Rio Amazonas) interviewed 32 people who knew Shepherd or were influenced by him and listened to hundreds of broadcast tapes, inserting transcripts of Shepherd's own words into a "biographical framework" of exhaustive research.

Shep's Army: Bummers, Blisters, and Boondoggles, almost three dozen of Jean Shepherd's radio stories about the army, transcribed, edited, and introduced by Eugene B. Bergmann, is a book of stories by Shepherd. (Opus Books, August 2013)

=== Television and films ===
Starting in March 1953, Shepherd briefly had a television program on WLW-T in Cincinnati called Rear Bumper. He claimed that he was recommended to replace the resigning Steve Allen on NBC's Tonight Show. Shepherd was reportedly brought to New York City by NBC executives to prepare for the position, but they were contractually bound to first offer it to Jack Paar. The network was certain Paar would hold out for a role in prime time, but he accepted the late-night assignment. However, he did not assume the position permanently until Shepherd and Ernie Kovacs had co-hosted the show.

In late 1960 and early 1961, he did a weekly television show, Inside Jean Shepherd, on WOR-TV (channel 9) in New York, but it did not last long. Between 1971 and 1994, Shepherd became a screenwriter of note, writing and producing numerous works for both television and cinema, all based on his originally spoken and written stories. He was the writer and narrator of the show Jean Shepherd's America, produced by Boston Public Television station WGBH for PBS, in which he visited various American locales, and interviewed local people of interest. He used a somewhat similar format for the New Jersey Network TV show Shepherd's Pie.

Shepherd appeared as a contestant on the CBS television program I've Got a Secret, on the August 31, 1960 episode. His secret was, “I play music on my head”.

He wrote and narrated many works, the most famous being the 1983 MGM feature film A Christmas Story, filmed at A Christmas Story House, which is now considered a holiday classic. Shepherd narrates the film as the adult Ralph Parker, and also has a cameo role playing a man in line at the department store waiting for Santa Claus.

PBS aired several television movies based on Shepherd stories, also featuring the Parker family. These included The Phantom of the Open Hearth (1976), which aired as part of the anthology series Visions; The Great American Fourth of July and Other Disasters (1982) and The Star-Crossed Romance of Josephine Cosnowski (1985), both as part of the anthology series American Playhouse; and Ollie Hopnoodle's Haven of Bliss (1988), a co-production with The Disney Channel. All were narrated by Shepherd, but otherwise featured different casts.

Once Shepherd noticed the amount of money he was making from reruns of A Christmas Story (which was slowly becoming a television tradition), he abandoned television; in 1994, A Christmas Story director Bob Clark and he returned to the same working-class Cleveland street neighborhood to film a sequel, It Runs in the Family (later known as My Summer Story), released by MGM in 1994 and (because the 11-year span between films caused almost all the actors to age out of their roles) featuring an almost entirely different cast from the previous film.

=== Live performances and recordings ===
On Saturday nights for several years, Shepherd broadcast his WOR radio program live from the Limelight Café in New York City's Greenwich Village, and he also performed at many colleges nationwide. His live shows were a perennial favorite at Rutgers to standing-room-only crowds, and Fairleigh Dickinson Universities (he often referred to the latter as "Fairly Ridiculous University" on his WOR show). He performed at Princeton University for over 30 years, beginning in 1956 until 1996, three years before his death. He performed before sold-out audiences at Carnegie Hall and Town Hall.

He was also emcee for several important jazz concerts in the late 1950s. Shepherd's first known recording, the 1955 Abbott Records album Jean Shepherd... Into the Unknown with Jazz Music, featured his short comments interspersed with jazz pieces composed by Mitch Leigh and Art Harris. Shepherd improvised spoken-word narration for the title track on jazz musician Charles Mingus's 1957 album The Clown. Mingus was a fan of Shepherd's radio show and outlined a concept for Shepherd but encouraged him to elaborate and improvise.

Eight record albums of live and studio performances of Shepherd's were released between 1955 and 1975. In 1993, Shepherd recorded the opening narration and the voice of the Audio-Animatronics "Father" character for the updated Carousel of Progress attraction at Walt Disney World Magic Kingdom.

=== Music ===
On some of his broadcasts, he played parts of recordings of such novelty songs as "The Bear Missed the Train" (a parody of the Yiddish ballad "Bei Mir Bist Du Schoen"), and "The Sheik of Araby". Sometimes, Shepherd would accompany the recordings by playing the Jew's harp, nose flute, or kazoo, and occasionally even by thumping his knuckles on his head.

The theme song of his show was "Bahn Frei!" by Eduard Strauss. The particular version Shepherd used was a recording by Arthur Fiedler and the Boston Pops, with arrangement by Peter Bodge, released in April 1946 by RCA Victor-Red Seal. This arrangement recast the 19th-century polka from one relating to travel by train to a fast-tempo piece directed to horses and a race track, principally achieved by opening with a well-known bugle call named "Call to the Post".

== Personal life ==
When discussing his personal life, Shepherd was evasive to the point of being intentionally misleading about the actual details. To what extent Shepherd's radio and published stories were fact, fiction, or a combination of the two is unknown. The childhood friends included in many of his stories were people he claimed to have invented, yet high-school yearbooks and numerous other sources confirm that many of them, including school buddies "Flick" and "Schwartz", did indeed exist. His father was a cashier at the Borden Milk Company; Shepherd always referred to him as "the old man". During an interview on the Long John Nebel Show – an all-night radio program that ran on WOR starting at midnight – Shepherd once claimed that his real father was a cartoonist along the lines of Herblock, and that he inherited his skills at line drawings. This may well have not been true, but Shepherd's ink drawings do adorn some of his published writings, and a number of previously unknown ones were sold on eBay from the collection of his former wife Lois Nettleton after her death in 2008.

The 1930 Federal Census Record for Hammond, Indiana, indicates that Jean's father did work for a dairy company; his occupation reads "cashier". The 1930 census record lists these family members: Jean Shepherd, age 30, head; Anna Shepherd, age 30, wife; Jean Shepherd Jr, age 8, son; and Randall Shepherd, age 6, son. According to this record, Jean Sr., Anna, Jean Jr., and Randall were all born in Illinois, and Jean Sr.'s parents (Emmett and Flora) were born in Kansas. However, all other decennial federal and state census records, as well as other official documents such as death certificates, indicate that Emmett and Flora were born in Indiana. Anna's parents, August and Katherine, were born in Germany.

Shepherd lived in several New York City locations during his WOR days and for a time in New Milford, New Jersey, and in Washington Township, Warren County, New Jersey.

Shepherd was married four times. He was briefly married in 1947 to Barbara Mattoon in Hammond. Shepherd had two children, a son Randall and daughter Adrian, with his second wife, Joan Laverne Warner. (He publicly denied this, including in his last will and testament, executed some five months prior to his death.) Randall has said that Shepherd left his mother shortly before they divorced in 1957; he had almost no contact with his father after his parents' divorce. Shepherd's third wife was actress Lois Nettleton. In 1984, he moved to Sanibel Island, Florida, with his fourth wife, Leigh Brown.

Shepherd died in a hospital in Fort Myers, Florida, in 1999, of natural causes.

== Legacy ==
Shepherd's oral narrative style was a precursor to that used by Spalding Gray and Garrison Keillor. Marshall McLuhan in Understanding Media wrote that Shepherd "regards radio as a new medium for a new kind of novel that he writes nightly." In the Seinfeld season-six DVD set, commenting on the episode titled "The Gymnast", Jerry Seinfeld said, "He really formed my entire comedic sensibility – I learned how to do comedy from Jean Shepherd." Seinfeld was interviewed at a tribute to Shepherd held at the Paley Center for Media on January 23, 2012, confirming the importance of Shepherd on his career and discussing how he and Shepherd had similar ways of humorously discussing minor incidents in life. The first name of Seinfeld's third child is "Shepherd".

Shepherd's life and multimedia career are examined in the 2005 book Excelsior, You Fathead! The Art and Enigma of Jean Shepherd by Eugene B. Bergmann.

Shepherd's 7-step approach to "compassionate humor" in storytelling is described in the appendix to the 2024 book You'll Shoot Your Eye Out! Life Lessons from the Movie A Christmas Story, by writer and communication professor Quentin Schultze, who taught with Shepherd.

Shepherd was an influence on Bill Griffith's Zippy comic strip, as Griffith noted in his strip for January 9, 2000. Griffith explained, "The inspiration – just plucking random memories from my childhood, as I'm wont to do in my Sunday strip (also a way to expand beyond Zippy) – and Shep was a big part of them".

In an interview with New York magazine, Steely Dan's Donald Fagen says that the eponymous figure from his solo album The Nightfly was based on Jean Shepherd. Fagen devoted a chapter of his autobiography, Eminent Hipsters, to Shepherd.

Though he primarily spent his radio career playing music, New York Top-40 DJ Dan Ingram has acknowledged Shepherd's style as an influence.

An article Shepherd wrote for MAD issue no. 32 (March–April 1957), "The Night People vs Creeping Meatballism", described the differences between what he considered to be "day people" (conformists) and "night people" (nonconformists). The opening credits of John Cassavetes' 1959 film Shadows include "Presented by Jean Shepherd's Night People".

In 2005, Shepherd was posthumously inducted into the National Radio Hall of Fame, and in November 2013, he was posthumously inducted into the Broadcast Pioneers of Philadelphia Hall of Fame.

== Bibliography ==
- I, Libertine (1956, hoax novel perpetrated by Shepherd, written by Theodore Sturgeon as "Frederick R. Ewing")
- The America of George Ade (1960, edited and introduced by Jean Shepherd)
- In God We Trust: All Others Pay Cash (1966)
- Wanda Hickey's Night of Golden Memories: And Other Disasters (1971)
- The Ferrari in the Bedroom (1972)
- The Phantom of the Open Hearth (1978)
- A Fistful of Fig Newtons (1981)
- A Christmas Story (book) (2003, published posthumously)

== Discography ==
- Jean Shepherd – Into the Unknown With Jazz Music (1955)
- Jean Shepherd and Other Foibles (1959)
- Will Failure Spoil Jean Shepherd? (1960)
- "Live" At The Limelight (1965)
- Declassified Jean Shepherd (1971)
- Jean Shepherd Reads Poems of Robert Service (1975)

== Filmography ==
Year	Film	Role	Notes
1954	New Faces		Uncredited
1959	Shadows	Man at Party	Uncredited
1960	Village Sunday	Narrator	Documentary
1960	Summer Incident	Narrator	Documentary short Writer
1964	Light Fantastic	Frank	
1970	NET Playhouse		Episode: "America, Inc."; Writer
1971	Tiki Tiki		Voice
1971	Jean Shepherd's America	Himself	TV series Writer
1973	No Whistles, Bells, or Bedlam	Narrator	Short film
1976	The Phantom of the Open Hearth	Narrator/Ralph Parker	TV movie Writer
1978	Shepherd's Pie	Himself	
1980	Flickers	Narrator	TV Mini-Series
1982	The Great American Fourth of July and Other Disasters	Narrator/Ralph Parker	TV movie Writer
1983	A Christmas Story	Narrator/Adult Ralphie	Co-Writer
1984	Jean Shepherd on Route 1 ... and Other Major Thoroughfares	Himself	TV Short; Writer
1985	The Star-Crossed Romance of Josephine Cosnowski	Himself	TV movie Writer
1985	The Great American Road-Racing Festival	Himself	TV movie documentary Writer
1987	Norman Rockwell: An American Portrait	Himself	TV movie documentary
1988	Ollie Hopnoodle's Haven of Bliss	Ralph, the Man/Scott	TV movie Writer
1988–1991	Sesame Street	Himself	2 Episodes: "Cowboy X" segments
1994	My Summer Story	Narrator/Adult Ralphie	Co-Writer
1997	Christmas Unwrapped: The History of Christmas	Himself	TV movie documentary
1998	Babe Ruth	Himself	TV movie documentary

== See also ==
- WOR (AM)
