= In God We Trust: All Others Pay Cash =

1966 novel by Jean Shepherd

- First edition, 1966
- Author: Jean Shepherd
- Language: English
- Genre: Humor
- Publisher: Doubleday; Broadway Books
- Publication date: 1966
- Publication place: United States
- Media type: Print (hardback & paperback)
- ISBN: 0-385-02174-7
- OCLC: 4583520

In God We Trust: All Others Pay Cash is a collection of short stories by American humorist Jean Shepherd. It was first published in October 1966.

A best-seller at the time of its publication, it is considered Shepherd's most important published work. The work inspired several films in the Parker Family Saga, including A Christmas Story (1983) and My Summer Story (1994). Shepherd is the narrator in both films.

== Background ==
Jean Shepherd was a well-known American humorist who performed on radio in the decades after World War II. Beginning in June 1964, he began adapting many of his radio stories for publication in Playboy magazine. He focused primarily on those which depicted his childhood in the fictional town of Hohman, Indiana (a stand-in for Shepherd's home town of Hammond, Indiana).

According to Playboy founder Hugh Hefner, author Shel Silverstein had long encouraged Shepherd to write down his radio stories, but Shepherd was reluctant to do so because he was not a writer. Eventually, Silverstein recorded Shepherd's stories on tape, transcribed them, and then together with Shepherd edited and developed the most popular. Fellow WOR AM radio personality Barry Farber said Shepherd came to enjoy writing, as it allowed him to develop themes, and Shepherd began to work on written stories by himself. Shepherd claimed it took him three years to complete In God We Trust: All Others Pay Cash. Some of its stories were the first of Shepherd's work to appear in Playboy.

Shepherd's stories are a mix of fact and fiction. They are often described as nostalgic or memoirs, Shepherd described them simply as fictional stories about childhood, a view seconded by scholars Penelope Joan Fritzer and Bartholomew Bland. However, drawn as they were from his radio storytelling, Shepherd wove elements of real life into his tales (such as names of some of the characters being found in his high school yearbook, having a younger brother Randy, and Hammond being home to a Warren G. Harding Elementary School, a Cleveland Street, and a Hohlman Avenue)) and certainly took artistic license in exaggerating any real-life events that may have served as seeds for his yarns. As Mark Skertic put it for the Chicago Sun-Times: [the city of] "Hohman doesn't really exist, but the sights, sounds and events Mr. Shepherd described happening there grew out of his experiences growing up in and around real-life Hammond, Ind."

== Title ==
The title of the novel is a play on the motto "In God We Trust", a foundational belief of the American Founding Fathers adopted by both the nation's coinage and paper currency in the 19th century. The tacked-on "all others pay cash" became a popular witticism in America in the early decades of the 20th century, commonly seen as a form of "crackerbarrel philosophy" repudiating credit and checks as payment found on signs and carved placards hanging in bars, restaurants, and retail stores past its middle decades.

== Contents ==
Most of the stories in the novel are domestic in nature, discussing life in the home. Rather than focus on the family, however, they paint a portrait for the reader of an "amusingly old-fashioned society".

Shepherd said on his radio show after turning in his collection: "I did something today that you don't do very often in your life. I delivered to my publisher - I delivered to him the completed, edited, done manuscript of a novel I have been working on for over three years..."

While Shepherd's publisher, Doubleday, promoted the collection of stories as a novel, Shepherd biographer Eugene Bermann, however, observes the work lacks either an overriding theme or consistent characters to be regarded as one. Michael Sragow, writing for Salon.com, called the book "memoirlike".

=== Stories ===
There are 31 chapters in the book, each its own story. They are told by the fictional character Ralph, who has returned to his home town of Hohman as an adult, to his friend, Flick, who runs the bar where Ralph drinks away the day. The longer stories are linked by one- or two-page chapters in which Ralph and Flick discuss their childhood or the present state of Hohman, exchanges which trigger Ralph's next reminiscence.

The 2010 Broadway Books reprint of the 2000 Doubleday paperback version of the book lists the following longer stories:

- "Duel in the Snow, or Red Ryder Nails the Cleveland Street Kid"
- "The Counterfeit Secret Circle Member Gets the Message, or The Asp Strikes Again"
- "The Endless Streetcar Ride Into the Night, and the Tinfoil Noose"
- "Hairy Geertz and the Forty-Seven Crappies"
- "My Old Man and the Lascivious Special Award That Heralded the Birth of Pop Art"
- "The Magic Mountain"
- "Grover Dill and the Tasmanian Devil"
- "Ludlow Kissel and the Dago Bomb That Struck Back"
- "Uncle Ben and the Side-Splitting Knee-Slapper, or Some Words Are Loaded"
- "Old Man Pulaski and the Infamous Jawbreaker Blackmail Caper"
- "The Perfect Crime"
- "Wilbur Duckworth and His Magic Baton"
- "Miss Bryfogel and the Frightening Case of the Speckle-Throated Cuckold"
- "'Nevermore', Quoth the Assessor, 'Nevermore ...'"
- "Leopold Doppler and the Great Orpheum Gravy Boat Riot"

== Critical reception ==
Eugene Bergmann, who published a study of Shepherd's published works, has called the novel his most important work, and anthology editor Gardner Dozois noted in 2002 that it is also Shepherd's best known work. Decades after its publication, the novel was claimed to have been a New York Times best-seller in 1966. At the time of Shepherd's death in 1999, it had been through ten printings.

In God We Trust: All Others Pay Cash was the 142nd best-selling novel on Amazon.com the week after Shepherd died, when the novel was 33 years old.

== Adaptations ==
Four of the short stories ("Duel in the Snow", "The Counterfeit Secret Circle Member Gets the Message", "My Old Man and the Lascivious Special Award That Heralded the Birth of Pop Art", and "Grover Dill and the Tasmanian Devil") were used as the basis for the 1983 film A Christmas Story. Some phrases and small elements of other stories were also incorporated. Another short story, "The Grandstand Passion Play of Delbert and the Bumpus Hounds", was drawn from Shepherd's second book of them, Wanda Hickey's Night of Golden Memories.

The five short stories that were used as the basis for A Christmas Story were collected under the title A Christmas Story and published as a stand-alone book in 2003.

Other short stories in the book were used for the 1994 sequel My Summer Story.

== See also ==
- Parker Family Saga (franchise)

== Bibliography ==
- Bergmann, Eugene B. Excelsior, You Fathead!: The Art and Enigma of Jean Shepherd. New York: Applause Theatre & Cinema Books, 2005.
- Dozois, Gardner R., ed. The Year's Best Science Fiction: Nineteenth Annual Collection. New York: St. Martin's Griffin, 2002.
- Fritzer, Penelope Joan and Bland, Bartholomew. Merry Wives and Others: A History of Domestic Humor Writing. Jefferson, N.C. McFarland & Co., 2002.
- Gaines, Caseen. A Christmas Story: Behind the Scenes of a Holiday Classic. Toronto: ECW Press, 2013.
- Niezgoda, Frank. Fish Food: Teach Us to Fish Lord. Maitland, Fla.: Xulon Press, 2009.
- Shepherd, Jean. In God We Trust, All Others Pay Cash. New York: Broadway Books, 2010.
