= Philip Casnoff =

American actor

- Born: August 3, 1949 (age 77); Philadelphia, Pennsylvania, U.S.
- Education: Central High School; Wesleyan University
- Occupation: Actor • director
- Years active: 1978-present
- Known for: Television • film • theater
- Spouse: Roxanne Hart (m. 1984)
- Children: 2

Philip Casnoff (born August 3, 1949) is an American actor and director, known for his roles in TV series and on Broadway. He is probably best known for his portrayal of the sadistic, egomaniacal antagonist Elkanah Bent in the miniseries North and South.

== Early life and education ==
Born in Philadelphia, Pennsylvania on August 3, 1949, Philip Casnoff graduated in the 226th Class from Central High School in Philadelphia, Pennsylvania in 1967, and later from Wesleyan University, where he first caught the acting bug.

== Personal life ==
Casnoff married actress Roxanne Hart. They have two sons.

== Filmography ==
=== Film ===
| Year | Title | Role | Notes |
|---|---|---|---|
| 1978 | Message from Space | Aaron | film debut |
| 1980 | Gorp | Bergman | |
| 1980 | Christmas Evil | Ricardo Bauma | |
| 1992 | Jersey Girl | Mitchell | |
| 1994 | Saints and Sinners | Detective Battaglia | |
| 1994 | Temptation | Michael Reddick | |
| 1998 | How Stella Got Her Groove Back | Kennedy | |
| 2006 | Material Girls | Victor Marchetta | |
| 2010 | Mineville | Mr. Johnson | also Associate Producer |
| 2011 | Grace Face | Steve | Short Film |
| 2013 | Sex & Marriage | Rosen | Direct-to-Video |
| 2015 | Ted 2 | Playstation Owner | uncredited |
| 2015 | Sight Unseen | Rusty Sampson | |
| 2016 | Harvey's Dream | —N/a | Short Film; Nominated – Sanford International Film Festival Award for Best Acting Duo (shared with Roxanna Hart) |
| 2017 | The Post | Chalmers Roberts | |
| 2023 | Rachel Hendrix | Jerry Rorty | |

=== Television ===
| Year | Title | Role | Notes |
|---|---|---|---|
| 1982 | American Playhouse | unknown | Episode: "King of America" |
| 1982 | The Renegades | Dancer | Television Movie |
| 1982 | Remington Steele | Ben Pearson | Episode: "License to Steele"; Credited as Philip Sanoff |
| 1983 | The Hamptons | David Landau | Episode: "#1.1" |
| 1984 | George Washington | Lafayette | Television Miniseries; Episode: "#1.1" |
| 1984 | ABC Afterschool Special | Harvey Schmidt | Episode: "Out of Step" |
| 1984 | The Edge of Night | Brian Murdock | 33 Episodes |
| 1984 | Tales from the Darkside | Chris Wood | Episode: "Slippage" |
| 1985 | Crazy Like a Fox | Gino | Episode: "Bum Tip" |
| 1985 | North and South: Book I | Major Elkanah Bent | Television Miniseries (8 Episodes) |
| 1986 | North and South: Book II | Major Elkanah Bent | Television Miniseries (8 Episodes) |
| 1987 | Hands of a Stranger | Marty Loftus | Television Movie |
| 1988 | The Red Spider | Detective Patrick Shaunessy | Television Movie |
| 1990 | One Life to Live | Rob Riviera | 5 Episodes |
| 1991 | Ironclads | Lieutenant Guilford | Television Movie |
| 1991 | Red Wind | Charlie Lapidus | Television Movie |
| 1992 | Sinatra | Frank Sinatra | Television Miniseries (4 Episodes); Nominated – American Television Award for Best Actor in a Miniseries; Nominated – Golden Globe Award for Best Lead Actor in a Miniseries or Motion Picture Made for Television |
| 1994 | North and South: Book III | Elkanah Bent | Television Miniseries (3 Episodes) |
| 1994–1995 | Under Suspicion | Internal Affairs Detective James Vitelli | Series Regular (18 Episodes) |
| 1995 | Sisters | Jack Chambers | 3 Episodes |
| 1995 | Zoya | Simon Hirsch | Television Movie |
| 1995 | Chicago Hope | Paul Accosta | Episode: "Christmas Truce" |
| 1996 | Special Report: Journey to Mars | Nick Van Pelt | Television Movie |
| 1996 | The Nanny | Cantor Gary Isaacs | Episode: "The Cantor Show"; Performer: "Bayom Hahu" and "Change My Mind" |
| 1996 | Wings | Eric | Episode: "Too Beautiful for You" |
| 1996 | Promise Land | Bill Carter | Episode: "Little Girl Lost" |
| 1997 | Little Girls in Pretty Boxes | Greg Radkin | Television Movie |
| 1997 | The Hunger | William Cobb | Episode: "Necros" |
| 1998 | Blood in Her Hands | Richard Davis | Television Movie |
| 1998 | Players | John Fellowes | Episode: "Con-spiracy" |
| 1998 | Tempting Fate | Richard Davis | Television Movie |
| 1998 | Chameleon | Cortez, IBI Chief | Television Movie |
| 1998 | The Defenders: Taking the First | John Walker | Television Movie |
| 1998 | ER | Dr. Dan Litvak | Episode: "Masquerade" |
| 1999 | Fantasy Island | unknown | Episode: "Innocent" |
| 1999 | The Practice | Danny Rogers | Episode: "Of Human Bondage" |
| 1999 | Walker, Texas Ranger | Harris | Episode: "Livegirls.now" |
| 1999 | Diagnosis Murder | Grant Connor | Episode: The Seven Deadly Sins" |
| 1999–2000 | Oz | Nikolai Stanislofsky | Recurring Role (13 Episodes) |
| 2000 | Chicken Soup for the Soul | unknown | Episode: "14 Steps/Damaged Goods/Ballerina Dreams" |
| 2000 | Kiss Tomorrow Goodbye | Mackey, Dusin's Boss | Television Movie |
| 2000 | For All Time | Al Glasser | Television Movie |
| 2000–2005 | Strong Medicine | Chief of Staff Dr. Robert Jackson | Recurring Role (108 Episodes); Director (8 Episodes) |
| 2001 | Law & Order: Special Victims Unit | Ilya Korska | Episode: "Pixies" |
| 2002 | The President's Man: A Line in the Sand | Jack Santon | Television Movie |
| 2002 | Frasier | Dr. Bernard Gadston | Episode: "War of the Words" |
| 2002 | Law & Order | Bill Talbot | Episode: "Slaughter" |
| 2005 | Law & Order: Trial by Jury | Assistant District Attorney Nick Forster | Episode: "The Line" |
| 2005–2006 | Monk | —N/a | Director (2 Episodes) |
| 2006 | Without a Trace | Donald Clarence | Episode: "Candy" |
| 2006 | Numb3rs | Maurice Connors | Episode: "Longshot" |
| 2007 | Crossing Jordan | Dr. Sanchez | Episode: "Sleeping Beauty" |
| 2008 | Jane Doe: Eye of the Beholder | Lance Saxon | Television Movie |
| 2009–2010 | Dollhouse | Clive Ambrose | 3 Episodes |
| 2010 | Criminal Minds | James Stanworth | Episode: "25 to Life" |
| 2011 | Law & Order: LA | Bo | Episode: "Zuma Canyon" |
| 2011 | Field of Vision | Kenny McFarland | Television Movie |
| 2011 | The Whole Truth | unknown | Episode: "The End" |
| 2011–2012 | NCIS | Sean Latham | 2 Episodes |
| 2012 | CSI: Crime Scene Investigation | Jonah Clyborn | Episode: "Seeing Red" |
| 2012 | Franklin & Bash | Gleen Friedman | Episode: "Viper" |
| 2012 | Grey's Anatomy | Dr. Mel Barnett | Episode: "Going, Going, Gone" |
| 2013 | Lucky 7 | Charlie | 2 Episodes |
| 2014 | Perception | Gordon Williams | Episode: "Obsession" |
| 2015 | Scream Queens | Steven Munsch | Episode: "Beware of Young Girls" |
| 2016 | Elementary | Jack McGill | Episode: "To Catch a Predator Predator" |
| 2017 | Homeland | Christopher | Episode: "America First" |
| 2017 | Chicago P.D. | Mr. Dowd | Episode: "Grassing for Salvation" |
| 2017 | One Mississippi | Ezra Weiss | Web Series (2 Episodes) |
| 2018 | Madam Secretary | Judge Nathan Mayfield | Episode: "Family Separation: Part 1" |

=== Stage ===
| Year | Title | Role | Notes |
|---|---|---|---|
| 1972–1980 | Grease | Teen Angel / Johnny Casino u/s Danny Zuko (replacement) | Royal Theatre; 20 Performances |
| 1976 | Rockabye Hamlet | Hamlet / Laertes (standby) | Minskoff Theatre; 7 Performances |
| 1988 | Chess | Frederick "Freddie" Trumper, The American | Broadway – Imperial Theatre; 68 Performances; Theatre World Award |
| 1988–1989 | The Devil's Disciple | unknown role (replaced Richard Dudgeon) | Circle in the Square Theatre |
| 1989 | Up Against It | Ian McTurk | Off-Broadway – Joseph Papp Public Theater/ LuEsther Hall; 16 Performances |
| 1990 | Shogun: The Musical | John Blackthorne | Broadway – Marquis Theatre; 72 Performances |
| 2007 | Chicago | Billy Flynn (replacement) | Richard Rodgers Theatre |

== Soundtrack ==
=== Singles ===
| Year | Title | Album |
|---|---|---|
| 1988 | "Freddie's Entrance" | Chess |
| 1988 | "Argument" (with Judy Kuhn) | Chess |
| 1988 | "The American and Florence" (with Judy Kuhn) | Chess |
| 1988 | "One Night in Bangkok" (and Ensemble) | Chess |
| 1988 | "Who'd Ever Think It?" | Chess |
| 1988 | "Winning" (with Dennis Parlato) | Chess |
| 1988 | "Freddie Goes Metal" | Chess |
| 1988 | "Pity the Child" | Chess |
| 1988 | "Endgame" (with Paul Harman, Kurt Johns, Kip Niven, David Carroll and Ensemble) | Chess |
