= J. Smith-Cameron =

American actress

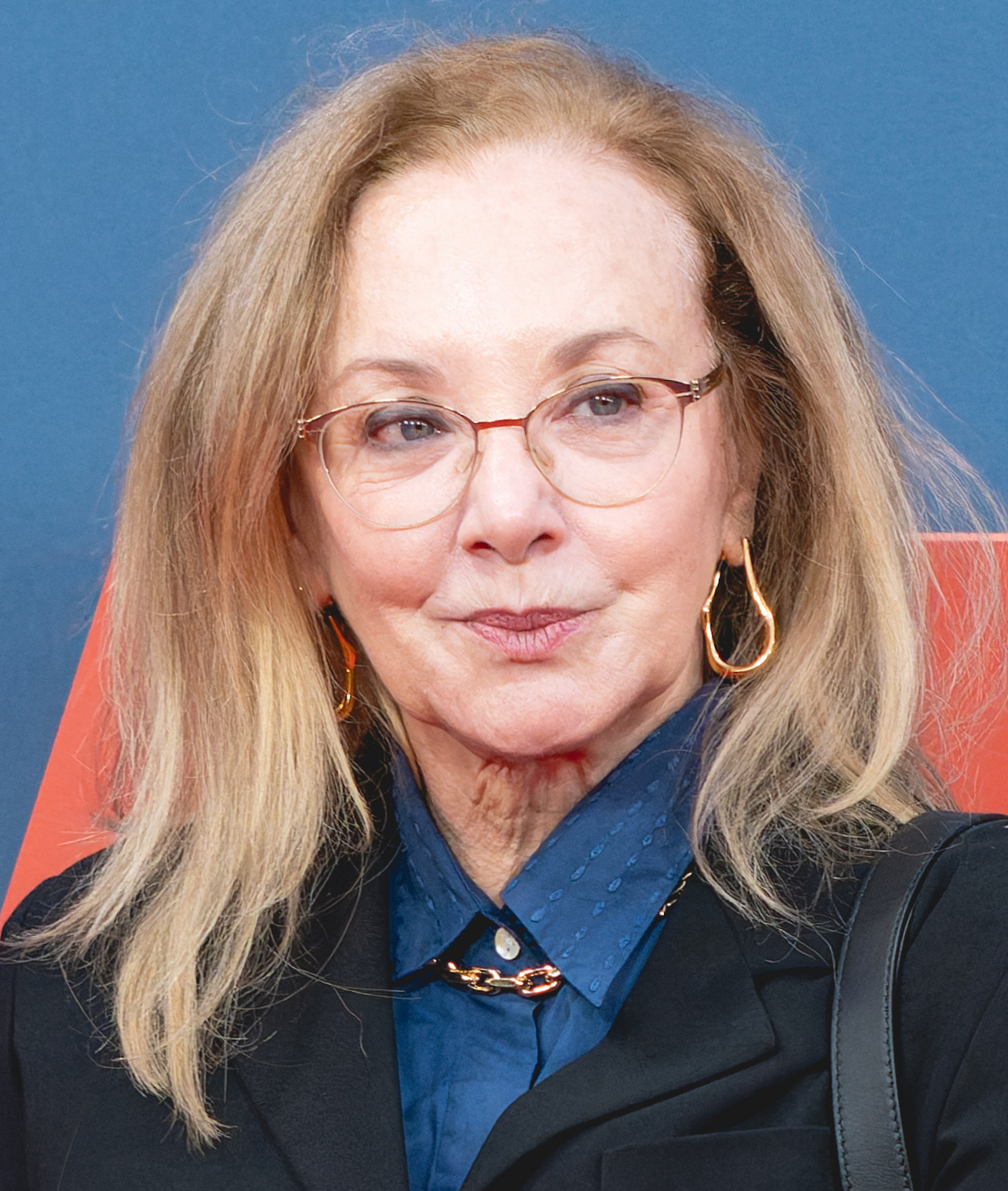
- Smith-Cameron in 2024
- Born: Louisville, Kentucky, U.S.
- Other name: J. Smith
- Education: Florida State University
- Occupation: Actress
- Years active: 1979–present
- Spouse: Kenneth Lonergan (m. 2000)
- Children: 1

Jeannie Smith-Cameron is an American actress. She gained prominence for her roles as Janet Talbot in the Sundance TV series Rectify (2013–2016) and Gerri Kellman in the HBO series Succession (2018–2023), the latter of which earned her two Primetime Emmy Award nominations.

She spent a majority of her career in theatre, making her Broadway debut in the 1982 Beth Henley play Crimes of the Heart. She went on to receive a Tony Award for Best Featured Actress in a Play nomination for the Timberlake Wertenbaker play Our Country's Good (1989). She was also nominated for the Drama Desk Award for Outstanding Actress in a Play for Seán O'Casey's Juno and the Paycock (2014).

For her role in the film Nancy (2018), she was nominated for the Independent Spirit Award for Best Supporting Female. Her other notable films include 84 Charing Cross Road (1987), Mighty Aphrodite (1995), Sabrina (1995), In & Out (1997), You Can Count on Me (2000), Margaret (2011), and Christine (2016). She also appeared in the television series True Blood (2010–2011), Divorce (2016–2018), Search Party (2017–2020), and Fleishman Is in Trouble (2022).

== Early life and education ==
Smith was born in Louisville, Kentucky, the daughter of architect Richard Sharp Smith and granddaughter of architect Richard Sharp Smith.

She attended Florida State University for one year and was enrolled in its School of Theatre, where she met film director Victor Nuñez, who cast her as a lead in his film Gal Young 'Un (1979). She also studied acting at HB Studio in New York City.

She began being credited as "J. Smith" in college out of concern that her first name, Jeannie, was too girlish. She added a family name, Cameron, when the Actors' Equity Association told her there was already a J. Smith, and there was a rule that two actors could not have the same professional name.

== Career ==
She made her Broadway debut in August 1982, replacing Mia Dillon as Babe Botrelle in Crimes of the Heart. She appeared as Maggie in the original Broadway cast of Lend Me a Tenor in 1989. The cast of that play won an Outer Critics Circle Award, Special Awards. She appeared in the Broadway production of Our Country's Good in 1991, where she was nominated for a Tony Award for Best Featured Actress in a Play. She won an Obie Award for the Off-Broadway Drama Department production As Bees in Honey Drown (1997), which also earned her a Drama Desk nomination and Outer Critics Circle Award nomination for Outstanding Actress In A Play. She was also nominated for a Drama Desk Award for Sarah, Sarah (2004).

Her other Broadway credits include Night Must Fall (1999), Tartuffe (2002), and After the Night and the Music (2005). She has appeared in many Off-Broadway plays, including at the Public Theater, the Second Stage Theatre and Playwrights Horizons. She appeared in the Paul Rudnick play The Naked Truth Off-Broadway at the WPA Theatre in 1994, for which she received a Drama Desk Award nomination.

From November 1999 through April 2000, she appeared as Clare in Fuddy Meers at New York City Center, Stage II, for which she was nominated for the Outer Critics Circle Award as Outstanding Actress in a Play. In March through June 2004, she appeared in the Manhattan Theatre Club Off-Broadway production of Sarah, Sarah. In November through December 2009, she appeared Off-Broadway at the Acorn Theatre in her husband Kenneth Lonergan's play The Starry Messenger. From October 2013 to December 2013, she starred in the Off-Broadway Irish Repertory Theater production of Juno and the Paycock as Juno Boyle. The New York Times' theatre critic Charles Isherwood wrote: "In one of the finest performances of her distinguished career on the New York stage, Ms. Smith-Cameron imbues her Juno with a steely pragmatism, but more important an emotional pliancy that makes her more prepared than the rest of her clan to beat back the onslaughts of ill fortune that beset them."

Smith-Cameron later transitioned to more film and television roles to focus on her family. She portrayed seven different characters in all three primary shows of the Law & Order franchise. She played Janet Talbot, the mother of a death row inmate, in Sundance TV's Rectify for four seasons. She played lawyer Gerri Kellman, a role originally written for a man, on the HBO series Succession (2018–2023). The role earned her nominations for two Primetime Emmy Award for Outstanding Supporting Actress in a Drama Series. In 2023, she acted in a revival of the play Love Letters opposite Victor Garber at the Irish Repertory Theatre. She acted in a limited engagement from September 19 to 24. In 2024, she made her West End debut in the revival of Juno and the Paycock opposite Mark Rylance at the Gielgud Theatre.

== Personal life ==
Smith-Cameron is married to playwright, screenwriter, and film director Kenneth Lonergan. They have one daughter.

== Acting credits ==
=== Film ===
Key
| † | Denotes works filming or post-production |

J. Smith-Cameron film credits
| Year | Title | Role | Notes |
|---|---|---|---|
| 1979 | Gal Young Un | Elly | |
| 1987 | 84 Charing Cross Road | Ginny | |
| 1992 | That Night | Carol Bloom | |
| 1994 | She Led Two Lives | Angela Anderson | |
| 1995 | Jeffrey | Sharon | |
| 1995 | Mighty Aphrodite | Bud's Wife | |
| 1995 | A Modern Affair | Diane | |
| 1995 | Let It Be Me | Clarice | |
| 1995 | Sabrina | Carol | |
| 1996 | Harriet the Spy | Mrs. Welsch | |
| 1996 | The First Wives Club | Miss Sullivan | |
| 1996 | The Proprietor | New York - Texans | |
| 1997 | Arresting Gena | Caroline Lee | |
| 1997 | In & Out | Trina Paxton | |
| 1999 | The Rage: Carrie 2 | Barbara Lang | |
| 2000 | You Can Count on Me | Mabel | |
| 2005 | Bittersweet Place | Violet | |
| 2006 | A Very Serious Person | Carol | |
| 2011 | Margaret | Joan Cohen | |
| 2012 | Man on a Ledge | Psychiatrist | |
| 2014 | Like Sunday, Like Rain | Mary | |
| 2016 | Christine | Peg Chubbuck | |
| 2016 | No Pay, Nudity | Debra | |
| 2018 | Nancy | Ellen Lynch | |
| 2022 | Vengeance | Sharon Shaw | |
| 2022 | The Year Between | Sherri Miller | |
| 2024 | Turtles All the Way Down | Professor Abbott | |

=== Television ===
Key
| † | Denotes television productions that have not yet been released |

J. Smith-Cameron television credits
| Year | Title | Role | Notes |
|---|---|---|---|
| 1984–1985 | Guiding Light | Nancy Ferris | Unknown episodes |
| 1985, 1987–1988 | The Equalizer | Vanessa | Episode: "Mama's Boy" |
| 1985, 1987–1988 | The Equalizer | Susan Foxworth | Episode: "Regrets Only" |
| 1985, 1987–1988 | The Equalizer | Natalie Santelli | Episode: "The Sins of Our Fathers" |
| 1987 | Wayside School | Miss Butterfield | TV special |
| 1990 | H.E.L.P. | Mrs. Perry | Episode: "Fire Down Below" |
| 1990–1991 | The Days and Nights of Molly Dodd | Ramona Luchesse | 12 episodes |
| 1992, 1998, 2003, 2009 | Law & Order | Ms. Moskowitz | Episode: "Severance" |
| 1992, 1998, 2003, 2009 | Law & Order | Paula Downing | Episode: "Flight" |
| 1992, 1998, 2003, 2009 | Law & Order | Linda Drosi | Episode: "Blaze" |
| 1992, 1998, 2003, 2009 | Law & Order | Attorney Ward | Episode: "Take-Out" |
| 1996 | Homicide: Life on the Street | Avis Griffin | Episode: "Sniper: Part 2" |
| 1996 | Spin City | Lisa | Episode: "The Competition" |
| 1998 | American Experience | Mrs. Howard | Episode: "A Midwife's Tale" |
| 2001, 2007 | Law & Order: Criminal Intent | Trudy Pomeranski | Episode: "Poison" |
| 2001, 2007 | Law & Order: Criminal Intent | Miss Hill | Episode: "Endgame" |
| 2003 | K Street | Tommy's Wife | 3 episodes |
| 2007 | Six Degrees | Maggie Newton | 2 episodes |
| 2008 | Canterbury's Law | Elissa Shapiro | Episode: "Sweet Sixteen" |
| 2010 | The Big C | Vivian | Episode: "Playing the Cancer Card" |
| 2010–2011 | True Blood | Melinda Mickens | 9 episodes |
| 2011 | Law & Order: Special Victims Unit | Diane Eskas | Episode: "Educated Guess" |
| 2013–2016 | Rectify | Janet Talbot | 30 episodes |
| 2014 | Madam Secretary | Alice Millevoi | Episode: "Collateral Damage" |
| 2015 | The Good Wife | Samara Steel | Episode: "Restraint" |
| 2016–2018 | Divorce | Elaine Campbell | 3 episodes |
| 2017–2020 | Search Party | Mary Ferguson | 7 episodes |
| 2018 | Mozart in the Jungle | Amy Rutledge | Episode: "If I Was an Elf, I Would Tell You" |
| 2018–2023 | Succession | Gerri Kellman | Series regular |
| 2022 | Fleishman Is in Trouble | Barbara Hiller | Episode: "God, What an Idiot He Was!" |
| 2023 | Waco: The Aftermath | Lois Roden | 4 episodes |
| 2023 | Teenage Euthanasia | Marnie (voice) | Episode: "Mother's Day" |
| 2024 | In the Know | Barb (voice) | 6 episodes |
| 2024–2026 | Hacks | Kathy Vance | 5 episodes |
| 2025 | Murdaugh: Death in the Family | Marian Proctor | Miniseries |
| 2026 | Elsbeth | Isadora "Izzy" Langford | Episode: "Deadutante" |
| TBA | Seven Sisters † | Francesca | Main role |

=== Theatre ===
J. Smith-Cameron theatre credits
| Year | Title | Role | Venue | Theatre |
|---|---|---|---|---|
| 1982 | Crimes of the Heart | Babe Botrelle (replacement) | Broadway | John Golden Theatre |
| 1983 | The Knack | Nancy | Off-Broadway | 23rd Street Theater |
| 1985 | The Voice of the Turtle | Sally Middleton | Off-Broadway | Union Square Theatre |
| 1985 | Alice and Fred | Alice Mitchell | Off-Broadway | Cherry Lane Theatre |
| 1986 | Women of Manhattan | Rhonda | Off-Broadway | New York City Center |
| 1986 | Wild Honey | Marya Yerfimovna Grekova | Broadway | Virginia Theatre |
| 1989 | Lend Me a Tenor | Maggie | Broadway | Royale Theatre |
| 1989 | Our Country's Good | 2nd Lt. William Faddy, Dabby Bryant | Broadway | Nederlander Theatre |
| 1990 | Mi Vida Loca | Diana | Off-Broadway | New York City Center |
| 1992 | Little Egypt | Bernadette Waltz | Off-Broadway | Playwrights Horizons |
| 1992 | The Real Inspector Hound and The Fifteen Minute Hamlet | Felicity; Ophelia | Broadway | Criterion Center Stage Right |
| 1992 | On The Bum, Or The Next Train Through | Norma | Off-Broadway | Playwrights Horizons |
| 1993 | Traps | Christie | Off-Broadway | New York Theatre Workshop |
| 1993 | Owners | Marion | Off-Broadway | New York Theatre Workshop |
| 1993 | Desdemona: A Play About a Handkerchief | Desdemona | Off-Broadway | Circle Repertory Theatre |
| 1994 | The Naked Truth | Sissy Bermiss Darnley | Off-Broadway | WPA Theatre |
| 1995 | Don Juan in Chicago | Dona Elvira | Off-Broadway | Primary Stages |
| 1995 | The Play's the Thing | Ilona Szabo | Broadway | Criterion Center Stage Right |
| 1996 | Blue Window | Libby | Off-Broadway | New York City Center |
| 1997 | As Bees In Honey Drown | Alexa Vere de Vere | Off-Broadway | Lucille Lortel Theatre |
| 1999 | The Memory of Water | Mary | Off-Broadway | New York City Center |
| 1999 | Night Must Fall | Olivia Grayne | Broadway | Lyceum Theatre |
| 1999 | Tartuffe | Elmire | Off-Broadway | Delacorte Theater |
| 1999 | Fuddy Meers | Claire | Off-Broadway | New York City Center |
| 2001 | Music from a Sparkling Planet | Tamara Tomorrow | Off-Broadway | Greenwich House Theatre |
| 2003 | Tartuffe | Dorine | Broadway | American Airlines Theatre |
| 2004 | Sarah, Sarah | Sarah Grosberg, Jeannie Grosberg | Off-Broadway | New York City Center |
| 2004 | The God of Hell | Emma | Off-Broadway | Actors Studio Drama School Theatre |
| 2005 | After the Night and the Music | Gloria, Kathleen, Mitzi Grade | Broadway | Biltmore Theatre |
| 2006 | Pen | Helen | Off-Broadway | Playwrights Horizons |
| 2008 | Good Boys and True | Elizabeth | Off-Broadway | Second Stage Theatre |
| 2009 | The Starry Messenger | Anne Williams | Off-Broadway | Theatre Three |
| 2010 | That Hopey Changey Thing | Jane Apple Halls | Off-Broadway | Anspacher Theater |
| 2011 | Sweet and Sad | Jane Apple Halls | Off-Broadway | Anspacher Theater |
| 2012 | The Maids | Madame | Off-Broadway | Theater at St. Clement's |
| 2012 | Sorry | Jane Apple Halls | Off-Broadway | Anspacher Theater |
| 2013 | Juno and the Paycock | Juno Boyle | Off-Broadway | Irish Repertory Theatre |
| 2015 | Dear Elizabeth | Elizabeth (replacement) | Off-Broadway | McGinn/Cazale Theater |
| 2018 | Peace for Mary Frances | Alice | Off-Broadway | Alice Griffin Jewel Box Theatre |
| 2023 | Love Letters | Melissa Gardner | Off-Broadway | Irish Repertory Theatre |
| 2024 | Juno and the Paycock | Juno Boyle | West End debut | Gielgud Theatre, London |

=== Music videos ===
| Year | Title | Artist | Note |
|---|---|---|---|
| 2023 | "Say It Like You Mean It" | Sleater-Kinney | Lead role |

== Awards and nominations ==
| Year | Association | Category | Work | Result | Ref. |
|---|---|---|---|---|---|
| 1991 | Tony Award | Best Featured Actress in a Play | Our Country's Good | Nominated | |
| 1995 | Drama Desk Award | Outstanding Featured Actress in a Play | The Naked Truth | Nominated | |
| 1998 | Drama Desk Award | Outstanding Actress in a Play | As Bees In Honey Drown | Nominated | |
| 1998 | Obie Award | Distinguished Performance by an Actress | As Bees In Honey Drown | Won | |
| 1998 | Outer Critics Circle Award | Outstanding Actress in a Play | As Bees In Honey Drown | Nominated | |
| 2000 | Outer Critics Circle Award | Outstanding Actress in a Play | Fuddy Meers | Nominated | |
| 2004 | Drama Desk Award | Outstanding Actress in a Play | Sarah, Sarah | Nominated | |
| 2012 | Drama Desk Award | Outstanding Ensemble | Sweet and Sad | Won | |
| 2012 | Obie Award | Distinguished Performance by an Ensemble | Sweet and Sad | Won | |
| 2014 | Drama Desk Award | Outstanding Actress in a Play | Juno and the Paycock | Nominated | |
| 2019 | Independent Spirit Award | Best Supporting Actress | Nancy | Nominated | |
| 2022 | Primetime Emmy Award | Outstanding Supporting Actress in a Drama Series | Succession | Nominated | |
| 2022 | Screen Actors Guild Award | Outstanding Ensemble in a Drama Series | Succession | Won | |
| 2022 | Critics Choice Award | Best Supporting Actress in a Drama Series | Succession | Nominated | |
| 2022 | Hollywood Critics Association | Best Supporting Actress in a Drama Series | Succession | Nominated | |
| 2023 | Primetime Emmy Award | Outstanding Supporting Actress in a Drama Series | Succession | Nominated | |
| 2023 | Golden Globe Awards | Best Supporting Actress – Series, Miniseries or Television Film | Succession | Nominated | |
| 2024 | Screen Actors Guild Awards | Outstanding Performance by an Ensemble in a Drama Series | Succession | Won | |
