= American Playhouse =

Anthology television series

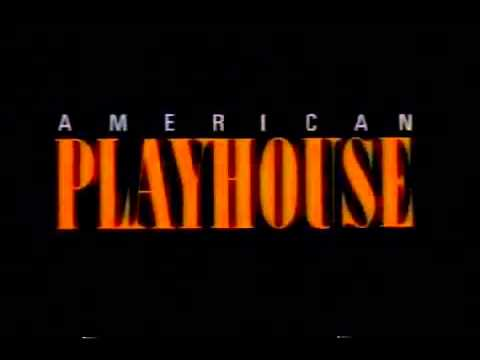
- Genre: Anthology
- Directed by: Perry Miller Adato; Robert Allan Ackerman; Paul Bogart; Kirk Browning; Jonathan Demme; Bill Duke; Peter H. Hunt; David Hugh Jones; Barbara Kopple; Jack O'Brien; Philip Leacock; Marshall W. Mason; Vivian Matalon; Sharron Miller; Joanne Woodward
- Composer: David Amram
- Country of origin: United States
- Original language: English
- No. of seasons: 13

Production
- Executive producer: David M. Davis
- Producer: Lindsay Law
- Production companies: KCET; South Carolina Educational Television; WGBH; WNET

Original release
- Network: PBS
- Release: January 12, 1982 – September 29, 1996

American Playhouse is an American anthology television series periodically broadcast by Public Broadcasting Service (PBS).

== Background ==
It premiered on January 12, 1982, with The Shady Hill Kidnapping, written and narrated by John Cheever and directed by Paul Bogart. Its final broadcast, a television version of Stephen Sondheim and James Lapine's Broadway musical Passion, aired on September 29, 1996.

The series proved to be a springboard for the careers of numerous performers, including David Marshall Grant, Laura Linney, A Martinez, Conchata Ferrell, Eric Roberts, Lynne Thigpen, John Malkovich, Peter Riegert, Lupe Ontiveros, Ben Stiller, and Megan Mullally.

As part of WGBH's development of the Descriptive Video Service (DVS), American Playhouse was one of the first American television programs to air with audio description for the visually impaired on the Secondary audio program (SAP). After trialing the system during previous seasons, the 1990 season was the first to offer it as part of their wider rollout of DVS, initially through 32 member stations.

In 1994, the series announced an ambitious joint venture with The Samuel Goldwyn Company, in which American Playhouse would produce theatrical motion pictures that would be released by Goldwyn. Those films included Angels and Insects (1995), Reckless (1995), Palookaville (1995), My Family (1995), and I Shot Andy Warhol (1996). However, the series was cancelled before any of the films aired on PBS.

== Episodes ==
=== Season 1 (1982) ===
| No. in season | Title | Directed by | Written by | Original release date |
|---|---|---|---|---|
| 1 | "The Shady Hill Kidnapping" | Paul Bogart | John Cheever | January 12, 1982 |
| 2 | "King of America" | Dezső Magyar | B.J Merholz | January 19, 1982 |
| 3 | "Seguin" | Jesús Salvador Treviño | Jesús Salvador Treviño | January 26, 1982 |
| 4 | "Who Am I This Time?" | Jonathan Demme | Neal Miller, based on the short story by Kurt Vonnegut | February 2, 1982 |
| 5 | "Any Friend of Nicholas Nickleby Is a Friend of Mine" | Ralph Rosenblum | Mary Trimble, based on the story by Ray Bradbury | February 9, 1982 |
| 6 | "Come Along with Me" | Joanne Woodward | June Finfer, Neal Miller and Joanne Woodward, based on the unfinished novel by Shirley Jackson | February 16, 1982 |
| 7 | "For Colored Girls Who Have Considered Suicide / When the Rainbow Is Enuf" | Oz Scott | Ntozake Shange, based on her stage play | February 23, 1982 |
| 8 | "Carl Sandburg: Echoes and Silences" | Perry Miller Adato | Paul Shyre, based on poems by Carl Sandburg | March 2, 1982 |
| 9 | "Fifth of July" | Kirk Browning; Marshall W. Mason | Lanford Wilson, based on his stage play | March 9, 1982 |
| 10 | "The Great American Fourth of July and Other Disasters" | Richard Bartlett | Jean Shepherd, based on his work In God We Trust: All Others Pay Cash | March 16, 1982 |
| 11 | "Pilgrim, Farewell" | Michael Roemer | Michael Roemer | March 23, 1982 |
| 12 | "Northern Lights" | John Hanson; Rob Nilsson | John Hanson and Rob Nilsson | March 30, 1982 |
| 13 | "Medal of Honor Rag" | Lloyd Richards | Tom Cole, based on his stage play | April 6, 1982 |
| 14 | "Working" | Stephen Schwartz and Kirk Browning | Stephen Schwartz and Nina Faso, based on their musical | April 13, 1982 |
| 15 | "Weekend" | Paul Bogart | Ann Beattie, based on her short story | April 20, 1982 |
| 16 | "Private Contentment" | Vivian Matalon | Reynolds Price | April 27, 1982 |
| 17 | "My Palikari" | Charles S. Dubin | George Kirgo and Leon Capetanos | May 4, 1982 |
| 18 | "Oppenheimer (1)" | Barry Davis | Peter Prince | May 11, 1982 |
| 19 | "Oppenheimer (2)" | Barry Davis | Peter Prince | May 18, 1982 |
| 20 | "Oppenheimer (3)" | Barry Davis | Peter Prince | May 25, 1982 |
| 21 | "Oppenheimer (4)" | Barry Davis | Peter Prince | June 1, 1982 |
| 22 | "Oppenheimer (5)" | Barry Davis | Peter Prince | June 8, 1982 |
| 23 | "Oppenheimer (6)" | Barry Davis | Peter Prince | June 15, 1982 |
| 24 | "Oppenheimer (7)" | Barry Davis | Peter Prince | June 22, 1982 |
| 25 | "The Ballad of Gregorio Cortez" | Robert M. Young | Victor Villaseñor and Robert M. Young, based on the book With His Pistol in His Hand by Américo Paredes | June 29, 1982 |

=== Season 2 (1983) ===
| No. in season | Title | Directed by | Written by | Original release date |
|---|---|---|---|---|
| 1 | "The Skin of Our Teeth" | Jack O'Brien | Thorton Wilder | January 18, 1983 |
| 2 | "Miss Lonelyhearts" | Michael Dinner | Robert E. Bailey and Michael Dinner, based on the novel by Nathaniel West | January 25, 1983 |
| 3 | "Family Business" | John Stix | Dick Goldberg, based on his stage play | February 1, 1983 |
| 4 | "Keeping On" | Barbara Kopple | Horton Foote | February 8, 1983 |
| 5 | "The File on Jill Hatch (1)" | Alastair Reid | Kenneth Cavander | February 15, 1983 |
| 6 | "The File on Jill Hatch (2)" | Alastair Reid | Kenneth Cavander | February 22, 1983 |
| 7 | "The File on Jill Hatch (3)" | Alastair Reid | Alex Mount | March 1, 1983 |
| 8 | "For Us the Living: The Medgar Evers Story" | Michael Schultz | Ossie Davis and J. Rotcop, based on the book by Myrlie Evers-Williams and William Peters | March 22, 1983 |
| 9 | "Verse Person Singular" | Robert Deubel | created by Richard Kiley | March 29, 1983 |
| 10 | "Until She Talks" | Mary Lampson | Doris Baizley | April 5, 1983 |
| 11 | "Wings" | John Madden | Arthur Kopit, based on his stage play | April 26, 1983 |
| 12 | "The Rothko Conspiracy" | Paul Watson | Michael Baker | May 3, 1983 |

=== Season 3 (1984) ===
| No. in season | Title | Directed by | Written by | Original release date |
|---|---|---|---|---|
| 1 | "The Ghost Writer" | Tristram Powell | Tristram Powell and Philip Roth, based on the novel by Roth | January 17, 1984 |
| 2 | "Pudd'nhead Wilson" | Alan Bridges | Philip H. Reisman Jr., based on the novel by Mark Twain | January 24, 1984 |
| 3 | "True West" | Allan Goldstein and Gary Sinise | Sam Shepard, based on his stage play | January 31, 1984 |
| 4 | "Nothing but a Man" | Michael Roemer | Michael Roemer and Robert M. Young | February 7, 1984 |
| 5 | "Popular Neurotics" | Sheldon Larry | Aubrey Wertheim, based on his stage play | February 14, 1984 |
| 6 | "The Cafeteria" | Amram Nowak | Ernest Kinoy, based on the short story by Isaac Bashevis Singer | February 21, 1984 |
| 7 | "Refuge" | Huck Fairman | Huck Fairman and Luther Sperberg | February 28, 1984 |
| 8 | "The Gin Game" | Terry Hughes | Donald L. Coburn, based on his stage play | March 6, 1984 |
| 9 | "Haunted" | Michael Roemer | Michael Roemer | March 20, 1984 |
| 10 | "The Killing Floor" | Bill Duke | Leslie Lee | April 10, 1984 |
| 11 | "Heartland" | Richard Pearce | Beth Ferris and William Kittredge, based on the letters of Elinore Pruitt Stewart | April 17, 1984 |
| 12 | "City News" | David Fishelson and Zoe Zinman | David Fishelson and Zoe Zinman | April 24, 1984 |
| 13 | "Hughie" | Terry Hughes and José Quintero | Eugene O'Neill | May 1, 1984 |
| 14 | "Concealed Enemies (1)" | Jeff Bleckner | Hugh Whitemore | May 7, 1984 |
| 15 | "Concealed Enemies (2)" | Jeff Bleckner | Hugh Whitemore | May 7, 1984 |
| 16 | "Concealed Enemies (3)" | Jeff Bleckner | Hugh Whitemore | May 8, 1984 |
| 17 | "Concealed Enemies (4)" | Jeff Bleckner | Hugh Whitemore | May 9, 1984 |

=== Season 4 (1984–1985) ===
| No. in season | Title | Directed by | Written by | Original release date |
|---|---|---|---|---|
| 1 | "Testament" | Lynne Littman | John Sacret Young, based on the short story "The Last Testament" by Carol Amen | November 26, 1984 |
| 2 | "A Matter of Principle" | Gwen Arner | Morton Neal Miller and Nancy Miller, based on the short story by John D. Weaver | December 3, 1984 |
| 3 | "Solomon Northup's Odyssey" | Gordon Parks | Lou Potter and Samm-Art Williams, based on the autobiography Twelve Years a Slave by Solomon Northup | December 10, 1984 |
| 4 | "Tomorrow" | Joseph Anthony | Horton Foote, based on his stage play | December 17, 1984 |
| 5 | "Go Tell It on the Mountain" | Stan Lathan | Gus Edwards and Leslie Lee, based on the novel by James Baldwin | January 14, 1985 |
| 6 | "Noon Wine" | Michael Fields | Michael Fields, based on the novel by Katherine Anne Porter | January 21, 1985 |
| 7 | "The Joy That Kills" | Tina Rathborne | Tina Rathborne and Nancy Dyer, based on the short story "The Story of an Hour" by Kate Chopin | January 28, 1985 |
| 8 | "Overdrawn at the Memory Bank" | Douglas Williams | Corinne Jacker, based on the short story by John Varley | February 4, 1985 |
| 9 | "The Star-Crossed Romance of Josephine Cosnowski" | Fred Barzyk | Jean Shepherd, based on his work In God We Trust: All Others Pay Cash | February 11, 1985 |
| 10 | "Some Men Need Help" | Allan Goldstein | John Ford Noonan, based on his play | February 18, 1985 |
| 11 | "Charlotte Forten's Mission: Experiment in Freedom" | Barry Crane | Samm-Art Williams | February 25, 1985 |
| 12 | "Breakfast with Les and Bess" | Perry Rosemond | Lee Kalcheim | March 11, 1985 |
| 13 | "Nightsongs" | Marva Nabili | Marva Nabili, based on journal entries by Fae Myenne Ng | April 15, 1985 |
| 14 | "Under the Biltmore Clock" | Neal Miller | Neal Miller and Ilene Cooper, based on the short story by F. Scott Fitzgerald | April 22, 1985 |
| 15 | "Displaced Person" | Alan Bridges | Fred Barron, based on the short story by Kurt Vonnegut | May 6, 1985 |
| 16 | "The Europeans" | James Ivory | Ruth Prawer Jhabvala, based on the novel by Henry James | May 13, 1985 |
| 17 | "El Norte" | Gregory Nava | Gregory Nava and Anna Thomas | May 20, 1985 |
| 18 | "Three Sovereigns for Sarah (1)" | Philip Leacock | Victor Pisano | May 27, 1985 |
| 19 | "Three Sovereigns for Sarah (2)" | Philip Leacock | Victor Pisano | June 3, 1985 |
| 20 | "Three Sovereigns for Sarah (3)" | Philip Leacock | Victor Pisano | June 10, 1985 |
| 21 | "Paper Angels" | John Lone | Genny Lim, based on her stage play | June 17, 1985 |
| 22 | "Cat on a Hot Tin Roof" | Jack Hofsiss | Tennessee Williams, based on his stage play | June 24, 1985 |

=== Season 5 (1986) ===
| No. in season | Title | Directed by | Written by | Original release date |
|---|---|---|---|---|
| 1 | "The Rise and Rise of Daniel Rocket" | Emile Ardolino | Peter Parnell, based on his stage play | January 20, 1986 |
| 2 | "The Roommate" | Nell Cox | Morton Neal Miller, based on the short story "The Christian Roommates" by John Updike | January 27, 1986 |
Two young men who are polar opposites are assigned to the same dorm room at Northwestern University in 1952.
| 3 | "Valentine's Revenge" | Paul Saltzman | Paul M. Lally, based on the short story by O. Henry | February 3, 1986 |
| 4 | "Adventures of Huckleberry Finn (1)" | Peter H. Hunt | Guy Gallo, based on the novel by Mark Twain | February 10, 1986 |
| 5 | "Adventures of Huckleberry Finn (2)" | Peter H. Hunt | Guy Gallo, based on the novel by Mark Twain | February 17, 1986 |
| 6 | "Adventures of Huckleberry Finn (3)" | Peter H. Hunt | Guy Gallo, based on the novel by Mark Twain | February 24, 1986 |
| 7 | "Adventures of Huckleberry Finn (4)" | Peter H. Hunt | Guy Gallo, based on the novel by Mark Twain | March 3, 1986 |
| 8 | "Tell Me a Riddle" | Lee Grant | Joyce Eliason and Alev Lytle, based on the novella by Tillie Olsen | March 17, 1986 |
An elderly couple who are frustrated with each other about how to spend their last years of life decide to travel across the USA and visit their children and grandchildren.
| 9 | "The Little Sister" | Jan Egleson | Jan Egleson | April 7, 1986 |
| 10 | "The House of Ramon Iglesia" | Luis F. Soto | José Rivera | April 14, 1986 |
Ramón Iglesia plans to retire from his janitorial job, sell his suburban Long Island home and return to Puerto Rico with his wife and three sons, but does not hold the deed to his house which was purchased through an oral contract. Javier, his oldest son, refuses to return to Puerto Rico and chastises him for his unsophisticated approach to legal matters, but eventually has a change of heart and decides to help.
| 11 | "A Flash of Green" | Victor Nunez | Victor Nuñez, based on the novel by John D. MacDonald | April 21, 1986 |
| 12 | "Damien" | Nino J. Martin | Aldyth Morris | April 28, 1986 |
A 19th century Roman Catholic priest who worked with lepers on the island of Molokai discusses his experiences there.
| 13 | "Rocket to the Moon" | John Jacobs | Wesley Moore, Clifford Odets | May 5, 1986 |
In 1938 New York, a middle-aged dentist's practice is failing and his marriage is on the rocks. He becomes withdrawn until he starts getting involved with his lively assistant, a free spirit with a penchant for tall tales and a hidden loneliness. After receiving encouragement from his own father-in-law, the two find comfort in each other.
| 14 | "A Case of Libel" | Eric Till | Henry Denker, Louis Nizer | May 12, 1986 |
In 1954, a news reporter sues a columnist for libel for proclaiming him a communist in print.
| 15 | "Painting Churches" | Jack O'Brien | Tina Howe | May 19, 1986 |
An examination of the relationship between an artist daughter and her aging parents.
| 16 | "Roanoak (1)" | Jan Egleson | Dina Harris, James K. McCarthy | May 26, 1986 |
| 17 | "Roanoak (2)" | Jan Egleson | Dina Harris, James K. McCarthy | June 2, 1986 |
| 18 | "Roanoak (3)" | Jan Egleson | Dina Harris, James K. McCarthy | June 9, 1986 |
| 19 | "Sunday in the Park with George" | Terry Hughes | James Lapine, Stephen Sondheim | June 16, 1986 |
A fictionalized Georges Seurat paints his lover, Dot, and "A Sunday Afternoon on the Island of La Grande Jatte."

=== Season 6 (1987) ===
| No. in season | Title | Directed by | Written by | Original release date |
|---|---|---|---|---|
| 1 | "All My Sons" | Jack O'Brien | Arthur Miller | January 19, 1987 |
| 2 | "The Prodigious Hickey" | Robert Iscove | Jan Jaffe Kahn, based on the novel by Owen Johnson | January 26, 1987 |
| 3 | "The Wide Net" | Anthony Herrera | Anthony Herrera, based on the story by Eudora Welty | February 2, 1987 |
| 4 | "Smooth Talk" | Joyce Chopra | Tom Cole, based on a story by Joyce Carol Oates | February 9, 1987 |
| 5 | "A Mistaken Charity" | Chuck Portz | Lawrence DuKore & Chuck Portz, adapted from the story by Mary Wilkins Freeman | February 16, 1987 |
| 6 | "Dim Sum: A Little Bit of Heart" | Wayne Wang | Terrel Seltzer | March 2, 1987 |
| 7 | "Eleanor: In Her Own Words" | Mark Cullingham | Russell Vandenbroucke | March 9, 1987 |
A one-women show with Lee Remick as Eleanor Roosevelt
| 8 | "Story of a Marriage: Courtship (1)" | Howard Cummings | Horton Foote | April 6, 1987 |
| 9 | "Story of a Marriage: 1918 (2)" | Ken Harrison | Horton Foote | April 13, 1987 |
| 10 | "Story of a Marriage: On Valentine's Day (3)" | Ken Harrison | Horton Foote | April 13, 1987 |
| 11 | "A Case of Libel" | Eric Till | Henry Denker, based on the book by Louis Nizer | May 4, 1987 |
| 12–1 | "Charley's Aunt" | William Asher | Ron Friedman, based on the play by Brandon Thomas | May 11, 1987 |
| 13 | "Gal Young 'Un" | Victor Nuñez | Victor Nuñez, based on the story by Marjorie Kinnan Rawlings | May 18, 1987 |
| 14 | "The House of Blue Leaves" | Kirk Browning | John Guare | May 25, 1987 |
| 15 | "Blue Window" | Norman René | Craig Lucas | June 1, 1987 |
| 16 | "Dottie" | David Gelfand | Bruce Gelfand | June 8, 1987 |
| 17 | "Waiting for the Moon" | Jill Godmilow | Mark Magill, based on a story by Jill Godmilow & Mark Magill | June 15, 1987 |

=== Season 7 (1988) ===
| No. in season | Title | Directed by | Written by | Original release date |
|---|---|---|---|---|
| 1 | "Strange Interlude (1)" | Herbert Wise | Robert Enders, based on the play by Eugene O’Neill | January 18, 1988 |
| 2 | "Strange Interlude (2)" | Herbert Wise | Robert Enders, based on the play by Eugene O’Neill | January 19, 1988 |
| 3 | "Strange Interlude (3)" | Herbert Wise | Robert Enders, based on the play by Eugene O’Neill | January 20, 1988 |
| 4 | "The Return of Hickey" | Allan A. Goldstein | Jan Jaffe Kahn, based on the novel by Owen Johnson | February 3, 1988 |
| 5 | "Lemon Sky" | Jan Egleson | Lanford Wilson | February 10, 1988 |
| 6 | "The Revolt of Mother" | Victor Lobl | Cynthia A. Cherbak, adapted from the story by Mary E. Wilkins Freeman | February 17, 1988 |
| 7 | "Pigeon Feathers" | Sharron Miller | Jan Hartman | February 17, 1988 |
| 8 | "Billy Galvin" | John Gray | John Gray | February 24, 1988 |
| 9 | "A Flash of Green" | Victor Nuñez | Victor Nuñez, based on the novel by John D. MacDonald | March 23, 1988 |
| 10 | "Journey Into Genius" | Calvin Skaggs | Lanie Robertson | April 6, 1988 |
| 11 | "Suspicion" | Andrew Grieve | Jonathan Lynn and Barry Levinson from the 1941 screenplay | April 20, 1988 |
| 12 | "The Trial of Bernard Goetz" | Harry Moses | Harry Moses | May 11, 1988 |
| 13 | "The Land of Little Rain" | Evelyn Purcell | Doris Baizley | June 1, 1988 |
| 14 | "I Never Sang for My Father" | Jack O'Brien | Robert Anderson | June 15, 1988 |
| 15 | "Native Son" | Jerrold Freedman | Richard Wesley, from the novel by Richard Wright | June 29, 1988 |
| 16 | "The Big Knife" | John Jacobs | Clifford Odets | July 27, 1988 |

=== Season 8 (1989) ===
| No. in season | Title | Directed by | Written by | Original release date |
|---|---|---|---|---|
| 1 | "A Raisin in the Sun" | Bill Duke | Lorraine Hansberry | February 1, 1989 |
| 2 | "Ask Me Again" | Deborah Reinisch | Richard Greenberg, based on the novel by Laurie Colwin | February 8, 1989 |
| 3 | "Stacking" | Martin Rosen | Victoria Jenkins | February 15, 1989 |
| 4 | "My American Cousin" | Sandy Wilson | Sandy Wilson | February 22, 1989 |
| 5 | "Love and Other Sorrows" | Steve Gomer | Dick Goldberg, based on Harold Brodkey's short story "First Love and Other Sorrows" | March 1, 1989 |
| 6 | "Stand and Deliver" | Ramón Menéndez | Ramón Menéndez, Tom Musca | March 15, 1989 |
| 7 | "The Silence at Bethany" | Joel Oliansky | Joyce Keener | March 22, 1989 |
| 8 | "The Beginning of the Firm" | Allan A. Goldstein | Jan Jaffe Kahn, based on the novel by Owen Johnson | April 5, 1989 |
| 9 | "Life Under Water" | Jay Holman | Richard Greenberg, based on his play | April 12, 1989 |
| 10 | "A Great Wall" | Peter Wang | Peter Wang & Shirley Sun | April 19, 1989 |
| 11 | "The Diaries of Adam and Eve" | William Woodman | David Birney, adapted from Extracts from Adam's Diary and Eve's Diary by Mark Twain | April 26, 1989 |
| 12 | "The Meeting" | Bill Duke | Jeff Stetson | May 3, 1989 |
| 13 | "A Walk in the Woods" | Kirk Browning | Lee Blessing | May 10, 1989 |
| 14 | "Big Time" | Jan Egleson | Keith Reddin | May 17, 1989 |
| 15 | "The Thin Blue Line" | Errol Morris | Errol Morris | May 24, 1989 |
| 16 | "Ollie Hopnoodle's Haven of Bliss" | Dick Bartlett | Jean Shepherd | May 31, 1989 |
| 17 | "Imagining America" | Ralph Bakshi, Mustapha Khan, Edward Lachman, Matt Mahurin | Ralph Bakshi (segment: "This Ain't Bebop") | June 7, 1989 |
| 18 | "Belizaire the Cajun" | Glen Pitre | Glen Pitre | June 14, 1989 |
| 19 | "Rachel River" | Sandy Smolan | Judith Guest, based on stories by Carol Bly | June 21, 1989 |
| 20 | "Thousand Pieces of Gold" | Nancy Kelly | Anne Makepeace, based on the novel by Ruthanne Lum McCunn | November 30, 1989 |

=== Season 9 (1990) ===
| No. in season | Title | Directed by | Written by | Original release date |
|---|---|---|---|---|
| 1 | "Sensibility and Sense" | David Hugh Jones | Richard Nelson | January 24, 1990 |
| 2 | "Women & Wallace" | Don Scardino | Jonathan Marc Sherman, based on his play | January 31, 1990 |
| 3 | "The Wizard of Loneliness" | Jenny Bowen | Nancy Larson, based on the novel by John Nichols | February 7, 1990 |
| 4 | "Zora Is My Name!" | Neema Barnette | Ruby Dee, based on her play and work by Zora Neale Hurston | February 14, 1990 |
| 5 | "In a Shallow Grave" | Kenneth Bowser | Kenneth Bowser, based on the novel by James Purdy | February 21, 1990 |
| 6 | "Andre's Mother" | Deborah Reinisch | Terrence McNally | March 7, 1990 |
| 7 | "The Wash" | Michael Toshiyuki Uno | Philip Kan Gotanda | March 21, 1990 |
| 8 | "Triple Play" | Richard Kletter ("Teach 109"), Bryan Gordon ("Ray's Male Heterosexual Dance Hall"), Johanna Demetrakas ("Homesick") | Richard Kletter, based on an idea by Isaac Asimov ("Teach 109"), Bryan Gordon ("Ray's Male Heterosexual Dance Hall"), Robert Gordon ("Homesick") | March 28, 1990 |
| 9 | "Break of Dawn" | Isaac Artenstein | Isaac Artenstein | April 11, 1990 |
| 10 | "Prisoners of Inertia" | Jeffrey Noyes Scher | Jeffrey Noyes Scher | April 25, 1990 |
| 11 | "Eat a Bowl of Tea" | Wayne Wang | Judith Rascoe, based on the novel by Louis Chu | May 2, 1990 |
| 12 | "All God's Dangers" | Michael Hadley | Michael Hadley & Jennifer Hadley | May 9, 1990 |
| 13 | "Sidewalk Stories" | Charles Lane | Charles Lane | May 16, 1990 |
| 14 | "Bloodhounds of Broadway" | Howard Brookner | Howard Brookner & Colman DeKay, based on stories by Damon Runyon | May 23, 1990 |
| 15 | "Where the Spirit Lives" | Bruce Pittman | Keith Ross Leckie | June 6, 1990 |
| 16 | "An Enemy of the People" | Jack O'Brien | Arthur Miller, based on the play by Henrik Ibsen | June 13, 1990 |
| 17 | "Separation" | Barry Davis | Tom Kempinski | June 27, 1990 |
| 18 | "Hyde in Hollywood" | Gerald Gutierrez | Peter Parnell | July 6, 1990 |

=== Season 10 (1991) ===
| No. in season | Title | Directed by | Written by | Original release date |
|---|---|---|---|---|
| 1 | "Into the Woods" | James Lapine | James Lapine, Stephen Sondheim | March 15, 1991 |
| 2 | "The Grapes of Wrath" | Kirk Browning & Frank Galati | Frank Galati | March 22, 1991 |
| 3 | "Three Hotels" | Jon Robin Baitz | Jon Robin Baitz | March 29, 1991 |
| 4 | "The Sunset Gang" | Anthony Drazan & Calvin Skaggs | Ronald Ribman, adapted from stories by Warren Adler | April 5, 1991 |
| 5 | "Signs of Life" | John David Coles | Mark Malone | April 26, 1991 |
| 6 | "The End of a Sentence" | David Jones | Richard Nelson | May 3, 1991 |
| 7 | "O Pioneers!" | Kirk Browning & Kevin Kuhlke | Darrah Cloud, adapted from the novel by Willa Cather | May 15, 1991 |
| 8 | "Triple Play II" | Jonathan Sanger ("Peacemaker"), Susan Rogers ("Astronomy"), Stephen Tolkin ("The Price of Life") | Jonathan Sanger ("Peacemaker"), Susan Rogers ("Astronomy"), Stephen Tolkin ("The Price of Life") | May 21, 1991 |
| 9 | "Hot Summer Winds" | Emiko Omori | Emiko Omori, adapted from stories by Hisaye Yamamoto | May 24, 1991 |
| 10 | "The Plot Against Harry" | Michael Roemer | Michael Roemer | May 31, 1991 |
| 11 | "Darrow" | John David Coles | William Schmidt & Stephen Stept | June 7, 1991 |
| 12 | "The Hollow Boy" | Noel Black | Jay Neugeboren, adapted from the short story by Hortense Calisher | June 14, 1991 |
| 13 | "Misplaced" | Louis Yansen | Louis Yansen & Thomas De Wolfe | June 28, 1991 |
| 14 | "A Marriage: Georgia O'Keeffe & Alfred Stieglitz" | Edwin Sherin | Julian Barry | July 26, 1991 |
| 15 | "Longtime Companion" | Norman René | Craig Lucas | September 29, 1991 |
| 16 | "Metropolitan" | Whit Stillman | Whit Stillman | December 4, 1991 |

=== Season 11 (1992–1993) ===
| No. in season | Title | Directed by | Written by | Original release date |
|---|---|---|---|---|
| 1 | "Surviving Desire" | Hal Hartley | Hal Hartley | January 22, 1992 |
| 2 | "The Feud" | Bill D'Elia | Bill D'Elia & Robert Uricola, based on the novel by Thomas Berger | February 26, 1992 |
| 3 | "Fool's Fire" | Julie Taymor | Julie Taymor, adapted from the short story by Edgar Allan Poe | March 25, 1992 |
| 4 | "Mrs. Cage" | Robert Allan Ackerman | Nancy Barr, based on her play | May 20, 1992 |
| 5 | "Daughters of the Dust" | Julie Dash | Julie Dash | July 22, 1992 |
| 6 | "Tales from Hollywood" | Carlos Avila | Carlos Avila & Edit Villareal | October 19, 1992 |
| 7 | "Strangers in Good Company" | Cynthia Scott | Gloria Demers, with Sally Bochner, Cynthia Scott, & David Wilson | November 11, 1992 |
| 8 | "84 Charlie Mopic" | Patrick Sheane Duncan | Patrick Sheane Duncan | November 18, 1992 |
| 9 | "Tru" | Kirk Browning & Jay Presson Allen | Jay Presson Allen | November 23, 1992 |
| 10 | "Thank You and Good Night" | Jan Oxenberg | Jan Oxenberg | November 30, 1992 |
| 11 | "Straight Out of Brooklyn" | Matty Rich | Matty Rich | January 20, 1993 |
| 12 | "Fires in the Mirror" | George C. Wolfe | Anna Deavere Smith | April 28, 1993 |
| 13 | "In the Wings: Angels in America on Broadway" | Tom Bywaters | Tom Bywaters | June 11, 1993 |
| 14 | "La Carpa" | Carlos Avila | Carlos Avila and Edit Villarreal | June 16, 1993 |
| 15 | "Porgy and Bess" | Trevor Nunn | George Gershwin & Ira Gershwin & DuBose Heyward & Dorothy Heyward | October 6, 1993 |
| 16 | "The Quarrel" | Eli Cohen | David Brandes, adapted from the play by Joseph Telushkin, based on a story by Chaim Grade | November 29, 1993 |
| 17 | "Hallelujah" | Charles Lane | Michael Genet | December 22, 1993 |

=== Season 12 (1994) ===
| No. in season | Title | Directed by | Written by | Original release date |
|---|---|---|---|---|
| 1 | "Tales of the City" | Alastair Reid | Richard Kramer, based on the novel by Armistead Maupin | January 10, 1994 |
| 2 | "Simple Men" | Hal Hartley | Hal Hartley | April 4, 1994 |
| 3 | "Brother's Keeper" | Joe Berlinger & Bruce Sinofsky | [documentary] | May 2, 1994 |
| 4 | "Long Shadows" | Sheldon Larry | Milan Stitt | August 26, 1994 |
| 5 | "Ethan Frome" | John Madden | Richard Nelson, based on the novel by Edith Wharton | November 16, 1994 |
| 6 | "Golden Gate" | John Madden | David Henry Hwang | November 30, 1994 |

=== Season 13 (1995–1996) ===
| No. in season | Title | Directed by | Written by | Original release date |
|---|---|---|---|---|
| 1 | "The Making of Angels and Insects" | Unknown | Unknown | January 2, 1995 |
| 2 | "Blown Sideways Through Life" | Christopher Ashley | Claudia Shear, based on her play | July 19, 1995 |
| 3 | "Drawn from Memory" | Paul Fierlinger | Paul Fierlinger | October 30, 1995 |
| 4 | "The Beans of Egypt, Maine" | Jennifer Warren | Bill Phillips, based on the novel by Carolyn Chute | August 11, 1996 |
| 5 | "Passion" | James Lapine | James Lapine, Stephen Sondheim | September 29, 1996 |

== Notable cast ==
- Tom Aldredge
- Anthony Andrews
- Alan Arkin
- Anne Bancroft
- Christine Baranski
- Claire Bloom
- Jacques Boudet
- Kenneth Branagh
- Kate Burton
- Christopher Collet
- Hume Cronyn
- Jane Curtin
- Jim Dale
- Jeff Daniels
- Jeffrey DeMunn
- Pedro De Pool
- Ruby Dee
- Matt Dillon
- Olympia Dukakis
- Megan Follows
- Frederic Forrest
- Elizabeth Franz
- Matt Frewer
- Boyd Gaines
- Lillian Gish
- Joanna Gleason
- Danny Glover
- Annie Golden
- Louis Gossett Jr.
- George Grizzard
- Julie Hagerty
- Ed Harris
- Rosemary Harris
- Edward Herrmann
- Ken Howard
- Helen Hunt
- Glenda Jackson
- James Earl Jones
- Raul Julia
- Terry Kinney
- Swoosie Kurtz
- Cloris Leachman
- John Malkovich
- Patrick McGoohan
- Butterfly McQueen
- Caroline McWilliams
- Rita Moreno
- Paul Newman
- Geraldine Page
- Sarah Jessica Parker
- Estelle Parsons
- Mandy Patinkin
- Jeff Perry
- Bernadette Peters
- Lenka Peterson
- Vanessa Redgrave
- Keanu Reeves
- Lee Remick
- Peter Riegert
- Jason Robards
- Esther Rolle
- Liliane Rovère
- Susan Sarandon
- Sylvia Sidney
- Jean Simmons
- Gary Sinise
- Anna Deavere Smith
- Lois Smith
- Elaine Stritch
- Jessica Tandy
- Richard Thomas
- Maria Tucci
- Anne Twomey
- Dick Van Dyke
- Chuck Wagner
- Christopher Walken
- Eli Wallach
- Robert Westenberg
- Lynn Whitfield
- Paul Winfield
- Alfre Woodard
- Chip Zien

== Accolades ==
Some of the productions won multiple Emmys: one for Robert Morse in Tru, Outstanding Children's Program for Displaced Person and technical achievements for The Meeting alongside many nominations.

Academy Award recognitions included El Norte's nomination for Best Original Screenplay, a Best Actress nod for Jane Alexander in Testament, a Best Live Action Short Film win for Ray's Male Heterosexual Dance Hall, a Best Actor nod for Edward James Olmos in Stand and Deliver, a Best Supporting Actor nod for Bruce Davison in Longtime Companion and a Best Original Screenplay nod for Metropolitan.

Golden Globe recognitions included three for Stand and Deliver (two for Olmos (Leading Actor) and Diamond Phillips (Supporting Actor) and one for Best Motion Picture – Drama).

American Playhouse also won a Peabody Award in 1990.

== Legacy ==
Episodes like Nothing but a Man, The Thin Blue Line, El Norte and Stand and Deliver were each inducted into the National Film Registry.

Overdrawn at the Memory Bank was featured as an episode of the cult science fiction/comedy series Mystery Science Theater 3000.
