= Rachel Hendrix (film) =

- Directed by: Victor Nuñez
- Written by: Victor Nuñez
- Produced by: Heidi Levitt; Stewart Lippe
- Starring: Lori Singer; Kim Sandwich
- Cinematography: William Tanner Sampson
- Edited by: Victor Nuñez
- Music by: Charles Engstrom
- Release dates: February 2023 (Santa Barbara); July 8, 2023 (American Cinematheque)
- Running time: 119 minutes
- Country: United States
- Language: English

Rachel Hendrix is a 2023 American drama film written and directed by Victor Nuñez and starring Lori Singer and Kim Sandwich.

== Plot ==
Rachel Hendrix, an author and college professor, is still grieving one year after her husband's death during the height of the COVID-19 pandemic. She meets Ann, a young writer, who inspires her to regain her sense of purpose.

== Cast ==
- Lori Singer as Rachel Hendrix
- Catherine Dent as Em Evans
- Kim Sandwich as Ann Evans
- Hugo Armstrong as Carl Hendrix
- Kersti Bryan as Susan Sparrow
- Philip Casnoff as Jerry Rorty
- Roxanne Hart as Diane Wilson

== Release ==
The film premiered at the 38th Santa Barbara International Film Festival. Rachel Hendrix will be included in the July 8–9, 2023 American Cinematheque retrospective of Nunez's work. In the film's program notes, Jim Hemphill described it as "an expansion of Nunez’s work, not a repetition", and as "a late career masterpiece with another stunning performance at its center."

== Reception ==
In his review for The Hollywood Reporter Stephen Farber praised Singer's performance and the film's casting and cinematography, though he felt that it was slightly too long.
