= The Days and Nights of Molly Dodd =

American comedy-drama television series

- Genre: Comedy drama
- Created by: Jay Tarses
- Starring: Blair Brown
- Theme music composer: Patrick Williams
- Country of origin: United States
- Original language: English
- No. of seasons: 5
- No. of episodes: 65

Production
- Executive producer: Bernie Brillstein
- Camera setup: Single-camera
- Running time: 23:30 (NBC episodes); 22:50 (Lifetime episodes)
- Production companies: You And Me Kid Productions; Warner Bros. Television

Original release
- Network: NBC
- Release: May 21, 1987 – June 29, 1988
- Network: Lifetime
- Release: April 17, 1989 – April 13, 1991

The Days and Nights of Molly Dodd is an American comedy-drama television series that aired on NBC from May 21, 1987, to June 29, 1988, and on Lifetime from April 17, 1989, to April 13, 1991. It was created by Jay Tarses and stars Blair Brown in the title role.

== Premise ==
The show depicts the life of Molly Bickford Dodd, a divorced woman in New York City with a lifestyle that could be described as both yuppie and bohemian. Molly seems to drift from job to job and relationship to relationship. Her ex-husband, a ne'er-do-well jazz musician, still cares for her. In fact, nearly every man (and the occasional woman) she meets adores her. Her warmth and emotional accessibility are the root cause of most of Molly's problems in life. The BBC's Radio Times characterized the show as "A comedy series from America starring Blair Brown – Intelligent, attractive and independent, Molly Dodd has the world at her feet - so why must it always trip her up?"

== Cast ==
- Blair Brown as Molly Dodd
- James Greene as Davey McQuinn, elevator operator/doorman
- Allyn Ann McLerie as Florence Bickford, Molly's mother
- William Converse-Roberts as Fred Dodd, Molly's ex-husband
- Richard Lawson as Det. Nathaniel Hawthorne, one of Molly's romantic interests
- David Strathairn as Moss Goodman, one of Molly's romantic interests

=== Additional cast ===
- Maureen Anderman as Nina, Molly's best friend
- Sandy Faison as Mamie Grolnick, Molly's younger sister
- Victor Garber as Dennis Widmer
- Richard Venture as Edgar Bickford, Molly's father
- George Gaynes, John Pankow, J. Smith-Cameron, and Lewis Black

== Episodes ==
NOTE: Production Codes were taken from the Library of Congress.

=== Season 1 (1987) ===
No. overall	No. in season	Title	Directed by	Written by	Original release date	Rating/share/rank (households)
1 (#01)	1	"Here's Why Cosmetics Should Come in Unbreakable Bottles"	Jay Tarses	Jay Tarses	May 21, 1987	16.6 / 28 / #14
Molly Dodd, a newly-divorced woman in her mid-30's, begins facing life's challenges.
2 (#02)	2	"Here's Why There Are Instances When Vegetables Aren't Necessarily Good for You"	Jay Tarses	Jay Tarses	May 28, 1987	16.6 / 27 / #10
Molly's boss’s jealousy over her boyfriend drives her to resign from her job.
3 (#07)	3	"Here's Why You Should Stay Out of Coffee Shops If You Don't Drink Coffee"	Jay Tarses	Bob Brush	June 4, 1987	16.4 / 28 / #9
Nick the Garbage Man invites Molly on a trip to the Bahamas.
4 (#10)	4	"Here's Why You Should Never Wear High Heels to the Bank"	Jay Tarses	Bob Brush	June 11, 1987	16.5 / 28 / #11
During a musical project, Molly can't get her ex-husband out of her mind.
5 (#11)	5	"Here's Why It's Not Good to Stare at People in Restaurants"	Jay Tarses	Allan Burns	June 18, 1987	15.1 / 27 / #13
Molly is shocked to find her father dining with a new woman.
6 (#05)	6	"Here's Why It's Tough to Sell Watermelons After Midnight"	Jay Tarses	Judith Kahan	June 25, 1987	15.0 / 27 / #9
Molly sees a psychologist after a break-up.
7 (#06)	7	"Here's Why a Torch Is Too Heavy to Carry in a Purse"	Arlene Sanford	Judith Kahan	July 2, 1987	14.4 / 27 / #12
Molly receives mixed reactions from her friends after seeing a psychologist.
8 (#09)	8	"Here's Why They Call the Little One a Jingle and the Big One the Blues"	Jay Tarses	Jeffrey Lane	July 9, 1987	11.9 / 22 / #23
Fred calls up Molly to sing on stage with him.
9 (#13)	9	"Here's Another Bedtime Story"	Jay Tarses	Bob Brush	July 16, 1987	14.0 / 25 / #15
Molly receives a job offer from Birmanyi, and questions if any romance is involved.
10 (#03)	10	"Here's Why It's Good to Have a Cake Burning in the Refrigerator"	Jay Tarses	Sheree Guitar	July 23, 1987	14.7 / 27 / #9
Molly celebrates her 35th birthday, Nina has a baby, and Robin is separated from her husband. Molly has a poem published in an obscure poetry journal.
11 (#04)	11	"Here's Why Henry David Thoreau Chose the Pond"	Arlene Sanford	Laurie Gelman	July 30, 1987	14.5 / 26 / #8
Molly's ex-boss withholds her backpay.
12 (#12)	12	"Here's Why You've Gotta Bake a Batch of Cookies Every Once in a While"	Jay Tarses	Daniel Finneran	August 6, 1987	15.3 / 28 / #7
Molly's poetry teacher makes a pass at her, causing her to lose interest in the subject.
13 (#08)	13	"Here's Why Good Guys Sometimes Wear Black"	Mark Cullingham	Wendy Kout	August 13, 1987	15.0 / 26 / #10
Molly gets a new piano student, who is a Hasidic Jew.

=== Season 2 (1988) ===
No. overall	No. in season	Title	Directed by	Written by	Original release date
14 (#14)	1	"Here's Why You Shouldn't Get Too Attached to Your Cat"	Jay Tarses	Jay Tarses	March 24, 1988
Molly meets a handsome police detective, and consoles a friend who was robbed.
15 (#16)	2	"Here Are a Few Variations on a Sexual Theme"	Jay Tarses	Bob Brush & Jay Tarses	March 31, 1988
Molly is informed by her psychiatrist that she no longer wants her as a patient, and the reason for it.
16 (#17)	3	"Here Comes That Cold Wind Off the River"	Jay Tarses	Bob Brush	April 7, 1988
Molly is informed of some bad news after attending the theater with her family.
17 (#18)	4	"Here's a Bunch of Photos from an Old Album"	Jay Tarses	Bob Brush	April 14, 1988
The death of Molly's father reunites her with her brother.
18 (#19)	5	"Here's a Side Effect of Serious Moonlight"	Steven Dubin	Bob Brush	April 21, 1988
A deadbeat, who claims to be a cousin of Molly, moves in with her.
19 (#20)	6	"Here's a Message from Your Local Bag Lady"	Arlene Sanford	James Stark	April 28, 1988
A bag lady shouts out obscenities at Molly.
20 (#21)	7	"Here's a Little Known Ingrid Bergman Incident"	Don Scardino	Norma Safford Vela	May 25, 1988
The will of Molly's father is read.
21 (#22)	8	"Here's Who Ordered the Pizza"	Steven Dubin	Eric Overmyer	June 1, 1988
Molly finally meets the mystery man in apartment 12-F.
22 (#23)	9	"Here's What Happened to That Earring You Lost"	Jay Tarses	Bob Brush	June 8, 1988
Molly's friend finds out who robbed her apartment.
23 (#24)	10	"Here's a Reason to Keep Your Goats in the Barn"	Jay Tarses	Jay Tarses	June 15, 1988
Fred catches Molly and Moss almost kissing each other, and Dennis calls up Molly from jail.
24 (#25)	11	"Here's Talkin' to Yourself"	Jay Tarses	Bob Brush	June 22, 1988
Fred urges Molly to come see him play at a jazz club.
25 (#15)	12	"Here's Another Cryptic Message from Upstate"	Jay Tarses	Jay Tarses	June 29, 1988
Molly's new boss forgets that he was the one who hired her.
26 (#26)	13	"Here's That Old Shadow on the Wall"	Jay Tarses	Bob Brush & Jay Tarses	April 17, 1989
Molly's bike is stolen, and she confronts Moss about their relationship. Note: This episode was originally scheduled to be shown on NBC on July 6, 1988, but the network had cancelled the series by then; it was later shown on Lifetime on the night of the Season 3 premiere.

=== Season 3 (1989) ===
No. overall	No. in season	Title	Directed by	Written by	Original release date
27 (#27)	1	"Here's a Cute Way to Wrap up the Holiday Season"	Jay Tarses	Jay Tarses	April 17, 1989
Molly quits her sales clerk position at Goodman's Bookstore, and goes on a blind date for New Year's Eve.
28 (#28)	2	"Here's Why You Order from the Spanish Side of the Menu"	Don Scardino	Eric Overmyer	April 29, 1989
Molly looks for a job in the city and is introduced to Arthur Feldman by her mother.
29 (#29)	3	"Here's the Groovy Piano Bar Episode"	Don Scardino	Eric Overmyer	May 6, 1989
Molly contemplates a job offer in the publishing business.
30 (#30)	4	"Here's a Little Night Music"	Steven Dubin	Daniel Stern	May 13, 1989
Molly finds herself saddled with two uninvited houseguests.
31 (#31)	5	"Here's Why You Should Lock Your Bathroom Door"	Steven Dubin	Craig Volk	May 20, 1989
Molly accepts a position at the publishing house.
32 (#32)	6	"Here's a Clever Yet Practical Gift Idea"	Steven Dubin	Elaine Arata	May 27, 1989
Molly begins a relationship with detective Nathaniel Hawthorne.
33 (#33)	7	"Here's Why You Should Always Make Your Bed in the Morning"	Steven Dubin	Richard Dresser	June 3, 1989
Nathaniel takes Molly home for dinner.
34 (#34)	8	"Here's a Rough Way to Learn a Foreign Language"	Jay Tarses	Albert Innaurato	June 10, 1989
Molly gets a visit from Moss Goodman, her old boss from the bookstore.
35 (#35)	9	"Here's Some Ducks All in a Row"	Steven Dubin	Elaine Arata	June 17, 1989
Molly and Davey try to help the police find Molly's assailant.
36 (#36)	10	"Here's a Major Organ Interlude"	Don Scardino	Jodi Rothe & Christine Vertosick	June 24, 1989
Jury duty forces Molly to miss the first days at her new job.
37 (#37)	11	"Here's a Shot in the Dark"	William Converse-Roberts	Christine Pittel	July 1, 1989
Molly's dead father visits her in a dream.
38 (#38)	12	"Here's an Unexpected Twist on the Old Biological Clock"	Don Scardino	Richard Dresser	July 8, 1989
Molly experiences a frequent case of nausea.
39 (#39)	13	"Here's a Leisurely Stroll Through the Park"	Jay Tarses	Eric Overmyer	July 15, 1989
Molly finally gives her mother and Arthur Feldman her blessing.

=== Season 4 (1990) ===
No. overall	No. in season	Title	Directed by	Written by	Original release date
40 (#40)	1	"Here's Why Pink Isn't Necessarily a Girl's Favorite Color"	Steve Dubin	Elaine Arata	April 6, 1990
Molly discovers she is pregnant.
41 (#41)	2	"Here Are Just a Few Things That Could Possibly Go Wrong"	Don Scardino	Richard Dresser	April 13, 1990
Molly wonders who the identity of her baby's father could be.
42 (#42)	3	"Here's Why You Can Never Have Too Much Petty Cash"	Steve Dubin	Sarah Paley	April 20, 1990
Molly can't seem to find the down payment on her condo.
43 (#43)	4	"Here's a Perilous Research Project"	Don Scardino	Albert Innaurato	April 27, 1990
While researching her new book, Molly spends a day at the courthouse with Nathaniel.
44 (#44)	5	"Here's Something I Forgot to Mention"	Steven Dubin	Richard Dresser	May 4, 1990
Moss displays pregnancy books at the store, and Molly tells Nathaniel about her pregnancy.
45 (#45)	6	"Here's Why Restaurants Have a Minimum"	Steven Dubin	Elaine Arata	May 18, 1990
Nathaniel suggests that he and Molly live together.
46 (#46)	7	"Here's Another Lost Weekend"	Steven Dubin	Elaine Arata & Richard Dresser	May 25, 1990
Molly spends the weekend with Nina and her baby at Nina's country farm.
47 (#47)	8	"Here Are a Couple of Games You've Probably Played"	Don Scardino	Elaine Arata	June 1, 1990
Molly gets to know her new neighbors over a game of "Twist of Fate."
48 (#48)	9	"Here's a Rare Photo Opportunity"	Don Scardino	David Suehsdorf	June 8, 1990
Molly sees her baby for the first time on a sonogram.
49 (#49)	10	"Here's an Expensive Item with No Returns, Refunds or Exchanges"	Don Scardino	Richard Dresser & Elaine Arata	June 15, 1990
Molly receives a surprising gift from Fred.
50 (#50)	11	"Here Are Some Things That Go Bump in the Night"	Jeff Lieberman	Richard Dresser	June 22, 1990
Molly settles on her apartment, and notices that something is bothering her boss.
51 (#51)	12	"Here's a Quick and Easy Recipe for Leftovers"	Don Scardino	Richard Dresser	June 29, 1990
Molly holds a hectic Thanksgiving dinner in her apartment.
52 (#52)	13	"Here's a Good Reason to Check Your Answering Machine on a Regular Basis"	Don Scardino	Elaine Arata	July 6, 1990
On the day after Thanksgiving, Molly finally learns the identity of her baby's father.

=== Season 5 (1991) ===
No. overall	No. in season	Title	Directed by	Written by	Original release date
53 (#53)	1	"Here's a Neat Way to Tie Up the Loose Ends"	Don Scardino	Richard Dresser	January 19, 1991
Molly confronts the father of her baby, and when he proposes marriage, she is caught off-guard and accepts.
54 (#54)	2	"Here's a New Way of Looking at Cappuccino"	Steven Dubin	Elaine Arata	January 26, 1991
Molly and Ron, her neighbor and Lamaze coach, discuss childbearing with another couple in a cappuccino cafe.
55 (#55)	3	"Here's When the Fat Lady Sings"	Steven Dubin	Richard Dresser & Elaine Arata	February 2, 1991
Molly and Florence go to the beauty salon to get ready for the opera, and Molly receives a wedding ring.
56 (#56)	4	"Here Are Some Overnight Lows"	Steven Dubin	Elaine Arata & Richard Dresser	February 9, 1991
Molly goes through an unexpected tragedy, and the idea of impending motherhood.
57 (#57)	5	"Here's a Pregnant Pause"	Don Scardino	Richard Dresser & Elaine Arata	February 16, 1991
Molly talks directly to the camera for the entire episode.
58 (#58)	6	"Here's a Good Excuse for Missing the Party"	Blair Brown	Richard Dresser & Elaine Arata	February 23, 1991
At Molly's baby shower, she is nowhere to be found, because she has gone into labor.
59 (#59)	7	"Here's One Way to Fill Every Waking Moment"	Don Scardino	James Ryan	March 2, 1991
As Molly deals with motherhood, her thoughts drift to a fantasy, including All My Children star Jean LeClerc as a mysterious Frenchman in a Parisian bistro.
60 (#60)	8	"Here's a High Dive Into a Shallow Pool"	Kenneth Frankel	Richard Dresser	March 9, 1991
Molly learns she has been "promoted" to a human resources position, the first assignment of which is to fire her friend Bernie.
61 (#61)	9	"Here's How to Break the Other Leg"	Don Scardino	Richard Dresser	March 16, 1991
Molly and Arthur join Fred and Florence for the opening night of the play Arthur is producing.
62 (#62)	10	"Here's How to Put an Egg in Your Shoe and Beat It"	Blair Brown	Carl Capotorto	March 23, 1991
Molly is caught in the middle of her feuding neighbors, Ron and Ramona.
63 (#63)	11	"Here's Why You Shouldn't Talk to Strangers in the Park"	Don Scardino	Cindy Lou Johnson	March 30, 1991
Florence and Arthur have some surprising news for Molly about their relationship.
64 (#64)	12	"Here's When Life Begins at"	Don Scardino	Cindy Lou Johnson	April 6, 1991
Molly celebrates her 40th birthday with her best friend Nina.
65 (#65)	13	"Here's a Little Touch of Harry in the Night"	Jay Tarses	Jay Tarses	April 13, 1991
Molly reminisces about the early days when she was singing with a guitarist named Harry in "The Fred Dodd Quintet".

== Production ==
The Days and Nights of Molly Dodd had story lines that often did not resolve in a single episode.

The show was filmed using a single camera.

Production took place in Hollywood for the first two seasons before moving to Kaufman Astoria Studios in New York in season 3.

Tarses wrote and directed many of its episodes (and made a number of cameo appearances).

Blair Brown was given special billing above the title in the opening credits on the Lifetime episodes.

== Reception and network change ==
NBC first aired the series as a summer replacement in 1987, running 13 episodes. Molly Dodd was critically acclaimed and a moderate ratings success (it was featured in the network's then-powerhouse Thursday night lineup), but was not featured in the network's fall schedule. It again was a mid-season replacement for NBC in spring 1988 with 12 episodes (a season-ending 13th episode was produced but not aired). NBC canceled Molly Dodd after the second season.

After its NBC cancelation, cable network Lifetime picked up the series, first re-airing the 26 episodes originally produced, and then commissioning three more 13-episode seasons for 1989, 1990, and 1991. When they were rerun on Lifetime, the original 26 episodes were time-sped (usually during both acts), and the opening titles trimmed. After production ceased, Lifetime continued to air Molly Dodd in reruns until 1993.

== Awards and nominations ==
The show earned Brown five Emmy Award nominations as Outstanding Lead Actress in a Comedy Series, one for each year of the show's run. Brown won a CableACE Award for Best Actress in a Dramatic Series in 1991, during the fifth and final season's airing. Tarses was also the recipient of multiple nominations.

== Music rights ==
Despite some demand for the show on DVD or streaming services, the original producers did not clear music rights for subsequent broadcast. Although Brown often sang as Molly, the cost to secure the rights to the music itself would be substantial. In an interview, Brown indicated "all the songs that I sang, they never got the rights. So [the show is] in a vault somewhere and will never see the light of day."
