= Strapless =

1989 film

- DVD cover
- Directed by: David Hare
- Written by: David Hare
- Produced by: Rick McCallum
- Starring: Bridget Fonda; Bruno Ganz; Blair Brown
- Cinematography: Andrew Dunn
- Distributed by: Miramax Films
- Release date: 14 May 1989 (Cannes Film Festival)
- Running time: 100 minutes
- Country: United Kingdom
- Language: English
- Box office: $764,794

Strapless is a 1989 film written and directed by David Hare. The film starred Blair Brown, Bruno Ganz and Bridget Fonda.

== Plot summary ==
An expatriate American doctor in London allows herself to lighten up when her freewheeling younger sister and a mysterious man enter her life. Her inhibitions released, the beautiful doctor learns that freedom has its own price.

== Cast ==
- Blair Brown – Dr. Lillian Hempel
- Bruno Ganz – Raymond Forbes
- Bridget Fonda – Amy Hempel
- Alan Howard – Mr. Cooper
- Michael Gough – Douglas Brodie
- Hugh Laurie – Colin
- Dana Gillespie – Julie Kovago
- Spencer Leigh – Hus
- Alexandra Pigg - Helen

== Release ==
After the film's May 1990 U.S. theatrical release, it was released on videocassette in the United States by RCA/Columbia and in Canada by Cineplex Odeon. In 2000, the film was released on DVD by Anchor Bay. The DVD has since been discontinued.

== Reception ==
On the review aggregator website Rotten Tomatoes, 36% of 11 critics' reviews are positive.
