= A Flash of Green =

1984 film by Víctor Núñez

- Directed by: Victor Nuñez
- Screenplay by: Victor Nuñez
- Based on: A Flash of Green by John D. MacDonald
- Produced by: Victor Nuñez
- Starring: Ed Harris; Blair Brown; Richard Jordan; George Coe; Joan Goodfellow
- Cinematography: Victor Nuñez
- Edited by: Michael Fruet
- Music by: Charles Engstrom
- Production companies: A Flash of Green, Ltd.
- Distributed by: Spectrafilm
- Release date: September 15, 1984 (Toronto Film Festival)
- Country: United States
- Language: English
- Budget: $1 million

A Flash of Green is a 1984 American drama film directed by Victor Nuñez. It was first shown at the Toronto Festival of Festivals and New York Film Festival in 1984, then aired on PBS as an episode of American Playhouse in 1986. It is based on a 1962 novel by John D. MacDonald.

== Plot ==
A Flash of Green tells the story of small-town corruption and two people brave enough to fight back. When a local reporter starts sympathizing with an eco-group opposing a new development, a local county commissioner attempts to quiet him with a bribe. Going along with it at first, the reporter soon develops a conscience when the commissioner uses a right-wing paramilitary group to keep the eco-group in line.

== Cast ==
- Ed Harris as Jimmy Wing
- Blair Brown as Kat Hobble
- Richard Jordan as Elmo Bliss
- George Coe as Brian Haas
- Joan Goodfellow as Mitchie
- Herbert A. Childs as Security Guard

== Production ==
The film is adapted from the novel A Flash of Green by John D. MacDonald. Director Victor Nuñez spent four years trying to get the film made relying entirely on independent financing which came from private investors, grants from the National Endowment for the Arts, the Rockefeller Foundation, and support form the Public Television Playhouse, Inc.

== Release ==
While initially intended as an episode of American Playhouse on PBS, the film was acquired for distribution by Spectrafilm for a theatrical release on June 21, 1985 prior to premiering on television in the Fall of that year.
