= As Bees In Honey Drown =

1997 play by Douglas Carter Beane

As Bees In Honey Drown is a satirical comedy play by Douglas Carter Beane.

== Productions ==
The play premiered Off-Broadway in a Drama Dept. production at the Greenwich House Theatre on June 19, 1997. The play had readings at the Drama Dept. and Portland Stage Company, Maine (in the 1995–96 season) and had a workshop at the Sundance Playwrights Festival.

The play transferred to the Off-Broadway Lucille Lortel Theatre on July 24, 1997, and closed on June 7, 1998, after 366 performances. Directed by Mark Brokaw, the cast featured J. Smith-Cameron (Alexa), Amy Ryan (Amber/Back-Up Singer/Secretary/Bethany/Ginny), T. Scott Cunningham (Ronald/Skunk/Mike), and Bo Foxworth (Evan Wyler). Beane won an Outer Critics Circle Award for his writing, and lead actress J. Smith-Cameron won an Obie Award for playing Alexa.

== Plot summary ==
Alexa Vere de Vere, a flashy con artist who captivates and takes advantage of the almost-famous, has a new target in mind: Evan Wyler, a young New York writer. Alexa meets with Evan, claiming to be a record producer and asking him if he will write a screenplay based on her glamorous life story; this will require him to follow her around and take notes. She promises him fame and fortune in return—the same things she has promised, but never given, to so many other hot young aspiring celebrities.

As Evan accompanies her, Alexa spends money in lavish and wasteful ways, eating and staying at the Royalton and buying new suits from Saks Fifth Avenue. At one point, Evan offers to pay for lunch, and she repays him with too much money. From then on, Evan uses his credit card to buy everything for Alexa; but while she promises to pay him back, she never does.

Evan is gay, but that does not stop Alexa from bringing passion and romance into the situation. On a ferry boat, a glimmer of romance begins and they end up sleeping together at the Royalton. Alexa then opens up about painful events in her life, giving Evan the last of the material he needs for the screenplay. They are scheduled to meet in LA to discuss the movie opportunities it involves when Evan Wyler is given notice that his credit card has been maxed out and Alexa has disappeared.

Evan plots revenge, with the help of other con victims. These include Morris Kaden, a record producer, Illya Mannon, a dancer, Ginny Cameron, an aspiring violinist, and Alexa's supposedly dead husband, Mike Stabinsky, who is actually alive and a painter living in New York. After they tell Evan who Alexa really is, they all plan to bombard Alexa at once to demand answers, using Ginny Cameron as a decoy to get her there. Unfortunately, Ginny gets nervous and blows the cover of the plan, so Alexa arrives at Evan's apartment to let him know the plan has been spoiled. She offers to bring him in on her schemes, but he refuses.

In the end, Alexa passes by a bookstore to see a cover using her common catchphrase, "As Bees in Honey Drown". She opens the cover to see Evan and the story of all the cons and schemes she has perpetrated in her life. The tricks she has played on the aspiring artists of New York are over because of the artistic writings of Evan Wyler.

== Characters ==
- Alexa Vere de Vere: Antagonist in the play, a con artist living in New York
- Evan Wyler: Author who gets tangled up in Alexa's web
- Mike Stabinsky: Alexa's old friend from before she became a con artist, knew her as Brenda Gelb
- Morris Kaden: An executive at Delta Records who was also scammed by Alexa
- Secretary: Secretary to Morris Kaden
- Ginny Cameron: A young violinist who is being photographed by the same photographer as Evan Wyler for a magazine article
- Carla: An apparent old friend of Alexa's we meet in a nightclub
- Skunk and Bandmates: A British rock band and victims of Alexa
- Muses: Representations of Alexa
- Ronald: Salesclerk at Saks 5th Ave
- Illya Mannon: A dancer and victim of Alexa
- Swen: A Swedish model and victim of Alexa
- Bethany Vance: An actress and victim of Alexa
- Photographer/Mr Morrelli: Takes photos for book labels or magazine articles
- Amber: Assistant to the photographer

== Casts ==
Role	Portland Stage	Greenwich House	Lucille Lortel
Role	1995/6	1997	1997
Alexa Vere de Vere	Kristine Nielsen	J. Smith-Cameron	J. Smith-Cameron
Evan Wyler	Bo Foxworth	Josh Hamilton	Bo Foxworth
Photographer, Swen, Royalton Clerk, Kaden	Jeff Hayenga	Mark Nelson	Mark Nelson
Ronald, Skunk, Mike	Kevin Geer	T. Scott Cunningham	T. Scott Cunningham
Amber, Backup Singer, Secretary, Bethany, Ginny, a Second Muse	Kim Daykin	Cynthia Nixon	Amy Ryan
Waiter, Backup Singer, Carla, Newsstand Woman, Denise, Illya, a Muse	Lisa Benevides	Sandra Daley	Sandra Daley

== Critical response ==
The Variety reviewer wrote: "Alexa Vere de Vere, the absolutely fabulous whirlwind who blows through the delightful, pointed comedy 'As Bees in Honey Drown,' is a creation worthy of Isherwood, Capote, Bankhead and Tennessee Williams. In fact, as written by Douglas Carter Beane and played by Off Broadway treasure J. Smith-Cameron, Alexa is a creation of those worldly icons.... A smart and very funny vivisection of the greed for fame, glamour and the good life (or at least a new life), “Bees” is yet another slam-dunk for Off Broadway's Drama Dept."
