= Follow the Stars Home =

2001 television film directed by Dick Lowry

- Genre: Drama; Romance
- Based on: Follow the Stars Home by Luanne Rice
- Written by: Sally Robinson
- Directed by: Dick Lowry
- Starring: Kimberly Williams; Campbell Scott; Eric Close; Alexa Vega
- Music by: Mark Adler
- Country of origin: United States
- Original language: English

Production
- Executive producer: Richard Welsh
- Producer: Gordon Wolf
- Cinematography: Steven Fierberg
- Editor: Tod Feuerman
- Running time: 103 minutes
- Production company: Hallmark Hall of Fame

Original release
- Network: CBS
- Release: May 6, 2001

Follow the Stars Home is a 2001 American made-for-television romantic drama film directed by Dick Lowry. The film is based upon Luanne Rice's 2000 novel of the same name and was produced for the Hallmark Hall of Fame.

== Plot ==
Brothers David and Mark McCune are both in love with Dianne Parker, their neighbor who has been living with her mother Hannah since the death of her father when she was 17 years old. Although David treats her better, Dianne falls in love with Mark. They soon marry and it does not take long before she finds out she is pregnant. But their happiness is short-lived when their doctor announces that the child will have severe genetic abnormalities. Not wanting a less-than-perfect child, Mark orders Dianne to have an abortion. Dianne refuses and Mark leaves her.

Six years later, Dianne is a single mom taking care of her disabled child, a daughter whom she named Julia, with the help of her mother. One day, she meets young Amy Williams, who is growing up in a dysfunctional family. Her father died and her alcoholic mother, Tess, gets involved with an abusive man, Buddy. Amy, trying to escape from her home life during summer, starts helping Dianne care for Julia. Amy soon develops a friendship with Julia, which delights Dianne.

One day, Buddy, frustrated by the noise he is making, throws Amy's puppy from a bridge into the water. Amy, determined to save her puppy, jumps after him. She is able to save him but needs to get admitted to the hospital. Child services are contacted and Buddy is arrested and goes to jail, and it is then decided that Amy is not allowed to live with her mother anymore. Faced with the prospect of never seeing her daughter again, Tess, who still loves Amy very much, agrees to enter rehab. In the meantime, Amy is taken in by Dianne.

Tragedy strikes again when she and Amy are hit by a drunk driver. Amy suffers a broken arm, but Dianne is wounded more severely. She is visited in the hospital by Mark, who wants a second chance. After questioning his motives for a while, she decides to forgive him. David meets Mark in a diner and leads Mark to believe that Julia doesn't have long to live. Mark then proposes to Dianne and she accepts. The two talk about their future but when the discussion shifts to Julia, Mark makes disparaging remarks about Julia's condition. Realizing that he still doesn't care about their daughter and is waiting for her to die, Dianne dumps Mark for good. In the end, she accepts a proposal from David. Tess also completes rehab, and she and Amy reconcile.

== Cast ==
- Kimberly Williams as Dianne Parker-McCune, the daughter of Hannah, the mother of Julia, and the ex-wife of Mark.
- Campbell Scott as David McCune, a doctor, and the brother of Mark who has a romantic interest in Dianne.
- Eric Close as Mark McCune, the ex-husband of Dianne, the father of Julia, and the brother of David.
- Alexa Vega as Amy Williams, the daughter of Tess.
- Blair Brown as Hannah Parker, the mother of Dianne, and the grandmother of Julia.
- Roxanne Hart as Tess, the mother of Amy.
- Tim Ransom as Buddy, the boyfriend (later ex-boyfriend) of Tess.
- Amanda and Caitlin Fein as Julia Parker-McCune, the daughter of Dianne and Mark, and granddaughter of Hannah, who has Spina Bifida and Rett Syndrome.
- Octavia Spencer as Hildy, a library worker.
- Patricia Belcher as Counselor
- Judith Drake as Admitting Nurse
- Suzy Nakamura as Martha
