= Roxanne Hart =

American actress (born 1952)

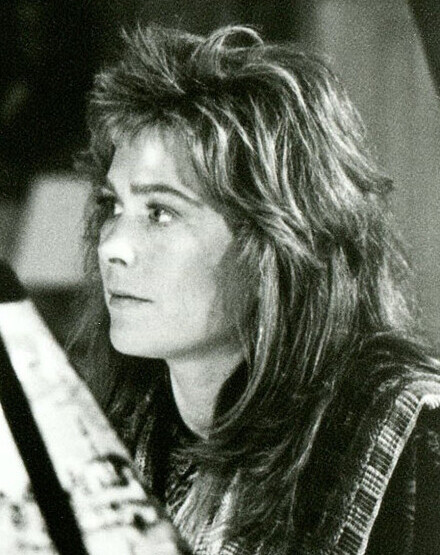
- Hart in 1986
- Born: July 27, 1952 (age 74); Trenton, New Jersey, U.S.
- Years active: 1979–present
- Spouse: Philip Casnoff
- Children: 2

Roxanne Hart (born July 27, 1952) is an American actress. She played Brenda Wyatt in the 1986 film Highlander, and Nurse Camille Shutt on the CBS medical drama series Chicago Hope (1994–1998). Hart received a Tony Award nomination for her stage work.

== Early life ==
Hart was born in Trenton, New Jersey, the daughter of Joan Irene (née McKee) and Edward J. Hart Jr. and the oldest of five children. Her father's work as a biology teacher who worked with NASA science projects took the family to Delaware, Colorado, Georgia, and Long Island as she grew up. She had no desire to act when she was young; she wanted to teach English at the college level. A course in Greek plays kindled her interest in acting when she was in college, and she decided to try that career. She attended Horace Greeley High School in Chappaqua, New York, and Webster College and graduated from Skidmore College.

== Career ==
Hart gained early acting experience with the Syracuse Stage company. She went on to debut in a production of Equus in New York, after which she performed in national tour of that play.

She appeared in several Broadway stage productions during 1980s, including the U.S. production of British playwright Peter Nichols' Passion, for which she received a Tony Award for Best Featured Actress in a Play nomination in 1983. She played supporting roles in films including The Verdict (1982) and Oh, God! You Devil (1984),"Guns at Cyrano's," Philip Marlowe, Private Investigator (1986), before landing a role opposite Christopher Lambert in Highlander in 1986. She has also played starring and supporting roles in Pulse (1988), Once Around (1991) and Moonlight Mile (2002). Hart also starred in a number of made for television movies.

From 1994 to 1998, Hart played Nurse Camille Shutt in the CBS medical drama series Chicago Hope. She had recurring roles on the 1990s HBO sitcom Dream On and NBC's Medium (2006–2010), and the HBO comedy Hung (2010–2011). She also guest starred on ER, Law & Order, Criminal Minds, Oz, Grey's Anatomy, The Closer, and CSI: Crime Scene Investigation. In 2016, Hart was cast in a recurring role on the second season of the ABC legal drama How to Get Away with Murder.

== Personal life ==
Hart married actor Philip Casnoff. They have two sons.

== Filmography ==
=== Film ===
Year	Title	Role	Notes
1979	The Bell Jar	Uncredited	
1982	The Verdict	Sally Doneghy	
1984	Old Enough	Carla	
1984	Oh, God! You Devil	Wendy Shelton	
1986	Highlander	Brenda J. Wyatt	starring role
1986	The Little Sister	Sara	
1988	Pulse	Ellen	starring role
1989	Big Time	Diane	
1991	Once Around	Gail Bella	
1998	Meteorites!	Cath Johnson	
2001	Beyond the City Limits	Danelle 'Dan' Perry	
2002	The Good Girl	Mrs. Worther	
2002	Home Room	Mrs. Cartwright	
2002	Moonlight Mile	June Mulcahey	
2003	Easy	Jackie	
2006	Art School Confidential	Mom Platz	
2006	Letters from Iwo Jima	Officer's Wife	
2007	License to Wed	Mrs. Jones	
2010	The Cross-Stitch	Sassy	Short film
2013	Sex & Marriage	Cat	Direct-to-video
2013	Salomé	Herodias	
2014	A Reason	Annabelle Hilgrim	
2015	Miracle Polish	Monica	Short film
2020	Deceased Ones		Short film
2023	Rachel Hendrix	Diane Wilson	

=== Television ===
Year	Title	Role	Notes
1980	One Life to Live	Isadora	Recurring role
1981	Kent State	Jean Arnold	Television film
1982	Tales of the Unexpected	Cara	Episode: "In the Bag"
1982	Remington Steele	Sheila Fervitz	Episode: "Steele Waters Run Deep"
1983	Special Bulletin	Megan 'Meg' Barclay	Television film
1986	Philip Marlowe, Private Eye	Jean Adrian	Episode: "Guns at Cyrano's"
1986	Samaritan: The Mitch Snyder Story	Carol Fennelly	Television film
1986	Vengeance: The Story of Tony Cim	Jan Cimo	Television film
1987	The Last Innocent Man	Jenny Stafford	Television film
1990	Against the Law	Lariane Piccaccio	Episodes: "The Second Man" and "Contempt"
1990	Law & Order	Janet Ralston	Episode: "Happily Ever After"
1991	Tagget	Annie Hartman	Television film
1991	Living a Lie	Grace	Television film
1992–1993	Dream On	Kate Gower	Recurring role, 5 episodes
1994	The Road Home	Dr. Buerring	Recurring role, 3 episodes
1996	Promised Land	Tracy Carter	Episode: "Little Girl Lost"
1997	When Secrets Kill	Karen Newhall	Television film
1997	Our Mother's Murder	Anne Scripps Douglas	Television film
1997	Alone	Grace Ann	Television film
1998	Meteorites!	Cath Johnson	Television film
1994–1996, 1998	Chicago Hope	Nurse Camille Shutt	Series regular, 46 episodes Nominated — Viewers for Quality Television Award for Best Supporting Actress in a Drama Series (1995); Nominated — Screen Actors Guild Award for Outstanding Performance by an Ensemble in a Drama Series (1995–1997)
1999	Party of Five	Joan	Episode: "Judgment Day"
1999	Walker, Texas Ranger	Caroline Whitman	Episode: "Mind Games"
1999	Come On, Get Happy: The Partridge Family Story	Betty Bonaduce	Television film
1999	ER	Mrs. Kottmeier	Episodes: "Humpty Dumpty" and "How the Finch Stole Christmas"
2000	The Runaway	Alice Davis	Television film
2001	Follow the Stars Home	Tess	Television film
2001	Law & Order	Judge Linda Karlin	Episode: "Judge Dread"
2002	The President's Man: A Line in the Sand	Lydia Mayfield	Television film
2002	The Agency	Elaine	Episode: "The Greater Good"
2003	Oz	Jessica Kirk	Recurring role, 3 episodes
2004	Strong Medicine	Cheryl	Episode: "Identity Crisis"
2004	Cold Case	Bobbi Olsen	Episode: "The House"
2005	House, M.D.	Margo Davis	Episode: "Poison"
2005	Numb3rs	Cris Carlyle	Episode: "Dirty Bomb"
2006	Murder 101	Betty Larch	Television film
2006	In from the Night	Ruth Miller Hammond	Television film
2006	Grey's Anatomy	Dana Seabury	Episode: "I Am a Tree"
2006	Day Break	Margaret Detweiler	Episode: "What If They Find Him?"
2006	Justice	Judge Madison	Episode: "Christmas Party"
2007	Bones	Cynthia Cole	Episode: "Stargazer in a Puddle"
2008	Grave Misconduct	Margo Lawrence	Television film
2008	Eli Stone	Emily Hayes	Episode: "Grace"
2008	Ghost Whisperer	Nancy Lucas	Episode: "Heart & Soul"
2009	Criminal Minds	Andrea Benton	Episode: "Demonology"
2009	The Closer	Doris Osgood	Episode: "Make Over"
2006–2010	Medium	Lily Devalos	Recurring role, 7 episodes
2011	Private Practice	Ellen	Episode: "Home Again"
2011	CSI: Crime Scene Investigation	Jean Tinsdale	Episode: "Father of the Bride"
2010–2011	Hung	Frances	Recurring role, 8 episodes
2012	The Mentalist	Shirley Bauer	Episode: "Cheap Burgundy"
2015	Merry Kissmas	Mrs. Joyner	Television film
2016–2017	How to Get Away with Murder	Sylvia Mahoney	Recurring role; 4 episodes
2017	Code Black	Judith Blackwell	Episode: "Vertigo"
2018	A Stolen Life (Deadly Lessons)	Barbara	Television film
2019	The Blacklist	Ava Ziegler	Episode: "Bastien Moreau"
2021	The Young and the Restless	Kim Dunaway	
2022	The Rookie	Maris Town	Episode: "Mother's Day"
