= Victor Nuñez =

American film director

- Born: 1945 (age 79–80); New York City, U.S.
- Occupations: Film director; screenwriter; editor; cinematographer; professor
- Years active: 1968–present

Victor Nuñez (born 1945) is a film director, professor at the Florida State University College of Motion Picture, Television and Recording Arts, and a founding member of the Independent Feature Project and Sundance Film Festival. He is best known for directing the critically acclaimed films A Flash of Green (1984), Ruby in Paradise (1993) and Ulee's Gold (1997). In 2008, Nunez was inducted into the Florida Artists Hall of Fame.

== Early life ==
Nunez was born in 1945 in New York City. Nunez and his family then moved to Peru, and then moving again to Haines City, Florida, with his mother after his parents' divorce. They moved again to Tallahassee, Florida, when Nunez reached the third grade. He received his undergraduate degree from Antioch College. He briefly attended the AFI Conservatory before transferring to UCLA Film School.

== Career ==
=== Short films ===
At Antioch College, Nunez made his first fictional shorts, "Fairground" (1968) and "Taking Care of Mother Baldwin" (1970). At UCLA Film School, where he received his MFA for his thesis film, "Charly Benson's Return to the Sea" (1972), going on to make another short, "A Circle in the Fire" (1974).

=== Feature films ===
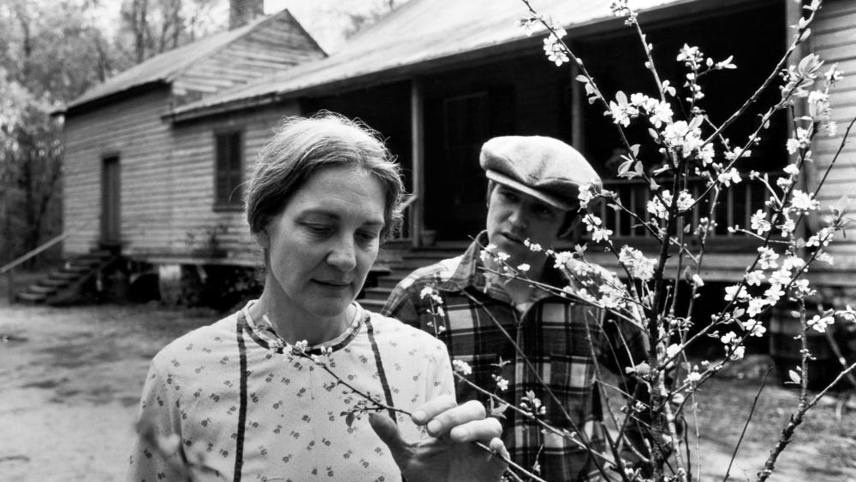
Dana Preu & David Peck in Victor Nuñez's Gal Young Un

Nunez made his feature debut with Gal Young Un, which premiered at the 1979 New York Film Festival. The film, based on the short story by Marjorie Kinnan Rawlings, centers on a spinster woman who lives alone in the woods of north Florida until she is swept off her feet by an opportunistic bootlegger, Trax. He marries her for her place and her daddy's money and her cooking and cleaning, which she freely shares. Inevitably, he shows his true colors in a variety of ways. One day Trax brings home a very young woman with clear intentions of keeping her as a mistress (a gal young 'un) in the older woman's house. Business takes him elsewhere and the two women are left alone in the woods together to come to terms with their shared exploitation by Trax.

Vincent Canby writing in the New York Times called Gal Young Un "An astonishingly good first feature."

The film was seminal in the early movement of American Independent Cinema, with Emanuel Levy stating, "Victor Nunez's first feature, Gal Young Un, which he wrote, directed, shot, and edited, helped to shape regional cinema within the larger independent movement. The period details are striking, particularly Nunez' camera work.

Following Gal Young Un, Nunez began working on an adaptation of John D. MacDonald's novel A Flash of Green.

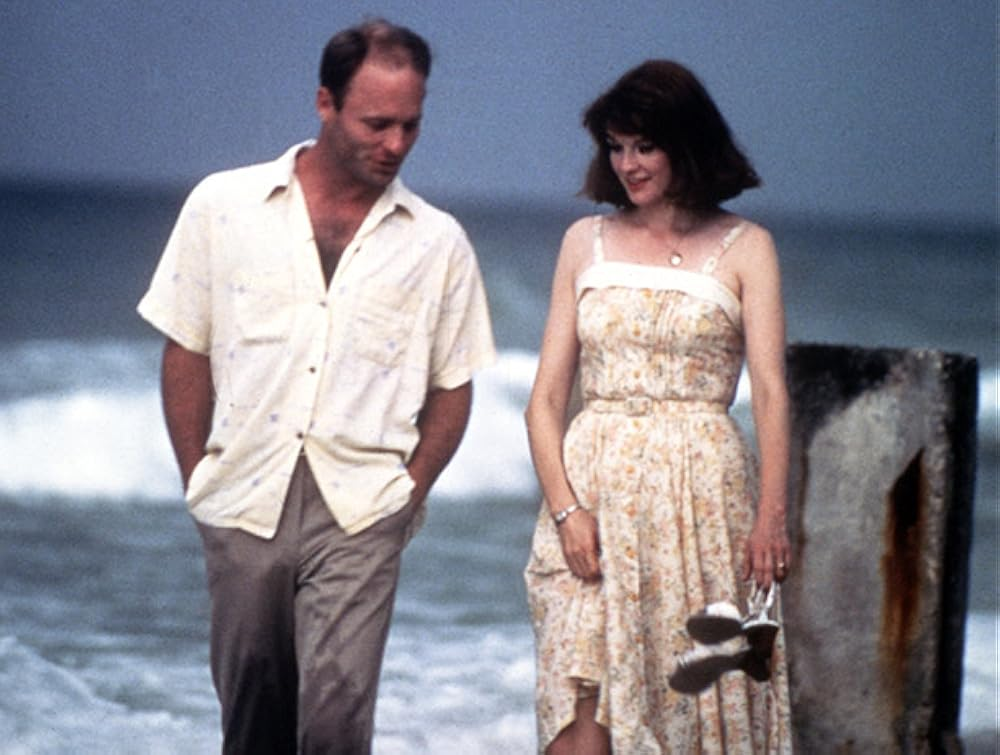
Ed Harris & Blair Brown in Victor Nuñez's A Flash of Green

The film, starring Ed Harris, premiered at the 1984 New York Film Festival. Its plot is about saving an unspoiled bay from greedy developers, and ending with a story about a man trying to save himself from his own greed.

Vincent Canby wrote:

Mr. Nunez does not make simple films. The film is the second feature to be written and directed by Mr. Nunez, the Florida filmmaker who delivered a bona fide green flash with Gal Young 'Un, his spare, beautiful adaptation of the Marjorie Kinnan Rawlings story. A Flash of Green is not perfect, but it is provocative and nearly always intelligent.

Nunez had to wait eight years before starting production on his next film Ruby in Paradise. He self-financed the film with 350,000 dollars left to him from an aunt.

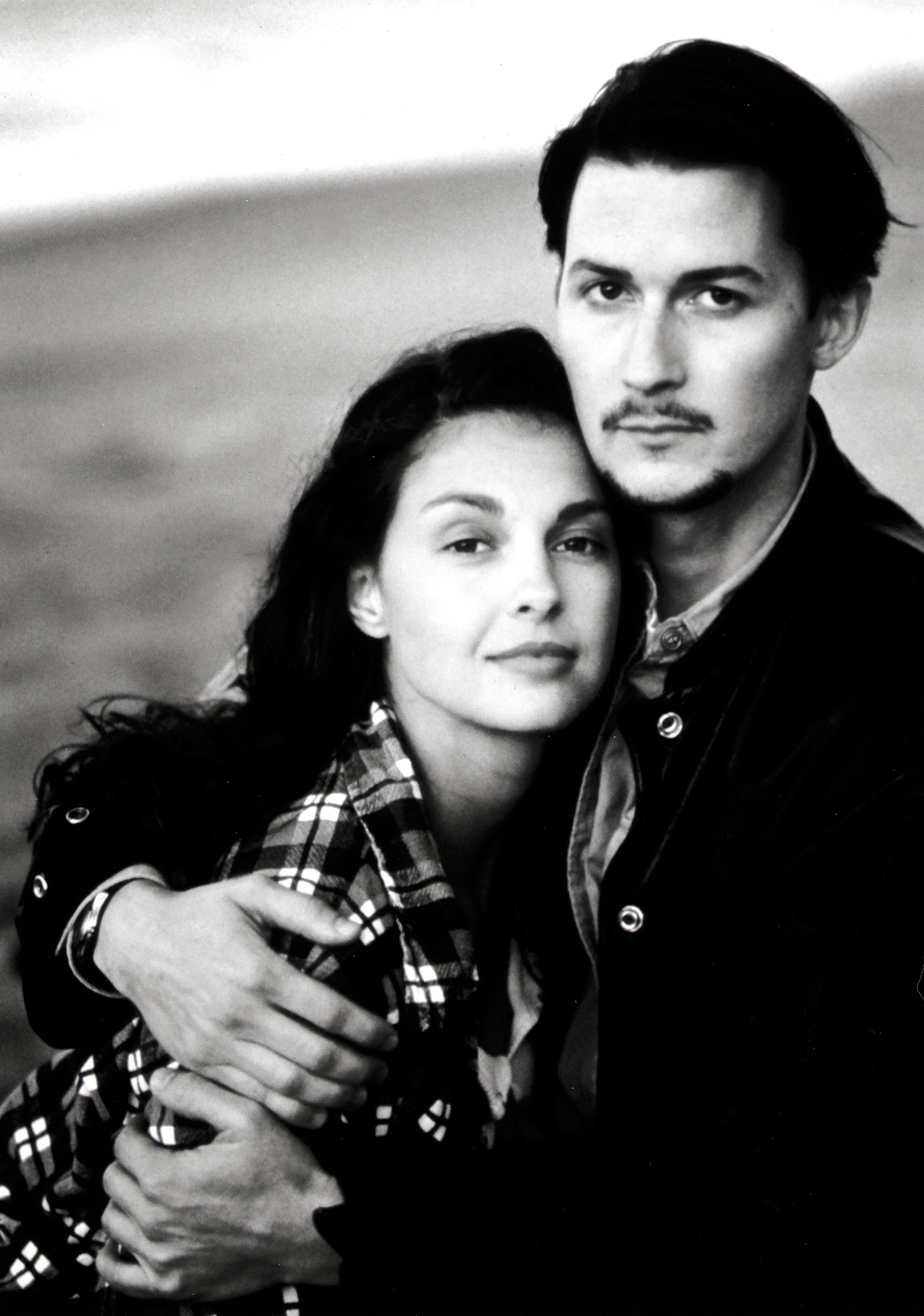
Ashley Judd & Todd Field in Victor Nuñez's Ruby in Paradise

The film starred Ashley Judd, in her first leading role, and also future Academy nominated filmmaker Todd Field. The film won the Grand Jury Prize at the 1993 Sundance Film Festival.

Roger Ebert wrote:

Ruby in Paradise is a breathtaking movie ... the writing, the acting, the lighting, the direction – you will be looking at a movie that knows exactly what it is about, and how to achieve it. Ruby in Paradise was written, directed and edited by Victor Nunez, a Floridian whose previous films, Gal Young Un and A Flash of Green, showed a deep sympathy with his characters. Nunez cares about his people – what they need and how they feel.

The success of Ruby allowed Nunez to make another film quickly, and this time with a major studio, and in 1997 he came out with the Academy Award nominated film Ulee's Gold starring Peter Fonda.

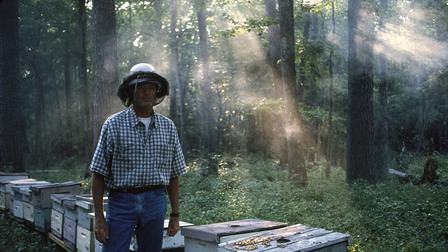
Peter Fonda in Victor Nuñez's Ulee's Gold

In Ulees Gold, Peter Fonda plays Ulee (short for Ulysses) Jackson, a Vietnam veteran, widower and grandfather. He is a beekeeper by profession, who raises two granddaughters, Jessica Biel and Vanessa Zima, because his son, Tom Wood, is in prison and his daughter-in-law Christine Dunford, a drug addict, has run away. Fonda was nominated for an Academy Award for Best Actor.

In 2016, Nunez was made a member of the Academy of Motion Picture Arts and Sciences.

Kenneth Turan of the Los Angeles Times said, "There is a quality about this film's use of deliberation that comes at times wonderfully close to magic."

In 2022 Nunez started production on Rachel Hendrix starring Lori Singer.

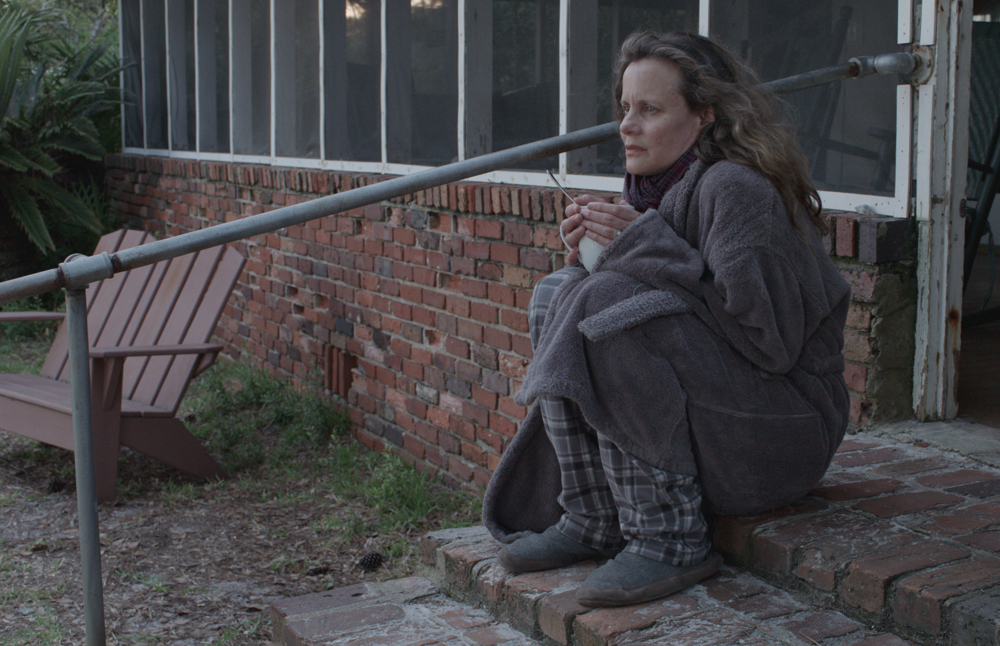
Lori Singer in Victor Nuñez's Rachel Hendrix

Rachel Hendrix premiered at the 2023 Santa Barbara Film Festival. In his Hollywood Reporter review Stephen Farber wrote:

As in several of his earlier films, Nuñez makes excellent use of the Florida locations. The seaside home and Rachel's in-town residence in Tallahassee both come alive as lived-in presences ... with a string of vivid performances by actors who are not household names but who all meet the demands of their roles. Of course, the movie depends primarily on the performance of Singer, who is onscreen almost constantly and conveys as much in silence as she does in her confrontations with her daughter. There is not a false note or wasted movement in this full-blooded portrayal.

== Directing techniques ==
Ahead of Nunez's 2023 American Cinematheque retrospective Jim Hemphill of IndieWire wrote:

"Victor Nunez may be the best director most people never heard of — but Stanley Kubrick and Ava DuVernay have." Hemphill goes on to talk about why not only directors, but actors like Josh Brolin and Todd Field admire Nunez as a filmmaker.

The fact that Nunez does prioritize character and performance is probably why so many actors have done some of their best work in his films; Ashley Judd in Ruby in Paradise, Peter Fonda in Ulee's Gold, and Ed Harris in A Flash of Green are just a few examples. Operating himself and often working in the super-16mm format with high-speed film stocks, Nunez creates an intimate style filled with visual texture that comes from the unusual properties of his grain and the way it interacts with light as well as his dedication to photographing parts of America not often seen on screen — and photographing them with the same love with which he approaches his characters.

== Sundance Film Festival ==
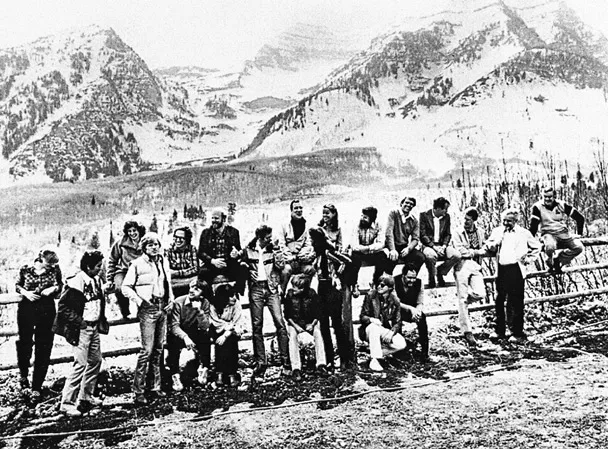
Founders meeting Sundance, 1980. Robert Redford fourth from left, Nuñez fifth from left

Nunez is one of the founding members of the Utah/US Film Festival which was renamed the Sundance Film Festival in 1991.

== Filmography ==
Year	Title
1968	Fairground
1970	Taking Care of Mother Baldwin
1972	Charly Benson's Return to the Sea
1974	A Circle in the Fire
1979	Gal Young Un
1984	A Flash of Green
1993	Ruby in Paradise
1997	Ulee's Gold
2002	Coastlines
2010	Spoken Word
2023	Rachel Hendrix
