= Blair Brown =

American actress (born 1946)

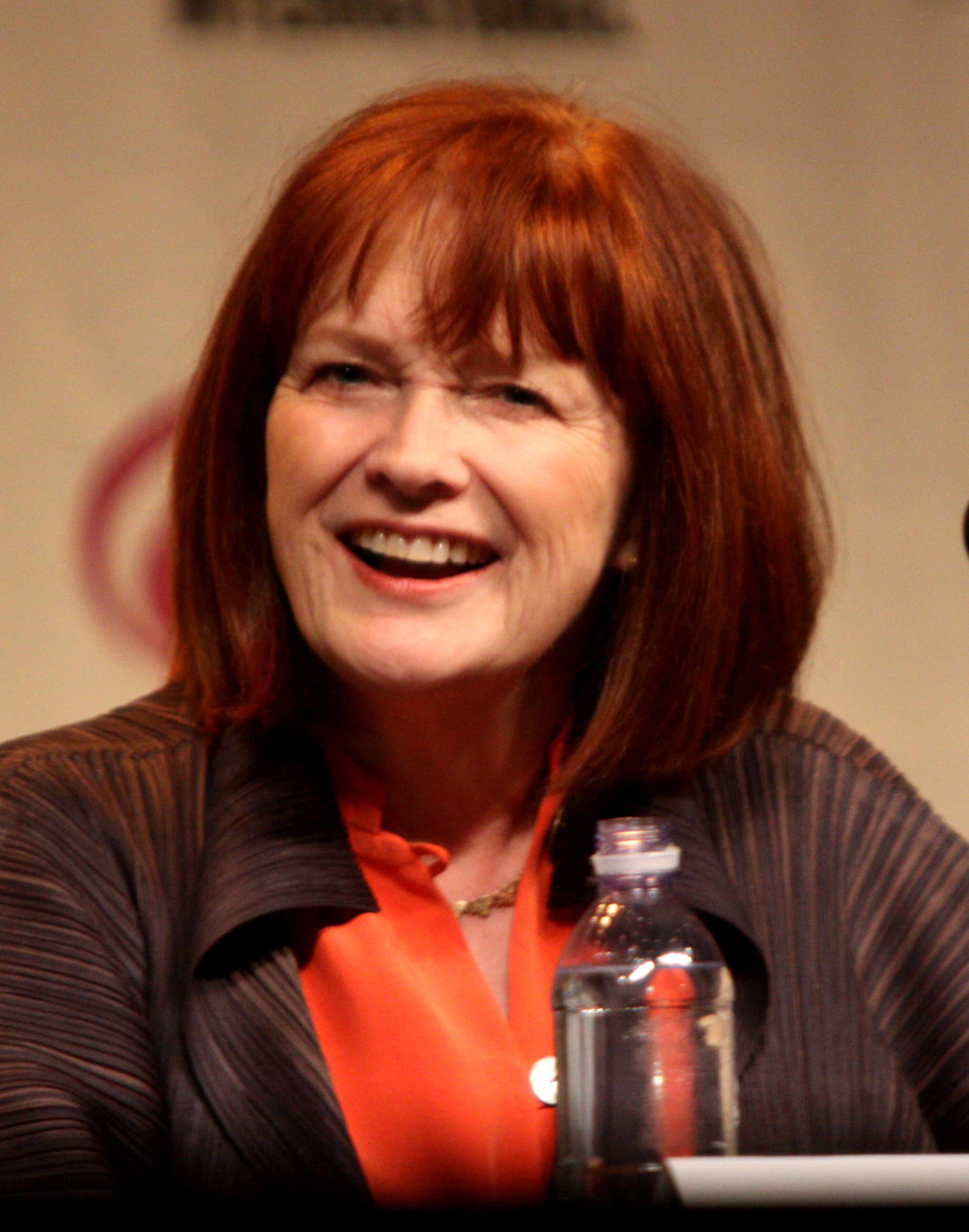
- Brown at Wondercon, March 2012
- Born: Bonnie Blair Brown; April 23, 1946 (age 80); Washington, D.C., U.S.
- Education: National Theatre School of Canada
- Occupation: Actress
- Years active: 1971–present
- Partner: Richard Jordan (1976–1985)
- Children: 1

Bonnie Blair Brown (born April 23, 1946) is an American theater, film and television actress. She has had a number of high-profile roles, including in the play Copenhagen on Broadway (for which she won a Tony Award in 2000), the leading actress in the films Altered States (1980), Continental Divide (1981) and Strapless (1989), as well as a run as the title character in the comedy-drama television series The Days and Nights of Molly Dodd, which ran from 1987 to 1991 and earned her four consecutive Outstanding Comedy Series Actress Emmy Award nominations. Her later roles include Nina Sharp on the Fox television series Fringe and Judy King on the Netflix series Orange Is the New Black.

== Early life and education ==
Brown was born in Washington, D.C. Her mother was a teacher and her father worked for the Central Intelligence Agency. She graduated from The Madeira School in McLean, Virginia, and then pursued acting at the National Theatre School of Canada, graduating in 1969. She gained notice as a participating actor at the Stratford Shakespeare Festival and spent several years working on the stage.

== Career ==
=== Film ===
Brown's first feature role was in the Oscar-winning 1973 film The Paper Chase. Her first major starring role was in The Choirboys in 1977. Among her other film credits are Altered States (opposite William Hurt), One Trick Pony (with Paul Simon), Stealing Home (opposite Mark Harmon), and A Flash of Green (1984). Her arguably highest profile film role to date was the romantic lead opposite John Belushi in Continental Divide (1981) for which she received her first Golden Globe Award nomination, in the category of Best Motion Picture Actress in a Comedy/Musical.

Other film roles include: And I Alone Survived (1978), Strapless (1989), The Astronaut's Wife (1999), Clint Eastwood's Space Cowboys (2000), Lars von Trier's Dogville, the Kevin Bacon-directed Loverboy (2005) and The Sentinel (2006).

=== Television ===
Brown appeared in several television movies and miniseries, primarily during the 1980s. A high-profile role as Jacqueline Kennedy in the 1983 TV miniseries Kennedy earned her a second Golden Globe nomination, for Best Actress in a Mini-Series or Motion Picture Made for Television, as well as a BAFTA nomination. She also appeared in several other programs about the Kennedys, including the 1996 miniseries A Season in Purgatory, which was a thinly veiled portrait of the family, as well as an appearance as Anna Roosevelt in a telefilm about Franklin Delano Roosevelt and Eleanor Roosevelt.

Brown's visibility rose during her five-year run (1987–1991) on the comedy-drama series The Days and Nights of Molly Dodd. She played the title role, and she, and the show, earned a small but dedicated following. Brown received five consecutive Emmy Award nominations for each season, in the category of Outstanding Lead Actress in a Comedy Series, but never won. The show spent two years on NBC, then moved to the Lifetime cable channel for the remainder of its run.

Brown also appeared in other prime-time series including The Rockford Files, Kojak, Frasier, Smallville, Touched by an Angel, ER, and Ed. In 1975 she appeared in one episode of the television mini-series Wheels and the following year she appeared in the TV pilot for The Oregon Trail. Beginning in 2008, Brown starred as Nina Sharp in the Fox television series Fringe. Brown also appeared in several seasons of the Netflix comedy-drama series Orange is the New Black as fictional television personality Judy King, an inmate loosely based on Martha Stewart.

=== Stage ===
Brown has been involved with theater since the beginning of her career. She appeared in the 1975 New York Shakespeare Festival production of The Comedy of Errors. Among her earlier roles was a run as Lucy Brown in the 1976 production of The Threepenny Opera, produced by Joe Papp and directed by Richard Foreman. She left the production for film work, but after being away from the production for eight months, Ellen Greene, who was playing the part of Jenny, fell ill. Brown astounded the stage manager of the production by coming in and, with one hour of rehearsal, put on a "brilliant" performance as Jenny. Her first major appearance on Broadway came in 1989, in the play Secret Rapture, written by David Hare.

Once "Molly Dodd" concluded, Brown became a prolific Broadway actress, appearing in, among other productions, Tom Stoppard's 1995 Lincoln Center Theater production of Arcadia and two separate runs as Frau Schneider in the revival of Cabaret (1998 and 2003). She played Margrethe, the wife of physicist Niels Bohr, in the play Copenhagen, a role for which she won a 2000 Tony Award in the category of Best Featured Actress in a Play. Brown played the lead role in Sarah Ruhl's 2006 play The Clean House at Lincoln Center.

=== Voice ===
In the 1990s, Brown expanded her career into voiceover work, narrating both audiobooks and films and documentaries. Her audiobooks projects include John Grisham's The Client, Lois Lowry's Number the Stars, Stephen King's Rose Madder, Kevin Henkes' Olive's Ocean, Sue Miller's 2005 novel Lost in the Forest, and Isabel Allende's Inés of My Soul.

Her voiceovers are heard on a number of documentaries, including PBS's American Experience series and the 2007 PBS series The Mysterious Human Heart. Other documentary narrations include the French-American documentary L'Empreinte des dinosaures (titled Tracking Africa's Dinosaurs in English, broadcast in 2001 by France 3 and in 2002 by the Discovery Channel), the scientific series The Secret Life of the Brain, a documentary on Aimee Semple McPherson, which aired in April 2007, and a 2006 PBS documentary about Marie Antoinette. In April, 2010, she co-narrated the PBS special The Buddha with Richard Gere.

== Personal life ==
Brown had a relationship with actor Richard Jordan, whom she met while filming the miniseries Captains and the Kings in 1976. The couple lived together from 1976 to 1985; their son Robert Hand Jordan was born in 1983. She dated playwright David Hare from 1985 to 1990; he referred to her as his muse.

== Acting credits ==
=== Films ===
Year	Title	Role	Notes
1972	House of Lovers	George Thacker	
1973	The Paper Chase	Miss Farranti	
1977	The Choirboys	Kimberly Lyles	
1980	One-Trick Pony	Marion Levin	
1980	Altered States	Emily Jessup	
1981	Continental Divide	Nell Porter	Nominated—Golden Globe Award for Best Actress – Motion Picture Musical or Comedy
1984	A Flash of Green	Kat Hubble	
1988	Stealing Home	Ginny Wyatt	
1989	Strapless	Dr. Lillian Hempel	
1991	The Good Policeman	Rebecca Karp	
1992	Passed Away	Amy Scanlan	
1999	The Astronaut's Wife	Shelly McLaren	
2000	Space Cowboys	Dr. Anne Caruthers	
2002	Grasp	Jean Malcheck	
2002	Benjamin Franklin	Jane Franklin Mecom	
2002	Young Dr. Freud	Narrator	
2003	Dogville	Mrs. Henson	
2005	Loverboy	Jeanette Rawley	
2006	The Sentinel	National Security Advisor	
2006	The Treatment	Miss Callucci	
2006	Griffin & Phoenix	Eve	
2007	Dark Matter	Hildy	
2007	First Born	Laura's Mother	
2011	The Speed of Thought	Bridger	

=== Television films ===
Year	Title	Role	Notes
1973	Dracula	Mina Harker	
1975	The School for Scandal	Lady Teazle	
1976	Captains and the Kings	Elizabeth Healey Hennessey	
1977	Eleanor and Franklin: The White House Years	Anna Roosevelt	
1977	Charlie Cobb: Nice Night for a Hanging	Charity	
1977	The 3,000 Mile Chase	Rachel Kane	
1977	The Quinns	Millicent Priestley	
1978	And I Alone Survived	Lauren Elder	
1979	The Child Stealer	Jan Rodman	
1983	The Skin of Our Teeth	Sabina	
1985	The Bad Seed	Christine Penmark	
1987	Hands of a Stranger	Diane Benton	
1990	Extreme Close-Up	Margaret Toll	
1991	Lethal Innocence	Sally Hatch	
1992	Those Secrets	Neille Banesh	
1992	Majority Rule	Gen. Katherine Taylor	
1993	Rio Shannon	Elizabeth Cleary	
1993	The Day My Parents Ran Away	Mrs. Judy Miller	
1994	Moment of Truth: To Walk Again	Carol Keating	
1994	The Gift of Love	Helen Porter	
1996	The Ultimate Lie	Joan 'Joanie' McGrath	
1996	A Season in Purgatory	Grace Bradley	
1997	Convictions	Zalinda Dorcheus	
2000	In His Life: The John Lennon Story	Mimi Smith	
2000	Hamlet	Gertrude	
2001	Follow the Stars Home	Hannah Parker	
2004	Dark Shadows	Elizabeth Collins Stoddard	Unaired TV pilot
2004	Copshop	Frances Harding	

=== Television series ===
Year	Title	Role	Notes
1971	Police Surgeon	Dulcy	Episode: "Lies"
1972–75	The Whiteoaks of Jalna	Pheasan Vaughan	2 episodes
1975	The Rockford Files	Kate Flanders	Episode: "The Girl in the Bay City Boys Club"
1976	Kojak	Stella	Episode: "Where Do You Go When You Have Nowhere to Go?"
1977	Family	Flora Jessup	Episode: "We Love You, Miss Jessup"
1978	Wheels	Barbara Lipton	Episode: "#1.1"
1983	Kennedy	Jacqueline Kennedy	Episode: "#1.2"; Nominated—BAFTA TV Award for Best Actress; Nominated—Golden Globe Award for Best Actress – Miniseries or Television Film
1985	Space	Penny Hardesty Pope	5 episodes
1985	ABC Afterschool Special	Joan Stewart	Episode: "Don't Touch"
1986	Comedy Factory	Valerie Arnold	Episode: "The Faculty"
1987–91	The Days and Nights of Molly Dodd	Molly Dodd	65 episodes Nominated—Primetime Emmy Award for Outstanding Lead Actress in a Comedy Series (1987–91)
1995	Frasier	Jill	Episode: "Shrink Rap"
1995	American Experience	Evelyn Nesbit	Episode: "Murder of the Century"
1997	Feds	Erica Stanton	Unsold TV pilot
2001	Touched by an Angel	Victoria	Episode: "A Winter Carol"
2002	Smallville	Rachel Dunleavy	Episode: "Lineage"
2002	CSI: Miami	Margie Winters	Episode: "Camp Fear"
2003	Law & Order	Virginia Masters	Episode: "Seer"
2003–04	Ed	Mary Burton	2 episodes
2003–07	American Experience	Narrator	5 episodes
2004	ER	Dr. Vicki Ford	Episode: "Midnight"
2004	Law & Order: Special Victims Unit	Attorney Lynne Riff	2 episodes
2005	Missing	Emma Roderick	Episode: "Off the Grid"
2008–13	Fringe	Nina Sharp	46 episodes Nominated—Saturn Award for Best Guest Starring Role on Television
2011	Falling Skies	Sonya	Episode: "What Hides Beneath"
2012	Political Animals	Mrs. Berg	Episode: "16 Hours"
2014	Forever	Fawn Mahoney Ames	Episode: "The Man in the Killer Suit"
2014	The Affair	Dr. Gunderson	Episode: "8"
2015	Person of Interest	Emma Blake	Episode: "Guilty"
2015–19	Orange Is the New Black	Judy King	26 episodes
2015–16	Limitless	Marie Finch	7 episodes
2017	Elementary	Kate Durning	2 episodes
2018	Jack Ryan	CIA Director Sue Joyce	2 episodes

=== Theater ===
==== As actor ====
Year	Title	Role(s)	Venue	Ref.
1970	Cymbeline	1st Brother	Stratford Festival Theatre, Ontario	
1975	Comedy of Errors	Luciana	Delacorte Theater, New York	
1976	Threepenny Opera	Polly Peachum, Lucy Brown, Jenny Towler	Vivian Beaumont Theater, Broadway	
1989	The Secret Rapture	Isobel Glass	Ethel Barrymore Theater, Broadway	
1995	Arcadia	Hannah Jarvis	Vivian Beaumont Theater, Broadway	
1998	Cabaret	Fraulein Schneider (replacement)	Kit Kat Klub, Broadway	
1999	Camino Real	Marguerite Gautier	Williamstown Theatre Festival, Massachusetts	
1999	James Joyce's The Dead	Gretta Conroy	Playwrights Horizons, Off-Broadway	
2000	James Joyce's The Dead	Gretta Conroy	Belasco Theatre, Broadway	
2000	Copenhagen	Margrethe Bohr	Royale Theatre, Broadway	
2002	A Little Night Music	Desiree Armfeldt	Eisenhower Theater, DC	
2003	Humble Boy	Flora Humble	City Center Stage I, Off-Broadway	
2003	Cabaret	Fraulein Schneider (replacement)	Studio 54, Broadway	
2006	The Clean House	Lane	Mitzi Newhouse Theater, Off-Broadway	
2013	Nikolai and the Others	Vera Stravinsky	Mitzi Newhouse Theater, Off-Broadway	
2016	Mary Page Marlowe	Mary Page Marlowe	Steppenwolf Theater, Chicago	
2017	On the Shore of the Wide World	Ellen	Atlantic Theater Company, Off-Broadway	
2017	The Parisian Woman	Jeanette	Hudson Theatre, Broadway	
2018	Mary Page Marlowe	Mary Page Marlowe	Second Stage Theater, Off-Broadway	
2021	Morning Sun	Claudette & others	City Center Stage I, Off-Broadway	
2022	The Minutes	Ms. Innes	Studio 54, Broadway	

==== As director ====
- Lovely Day, Beckett Theater (Off-Broadway), 2006
- A Feminine Ending, Playwrights Horizons (Off-Broadway), 2007
