= Gal Young Un =

Gal Young 'Un
- Directed by: Victor Nuñez
- Screenplay by: Victor Nuñez
- Based on: Gal Young 'Un by Marjorie Kinnan Rawlings
- Produced by: Victor Nuñez
- Starring: Dana Preu; David Peck; J. Smith; Gene Densmore
- Cinematography: Victor Nuñez
- Music by: Azalea Blossom String Band
- Release date: September 24, 1979
- Country: United States
- Language: English

Gal Young 'Un is a 1979 American drama film directed by Victor Nuñez.

== Plot ==
In the Prohibition era, the late 1920s, in the backwoods country of Florida, Mattie, an independent, middle-aged, pipe-smoking widow, lives alone. She has given up society, but is a woman of property.

A man named Trax appears, in need of money, and courts Mattie, who is old enough to be his mother. Mattie is charmed by his youth. When Mattie asks why he'd want to marry someone as old and tired as she is, Trax says, "Why not? There's not a thing wrong with you."

Trax marries Mattie and starts to spend her money on drink. He brings home a teenager to work as a housekeeper (the "gal young-un" of the title). She is young and giggly, and Mattie resents her; Trax obviously prefers the gal young-un and intends to move her into Mattie's home as his new partner. The girl appears very innocent, and Mattie is also angry at Trax for eagerly exploiting such a young woman, and realizes she has similarly been taken in by his charm.

The movie ends with Trax run off by Mattie holding a shotgun. She tells the girl to leave, go away and follow him, but Gal Young-Un replies: "He don't want me" and sits on Mattie's porch until she finally invites her in and gives her supper.

The ending of the movie has the two women sitting by the fire together, the young girl petting a cat, as Mattie says to the purring cat: "It's nice to have people around, isn't it?"

== Premiere and reception ==
The film was first shown at the 1979 New York Film Festival. It cost $94,000 to make the film with 30 percent of the financing coming from the National Endowment for the Arts, 25 percent from the Florida Fine Arts Council and the remaining from private investors and had a gross revenue of $500,000. The film was based on a 1932 short story by Marjorie Kinnan Rawlings and shot entirely in Florida. It won the Silver Hugo Award for Best First Feature from the Chicago International Film Festival, top prize from the USA Film and Video Festival and the O. Henry Award. The New Statesman called it a "gem of a film" while Emanuel Levy said it "helped shape regional cinema within the independent movement".
