= List of American independent films =

This is a list of notable American independent films (which are also known sometimes as "specialty", "alternative", "indie", and/or "quality") that were made outside of the Hollywood studio system or traditional arthouse/independent filmmaking yet managed to be produced, financed and distributed by the two with varying degrees of success and/or failure.

== Differences from Hollywood ==
The films are often made for far less money than Hollywood films (some films like Robert Townsend's 1987 satire Hollywood Shuffle, Richard Linklater's 1991 countercultural piece Slacker and Kevin Smith's 1994 Gen X comedy Clerks were funded by using credit cards) and each aspect of the filmmaking process has to undergo less scrutiny by committees. Additionally, within the Indiewood approach the filmmaker can take as long as they need in the post-production phase of their film - whereas in Hollywood they are contracted to finish the film in a specific period of time (usually 10 weeks). In Hollywood, the film then goes on to show in focus group screenings on the studio lot. In Indiewood, the filmmakers can determine the next steps of the film. They also bear striking similarities to as well as were influenced by the "proto-indies" of the 1960s such as Robert Downey Sr's still image film Chafed Elbows (1966), John Cassavetes's Academy Award-nominated Faces and Brian de Palma's Greetings (each from 1968) which in turn were influenced by the culture of the Beat Generation.

Many indie films were made by small companies that were created daily in the 80s and 90s to the point where most of them went bankrupt.

Most Indiewood films are first shown at film festivals with the hopes of further distribution by being picked up (or purchased) by a larger film company or distributor in order to find broader audiences alongside awards consideration (e.g. 2009's A Single Man).

== Background ==
The American independent film, beginning in the 1910s but prior to the 1980s and first half of the 1990s, was previously associated with race films, Poverty Row b movies (e.g. Republic Pictures), exploitation films, avant-garde underground cinema (when it was known as the New American Cinema), social and political documentaries, experimental animated shorts (since the mid-1930s featuring works by pioneer animators Mary Ellen Bute and Oskar Fischinger) and social realist dramas.

Many post-WWII period independent filmmakers, like Francis Thompson, believed that cinema is an art form and a forum for discussing social issues.

A notable scholar of indie cinema is Ray Carney, known for championing the works of Cassavetes and Mark Rappaport.

Throughout the mid-1990s, the word "Indiewood" (a.k.a. "indie boom" or "indie film movement") was invented to describe a component of the spectrum of American films in which distinctions exist, it seemed as if Hollywood and the independent sector had become blurred.

== Divisions ==
Indiewood divisions gain from expert experience of the niche industry by hiring leading independent personalities such as Harvey Weinstein from the Disney fold after the exit of the Weinsteins, and James Schamus, former joint head of Good Machine alongside producer Ted Hope, at Focus Features.

=== Other "mini-major" subdivisions/indie distributors ===
- Fox Searchlight Pictures
- Fine Line Features (established by New Line Cinema)
- Lionsgate
- NEON
- A24
- Netflix
- Summit Entertainment
- Samuel Goldwyn Films
- Warner Independent
- Picturehouse
- Orion Pictures
- Cannon Films
- Blumhouse
- Sony Pictures Classics
- IFC Films
- Shudder
- Magnolia Pictures
- Janus Films
- Kino Lorber
- Roadside Attractions
- Bleecker Street
- MUBI
- Amazon MGM Studios
- Paramount Vantage
- Oscilloscope
- American International Pictures
- Allied Artists

== List of notable American independent films ==
=== 1920s ===
- Within Our Gates (1920)
- By Right of Birth (1921; now a lost film)
- Safety Last (1923)
- Body and Soul (1925)
- The Gold Rush (1925)
- The Life and Death of 9413: a Hollywood Extra (1927)
- The Scar of Shame (1927)
- The Fall of the House of Usher (1928)
- Steamboat Bill, Jr. (1928)

=== 1930s ===
- Mamba (1930)
- Damaged Lives (1933)
- The Sin of Nora Moran (1933)
- The Vampire Bat (1933)
- Maniac (1934)
- The Plow That Broke the Plains (1936)
- Reefer Madness (1936)
- As the Earth Turns (1938)

=== 1940s ===
- The Blood of Jesus (1941)
- Native Land (1942)
- Meshes of the Afternoon (1943)
- Hell-Bent for Election (1944)
- Brotherhood of Man (1945)
- Detour (1945)
- Mom and Dad (1945)
- The Best Years of Our Lives (1946)
- Duel in the Sun (1946)
- Fireworks (1947)
- Motion Painting No. 1 (1947)
- Louisiana Story (1948)
- The Quiet One (1948)
- I Shot Jesse James (1949)

=== 1950s ===
- The Baron of Arizona (1950)
- Outrage (1950)
- Five (1951)
- The Steel Helmet (1951)
- Kansas City Confidential (1952)
- Othello (1952)
- Park Row (1952)
- Rancho Notorious (1952)
- Fear and Desire (1953)
- The Hitch-Hiker (1953)
- Invaders from Mars (1953)
- Little Fugitive (1953)
- Robot Monster (1953)
- Johnny Guitar (1954)
- Salt of the Earth (1954)
- Bride of the Monster (1955)
- Dementia (1955)
- Killer's Kiss (1955)
- The Man with the Golden Arm (1955)
- 3rd Ave. El (1955)
- Invasion of the Body Snatchers (1956)
- The Adventures of an * (1957)
- Attack of the Crab Monsters (1957)
- Forty Guns (1957)
- I Was a Teenage Werewolf (1957)
- A Man and His Dog Out for Air (1957)
- On the Bowery (1957)
- 12 Angry Men (1957)
- Attack of the 50 Foot Woman (1958)
- The Blob (1958)
- I Want to Live! (1958)
- Missile to the Moon (1958)
- The Screaming Skull (1958)
- Anatomy of a Murder (1959)
- Attack of the Giant Leeches (1959)
- A Bucket of Blood (1959)
- The Cry of Jazz (1959)
- Moonbird (1959)
- Plan 9 from Outer Space (1959)
- Science Friction (1959)
- Skyscraper (1959)
- Pull My Daisy (1959)
- Shadows (1959)
- The Violinist (1959)

=== 1960s ===
- The Fall of the House of Usher (1960)
- The Flower Thief (1960)
- The Little Shop of Horrors (1960)
- Munro (1960)
- Psycho (1960)
- The Savage Eye (1960)
- Allures (1961)
- The Beast of Yucca Flats (1961)
- Blast of Silence (1961)
- The Connection (1961)
- The Exiles (1961)
- Night Tide (1961)
- Something Wild (1961)
- The Brain That Wouldn't Die (1962)
- Carnival of Souls (1962)
- Eegah (1962)
- The Hole (1962)
- Wild Guitar (1962)
- Beach Party (1963)
- Blood Feast (1963)
- The Cool World (1963)
- The Incredibly Strange Creatures Who Stopped Living and Became Mixed-Up Zombies (1963)
- Mothlight (1963)
- Pianissimo (1963)
- The Sadist (1963)
- Shock Corridor (1963)
- The Brig (1964)
- Help! My Snowman's Burning Down (1964)
- Nothing But a Man (1964)
- Santa Claus Conquers the Martians (1964)
- Teenage Strangler (1964)
- Two Thousand Maniacs (1964)
- Time Piece (1965)
- Vinyl (1965)
- Chafed Elbows (1966)
- Chelsea Girls (1966)
- A Herb Alpert and the Tijuana Brass Double Feature (1966)
- Manos: The Hands of Fate (1966)
- The Wild Angels (1966)
- The Box (1967)
- David Holzman's Diary (1967)
- Dont Look Back (1967)
- The Graduate (1967)
- The Jungle (1967)
- Portrait of Jason (1967)
- Spider Baby (1967)
- The Trip (1967)
- Wavelength (1967)
- Who's That Knocking at My Door? (1967)
- Beyond the Law (1968)
- Faces (1968)
- Greetings (1968)
- Murder a la Mod (1968)
- Night of the Living Dead (1968)
- No More Excuses (1968)
- Symbiopsychotaxiplasm Take One (1968)
- Targets (1968)
- Why Man Creates (1968)
- Wild 90 (1968)
- Bambi Meets Godzilla (1969)
- Bob & Carol & Ted & Alice (1969)
- Easy Rider (1969)
- The Learning Tree (1969)
- Midnight Cowboy (1969)
- Putney Swope (1969)

=== 1970s ===
- The Further Adventures of Uncle Sam (1970)
- Husbands (1970)
- Is It Always Right to Be Right? (1970)
- Joe (1970)
- Maidstone (1970)
- Sweet Sweetback's Baadasssss Song (1970)
- Wanda (1970)
- Billy Jack (1971)
- Let's Scare Jessica to Death (1971)
- (nostalgia) (1971)
- Shinbone Alley (1971)
- THX-1138 (1971)
- Two-Lane Blacktop (1971)
- Fritz the Cat (1972)
- The Last House on the Left (1972)
- Pink Flamingos (1972)
- Badlands (1973)
- Coffy (1973)
- Frank Film (1973)
- Ganja & Hess (1973)
- Godmonster of Indian Flats (1973)
- Heavy Traffic (1973)
- Mean Streets (1973)
- Messiah of Evil (1973)
- Sisters (1973)
- Walking Tall (1973)
- Benji (1974)
- Closed Mondays (1974)
- Dark Star (1974)
- Female Trouble (1974)
- Fuji (1974)
- The Texas Chain Saw Massacre (1974)
- A Woman Under the Influence (1974)
- 200 (1975)
- A Boy and His Dog (1975)
- Aloha, Bobby and Rose (1975)
- Brother, Can You Spare a Dime? (1975)
- Cooley High (1975)
- Coney (1975)
- The Giant Spider Invasion (1975)
- Hester Street (1975)
- Kick Me (1975)
- Loose Ends (1975)
- Quasi at the Quackadero (1975)
- The Rocky Horror Picture Show (1975)
- Harlan County U.S.A. (1976)
- The Killing of a Chinese Bookie (1976)
- Massacre at Central High (1976)
- Rocky (1976)
- Alambrista! (1977)
- Eraserhead (1977)
- Furies (1977)
- The Hills Have Eyes (1977)
- Killer of Sheep (1977)
- Opening Night (1977)
- Annie Hall (1977)
- Dawn of the Dead (1978)
- Gates of Heaven (1978)
- Girlfriends (1978)
- Halloween (1978)
- Martin (1978)
- Northern Lights (1978)
- Piranha (1978)
- The Whole Shootin' Match (1978)
- Asparagus (1979)
- Bush Mama (1979)
- The Driller Killer (1979)
- Free Radicals (1979)
- Heartland (1979)
- Psychotronic Man (1979)
- The Wizard of Speed and Time (1979)

=== 1980s ===
- Atlantic City (1980)
- Friday the 13th (1980)
- The Life and Times of Rosie the Riveter (1980)
- Moon Breath Beat (1980)
- Personal Problems (1980)
- Out of the Blue (1980)
- Return of the Secaucus 7 (1980)
- Blow Out (1981)
- The Decline of Western Civilization (1981)
- The Evil Dead (1981)
- Fear No Evil (1981)
- Ms.45 (1981)
- My Dinner with Andre (1981)
- One from the Heart (1981)
- Polyester (1981)
- Stations of the Elevated (1981)
- Thief (1981)
- Will (1981)
- Zoot Suit (1981)
- The Atomic Cafe (1982)
- The Ballad of Gregorio Cortez (1982)
- Chan Is Missing (1982)
- Eating Raoul (1982)
- First Blood (1982)
- Forbidden Zone (1982)
- Illusions (1982)
- Liquid Sky (1982)
- Losing Ground (1982)
- The Loveless (1982)
- Say Amen Somebody (1982)
- The Secret of NIMH (1982)
- Smithereens (1982)
- White Dog (1982)
- Born in Flames (1983)
- El Norte (1983)
- Koyaanisqatsi (1983)
- Lianna (1983)
- My Brother's Wedding (1983)
- Seventeen (1983)
- Style Wars (1983)
- Suburbia (1983)
- Sundae in New York (1983)
- Variety (1983)
- Bless Their Little Hearts (1984)
- The Brother from Another Planet (1984)
- Choose Me (1984)
- Hair Piece: A Film for Nappyhead People (1984)
- In Heaven There Is No Beer? (1984)
- The Killing Floor (1984)
- Love Streams (1984)
- A Nightmare on Elm Street (1984)
- Paris, Texas (1984)
- Repo Man (1984)
- Stop Making Sense (1984)
- Stranger Than Paradise (1984)
- Streetwise (1984)
- The Terminator (1984)
- This Is Spinal Tap (1984)
- The Times of Harvey Milk (1984)
- Wildrose (1984)
- The World of Tomorrow (1984)
- The Adventures of Mark Twain (1985)
- Blood Simple (1985)
- The Breakfast Club (1985)
- Day of the Dead (1985)
- Desert Hearts (1985)
- Desperately Seeking Susan (1985)
- Kiss of the Spider Woman (1985)
- Mala Noche (1985)
- Re-Animator (1985)
- Runaway Train (1985)
- Smooth Talk (1985)
- Teen Wolf (1985)
- The Toxic Avenger (1985)
- Trip to Bountiful (1985)
- Blue Velvet (1986)
- Chopping Mall (1986)
- The Cosmic Eye (1986)
- Down By Law (1986)
- Hannah and Her Sisters (1986)
- Henry: Portrait of a Serial Killer (1986)
- Hoosiers (1986)
- Platoon (1986)
- Parting Glances (1986)
- Salvador (1986)
- She's Gotta Have It (1986)
- Sherman's March (1986)
- Something Wild (1986)
- Stand By Me (1986)
- Swimming to Cambodia (1986)
- True Stories (1986)
- Working Girls (1986)
- The Big Easy (1987)
- Border Radio (1987)
- The Brave Little Toaster (1987)
- Dirty Dancing (1987)
- Evil Dead II (1987)
- Hollywood Shuffle (1987)
- House of Games (1987)
- Matewan (1987)
- Miami Connection (1987)
- Near Dark (1987)
- Raising Arizona (1987)
- River's Edge (1987)
- Who Killed Vincent Chin? (1987)
- Your Face (1987)
- The Decline of Western Civilization Part II: The Metal Years (1988)
- Earth Girls Are Easy (1988)
- Eight Men Out (1988)
- Hairspray (1988)
- Heat and Sunlight (1988)
- Ko-Ko (1988)
- Lady in White (1988)
- Let's Get Lost (1988)
- The Moderns (1988)
- Patty Hearst (1988)
- Powaqqatsi (1988)
- Running on Empty (1988)
- Stand and Deliver (1988)
- The Thin Blue Line (1988)
- Tongues Untied (1988)
- Torch Song Trilogy (1988)
- All Dogs Go to Heaven (1989)
- Begotten (1989)
- Chameleon Street (1989)
- Common Threads: Stories from the Quilt (1989)
- Do the Right Thing (1989)
- Drugstore Cowboy (1989)
- Heathers (1989)
- Longtime Companion (1989)
- Mystery Train (1989)
- Powwow Highway (1989)
- Roger & Me (1989)
- sex, lies and videotape (1989)
- Sidewalk Stories (1989)
- True Love (1989)
- The Unbelievable Truth (1989)

=== 1990s ===
- All My Relations (1990)
- Frankenhooker (1990)
- The Grifters (1990)
- House Party (1990)
- Jacob's Ladder (1990)
- King of New York (1990)
- Metropolitan (1990)
- Miller's Crossing (1990)
- Mountains of the Moon (1990)
- Paris Is Burning (1990)
- Pump Up the Volume (1990)
- Sink or Swim (1990)
- Teenage Mutant Ninja Turtles (1990)
- To Sleep with Anger (1990)
- Total Recall (1990)
- Trust (1990)
- Wild at Heart (1990)
- Barton Fink (1991)
- Daughters of the Dust (1991)
- Dogfight (1991)
- Homicide (1991)
- L.A. Story (1991)
- Truth or Dare (1991)
- Mississippi Masala (1991)
- My Own Private Idaho (1991)
- Night on Earth (1991)
- Poison (1991)
- Queen of Diamonds (1991)
- Rambling Rose (1991)
- The Rapture (1991)
- Slacker (1991)
- Straight Out of Brooklyn (1991)
- Terminator 2: Judgment Day (1991)
- Wax or the Discovery of Television Among the Bees (1991)
- American Me (1992)
- Army of Darkness (1992)
- Bad Lieutenant (1992)
- Basic Instinct (1992)
- Bob Roberts (1992)
- A Brief History of Time (1992)
- Ferngully: The Last Rainforest (1992)
- Gas Food Lodging (1992)
- Glengarry Glen Ross (1992)
- In the Soup (1992)
- The Living End (1992)
- Malcolm x (1992)
- One False Move (1992)
- Passion Fish (1992)
- The Player (1992)
- Reservoir Dogs (1992)
- Simple Men (1992)
- Swoon (1992)
- The Tune (1992)
- Twin Peaks: Fire Walk with Me (1992)
- Alma's Rainbow (1993)
- Dazed and Confused (1993)
- El Mariachi (1993)
- Menace II Society (1993)
- Mi Vida Loca (1993)
- Red Rock West (1993)
- Ruby in Paradise (1993)
- Short Cuts (1993)
- Suture (1993)
- The Wedding Banquet (1993)
- Clean, Shaven (1994)
- Clerks (1994)
- The Dirty Birdy (1994)
- Dumb and Dumber (1994)
- Fresh (1994)
- Fresh Kill (1994)
- Go Fish (1994)
- Hoop Dreams (1994)
- The Hudsucker Proxy (1994)
- I Like It Like That (1994)
- The Last Seduction (1994)
- Little Odessa (1994)
- Mrs. Parker and the Vicious Circle (1994)
- Pulp Fiction (1994)
- The Red Book (1994)
- Reality Bites (1994)
- River of Grass (1994)
- Serial Mom (1994)
- Spanking the Monkey (1994)
- What Happened Was... (1994)
- Altair (1995)
- Before Sunrise (1995)
- The Brothers McMullen (1995)
- The Chicken from Outer Space (1995)
- Closer to Home (1995)
- Crumb (1995)
- Dead Man (1995)
- Dead Man Walking (1995)
- The Doom Generation (1995)
- Friday (1995)
- Kicking and Screaming (1995)
- Kids (1995)
- Leaving Las Vegas (1995)
- Living in Oblivion (1995)
- Safe (1995)
- Se7en (1995)
- Smoke (1995)
- The Usual Suspects (1995)
- Basquiat (1996)
- Big Night (1996)
- Bottle Rocket (1996)
- Box of Moonlight (1996)
- Citizen Ruth (1996)
- The Daytrippers (1996)
- The English Patient (1996)
- Fargo (1996)
- Flirting with Disaster (1996)
- Hard Eight (1996)
- I Shot Andy Warhol (1996)
- Lone Star (1996)
- Mystery Science Theater 3000: The Movie (1996)
- Schizopolis (1996)
- Sling Blade (1996)
- The Spitfire Grill (1996)
- Swingers (1996)
- Trees Lounge (1996)
- Waiting for Guffman (1996)
- Walking and Talking (1996)
- The Watermelon Woman (1996)
- Welcome to the Dollhouse (1996)
- When We Were Kings (1996)
- The Apostle (1997)
- Boogie Nights (1997)
- Chasing Amy (1997)
- Cop Land (1997)
- Eve's Bayou (1997)
- Good Will Hunting (1997)
- Grosse Pointe Blank (1997)
- Gummo (1997)
- Henry Fool (1997)
- The Ice Storm (1997)
- In the Company of Men (1997)
- Jackie Brown (1997)
- Lost Highway (1997)
- Love Jones (1997)
- Ulee's Gold (1997)
- American History X (1998)
- The Big Lebowski (1998)
- Buffalo 66 (1998)
- Drylongso (1998)
- Gods and Monsters (1998)
- Happiness (1998)
- High Art (1998)
- More (1998)
- New Rose Hotel (1998)
- The Opposite of Sex (1998)
- Next Stop Wonderland (1998)
- Pi (1998)
- Rushmore (1998)
- Shakespeare in Love (1998)
- Slam (1998)
- Smoke Signals (1998)
- The Spanish Prisoner (1998)
- Velvet Goldmine (1998)
- American Beauty (1999)
- American Movie (1999)
- Being John Malkovich (1999)
- The Blair Witch Project (1999)
- The Boondock Saints (1999)
- Boys Don't Cry (1999)
- Buena Vista Social Club (1999)
- Compensation (1999)
- Cruel Intentions (1999)
- Dogma (1999)
- Election (1999)
- Fight Club (1999)
- Guinevere (1999)
- Ghost Dog: The Way of the Samurai (1999)
- Happy, Texas (1999)
- Julien Donkey-Boy (1999)
- Magnolia (1999)
- The Sixth Sense (1999)
- Star Wars: The Phantom Menace (1999)
- The Straight Story (1999)
- The Talented Mr. Ripley (1999)
- Three Kings (1999)
- Treasure Island (1999)
- The Virgin Suicides (1999)

=== 2000s ===
- American Psycho (2000)
- Best in Show (2000)
- Chuck & Buck (2000)
- Finding Forrester (2000)
- George Washington (2000)
- Girlfight (2000)
- Memento (2000)
- Nurse Betty (2000)
- O Brother, Where Art Thou? (2000)
- Pitch Black (2000)
- Rejected (2000)
- Requiem for a Dream (2000)
- State and Main (2000)
- Traffic (2000)
- The Yards (2000)
- You Can Count on Me (2000)
- Donnie Darko (2001)
- Ghost World (2001)
- Hedwig and the Angry Inch (2001)
- In the Bedroom (2001)
- Jay and Silent Bob Strike Back (2001)
- The Lord of the Rings: The Fellowship of the Ring (2001)
- The Man Who Wasn't There (2001)
- Monster's Ball (2001)
- Mulholland Drive (2001)
- The Royal Tenenbaums (2001)
- Waking Life (2001)
- Y Tu Mama Tambien (2001)
- 25th Hour (2002)
- Adaptation (2002)
- Antwone Fisher (2002)
- Bend It Like Beckham (2002)
- Bowling for Columbine (2002)
- Bubba Ho-Tep (2002)
- Chicago (2002)
- Far from Heaven (2002)
- Funny Ha Ha (2002)
- Gangs of New York (2002)
- Gerry (2002)
- Igby Goes Down (2002)
- Laurel Canyon (2002)
- My Big Fat Greek Wedding (2002)
- Naqoyqatsi (2002)
- Personal Velocity (2002)
- Punch-Drunk Love (2002)
- Real Women Have Curves (2002)
- Roger Dodger (2002)
- Secretary (2002)
- Solaris (2002)
- Spellbound (2002)
- 25th Hour (2002)
- American Splendor (2003)
- Capturing the Friedmans (2003)
- Coffee and Cigarettes (2003)
- Cold Mountain (2003)
- The Cooler (2003)
- Elephant (2003)
- The Fog of War (2003)
- Girl with a Pearl Earring (2003)
- In America (2003)
- Kill Bill Volume 1 (2003)
- Lost in Translation (2003)
- Monster (2003)
- Open Water (2003)
- Pieces of April (2003)
- The Room (2003)
- Shattered Glass (2003)
- The Station Agent (2003)
- Taranation (2003)
- Thirteen (2003)
- 21 Grams (2003)
- The Aviator (2004)
- Baadasssss! (2004)
- Before Sunset (2004)
- Eternal Sunshine of the Spotless Mind (2004)
- Fahrenheit 9/11 (2004)
- Garden State (2004)
- Keane (2004)
- The Life Aquatic with Steve Zissou (2004)
- Maria Full of Grace (2004)
- Mean Creek (2004)
- The Motorcycle Diaries (2004)
- Napoleon Dynamite (2004)
- Palindromes (2004)
- The Passion of the Christ (2004)
- Primer (2004)
- Saw (2004)
- Sideways (2004)
- Silver City (2004)
- Super Size Me (2004)
- Take Out (2004)
- A Very Long Engagement (2004)
- We Don't Live Here Anymore (2004)
- The Aristocrats (2005)
- Brick (2005)
- Brokeback Mountain (2005)
- Capote (2005)
- Corpse Bride (2005)
- Crash (2005)
- Diary of a Mad Black Woman (2005)
- Good Night and Good Luck (2005)
- Hostel (2005)
- Hustle & Flow (2005)
- Man Push Cart (2005)
- Me and You and Everyone We Know (2005)
- Mutual Appreciation (2005)
- The Notorious Betty Page (2005)
- Pride & Prejudice (2005)
- The Puffy Chair (2005)
- The Squid and the Whale (2005)
- Syriana (2005)
- Babel (2006)
- Barnyard (2006)
- Blood Tea and Red String (2006)
- Bobby (2006)
- Facing the Giants (2006)
- For Your Consideration (2006)
- Friends with Money (2006)
- Half Nelson (2006)
- Hoodwinked! (2006)
- An Inconvenient Truth (2006)
- Iraq in Fragments (2006)
- Inland Empire (2006)
- Jonestown: The Life and Death of Peoples Temple (2006)
- Jesus Camp (2006)
- Little Children (2006)
- Little Miss Sunshine (2006)
- Marie Antoinette (2006)
- Nacho Libre (2006)
- The Namesake (2006)
- Old Joy (2006)
- The Painted Veil (2006)
- Pan's Labyrinth (2006)
- A Prairie Home Companion (2006)
- Quinceañera (2006)
- A Scanner Darkly (2006)
- Shortbus (2006)
- Southland Tales (2006)
- Thank You for Smoking (2006)
- The Darjeeling Limited (2007)
- The Diving Bell and the Butterfly (2007)
- I'm Not There (2007)
- In Bruges (2007)
- In the Valley of Elah (2007)
- Juno (2007)
- Margot at the Wedding (2007)
- A Mighty Heart (2007)
- No Country for Old Men (2007)
- No End in Sight (2007)
- Paranormal Activity (2007)
- The Savages (2007)
- Sicko (2007)
- Sunshine (2007)
- There Will Be Blood (2007)
- Waitress (2007)
- The Visitor (2007)
- American Teen (2008)
- Baghead (2008)
- Be Kind Rewind (2008)
- Fireproof (2008)
- Frozen River (2008)
- In Search of a Midnight Kiss (2008)
- Man on Wire (2008)
- Rachel Getting Married (2008)
- Sita Sings the Blues (2008)
- Synecdoche, New York (2008)
- Tyson (2008)
- Wendy and Lucy (2008)
- The Wrestler (2008)
- Adventureland (2009)
- Coraline (2009)
- The Cove (2009)
- Fantastic Mr. Fox (2009)
- 500 Days of Summer (2009)
- The Hurt Locker (2009)
- Inglourious Basterds (2009)
- Moon (2009)
- My Dog Tulip (2009)
- Precious (2009)
- Revolutionary Road (2009)
- A Serious Man (2009)
- A Single Man (2009)
- Sin Nombre (2009)
- Trash Humpers (2009)

=== 2010s ===
- Beginners (2010)
- Black Swan (2010)
- Blue Valentine (2010)
- Catfish (2010)
- Greenberg (2010)
- Inside Job (2010)
- The Kids Are All Right (2010)
- The King's Speech (2010)
- Meek's Cutoff (2010)
- Winter's Bone (2010)
- The Color Wheel (2011)
- The Descendants (2011)
- Drive (2011)
- Margaret (2011)
- Martha Marcy May Marlene (2011)
- Pariah (2011)
- Project Nim (2011)
- Take Shelter (2011)
- The Tree of Life (2011)
- Beasts of the Southern Wild (2012)
- Frances Ha (2012)
- Fresh Guacamole (2012)
- It's Such a Beautiful Day (2012)
- The Master (2012)
- Middle of Nowhere (2012)
- Paranorman (2012)
- The Place Beyond the Pines (2012)
- Spring Breakers (2012)
- Dallas Buyers Club (2013)
- Fruitvale Station (2013)
- Moonrise Kingdom (2013)
- Nebraska (2013)
- Only God Forgives (2013)
- 12 Years a Slave (2013)
- The Wolf of Wall Street (2013)
- Birdman (2014)
- The Boxtrolls (2014)
- Boyhood (2014)
- Ex Machina (2014)
- Foxcatcher (2014)
- Grand Budapest Hotel (2014)
- The Imitation Game (2014)
- Listen Up Philip (2014)
- OzLand (2014)
- Nightcrawler (2014)
- The Theory of Everything (2014)
- Whiplash (2014)
- Carol (2015)
- Dope (2015)
- It Follows (2015)
- Me and Earl and the Dying Girl (2015)
- Spotlight (2015)
- Tangerine (2015)
- The VVitch (2015)
- World of Tomorrow (2015)
- American Honey (2016)
- I Am Not Your Negro (2016)
- La La Land (2016)
- Life, Animated (2016)
- Manchester by the Sea (2016)
- Moonlight (2016)
- Swiss Army Man (2016)
- 20th Century Women (2016)
- The Atoning (2017)
- Call Me By Your Name (2017)
- The Disaster Artist (2017)
- First Reformed (2017)
- The Florida Project (2017)
- Get Out (2017)
- Good Time (2017)
- In a Heartbeat (2017)
- Ingrid Goes West (2017)
- I, Tonya (2017)
- Lady Bird (2017)
- Phantom Thread (2017)
- The Shape of Water (2017)
- Eighth Grade (2018)
- Hale County This Morning, This Evening (2018)
- Hereditary (2018)
- Isle of Dogs (2018)
- The Last Black Man in San Francisco (2018)
- Minding the Gap (2018)
- RBG (2018)
- The Rider (2018)
- Sorry to Bother You (2018)
- The Farewell (2019)
- First Cow (2019)
- Hair Love (2019)
- Jojo Rabbit (2019)
- The Lighthouse (2019)
- Marriage Story (2019)
- The Peanut Butter Falcon (2019)
- Uncut Gems (2019)

=== 2020s ===
- Cryptozoo (2020)
- The Forty-Year-Old Version (2020)
- Miss Juneteenth (2020)
- Minari (2020)
- Nomadland (2020)
- Ode to Passion (2020)
- Zola (2020)
- CODA (2021)
- Jockey (2021)
- The Lost Daughter (2021)
- Mad God (2021)
- Pig (2021)
- Shiva Baby (2021)
- Slapface (2021)
- Summer of Soul (2021)
- Everything Everywhere All At Once (2022)
- Fire of Love (2022)
- Hundreds of Beavers (2022)
- Marcel the Shell with Shoes On (2022)
- My Year of Dicks (2022)
- The People's Joker (2022)
- Tár (2022)
- The Whale (2022)
- American Fiction (2023)
- Going to Mars: The Nikki Giovanni Project (2023)
- The Holdovers (2023)
- Kokomo City (2023)
- Ninety-Five Senses (2023)
- Past Lives (2023)
- Poor Things (2023)
- Renaissance: A Film by Beyoncé (2023)
- Saltburn (2023)
- Sound of Freedom (2023)
- The Sweet East (2023)
- Taylor Swift: The Eras Tour (2023)
- A Thousand and One (2023)
- War Is Over! (2023)
- Anora (2024)
- The Apprentice (2024)
- Babes (2024)
- Between the Temples (2024)
- The Brutalist (2024)
- Civil War (2024)
- Dìdi (2024)
- A Different Man (2024)
- Gasoline Rainbow (2024)
- His Three Daughters (2024)
- I Saw the TV Glow (2024)
- The Last Showgirl (2024)
- Late Night with the Devil (2024)
- MaXXXine (2024)
- On Swift Horses (2024)
- Nickel Boys (2024)
- Pavements (2024)
- Priscilla (2024)
- Psycho Therapy: The Shallow Tale of a Writer Who Decided to Write About a Serial Killer (2024)
- A Real Pain (2024)
- The Substance (2024)
- Thelma (2024)
- The Baltimorons (2025)
- Boys Go to Jupiter (2025)
- Bubble & Squeak (2025)
- Dust Bunny (2025)
- By Design (2025)
- East of Wall (2025)
- Forevergreen (2025)
- Good Boy (2025)
- Hamnet (2025)
- Kiss of the Spider Woman (2025)
- Love, Brooklyn (2025)
- Magic Hour (2025)
- OBEX (2025)
- The Perfect Neighbor (2025)
- Peter Hujar's Day (2025)
- Rebuilding (2025)
- Rental Family (2025)
- Ricky (2025)
- Sorry, Baby (2025)
- Together (2025)
- The True Beauty of Being Bitten by a Tick (2025)
- Buddy (2026)
- The Drama (2026)
- Iron Lung (2026)
- Tangles (2026)

== List of notable directors of American independent cinema ==
- Ayoka Chenzira
- Julie Dash
- Cheryl Dunye
- Kathleen Collins
- Lizzie Borden
- Ava DuVernay
- Dee Rees
- Chloe Zhao
- Celine Song
- Lulu Wang
- Mira Nair
- Joseph Nobile
- Barry Jenkins
- Billy Woodberry
- Marlon Riggs
- Stanley Nelson
- Charles Burnett
- William Greaves
- Wendell B. Harris Jr.
- Oscar Micheaux
- Ryan Coogler
- Tyler Perry
- Spike Lee
- Reginald Hudlin
- RaMell Ross
- Robert Townsend
- Walter Salles
- Ramin Bahrani
- Alfonso Cuaron
- Denzel Washington
- Ang Lee
- Lee Daniels
- Daniels
- Wayne Wang
- Lee Isaac Chung
- Lisa Cholodenko
- Mario Van Peebles
- Melvin Van Peebles
- Robert Rodriguez
- Gregory Nava
- Robert M. Young
- Miguel Arteta
- Guillermo del Toro
- Chris Eyre
- Taika Waititi
- Nina Menkes
- Claudia Weill
- Donna Deitch
- Joyce Chopra
- Mary Harron
- Jennie Livingston
- Penelope Spheeris
- Martha Coolidge
- Kelly Reichardt
- Debra Granik
- Alice Wu
- Eliza Hittman
- Susan Seidelman
- Adrienne Shelly
- Ida Lupino
- Maggie Gyllenhaal
- Joan Micklin Silver
- Signe Baumane
- Ralph Bakshi
- Don Bluth
- Will Vinton
- Suzan Pitt
- Don Hertzfeldt
- Bill Plympton
- John and Faith Hubley
- George Griffin
- John R. Dilworth
- Mark Osborne
- Candy Kugel
- Janie Geiser
- Fred Mogubgub
- John Canemaker
- Paul Fierlinger
- Joanna Priestley
- PES
- Nina Paley
- Harry Everett Smith
- Jordan Belson
- Robert Breer
- Mary Ellen Bute
- Nicole Holofcener
- Tom McCarthy
- Alex Garland
- Patty Jenkins
- Sarah Polley
- Sian Heder
- Lena Dunham
- Greta Gerwig
- Miranda July
- Bette Gordon
- Nancy Savoca
- Todd Haynes
- John Waters
- Greg Araki
- Sean Baker
- Stanley Kubrick
- Lodge Kerrigan
- Alex Ross Perry
- Jeff Nichols
- Mike Nichols
- Henry Jaglom
- Jim McBride
- Jonas Mekas
- Andrew Bujalski
- John Cameron Mitchell
- Gus Van Sant
- Steve James
- Wim Wenders
- Jim McKay
- Bo Burnham
- Joel and Ethan Coen
- Mark and Jay Duplass
- Sam Raimi
- Josh and Benny Safdie
- Joe Swanberg
- Rian Johnson
- Christopher Guest
- Alan Rudolph
- James Gray
- Andrea Arnold
- Robert Eggers
- George A. Romero
- Wes Craven
- John Carpenter
- Yorgos Lanthimos
- Ari Aster
- Paul Schrader
- Mike Mills
- Joe Wright
- Jim Jarmusch
- Rob Nilsson
- Zach Braff
- George Clooney
- James Mangold
- Sam Mendes
- Spike Jonze
- Errol Morris
- Martin Scorsese
- Sam Fuller
- Edgar G. Ulmer
- John Cassavetes
- Brian de Palma
- Robert Downey Sr
- Norman Mailer
- Andy Warhol
- Curtis Harrington
- Kenneth Anger
- Herk Harvey
- Ron Rice
- Jon Jost
- Robert Frank
- Kent Mackenzie
- Bii and Turner Ross
- James Marsh
- Greg Mottola
- Jon Favreau
- Bennett Miller
- Jonathan Caouette
- Larry Clark
- Abel Ferrara
- Michel Gondry
- Wes Anderson
- Noah Baumbach
- Sofia Coppola
- Kathryn Bigelow
- Allison Anders
- Barbara Kopple
- Shirley Clarke
- Barbara Loden
- Roger Corman
- Paul Bartel
- Herschell Gordon Lewis
- Russ Meyer
- Dwain Esper
- Ray Dennis Steckler
- John Sayles
- Jonathan Demme
- Tom DiCillo
- Carson Davidson
- Doug Liman
- Darren Aronofsky
- Jason Reitman
- Godfrey Reggio
- Ross McElwee
- Alexander Payne
- Kimberly Peirce
- David O. Russell
- Kevin Smith
- David Mamet
- Quentin Tarantino
- Tim Burton
- Neil LaBute
- Todd Solondz
- Terry Zwigoff
- Les Blank
- Christopher Nolan
- Whit Stillman
- Todd Field
- Richard Kelly
- Jean-Pierre Jeunet
- Julian Schnabel
- Jared Hess
- Charlie Kaufman
- Hal Hartley
- David Lynch
- David Cronenberg
- David Fincher
- Steven Soderbergh
- Rob Reiner
- Oliver Stone
- Dennis Hopper
- Shane Carruth
- Anthony Minghella
- Harmony Korine
- Richard Linklater
- Robert Altman
- William Friedkin
- James Cameron
- Damien Chazelle
- Tom Ford
- Michael Moore
- Mel Gibson
- Paul Thomas Anderson
- Vincent Gallo
- Paul Haggis
- Bryan Singer
- James Toback
- Woody Allen

== See also ==
- New Hollywood
- American Eccentric Cinema
- Independent animation
- List of rediscovered films
- Classical Hollywood cinema
- Independent Spirit Awards
- Sundance Film Festival

== Bibliography ==
- Spike, Mike, Slackers, & Dykes: A Guided Tour Across a Decade of American Independent Cinema, John Pierson
- A Killer Life, Christine Vachon
- Down & Dirty Pictures, Peter Biskind
- Indie: An American Film Culture, Michael Z. Newman Ph.D.
- American Independent Cinema, Geoff King
- Enchanted Drawings: The History of Animation, Charles Solomon
- Nightmare USA: The Untold Story of the Exploitation Independents, Stephen Thrower
