= Indiewood =

Specialty films distributed by Hollywood studios

Indiewood (also known as "specialty", "alternative", "indie", or "quality") films are made outside of the Hollywood studio system or traditional arthouse/independent filmmaking system yet managed to be produced, financed and distributed by the two with varying degrees of success and/or failure.

== Background ==
The American independent film, prior to the 1980s and first half of the 1990s, was previously associated with b movies, exploitation films, avant-garde underground cinema (when it was known as the New American Cinema), social and political documentaries, experimental animated shorts (since the mid-1930s featuring works by pioneer animators Mary Ellen Bute and Oskar Fischinger) and social realist dramas.

Throughout the middle of the 1990s, the word "Indiewood" (a.k.a. "indie boom" or "indie film movement") was invented to describe a component of the spectrum of American films in which distinctions exist, it seemed as if Hollywood and the independent sector had become blurred.

== Divisions ==
Indiewood divisions gain from expert experience of the niche industry by hiring leading independent personalities such as Harvey Weinstein from the Disney fold after the exit of the Weinsteins from Miramax, at The Weinstein Company, and James Schamus, former joint head of Good Machine, at Focus Features.

=== Other "mini-major" subdivisions/indie distributors ===
- Searchlight Pictures
- Picturehouse
- Lionsgate
- Neon
- A24
- Orion Pictures
- Samuel Goldwyn Films
- Warner Bros. Clockwork
- Blumhouse Productions
- Sony Pictures Classics
- Independent Film Company
- Magnolia Pictures
- Janus Films
- Kino Lorber
- Roadside Attractions
- Bleecker Street
- Mubi
- Oscilloscope Laboratories
- Lantern Entertainment
- Focus Features
- Castle Rock Entertainment
- Strand Releasing

== Differences from Hollywood ==
The films are often made for far less money than Hollywood films (some films like Robert Townsend's 1987's satire Hollywood Shuffle and Kevin Smith's 1994 Gen X comedy Clerks were funded by using credit cards) and each aspect of the filmmaking process has to undergo less scrutiny by committees. Additionally, within the Indiewood approach the filmmaker can take as long as they need in the post-production phase of their film - whereas in Hollywood they are contracted to finish the film in a specific period of time (usually 10 weeks). In Hollywood, the film then goes on to show in focus group screenings on the studio lot. In Indiewood, the filmmakers can determine the next steps of the film. They also bear striking similarities to as well as were influenced by the "proto-indies" of the 1960s such as Robert Downey Sr's still image film Chafed Elbows (1966), John Cassavetes's Academy Award-nominated Faces and Brian de Palma's Greetings (each from 1968) which in turn were influenced by the culture of the Beat Generation, the polar opposite to the conformist, gray-flannel conformity of 1950s America.

Most Indiewood films are first shown at film festivals with the hopes of further distribution by being picked up (or purchased) by a larger film company or distributor in order to find broader audiences alongside awards consideration (e.g. 2009's A Single Man).

== List of selected Indiewood/Pre-Indiewood filmmakers ==
- Julie Dash
- Cheryl Dunye
- Kathleen Collins
- Lizzie Borden
- Ava DuVernay
- Dee Rees
- Chloe Zhao
- Lulu Wang
- Mira Nair
- Joseph Nobile
- Barry Jenkins
- Billy Woodberry
- Marlon Riggs
- Stanley Nelson
- Charles Burnett

- William Greaves
- Wendell B. Harris Jr.
- Oscar Micheaux
- Ryan Coogler
- Tyler Perry
- Spike Lee

- Reginald Hudlin
- John Singleton
- Robert Townsend
- Walter Salles
- Ramin Bahrani
- Alfonso Cuaron
- Denzel Washington
- Ang Lee
- Lee Daniels
- Daniels
- Wayne Wang
- Lee Isaac Chung
- Lisa Cholodenko
- Mario Van Peebles
- Melvin Van Peebles
- Robert Rodriguez
- Gregory Nava
- Robert M. Young
- Miguel Arteta
- Guillermo del Toro
- Chris Eyre
- Taika Waititi
- Nina Menkes
- Claudia Weill
- Donna Deitch
- Joyce Chopra
- Mary Harron
- Jennie Livingston
- Penelope Spheeris
- Martha Coolidge
- Kelly Reichardt
- Debra Granik
- Alice Wu
- Eliza Hittman
- Susan Seidelman
- Adrienne Shelly
- Joan Micklin Silver
- Ralph Bakshi
- Don Bluth
- Will Vinton
- Suzan Pitt
- Don Hertzfeldt
- Bill Plympton
- John and Faith Hubley
- George Griffin
- Mark Osborne
- Candy Kugel
- Janie Geiser
- Fred Mogubgub
- John Canemaker
- Joanna Priestley
- PES
- Nina Paley
- Nicole Holofcener
- Tom McCarthy
- Alex Garland
- Patty Jenkins
- Sarah Polley
- Sian Heder
- Lena Dunham
- Greta Gerwig
- Miranda July
- Bette Gordon
- Nancy Savoca
- Todd Haynes

- John Waters

- Greg Araki
- Sean Baker
- Lodge Kerrigan
- Alex Ross Perry
- Jeff Nichols
- Mike Nichols
- Henry Jaglom
- Jim McBride
- Jonas Mekas
- Mark Rappaport
- Andrew Bujalski
- John Cameron Mitchell
- Gus Van Sant
- Steve James
- Wim Wenders
- Jim McKay
- Bo Burnham
- Joel and Ethan Coen

- Mark and Jay Duplass
- Sam Raimi
- Josh and Benny Safdie
- Joe Swanberg
- Rian Johnson
- Christopher Guest
- Alan Rudolph
- James Gray
- Andrea Arnold
- Robert Eggers
- George A. Romero
- Wes Craven
- John Carpenter
- Yorgos Lanthimos
- Ari Aster
- Paul Schrader
- Alex Kendrick
- Mike Mills
- Joe Wright
- Jim Jarmusch

- Rob Nilsson
- Zach Braff
- George Clooney
- James Mangold
- Sam Mendes
- Spike Jonze
- Errol Morris

- Martin Scorsese
- Sam Fuller
- John Cassavetes

- Brian de Palma
- Robert Downey Sr
- Norman Mailer
- Andy Warhol
- Kenneth Anger
- Herk Harvey
- Ron Rice
- Robert Frank
- Kent Mackenzie
- Neil Jordan
- James Marsh
- Greg Mottola
- Jon Favreau
- Bennett Miller
- Jonathan Caouette
- Larry Clark
- Abel Ferrara
- Michel Gondry
- Wes Anderson

- Noah Baumbach
- Sofia Coppola
- Kathryn Bigelow
- Allison Anders

- Barbara Kopple
- Shirley Clarke
- Barbara Loden
- Roger Corman
- Paul Bartel
- Herschell Gordon Lewis
- John Sayles
- Jonathan Demme
- Tom DiCillo
- Carson Davidson
- Doug Liman
- Darren Aronofsky
- Jason Reitman
- Godfrey Reggio
- Ross McElwee
- Alexander Payne
- Kimberly Peirce
- David O. Russell
- Kevin Smith

- David Mamet
- Quentin Tarantino

- Tim Burton
- Neil LaBute
- Todd Solondz

- Terry Zwigoff
- David Cronenberg
- Christopher Nolan
- Whit Stillman
- Todd Field
- Richard Kelly
- Jean-Pierre Jeunet
- Julian Schnabel
- Jared Hess
- Charlie Kaufman
- Hal Hartley
- David Lynch

- David Fincher
- Steven Soderbergh

- Rob Reiner
- Oliver Stone
- Dennis Hopper
- Shane Carruth
- Anthony Minghella
- Harmony Korine
- Richard Linklater

- Robert Altman
- William Friedkin
- James Cameron
- Damien Chazelle
- Tom Ford
- Michael Moore

- Mel Gibson
- Paul Thomas Anderson
- Vincent Gallo
- Paul Haggis
- Bryan Singer
- James Toback
- Allen Baron
- Woody Allen

=== List of selected notable and important Pre-Indiewood films ===
==== Pre-1950s ====
- City Lights (1931)≈
- Reefer Madness (1936)
- The Great Dictator (1940)≈
- Rebecca (1940)≈

==== 1950s ====
- Little Fugitive (1953)≈
- Salt of the Earth (1954)≈
- 3rd Ave. El (1955)
- The Adventures of an * (1957)
- Plan 9 from Outer Space (1957)
- Attack of the Crab Monsters (1957)
- On the Bowery (1957)≈
- 12 Angry Men (1957)≈
- The Screaming Skull (1958)
- Attack of the Giant Leeches (1959)
- Moonbird (1959)
- Pull My Daisy (1959)≈
- Shadows (1959)≈
- Some Like It Hot (1959)≈

==== 1960s ====
- The Flower Thief (1960)
- Munro (1960)
- Psycho (1960)≈
- The Savage Eye (1960)
- The Beast of Yucca Flats (1961)
- Blast of Silence (1961)
- The Connection (1961)
- The Exiles (1961)≈
- Something Wild (1961)
- Carnival of Souls (1962)
- The Hole (1962)≈
- Beach Party (1963)
- Blood Feast (1963)
- The Cool World (1963)≈
- The Brig (1964)
- Help! My Snowman's Burning Down (1964)
- Nothing But a Man (1964)≈
- Two Thousand Maniacs (1964)
- Time Piece (1965)
- Vinyl (1965)
- Chafed Elbows (1966)
- Chelsea Girls (1966)
- A Herb Alpert and the Tijuana Brass Double Feature (1966)
- Manos: The Hands of Fate (1966)
- The Wild Angels (1966)
- The Box (1967)
- David Holzman's Diary (1967)≈
- Dont Look Back (1967)≈
- The Graduate (1967)≈
- The Jungle (1967)≈
- Portrait of Jason (1967)≈
- Spider Baby (1967)
- The Trip (1967)
- Who's That Knocking at My Door? (1967)
- Beyond the Law (1968)
- Faces (1968)≈
- Greetings (1968)
- Murder a la Mod (1968)
- Night of the Living Dead (1968)≈
- No More Excuses (1968)
- Symbiopsychotaxiplasm Take One (1968)≈
- Wild 90 (1968)
- Easy Rider (1969)≈
- Midnight Cowboy (1969)≈
- Putney Swope (1969)≈

==== 1970s ====
- The Further Adventures of Uncle Sam (1970)
- Husbands (1970)
- Is It Always Right to Be Right? (1970)
- Maidstone (1970)
- Sweet Sweetback's Baadasssss Song (1970)≈
- Wanda (1970)≈
- Let's Scare Jessica to Death (1971)
- McCabe & Mrs. Miller (1971)≈
- THX-1138 (1971)
- Two-Lane Blacktop (1971)≈
- The Last House on the Left (1972)
- Pink Flamingos (1972)≈
- Badlands (1973)≈
- Coffy (1973)
- Mean Streets (1973)≈
- Messiah of Evil (1973)
- Sisters (1973)
- Benji (1974)
- Dark Star (1974)
- Female Trouble (1974)
- The Texas Chain Saw Massacre (1974)
- A Woman Under the Influence (1974)≈
- Brother, Can You Spare a Dime? (1975)
- Coney (1975)
- Head (1975)
- Hester Street (1975)≈
- The Rocky Horror Picture Show (1975)≈
- Harlan County U.S.A. (1976)≈
- Alambrista! (1977)≈
- Eraserhead (1977)

≈

- The Hills Have Eyes (1977)
- Killer of Sheep (1977)≈
- Opening Night (1977)
- Dawn of the Dead (1978)
- Gates of Heaven (1978)
- Girlfriends (1978)≈
- Halloween (1978)≈
- Martin (1978)
- Northern Lights (1978)
- Piranha (1978)
- The Whole Shootin' Match (1978)
- Asparagus (1979)
- Bush Mama (1979)≈
- Heartland (1979)

=== List of notable and important Indiewood films ===
==== 1980s ====
- Atlantic City (1980)≈
- Friday the 13th (1980)
- The Life and Times of Rosie the Riveter (1980)≈
- Out of the Blue (1980)
- Return of the Secaucus 7 (1980)≈
- The Decline of Western Civilization (1981)≈
- The Evil Dead (1981)
- My Dinner with Andre (1981)
- Polyester (1981)
- Will (1981)
- Zoot Suit (1981)≈
- The Atomic Cafe (1982)≈
- The Ballad of Gregorio Cortez (1982)≈
- Chan Is Missing (1982)≈
- Eating Raoul (1982)
- First Blood (1982)
- Forbidden Zone (1982)
- Illusions (1982)≈
- Liquid Sky (1982)
- Losing Ground (1982)≈
- The Loveless (1982)
- The Secret of NIMH (1982)
- Smithereens (1982)
- White Dog (1982)
- Born in Flames (1983)
- El Norte (1983)≈
- Koyaanisqatsi (1983)≈
- Lianna (1983)
- My Brother's Wedding (1983)
- Seventeen (1983)
- Suburbia (1983)
- Sundae in New York (1983)
- Variety (1983)
- Bless Their Little Hearts (1984)≈
- The Brother from Another Planet (1984)
- Choose Me (1984)
- In Heaven There Is No Beer? (1984)
- The Killing Floor (1984)
- Love Streams (1984)
- A Nightmare on Elm Street (1984)≈
- Paris, Texas (1984)
- Repo Man (1984)
- Stranger Than Paradise (1984)

≈

- Streetwise (1984)
- The Terminator (1984)≈
- This Is Spinal Tap (1984)≈
- The Times of Harvey Milk (1984)≈
- The Adventures of Mark Twain (1985)
- Blood Simple (1985)

- The Breakfast Club (1985)≈
- Desert Hearts (1985)
- Desperately Seeking Susan (1985)≈
- Down By Law (1986)
- Kiss of the Spider Woman (1985)
- Mala Noche (1985)
- Re-Animator (1985)
- Runaway Train (1985)
- Smooth Talk (1985)
- Teen Wolf (1985)
- The Toxic Avenger (1985)
- Trip to Bountiful (1985)
- Blue Velvet (1986)
- Hannah and Her Sisters (1986)
- Hoosiers (1986)≈
- Platoon (1986)≈
- Parting Glances (1986)
- Salvador (1986)
- She's Gotta Have It (1986)

≈

- Sherman's March (1986)≈
- Something Wild (1986)
- Stand by Me (1986)
- True Stories (1986)
- Working Girls (1986)
- The Big Easy (1987)
- Border Radio (1987)
- The Brave Little Toaster (1987)
- Dirty Dancing (1987)
- Evil Dead II (1987)
- Hollywood Shuffle (1987)
- House of Games (1987)
- Matewan (1987)≈
- Near Dark (1987)
- Raising Arizona (1987)
- River's Edge (1987)
- Your Face (1987)
- The Decline of Western Civilization Part II: The Metal Years (1988)
- Earth Girls Are Easy (1988)
- Eight Men Out (1988)
- Hairspray (1988)≈
- Heat and Sunlight (1988)
- Ko-Ko (1988)
- Lady in White (1988)
- Let's Get Lost (1988)
- The Moderns (1988)
- Patty Hearst (1988)
- Powaqqatsi (1988)
- Running on Empty (1988)
- Stand and Deliver (1988)≈
- The Thin Blue Line (1988)≈
- Torch Song Trilogy (1988)
- All Dogs Go to Heaven (1989)
- Chameleon Street (1989)
- Common Threads: Stories from the Quilt (1989)
- Do the Right Thing (1989)≈
- Drugstore Cowboy (1989)
- Heathers (1989)
- Longtime Companion (1989)
- Roger & Me (1989)

≈

- Sex, Lies, and Videotape (1989)

≈

- Sidewalk Stories (1989)
- True Love (1989)
- The Unbelievable Truth (1989)

==== 1990s ====
- All My Relations (1990)
- The Grifters (1990)
- House Party (1990)≈
- Jacob's Ladder (1990)
- Metropolitan (1990)
- Miller's Crossing (1990)
- Mountains of the Moon (1990)
- Paris Is Burning (1990)≈
- Pump Up the Volume (1990)
- Sink or Swim (1990)≈
- Teenage Mutant Ninja Turtles (1990)
- To Sleep with Anger (1990)≈
- Total Recall (1990)
- Trust (1990)
- Wild at Heart (1990)
- Barton Fink (1991)
- Daughters of the Dust (1991)≈
- Dogfight (1991)
- Fast Food Matador (1991)
- Homicide (1991)
- L.A. Story (1991)
- Truth or Dare (1991)
- Mississippi Masala (1991)
- My Own Private Idaho (1991)
- Night on Earth (1991)
- Poison (1991)

- Queen of Diamonds (1991)≈
- Rambling Rose (1991)
- The Rapture (1991)
- Rock-a-Doodle (1991)
- Slacker (1991)

≈

- Straight Out of Brooklyn (1991)
- Terminator 2: Judgment Day (1991)≈
- American Me (1992)
- Bad Lieutenant (1992)
- Basic Instinct (1992)
- Bob Roberts (1992)
- A Brief History of Time (1992)
- Ferngully: The Last Rainforest (1992)
- Gas Food Lodging (1992)
- Glengarry Glen Ross (1992)
- In the Soup (1992)
- The Living End (1992)
- Passion Fish (1992)
- The Player (1992)
- Reservoir Dogs (1992)

- Simple Men (1992)
- Swoon (1992)
- Twin Peaks: Fire Walk with Me (1992)
- Dazed and Confused (1993)
- El Mariachi (1993)≈
- Menace II Society (1993)
- Mi Vida Loca (1993)
- Red Rock West (1993)
- Ruby in Paradise (1993)
- Short Cuts (1993)
- Suture (1993)
- The Wedding Banquet (1993)≈
- Clean, Shaven (1994)
- Clerks (1994)

≈

- Dumb and Dumber (1994)
- Fresh (1994)
- Go Fish (1994)
- Hoop Dreams (1994)≈
- The Hudsucker Proxy (1994)
- I Like It Like That (1994)
- The Last Seduction (1994)
- Little Odessa (1994)
- Mrs. Parker and the Vicious Circle (1994)
- Pulp Fiction (1994)

≈

- The Red Book (1994)≈
- Reality Bites (1994)
- River of Grass (1994)
- Serial Mom (1994)
- Spanking the Monkey (1994)
- Thumbelina (1994)
- What Happened Was... (1994)
- Altair (1995)
- Before Sunrise (1995)
- The Brothers McMullen (1995)
- Closer to Home (1995)
- Crumb (1995)
- Dead Man (1995)
- Dead Man Walking (1995)
- The Doom Generation (1995)
- Friday (1995)
- Kicking and Screaming (1995)
- Kids (1995)
- Leaving Las Vegas (1995)
- Living in Oblivion (1995)
- The Pebble and the Penguin (1995)
- Safe (1995)
- Se7en (1995)
- Smoke (1995)
- The Usual Suspects (1995)
- Basquiat (1996)
- Big Night (1996)
- Bottle Rocket (1996)
- Box of Moonlight (1996)
- Citizen Ruth (1996)
- The Daytrippers (1996)
- The English Patient (1996)
- Fargo (1996)≈
- Flirting with Disaster (1996)
- Hard Eight (1996)
- I Shot Andy Warhol (1996)
- Lone Star (1996)
- Mystery Science Theater 3000: The Movie (1996)
- Schizopolis (1996)
- Sling Blade (1996)
- The Spitfire Grill (1996)
- Swingers (1996)

- Trees Lounge (1996)
- Waiting for Guffman (1996)
- Walking and Talking (1996)
- The Watermelon Woman (1996)≈
- Welcome to the Dollhouse (1996)

- When We Were Kings (1996)
- The Apostle (1997)
- Chasing Amy (1997)
- Cop Land (1997)
- Eve's Bayou (1997)≈
- Good Will Hunting (1997)
- Grosse Pointe Blank (1997)
- Gummo (1997)
- Henry Fool (1997)
- In the Company of Men (1997)
- Jackie Brown (1997)
- Lost Highway (1997)
- Love Jones (1997)
- Ulee's Gold (1997)
- American History X (1998)
- The Big Lebowski (1998)≈
- Boogie Nights (1998)
- Buffalo 66 (1998)
- Gods and Monsters (1998)
- Happiness (1998)
- High Art (1998)
- More (1998)
- New Rose Hotel (1998)
- The Opposite of Sex (1998)
- Next Stop Wonderland (1998)
- Pi (1998)
- Rushmore (1998)≈
- Shakespeare in Love (1998)
- Slam (1998)
- Smoke Signals (1998)≈
- The Spanish Prisoner (1998)
- Velvet Goldmine (1998)
- American Beauty (1999)
- American Movie (1999)
- Being John Malkovich (1999)
- The Blair Witch Project (1999)

- The Boondock Saints (1999)
- Boys Don't Cry (1999)≈
- Buena Vista Social Club (1999)≈
- Cruel Intentions (1999)
- Dogma (1999)
- Election (1999)
- Fight Club (1999)
- Ghost Dog: The Way of the Samurai (1999)
- Julien Donkey-Boy (1999)
- Magnolia (1999)
- The Sixth Sense (1999)
- Star Wars: The Phantom Menace (1999)
- The Straight Story (1999)
- The Talented Mr. Ripley (1999)
- Three Kings (1999)
- The Virgin Suicides (1999)

==== 2000s ====
- Almost Famous (2000)
- American Psycho (2000)
- Best in Show (2000)
- Chuck & Buck (2000)
- Finding Forrester (2000)
- George Washington (2000)
- Girlfight (2000)
- Memento (2000)≈
- Nurse Betty (2000)
- O Brother, Where Art Thou? (2000)
- Pitch Black (2000)
- Rejected (2000)
- Requiem for a Dream (2000)
- State and Main (2000)
- Traffic (2000)
- The Yards (2000)
- You Can Count on Me (2000)
- Donnie Darko (2001)
- Ghost World (2001)
- Hedwig and the Angry Inch (2001)
- In the Bedroom (2001)
- Jay and Silent Bob Strike Back (2001)
- The Lord of the Rings: The Fellowship of the Ring (2001)≈
- The Man Who Wasn't There (2001)
- Monster's Ball (2001)
- Mulholland Drive (2001)
- The Royal Tenenbaums (2001)
- Waking Life (2001)
- Y Tu Mama Tambien (2001)
- Adaptation (2002)
- Antwone Fisher (2002)
- Bend It Like Beckham (2002)
- Bowling for Columbine (2002)
- Chicago (2002)
- Far from Heaven (2002)
- Funny Ha Ha (2002)
- Gangs of New York (2002)
- Gerry (2002)
- Laurel Canyon (2002)
- My Big Fat Greek Wedding (2002)
- Naqoyqatsi (2002)
- Personal Velocity (2002)
- Punch-Drunk Love (2002)
- Real Women Have Curves (2002)≈
- Roger Dodger (2002)
- Secretary (2002)
- Solaris (2002)
- Spellbound (2002)
- 25th Hour (2002)
- American Splendor (2003)
- Capturing the Friedmans (2003)
- Coffee and Cigarettes (2003)
- Cold Mountain (2003)
- The Cooler (2003)
- Elephant (2003)
- The Fog of War (2003)≈
- Girl with a Pearl Earring (2003)
- In America (2003)
- Kill Bill Volume 1 (2003)
- Lost in Translation (2003)

- Monster (2003)
- Open Water (2003)
- The Room (2003)
- Shattered Glass (2003)
- The Station Agent (2003)
- Taranation (2003)
- Thirteen (2003)
- 21 Grams (2003)
- The Aviator (2004)
- Baadasssss! (2004)
- Before Sunset (2004)
- Eternal Sunshine of the Spotless Mind (2004)
- Fahrenheit 9/11 (2004)
- Garden State (2004)
- Keane (2004)
- The Life Aquatic with Steve Zissou (2004)
- Maria Full of Grace (2004)
- Mean Creek (2004)
- The Motorcycle Diaries (2004)
- Napoleon Dynamite (2004)
- Palindromes (2004)
- The Passion of the Christ (2004)
- Primer (2004)
- Saw (2004)
- Sideways (2004)
- Silver City (2004)
- Super Size Me (2004)
- Take Out (2004)
- A Very Long Engagement (2004)
- We Don't Live Here Anymore (2004)
- The Aristocrats (2005)
- Brick (2005)
- Brokeback Mountain (2005)≈
- Capote (2005)
- Corpse Bride (2005)
- Crash (2005)
- Diary of a Mad Black Woman (2005)
- Good Night and Good Luck (2005)
- Hostel (2005)
- Hustle & Flow (2005)
- Man Push Cart (2005)
- Me and You and Everyone We Know (2005)
- Mutual Appreciation (2005)
- The Notorious Betty Page (2005)
- Pride & Prejudice (2005)
- The Puffy Chair (2005)
- The Squid and the Whale (2005)
- Syriana (2005)
- Babel (2006)
- Bobby (2006)
- Facing the Giants (2006)
- For Your Consideration (2006)
- Friends with Money (2006)
- Half Nelson (2006)
- An Inconvenient Truth (2006)
- Iraq in Fragments (2006)
- Inland Empire (2006)
- Jonestown: The Life and Death of Peoples Temple (2006)
- Jesus Camp (2006)
- Little Children (2006)
- Little Miss Sunshine (2006)

- Marie Antoinette (2006)
- Nacho Libre (2006)
- The Namesake (2006)
- Old Joy (2006)
- The Painted Veil (2006)
- Pan's Labyrinth (2006)
- A Prairie Home Companion (2006)
- Quinceañera (2006)
- A Scanner Darkly (2006)
- Southland Tales (2006)
- Thank You for Smoking (2006)
- The Darjeeling Limited (2007)
- The Diving Bell and the Butterfly (2007)
- I'm Not There (2007)
- In Bruges (2007)
- In the Valley of Elah (2007)
- Juno (2007)
- Margot at the Wedding (2007)
- A Mighty Heart (2007)
- No Country for Old Men (2007)
- No End in Sight (2007)
- Paranormal Activity (2007)
- The Savages (2007)
- Sicko (2007)
- Sunshine (2007)
- There Will Be Blood (2007)
- Waitress (2007)
- The Visitor (2007)
- American Teen (2008)
- Baghead (2008)
- Be Kind Rewind (2008)
- Fireproof (2008)
- Frozen River (2008)
- In Search of a Midnight Kiss (2008)
- Man on Wire (2008)
- Rachel Getting Married (2008)
- Sita Sings the Blues (2008)
- Synecdoche, New York (2008)
- Twilight (2008)
- Tyson (2008)
- Wendy and Lucy (2008)
- The Wrestler (2008)
- Adventureland (2009)
- Away We Go (2009)
- Coraline (2009)
- The Cove (2009)
- Fantastic Mr. Fox (2009)
- 500 Days of Summer (2009)
- The Hurt Locker (2009)≈
- Inglourious Basterds (2009)
- Moon (2009)
- Precious (2009)
- Revolutionary Road (2009)
- A Serious Man (2009)
- A Single Man (2009)
- Sin Nombre (2009)
- Trash Humpers (2009)

==== 2010s ====
- Beginners (2010)
- Black Swan (2010)
- Blue Valentine (2010)
- Catfish (2010)
- Greenberg (2010)
- Inside Job (2010)
- The Kids Are All Right (2010)
- The King's Speech (2010)
- Meek's Cutoff (2010)
- Winter's Bone (2010)
- The Color Wheel (2011)
- Damsels in Distress (2011)
- The Descendants (2011)
- Drive (2011)
- The Future (2011)
- Martha Marcy May Marlene (2011)
- Pariah (2011)≈
- Project Nim (2011)
- Take Shelter (2011)
- The Tree of Life (2011)
- Young Adult (2011)
- Beasts of the Southern Wild (2012)
- Frances Ha (2012)
- Fresh Guacamole (2012)
- It's Such a Beautiful Day (2012)
- The Master (2012)
- Middle of Nowhere (2012)
- Paranorman (2012)
- The Place Beyond the Pines (2012)
- Spring Breakers (2012)
- Dallas Buyers Club (2013)
- Fruitvale Station (2013)
- Moonrise Kingdom (2013)
- Nebraska (2013)
- Only God Forgives (2013)
- 12 Years a Slave (2013)≈
- The Wolf of Wall Street (2013)
- Birdman (2014)
- The Boxtrolls (2014)
- Boyhood (2014)
- Ex Machina (2014)
- Foxcatcher (2014)
- Grand Budapest Hotel (2014)
- The Imitation Game (2014)
- Listen Up Philip (2014)
- Nightcrawler (2014)
- The Theory of Everything (2014)
- Whiplash (2014)
- Dope (2015)
- It Follows (2015)
- Me and Earl and the Dying Girl (2015)
- Spotlight (2015)
- Tangerine (2015)
- The VVitch (2015)
- World of Tomorrow (2015)
- American Honey (2016)
- Hunt for the Wilderpeople (2016)
- Manchester by the Sea (2016)
- Moonlight (2016)
- Swiss Army Man (2016)
- 20th Century Women (2016)
- Weiner (2016)
- Call Me by Your Name (2017)
- The Disaster Artist (2017)
- First Reformed (2017)
- The Florida Project (2017)
- Get Out (2017)
- Good Time (2017)
- I, Tonya (2017)
- Lady Bird (2017)
- Phantom Thread (2017)
- The Shape of Water (2017)
- Eighth Grade (2018)
- The Favourite (2018)
- Hereditary (2018)
- Isle of Dogs (2018)
- The Last Black Man in San Francisco (2018)
- The Rider (2018)
- Waves (2018)
- Whitney (2018)
- The Farewell (2019)
- First Cow (2019)
- Jojo Rabbit (2019)
- The Lighthouse (2019)
- The Peanut Butter Falcon (2019)
- Uncut Gems (2019)

==== 2020s ====
- Cryptozoo (2020)
- Kajillionaire (2020)
- Minari (2020)
- Nomadland (2020)
- Zola (2020)
- CODA (2021)
- Jockey (2021)
- Summer of Soul (2021)
- Everything Everywhere All at Once (2022)
- Marcel the Shell with Shoes On (2022)
- My Year of Dicks (2022)
- Tár (2022)
- The Whale (2022)
- Going to Mars: The Nikki Giovanni Project (2023)
- Kokomo City (2023)
- Sound of Freedom (2023)

== See also ==
- L.A. Rebellion
- Peak TV
- American Eccentric Cinema
- New Hollywood
- Postmodernist film
- Oscar bait
- Arthouse animation
- Sundance Film Festival
- Sleeper hit
- European art cinema
- Independent Spirit Awards
- Mumblecore
- Arthouse action film
- Modernist film
- Arthouse science fiction film
- Arthouse musical
- Arthouse animation
- Independent animation
- Arthouse film
- Independent film

== Notes ==
- ≈ indicates a National Film Registry inductee

== Bibliography ==
- Spike, Mike, Slackers, & Dykes: A Guided Tour Across a Decade of American Independent Cinema, John Pierson
- A Killer Life, Christine Vachon
- Down & Dirty Pictures, Peter Biskind
- Indie: An American Film Culture, Michael Z. Newman Ph.D.
- American Independent Cinema, Geoff King
- Enchanted Drawings: The History of Animation, Charles Solomon
