= Experimental animation =

Type of animation

Experimental animation uses various forms, shapes, colour and texture.

Experimental animation is a form of animation in which motion pictures have their own rhythm and movement where it has no narration or a specific structure in animated films. It is considered to be subjective and non-linear that deals with philosophic and spiritual concerns that the artists and film-makers convey.

U.S. and European abstract artists and animators play an important role of developing experimental animation during the 1920s and 1930s onwards.

Well-known animated studios, such as Walt Disney Animation Studios and Pixar, use the elements of experimental animation as tools for their short- and long-length animated films.

== History ==
Abstract and various forms of experimental animation have come a long way to become part of the traditional arts, where they have been spreading across a large number of art exhibitions, animation festivals, books and videos that relate to experimental animation. A majority of experimental animators were aware that their works were not getting enough recognition in the entertainment world, such as movies and music. However, they have been able to use animation as a medium that is used to deliver their messages or concerns to the public. Animators are able to use their animation skills in order to get involved in money-earning activities, such as family-friendly movies and TV shows, TV commercials and music videos.

=== Europe ===
In 1912, Leopold Survage began his series of abstract watercolour paintings called the ‘Colored Rhythm’, where he planned them in motion by using film animation techniques. However, he found no one who was willing to animate his work so he postponed his project and then committed to painting for the rest of his life. During the same period, Viking Eggeling was struggling with the concept of abstract images as a universal language, and he was yet unaware that motion picture was a medium. Although there was no concrete evidence that Eggeling knew about Survage’s project, it was likely that he had heard or read about it since his friend, Amedeo Modigliani knew Survage well enough and that both have a mutual close friend, Tristan Tzara. Tzara introduced Eggeling to Hans Richter which led them to pursue a meaningful discovery of abstract forms by using moving pictures. Throughout this journey, Eggeling created ‘Diagonal Symphony' and Richter made 'Rhythm 21', 'Rhythm 23' and 'Rhythm 25'. Before these films were produced, Walter Ruttmann displayed his hand-coloured abstract film ‘Lightplay Opus I’ in Germany, which was described by Bernhard Diebold as “a new art, the vision-music of films”. Diebold's role in influencing the early abstract animators remained unclear as he reviewed paintings, dance, music and films in 1916. However, he was a mentor to Oskar Fischinger who started to do experimental animation during the first screening of Ruttmann's film.

Music was later incorporated in these early abstract animators’ works. Survage, Eggeling and Richter shared a common interest and history in music in which they had given it up in order to pursue their art career. While they struggled with their first abstract designs, Ferruccio Busoni gained their attention where he suggested that they should broaden their understanding of abstract art by playing Bach’s preludes and fugues. Ruttmann and Fischinger also had a music history before doing art. Fischinger was the first to combine technical, musical and artistic talent in his works as well as being the first to make abstract animation be part of his art career.

By 1935, abstract animation films gained more recognition in England, where Len Lye and Norman McLaren brought new ideas of using sound and colour in animation. While abstract animation was succeeding in Europe, Fischinger, McLaren and Lye continued creating experimental animation North America to continue their abstract animation careers in which experimental animation was remained as a North American art since then.

While the early abstract animators in Europe become an enormous part of the historical movement in abstract art and animation, the quality of their artistry in their works attracts people’s attention. Although many films are barely receiving full recognition, they are continuing to grow rather than diminishing in value and animators that their works receive more recognition from a large audience by using video, computer and broadcast technologies.

=== United States ===
Abstract animation began to develop in New York and California. In the 1940s, Oskar Fischinger, Norman McLaren, John and James Whitney and Dwinell Grant were given grants for their abstract films by the Solomon Guggenheim Foundation with Baroness Hilla Rebay as its director.

Most American abstract animators had their films displayed at special programs in The Museum of Modern Art or Cinema 16, which is a New York City film society founded by Amos Vogel. Cinema 16 held monthly programs of experimental and documentary films and its success inspired smaller film societies in other locations, particularly college towns. For instance, Art in Cinema was presented at the San Francisco Museum of Art which was organised by Richard Foster and Frank Stauffacher. In the 1950s, Perry Miller’s Film Advisory Center sponsored several Art Film Festivals in New York City to present experimental animation created by Mary Ellen Bute, Douglass Crockwell and Francis Lee, as well as documentaries about artists and art.

Some American abstract animators were inspired or influenced by the European abstract animators. For instance, Robert Bruce Rogers was under the influence of Oskar Fischinger by incorporating music into his “motion painting” when he presented his film ‘Motion Painting No. 3 – Rhapsody’ (1951). His film was based on Liszt’s Hungarian Rhapsody No. 6 and composed a “three-dimensional space contrivance of [his] own, the field of operations being a foreshortened replica of the ultimate projection beam – a pyramided field, roughly 23 inches by 32 inches at the base of background limit, and 38 inches from camera aperture as apex”. Although Rogers’ abstract films no longer existed, he was considered as one of the American creators in abstract animation.

Oskar Fischinger, John and James Whitney and Harry Smith were the major animators of the new generation experimental animation in the West Coast. Hy Hirsh and Jordan Belson later became part of the American pioneers in abstract animation, where they created their own abstract films by using superimposed oscilloscope patterns printed in coloured filters. Their abstract film ‘Come Closer’ (1953) was presented in the San Francisco Museum of Arts for the Art in Cinema festivals, and it was known to be “the first abstract film in 3D”.

== Impacts ==
Hundreds of students have enrolled in animation classes every year as experimental animation begins to expand in art schools, colleges and universities. A majority of students have attended these classes because they have an interest in learning the skills that can help them become employable. Meanwhile, others attended animation classes as they see animation as an art medium that they relate or can express themselves. Jules Engel believes that the future of experimental animation, which he calls fine art animation, depends on people who will promote the abstract film as galleries.

Women have been given an opportunity in colleges and art school to learn animation skills and become animators in their own rights. In the 1970s, the first wave of animated films has been made where women are able to express themselves and their emotional autobiographies. Additionally, the female characters in animated films have developed personalities as they show their emotions. However, many female animators have abandoned their animated film careers so they can work on live-action films. This does not indicate that animation is failing; instead, it gives the animators a better understanding and experience on the animation process. It is also their decision to continue to further pursue their animation careers due to their skills, character and commitment.

The growth of technology, computer science and electronic communication is producing profound changes in the cultural environment, which have significantly affected people’s perceptions of the world. Due to experimental animation, young animators are currently focusing on using their creative abilities in television advertising and music videos rather than devoting themselves to art projects.

=== Experimental Animation in the Expanded Cinema ===
Gene Youngblood's book Expanded Cinema is believed to be the originator of the 'Expanded Cinema' movement, where film is considered as an art form and establishes the field of media arts. Youngblood also explains that expanded cinema requires consciousness that can reach through the cinematic technologies. His main objective is for motion picture to take part in the art media by using film as a means to reject the expectations of industry standardization.

Intermedia practice and theory are known to be the central aspect of the expanded cinema and experimental animation, where animators use different qualities of media in their films. Stan VanDerBeek is known to bridge experimental animation and the Expanded Cinema as he is fascinated with free movements in animation when employing different forms of art forms in his film 'Move Movies' (1965). He is also considered to be the founder in intermedia as his work stresses the differential qualities of the media combined.

Abstraction also plays a significant role in uniting experimental animation and the Expanded Cinema. Abstract films bring imagery that may carry no real-world references but also encompasses to capture a deeper meaning that can shape the society's traditional perspectives and expectations of the real world. And they can be presented in range of traditional animation to computer animation. There are various connections between the Expanded Cinema, experimental animation and film, and the wider arts.

== Elements of Experimental Animation ==
=== Abstraction ===
Experimental animation is subjective, which is the purest and complex form of animation. It requires the artist to invent unique forms, shapes and colours that have their own rhythm and movement in a new and experimental way.

=== Specific Non-Continuity ===
Experimental animation has no logical and linear continuity. It defines itself to have illogical, irrational and multiple connections in animated films due to the fact that it ignores the narrative or storytelling structure.

=== Interpretive Form ===
Experimental animation ignores the conservative and predictable nature the exterior world because it generally focuses the abstract forms in motion. Because of its subjective nature, the audiences have different perspectives as they interpret the experimental animated works on their own and create their own meanings and speculations that are beyond the surface value. Therefore, experimental animation uses animation in a metaphoric way, yet it is not entirely supporting the area of the purely

An example of experimental animation

abstract.

=== Evolution of Materiality ===
Forms, shapes and colours are primarily focused in which they symbolise and evoke the artist or filmmaker's emotions and thoughts in experimental animation. Filmmakers suggest that these aspects should have its own rights on their rhythm and movement rather than being involved with a specific structure of a narrative.

=== Multiple Styles ===
Different styles of animation are combined in experimental animation in which it operates by assisting the multiple layers of the artist's personal foresights. It also operates by challenging and re-working the structure of orthodox animation and create new effects of the animation.

=== Presence of the Artist ===
Experimental animation is known to be personal, subjective and original responses that the artists convey on particular topics. Due to the emotional and spiritual relationship between the artist and his or her work, the audiences also develop emotional, philosophical and spiritual connections with the artist. Experimental animation focuses on the philosophic and spiritual concerns as well as personal feelings from the artist or filmmaker.

=== Dynamics of Musicality ===
There is a strong relationship between experimental animation and music where music can be visualised as colours and shapes that can move in different rhythms and speeds. It is also stated that "animation and sound have a psychological and emotional relationship that can be expressed through the free form which characterises animation". Experimental animation often resists the dialogue, clichéd sound effects and easy emotiveness of certain music genres. Instead, silence, an avant-garde score and unusual sounds are used in experimental animated films to create a variety of deeper messages that the artist or film-maker conveys.

== Difference Between Orthodox Animation and Experimental Animation ==
While experimental animation is subjective and non-linear, orthodox animation is commonly used as the most appropriate method for cartoons where the figures can be identified as an orthodox human being and creature. Orthodox animation has a specific or logical continuity by prioritising the character and context to make a scenario whereas experimental animation has non-linear and multiple continuities that has no context. It is also important to know that orthodox animation has a narrative form that is held in place by the specific continuity. It wants the audiences to focus on its content, specifically on the character and narrative rather than focusing on the colours, designs and materials that shows the lack of the artist's presence in his or her work. While experimental animation has multiple layers and styles, orthodox animation remains consistent, that is, having a fixed two-dimensional style instead of the three-dimensional modes. In orthodox animation, cartoon characters are often defined by the dynamics of dialogue; for example, Bugs Bunny has been a popular character in Warner Brothers’ Looney Tunes due to his iconic carrot-munching saying, “What’s up, doc?”.

== Influences on mainstream animated films ==
=== Walt Disney's Fantasia ===
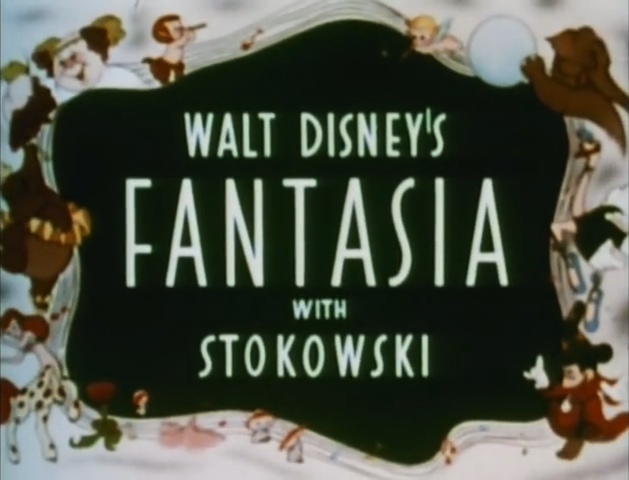
Walt Disney's Fantasia (1940) with Leopold Stokowski

Film critic Leonard Maltin describes Walt Disney as a futurist, surrealist and abstract artist, particularly when he had created Fantasia (1940) which remains as “one of the most astonishing films ever to come from Hollywood”. John C. Flinn Sr. (1940) defines Fantasia as a successful experiment that highlights the relationship between animation and classical music. Disney had collaborated with his own staff of highly-trained animators and story-tellers along with Leopold Stokowski and the Philadelphia Symphony orchestra. The film illustrates how classical music is represented through the animators’ unique and creative drawings and colourings.

Its sequel Fantasia 2000 (1999) incorporates classical music as well as modern music. In the opening scene, it launched Beethoven's Symphony No. 5 which is visually represented by the abstract movements of butterfly-like triangles that moves on cue to the music. On its third segment, George Gershwin's Rhapsody in Blue was presented through the use of lines drawings and abstract designs (in the style of cartoonist Al Hirschfeld) and fragmentary stories to illustrate emotional tales that parallel to the music.

== List of notable experimental animators ==
- Sally Cruikshank
- Mary Ellen Bute
- Suzan Pitt
- Joanna Priestley
- Adam Beckett
- Frank Mouris
- Standish Lawder
- Harry Everett Smith
- Stan Vanderbeek
- George Griffin
- Fred Mogubgub
- Paul Glabicki
- Eric Leiser
- Carmen D'Avino
- Jan Švankmajer

== List of notable experimental animated films ==
- Bimbo's Initiation (1931)
- The Peanut Vendor (1933)
- Early Abstractions (1946–57)
- Gumbasia (1953)
- Odds & Odds (1959)
- Blazes (1961)
- Thanatopsis (1962)
- Pianissimo (1963)
- The Pop Show (1966)
- Escalation (1968)
- Bambi Meets Godzilla (1969)
- Merry Christmas (1969)
- Belladonna of Sadness (1973)
- Fantastic Planet (1973)
- Frank Film (1973)
- Quasi at the Quackadero (1975)
- Furies (1977)
- Pencil Booklings (1978)
- Asparagus (1979)
- Bubble Bath (1979)
- Moon Breath Beat (1980)
- Thunder (1982)
- Ace of Light (1984)
- Hair Piece: A Film for Nappy-Headed People (1985)
- Voices (1985)
- Buzz Box (1985)
- Bring Me the Head of Charlie Brown (1986)
- Ko-Ko (1988)
- The Wizard of Speed and Time (1989)
- Choreography for Copy Machine (Photocopy Cha Cha) (1991)
- Waking Life (2001)
- Renaissance (2006)
- It's Such a Beautiful Day (2012)
- The Wolf House (2018)
- Klaus (2019)
- Mad God (2021)
- Flow (2024)

== See also ==
- Abstract art
- Arthouse animation
- Experimental film
- Independent animation
- Midnight film
