= Case Study: LSD =

Case Study:LSD
- Production company: Lockheed Corporation
- Distributed by: Fantoma Films (2001 DVD release)
- Release date: 1969
- Running time: 4 minutes

Case Study: LSD is a 1969 anti-drug documentary film produced by Lockheed Corporation. It is one of four anti-drug "case study" shorts produced by Lockheed.

== Reception and legacy ==
Featuring a scene with a hallucinated talking hot dog, it has been described as "backed by strange psychedelic visuals and free of preaching and pat conclusions", "comically exaggerated", "unintentionally funny" "This Is Your Wiener On Drugs" (referencing the 1980s Partnership for a Drug-Free America This Is Your Brain on Drugs campaign), and sarcastically credited for "kickstarting the vegetarian craze".

== Home media ==
The short is part of Fantoma Films' The Educational Archives ephemeral film DVD series in the Sex & Drugs collection.

== See also ==
- Marijuana, a 1968 film also narrated by Sonny Bono
- Counterculture of the 1960s
- Still image film
