= Railway with a Heart of Gold =

Railway short documentary

- Directed by: Carson Davidson
- Produced by: Carson Davidson
- Music by: Judd Woldin
- Release date: 1965
- Running time: 15 minutes
- Country: United Kingdom
- Language: English

Railway with a Heart of Gold is a 1965 short documentary film about the Talyllyn Railway in Mid-Wales, filmed by American filmmaker Kit Davidson. Filmed in 1953, it portrays the operation of the railway and experiences of the volunteers in the early years of its preservation.

== Background ==
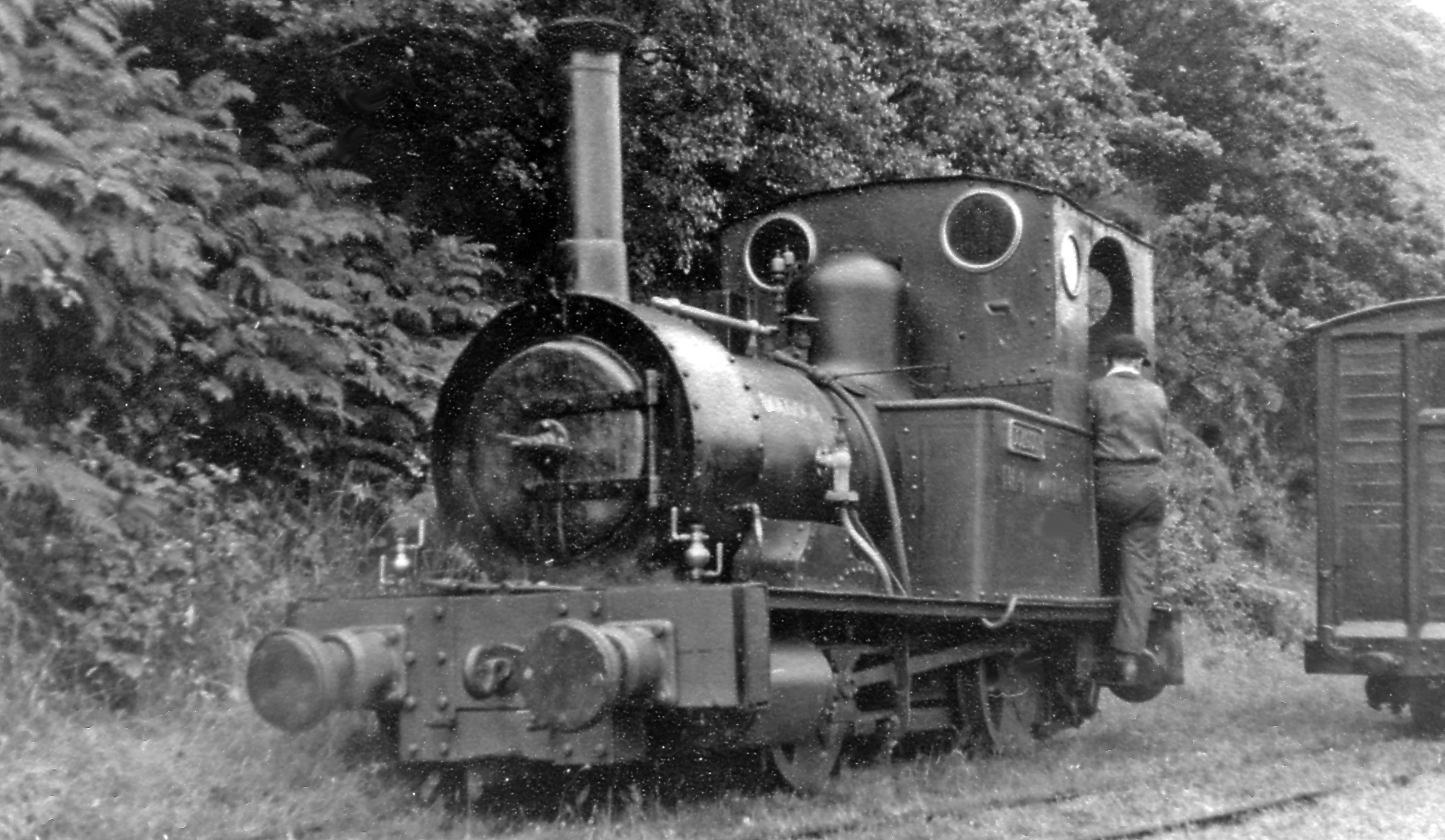
Loco No. 2 Dolgoch in 1951, showing the neglected state of the track at the time. By the time of filming some improvements had been made, but much work was still required

The Talyllyn Railway is a 2 ft 3 in (686 mm) narrow-gauge railway, opened in 1865 to carry slate from the quarries at Bryn Eglwys to Tywyn (then spelt Towyn) on the Welsh coast. The quarries had closed by 1946 and the railway was in very poor state of repair; very little maintenance had been carried out for many years. The owner of the railway, Sir Henry Haydn Jones, died in 1950 and the railway looked likely to close. However the world's first railway preservation society was formed to take over the railway by volunteers, or in Davidson's words: "'It's too nice to scrap,' they said. 'Please, couldn't we have it instead?' And they could."

== Locomotives ==
At the time of filming, three locomotives were operational on the railway: No. 2, Dolgoch, and former Corris Railway locomotives Sir Haydn and Edward Thomas, though Edward Thomas does not appear in the film. Dolgoch, referred to in the film as "The Old Lady", was badly worn out. After appearing in the film Dolgoch saw little use before its boiler was condemned and the loco was sent away to be extensively rebuilt.

== Content ==
A screenshot from the film, showing Sir Haydn off the track after Davidson recorded the derailment

The film captures various aspects of the early preservation era, and many of the people appearing in the film were genuine volunteers. The driver of Dolgoch, however, was played by an actor, Peter Assender. In the opening scene, the driver is shown to throw away a piece that fell off the engine, as he did not know what it was. Davidson later admitted "The falling off bit was fictitious, and I'd never do it now. Corny, as we say in the States". Despite this, most of the film was a record of the day-to-day operation of the railway at the time. One genuine incident was the derailment of locomotive Sir Haydn on a down train due to the poor state of the track. This was captured unexpectedly by Davidson whilst he was attached to the side of the train, and as such has a "homemade" feel. The rest of the film is of far higher quality than most British railway documentaries made by enthusiasts at the time.

Among the volunteers who appear in the film are John Snell, who was the driver of the derailed train and later became managing director of the Romney, Hythe and Dymchurch Railway, and John Bate, who later became the Talyllyn's chief engineer.

== Filming ==
Davidson decided to make the film after he discovered the Talyllyn Railway whilst on holiday in Wales. The film was produced, directed and shot by Davidson over a period of six months in the summer and autumn of 1953, though it was not released until 1965. It was produced on 16mm colour cine film, with music composed by Judd Woldin.

== Reception and legacy ==
Chris Leigh wrote of the film: "[Davidson] deserves our gratitude, for he has produced a fine record of the start of preservation, absolutely unique, the reality behind The Titfield Thunderbolt, which itself was inspired by the early days of the Talyllyn."

In 1990, David Potter described the film as "by far the best on the TR so far".

The film has been shown on national television and at Edinburgh and Venice Film Festivals, and was preserved by the Academy Film Archive in 2012.

The title of the film has been adopted as a slogan of the Talyllyn Railway, and appears in their literature and promotional material.
