= Marijuana (1968 film) =

1968 film by Max O. Miller

- Directed by: Max Miller
- Narrated by: Sonny Bono
- Music by: Gene Clark (composer)
- Distributed by: Avanti Films
- Release date: 1968

Marijuana is a 34-minute 1968 anti-drug documentary film by Max Miller and distributed by Avanti Films. It is narrated by Sonny Bono. It was described as "the first major film effort to center upon the use and possible risks of marijuana", in which "arguments for and against its use are presented and the accumulation of arguments against is allowed to speak for itself". Music for the documentary was composed by the Byrds' Gene Clark, a "bizarre" choice in his musical career, resulting in "meandering blues and pseudo-psychedelic instrumental jams".

== See also ==
- Case Study: LSD, a 1969 film also narrated by Sonny Bono
