= Malice in Wonderland (1982 film) =

Short film by Vince Collins

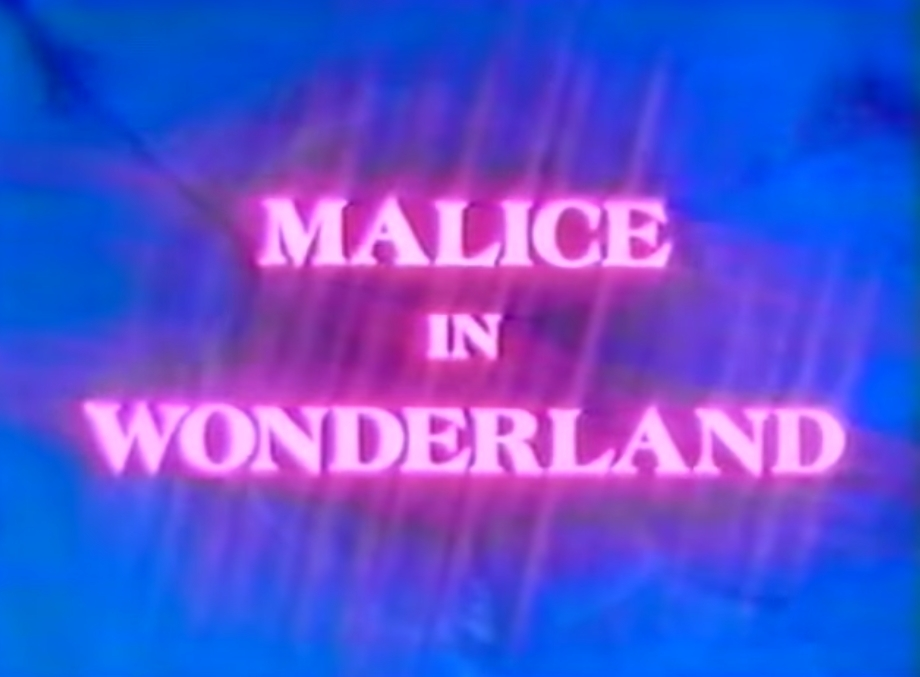
- Directed by: Vince Collins
- Written by: Vince Collins
- Based on: Alice's Adventures in Wonderland by Lewis Carroll
- Produced by: Vince Collins
- Cinematography: Vince Collins
- Edited by: Vince Collins
- Release date: 1982
- Running time: 4 minutes
- Country: United States
- Language: English

Malice in Wonderland is a 1982 American experimental short film based on the 1865 novel Alice's Adventures in Wonderland by Lewis Carroll. It tells the story of Alice's journey in Wonderland through a series of psychedelic hallucinogenic animations of the novel's major characters featuring animated nudity, various character morphing, and a distorted soundscape. The film is considered Vince Collins' best known work.

== Crew ==
- Vince Collins: Director, Film editing, Animation
- Miwako: Graphic design

== Home media ==
Malice in Wonderland was included on the compilation Region 1 DVD General Chaos: Uncensored Animation released on February 6, 1998.

== Reception ==
Following its initial 1982 release, Malice in Wonderland caused controversy for its surreal sexual imagery. However, it had later gained a broader cult popularity by 2009 thanks to video sharing websites such as YouTube.
