= 200 (film) =

1975 short film by Vincent Collins

200 (1975)

200 is a 1975 animated short film directed by Vince Collins, made in honor of the then-upcoming United States Bicentennial.

== Summary ==
The film is a psychedelic short impressionistic history of the United States through its famous symbols amidst its 200th anniversary tribute.

== Production ==
It was funded by the Young Filmmaker Bicentennial Project Grant, launched in October 1974, as one of the seven films distributed, sponsored and produced by USIA (the other six being An American Tune, Winter Count, Came to Here From Over There, Homespun, The Strangers and Apache Bill), who were so impressed by the film's animation that they ordered prints of his other films, including the Student Academy Award-winning short Euphoria. Its soundtrack is the stock instrumental "So Much Alive" from the music library Valentino.

== See also ==
- Experimental animation
- Independent animation
- Americana
