= Lasting Marks =

2018 essay film by Charlie Shackleton

Lasting Marks is a 2018 essay film by Charlie Shackleton.

== Summary ==
Published by The Guardian and narrated by Roland Jaggard, the film focuses on the British police's investigation into same-sex male sadomasochism in the 1980s.

== Production ==
Lasting Marks was a co-production with Academy Award-winning documentarian Laura Poitras's company Field of Vision, and based on Shackleton's own archival research.

== See also ==
- When AIDS Was Funny – similar in content
- Still image film
- Video essay
