= Lee Mishkin =

American animator and director

- Born: February 5, 1927
- Died: June 19, 2001 (aged 74); Seattle, Washington, U.S.
- Occupations: Animator & Director
- Years active: 1949–1991
- Notable work: Is It Always Right to Be Right?

Lee Mishkin (February 5, 1927 – June 19, 2001) was an American animator and director. He directed the short animated film Is It Always Right to Be Right?, which won the Academy Award for Best Animated Short Film in 1970. He was the founder of the Vancouver Institute of Media Arts (VanArts), an art school focusing on animation, design, acting and photography. During the 1980s and 1990s Mishkin served on the advisory board of the National Student Film Institute. On June 19, 2001, Mishkin died in his sleep of heart failure.

== Filmography ==
Year	Title	Notes
1960	King Leonardo and His Short Subjects	Layout Artist
1961-1962	Calvin and the Colonel	Visual Adaptation - 12 episodes
1962	Mister Magoo's Christmas Carol	Production Designer
1964-1965	The Famous Adventures of Mr. Magoo	Character Designer - 7 episodes
1965	The New Three Stooges	Layout Artist - 49 episodes
1966	The Super 6	Writer
1970	Why We Have Taxes, or The Town That Had No Policeman (short)	Director
1970	Why People Have Laws, or Shiver, Gobble & Snore (short)	Director
1970	How the First Letter Was Written (short)	Director
1970	How the Elephant Got His Trunk (short)	Director
1970	Is It Always Right to Be Right? (short)	Director
1974	Butterfly Ball	Director
1977	Halloween Is Grinch Night	Animator
1978	Yogi's Space Race	Animator
1979	The Little Rascals Christmas Special	Animator
1981	Faeries	Producer; Writer; Director; Animator
1987	Bionic Six	Director
1987	Sparky's Magic Piano	Director
1990	Jetsons: The Movie	Animator
