= Vince Collins =

American film director and animator

- Born: January 1, 1944 (age 82)
- Occupations: Animator, film director
- Years active: 1973–present

Vince Collins (aka Vincent Collins) is an American film director and animator. He is best known for directing the 1982 animated short film Malice in Wonderland, as well as other experimental and psychedelic animations.

== Animation career ==
Collins' work began getting noticed with his style of hand-drawn animation. As times changed, he started creating 3D animations. In 1975, the short film Euphoria won him the Student Academy Award. Malice in Wonderland, based on Lewis Carroll's Alice in Wonderland, is one of Collins' most popular works. The short film has been described as hallucinogenic. Collins did not find success in Hollywood.

== Recognition ==
Malice in Wonderland by Collins was considered to be showcased at the 25th Animafest Zagreb event held in 2015.

== Filmography ==
200 (1975)

- Gilgamish (1973)
- Euphoria (1974)
- 200 (1975)
- Fantasy (1976)
- 200 (1976), produced for the US Information Agency
- Animation (1979)
- Malice in Wonderland (1982)
- Life Is Flashing Before Your Eyes (1984)
- General Chaos: Uncensored Animation (1998) (Contains his short film Malice in Wonderland)
- Unofficial Reality (2005)
- Instant Clown Party (2013)
- Animation School Dropout (2014)
- Subliminal Mind Circus (2018)
