= Video (disambiguation) =

Video is an electronic medium for the recording, copying, and broadcasting of moving visual images.

Video may also refer to:

== Arts and entertainment ==
=== Music ===
- Music video, a short film integrating a song and imagery, produced for promotional or artistic purposes

==== Albums ====
- Video (2 Plus 1 album) or the title song, 1985
- Video, by Pakito, 2006
- The Video, a video album by All Saints, 1998
- The Video, a video album by the Sugarcubes, 1991

==== Songs ====
- "Video" (song), by India.Arie, 2001
- "Video!", by Jeff Lynne, 1984
- "Video", by Ben Folds Five from Ben Folds Five, 1995
- "Video", by Davido from Omo Baba Olowo, 2012
- "Video", by Jane Remover from Census Designated, 2023

=== Other media ===
- Video (magazine), a 1977–1999 American consumer electronics magazine
- Video Business, a former trade magazine
- Video art, use of video as an artistic medium
- Video clip (disambiguation)

== Technology ==
- Component video, a video signal that has been split into component channels, often referring to a three-channel analogue standard
- Composite video, a single-channel video signal
- Analog video, video encoded as analog waveforms
- Digital video, video encoded as digital data
- Home video, video media sold, rented or streamed for home entertainment
- HTML video, identified by the <video> tag
- List of video connectors
- S-Video, add two-channel video signal

== See also ==
- Fideo (disambiguation)
- VISTA Deep Extragalactic Observations Survey
