= Video clip =

Video clip may refer to:

- Short videos, especially short-form content
  - Video clip (online media), a short snippet of a video uploaded on the internet
- A music video
- Video Clip, a 2007 Thai horror film

== See also ==
- Media clip
- video (disambiguation)
