= Still image film =

Film technique

A still image film, also called a picture movie, is a film that consists primarily or entirely of still images rather than consecutive still images in succession, forgoing the illusion of motion either for aesthetic or practical reasons. These films usually include a standard soundtrack, similar to what is found in typical sound films, complete with music, sound effects, dialogue or narration. They may also use various editing techniques found in traditional films, such as dissolves, zooms, and panning.

== History ==
This filmmaking technique is more common in historical documentaries, where old photographs may provide the best documentation of certain events. Ken Burns is well known for having used it repeatedly in his films in the last decades. But it was also common before as highlighted in a 1961 letter to The New York Times, where Louis Clyde Stoumen surveyed earlier uses of the technique by him and other documentary filmmakers. Stoumen mentions the German Curt Oertel and his ‘Michelangelo’(1938) (later re-edited into Robert Flaherty’s ‘The Titan’ around 1949); the Belgians Henri Storck and his lyric ‘World of Paul Delvaux’ (1947) and Paul Haesaerts and his ‘Rubens’(1948); the Americans Paul Falkenberg & Lewis Jacobs and their ‘Lincoln Speaks at Gettysburg’(1950) made entirely out of nineteenth-century engravings; the also Americans Berg & Block and their documentary ‘Goya’ (1954) made out of paintings and prints. Stoumen said to have been developing this form for more than a decade.

This still image film technique is less common in narrative films, but has been done occasionally. Such films are typically considered experimental or art films. Perhaps the best known narrative still image film is Chris Marker's 1962 film La Jetée, which was the inspiration for the 1995 film 12 Monkeys. In narrative filmmaking, the vast majority of still image films are short films. Many student films are still image films, and the making of these films is a requirement in some film school courses. George Lucas's first film, the short Look at Life, was made up of only still images heavily influenced by films from Arthur Lipsett like his Oscar-nominated Very Nice, Very Nice. Robert Downey Sr.'s 1966 feature film Chafed Elbows is constructed primarily from still photographs, with a few live-action sequences. Additionally, the 2007 Mexican film Year of the Nail is made up entirely of photographs taken by the director, Jonás Cuarón, over the course of one year. It is perhaps the only feature-length narrative film consisting exclusively of still images. However, many narrative films still employ this technique for individual scenes. Some notable examples are John Cassavetes's Husbands (1970), Gordon Parks Jr.'s Super Fly (1972), Alan J. Pakula's The Parallax View (1974), Tom Tykwer's Run Lola Run (1998), and Apichatpong Weerasethakul's Uncle Boonmee Who Can Recall His Past Lives (2010).

== Style ==
Filmmakers working with still images may do so out of necessity, such as when resources are limited and they are only able to shoot still photographs, rather than moving pictures. However, it is also sometimes chosen for stylistic reasons, and can allow the filmmakers to do things that would be impossible with traditional moving pictures. In Chafed Elbows, for example, the filmmakers had the freedom to improvise their lines during post-production. Additionally, the use of still images made possible a scene in which one character appears to throw another out of a high window, while the actors remained safe. Additionally, in Year of the Nail, the director pieced together unstaged photographs from his real life and was able to build a fictional story from these. Furthermore, still image films may decrease the filmmakers' limitations, as dialogue and sound effects need not be synchronized with moving images.

Ken Burns has credited documentary filmmaker Jerome Liebling for teaching him how still photographs could be incorporated into documentary films. He has also cited the 1957 National Film Board of Canada documentary City of Gold, co-directed by Colin Low and Wolf Koenig, as a prior example of the technique. Winner of the Prix du Documentaire at the Cannes Film Festival and nominated for an Academy Award, City of Gold used animation camera techniques to slowly pan and zoom across archival still pictures of Canada's Klondike Gold Rush.

== Perception ==
As most audiences are unaccustomed to still image films, many viewers are initially turned off by them, but Jonás Cuarón said that people adjust to the style after about seven minutes, as long as the story is engaging. There is some debate about whether or not still image films should in fact be considered as genuine motion pictures, since they do not in fact employ the illusion of motion, with some considering them more akin to the slideshow.

The terms photomontage and collage have also been used to describe still image films, although those words actually refers to entirely different things.

== Notable non-fiction examples ==
- The Naked Eye (1956)
- The True Story of the Civil War (1956)
- City of Gold (1957)
- Salut les cubains (1963)
- Si j'avais quatre dromadaires (1966)
- Case Study: LSD (1969)
- One Second in Montreal (1969)
- From These Roots (1974)
- Eadweard Muybridge, Zoopraxographer (1975)
- 3000 Killed (2017)
- Lasting Marks (2018)
- Caricaturana (2021)
- Still Film (2023)
- Being John Smith (2024)

== Notable fiction examples ==
- Very Nice, Very Nice (1961)
- La Jetée (1962)
- Look at Life (1965)
- Chafed Elbows (1966)
- Santa's Christmas Elf (Named Calvin) (1971)
- Dog's Dialogue (1977)
- Das Clown (1999)
- Some Photos in the City of Sylvia (2007)
- Year of the Nail (2007)
- The Glass Fortress (2016)

== Notable still image filmmakers ==
- Agnes Varda
- Arthur Lipsett
- Santiago Alvarez
- William Greaves
- Thom Andersen
- William E. Jones
- Ken Burns
- Colin Low
- Jonás Cuarón
- Robert Downey Sr.
- Chris Marker
- George Lucas
- Michael Snow

== See also ==
- Ken Burns effect
- One-shot film
- Found footage film
  - Found footage
- Collage film
- Video essay
