= Fantoma Films =

American film distributor

- Industry: Film distribution
- Founders: James Healey, Ian Hendrie and Derrick Scocchera
- Headquarters: San Francisco, California

Fantoma Films is a San Francisco, California based film distributor specializing in "eclectic" cult films and ephemeral films such as educational short films. Fantoma has re-released works by Fritz Lang, Wim Wenders, Kenneth Anger, Sergio Corbucci, Yasuzo Masumura, and others.
