= Fideo =

Fideo may refer to:

== Food ==
- Fideo, the Spanish word for noodle
  - Sopa de fideo, noodle soup used in Spanish, Mexican, Tex-Mex, and Latin Caribbean cuisine.

== People ==
- Samu Castillejo, nicknamed El Fideo, a Spanish professional footballer
- Ángel Di María, nicknamed Fideo, an Argentine professional footballer

== Places ==
- Fideo, Syria

== Arts, entertainment, and media ==
- Fideo, a character from the film Once Upon a Time in Mexico
- Fideo 9 (also Video 9), a Welsh language television programme broadcast on Sianel 4 Cymru (S4C) from 1988 to 1992
- Fideo Ardena, a character from the series Inazuma Eleven

== See also ==
- Fideuà
- Video
