= The Jungle (1967 film) =

- Directed by: Charlie "Brown" Davis; Jimmy "Country" Robinson; David "Bat" Williams
- Release date: 1967
- Running time: 22 minutes

The Jungle is a 1967 short film about gangs made by African American students under the direction of Temple University professor Harold Haskins.

== Production ==
It was written, shot, acted, recorded and edited entirely by African American teenage gang members Charlie "Brown" Davis, Jimmy "Country" Robinson, David "Bat" Williams in Northern Philadelphia, PA.

== Legacy ==
In 2009, it was selected for preservation in the National Film Registry by the Library of Congress as being "culturally, historically or aesthetically significant".

== See also ==
- The Cool World-1963 film by Shirley Clarke also on the Film Registry
- Gang culture
