= 3rd Ave. El (film) =

1955 film

- Directed by: Carson Davidson
- Written by: Carson Davidson
- Produced by: Carson Davidson; Helena Sand
- Starring: Robert Fleury; Joseph Tul; Osmond Beckwith
- Music by: Joseph Haydn, performed by Wanda Landowska
- Distributed by: Ardee Films
- Release date: 1955
- Running time: 11 minutes
- Country: United States
- Language: English

3rd Ave. El is an American short film made by Carson Davidson in 1955. The film presents four vignettes of passengers riding the Third Avenue elevated railway in New York City, made shortly before the line closed in 1955. The film was nominated for an Academy Award for Best Live Action Short Film.

== Release and reception ==
3rd Ave. El was nominated for the Academy Award for Best Live Action Short Film at the 28th Academy Awards.

== Music ==
The film's score is a recording of Haydn's Concerto in D for Harpsichord, performed by Wanda Landowska.

== Preservation ==
The film was preserved by the Academy Film Archive in 2010.
