= Moon Breath Beat =

1980 animated film

Moon Breath Beat is a 1980 animated experimental student film by Lisze Bechtold about her cats turning into abstract figures.

== Production ==
The film was made while Bechtold was a student at California Institute of the Arts. Her instructor, Jules Engel, asked the class to make a film answering the question, "What happens when an animator follows a line, a patch of color, or a shape into the unconscious? What wild images would emerge?"

== Reception and legacy ==
Lisze Bechtold later went on to do visual effects on FernGully: The Last Rainforest (1992) and The Prince and the Pauper (1990). She collaborated on My Film, My Film, My Film (1983), which is in the collection of MoMA, New York. She also writes children's books including the Buster the Very Shy Dog series and Toots the Cat.

In 2014, Moon Breath Beat was selected for preservation in the United States National Film Registry, deemed as "culturally, historically, or aesthetically significant". The film was preserved by the Academy Film Archive in 2016.

It has been described as "full of color, creepiness and unforgettable imagery".

== See also ==
- Furies - Sara Petty's 1977 animated short film similar in content
