= Is It Always Right to Be Right? =

1970 animated film by Lee Mishkin

Is It Always Right to Be Right? is a 1970 American short animated film directed by Lee Mishkin, produced by Stephen Bosustow Productions, and narrated by Orson Welles.

== Origins ==
Dr. Warren H. Schmidt (who died in 2016 at the age of 95) wrote the parable that was the basis of the film and was published by the Los Angeles Times on November 9, 1969. It earned praise from both the political right (Spiro Agnew) and left (Ted Kennedy).

== Plot summary ==
In an unnamed land thought to be the United States, two opposing sides battle to be right in their own political views.

== Accolades ==
It won the Academy Award for Best Animated Short Film in 1970, the last to do so under its previous name "Short Subjects (Cartoons)".
