= Carson Davidson =

American filmmaker, writer, and editor

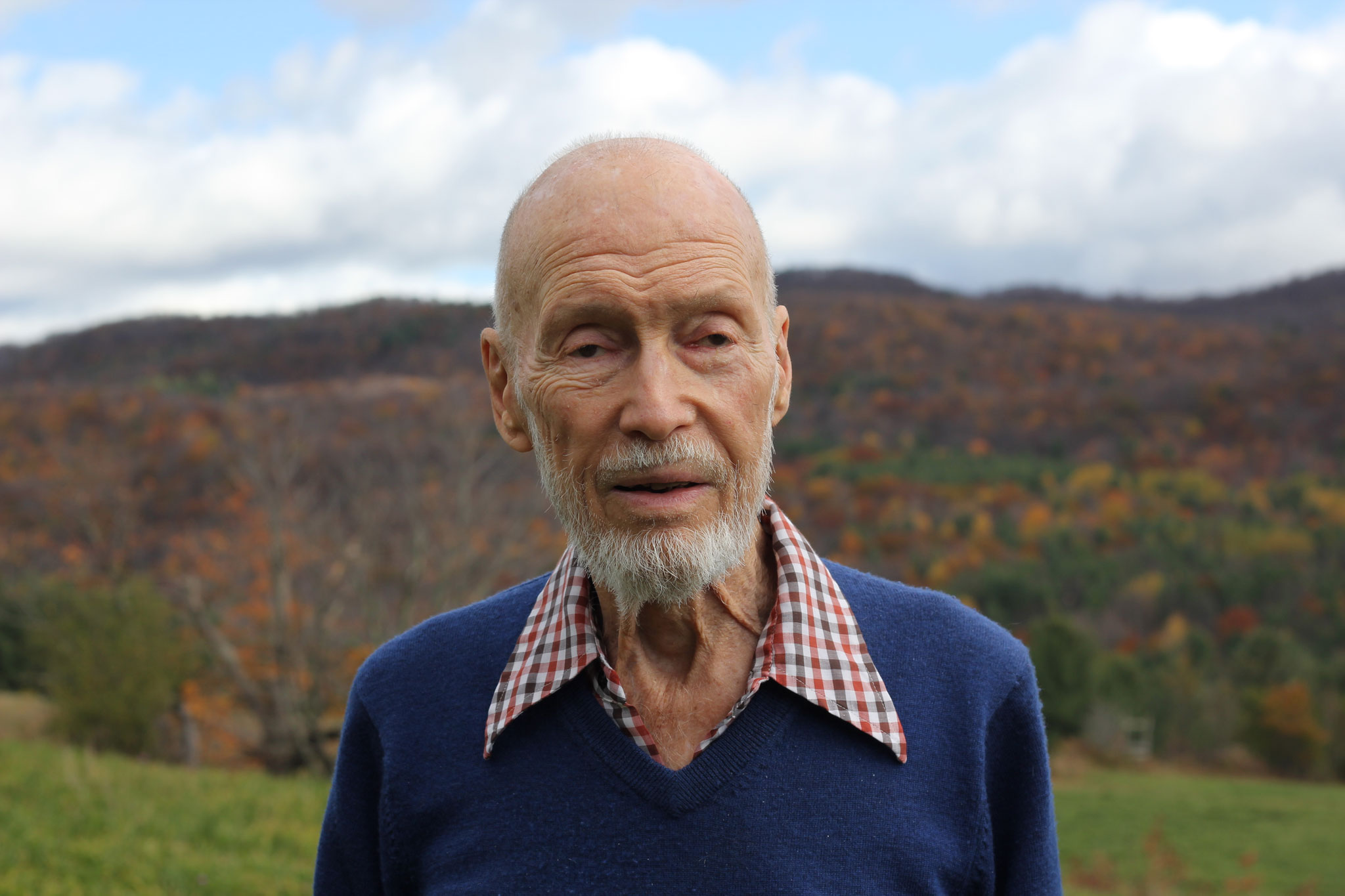
Carson Davidson in the Taconic Mountains Ramble, 2013

Carson "Kit" Davidson (June 24, 1924 – September 29, 2016) was an American filmmaker, writer, and editor. His filmmaking career spanned four decades, during which he made more than a dozen short films, two of which were nominated for Academy Awards.

== Biography ==
Davidson was born in Washington, D.C., attended Antioch College, and served as a blood analysis technician during World War II. While working at Dynamic Films, Inc. in the early 1950s, he began working on his own films, including 3rd Ave. El (1955) and Help! My Snowman's Burning Down (1964), both of which were nominated for Academy Awards for Live Action Short Film. Davidson made two other films focused on railways, Railway with a Heart of Gold (1965) and Brake Free (1970), while also working as a filmmaker for hire for a companies including Alitalia, the Tobin Packing Company, and Duro-Test. After thirty years in filmmaking, Davidson became an editor of medical texts. In 1966, Davidson and his wife, the children's book author Margaret "Mickie" Davidson, purchased 420 acres of land in Vermont, which became the Taconic Mountains Ramble, a Vermont State Park, after Davidson's death in 2016.

== Filmography ==
- Three Hymns Played on the Carillon at Riverside Church (1952)
- Pepperbird Land (1952), a short film about Liberia sponsored by the Government of Liberia, narrated by Sidney Poitier, and shot by photographer Griff Davis.
- Ink and Rice Paper (1954), a short film about woodblock printer Lowell Naeve, later re-edited and re-released as Woodblock Printer.
- 3rd Ave. El (1955), Academy Award-nominated short film about the Third Avenue elevated train in New York City.
- Variations on an Italian Theme (1961), a short travelogue about Italy sponsored and distributed by Alitalia, featuring the music of Vivaldi, concerti including selections from both his Four Seasons and The Contest Between Harmony and Invention performed by I Musici, featuring soloist Felix Ayo.
- The Inspector's Badge (1960), a sponsored film about the Rochester division of the Tobin Packing Company.
- The First Prize Story (1960), an award-winning sponsored film about the Albany division of the Tobin Packing Company
- Help! My Snowman's Burning Down (1964), an absurdist short film shot on a pier in New York Harbor, starring Bob Larkin, with music by Gerry Mulligan, nominated for an Academy Award for Best Live Action Short Film.
- Railway with a Heart of Gold (1965), a short film about the Talyllyn Railway, a narrow gauge heritage railway in Tywyn, Wales, with music composed by Judd Woldin.
- Poppycock! (1966), a narrative short about two men (nameless characters credited as "the bearded one" and "the tall one") in a romantic rivalry over a woman ("the pretty one"), set in New York City, and with music composed by Judd Woldin.
- Woodblock Printer (1968), a look at the process of woodblock printing and the work of printer, illustrator, and writer Lowell Naeve.
- Brake Free (1970), a narrative short depicting the Mount Washington Cog Railway, set to music from Beethoven's third and seventh symphonies.
- The Wrong Damn Film (1975), a feature film starring Barry Bostwick (in his film debut), Barbara Dana, and Keene Curtis.
- Sigmoidoscopy in the Physician's Office (1975?)
- 100 Watts 120 Volts (1977), a short film depicting the manufacture of incandescent light bulbs, filmed at the Duro-Test Corporation and set to Bach's Brandenburg Concerto No. 3.
- The Light Bulb Re-invented (1980), a sponsored film about the development and manufacture of Duro-Test Mi-T-Wattsaver light bulb.
- Granite (1980), a short film about granite quarrying, filmed at the Rock of Ages quarries in Barre, Vermont, set to Saint-Saëns' Symphony No.3.
- 40,000 Acres, with View (1984), a film presented by the New York City Audubon Society about the parks of New York City, filmed across the city's five boroughs, set to Mozart's oboe concerto.

== Books ==
Davidson wrote one children's book, Fast-Talking Dolphin (1978), and co-wrote three in the "Make-Believe It's You" series with his wife Margaret, The Adventures of Puss in Boots Starring You (1987), The Adventures of Snow White and the Seven Dwarfs Starring You (1987), and The Adventures of Thumbelina Starring You (1987).

== Preservation ==
Eleven of Davidson's films, including both films nominated for an Academy Award, were preserved from original film elements by the Academy Film Archive between 2009 and 2013. In addition to the collection of film prints and negatives at the Academy Film Archive, the New York Public Library's Reserve Film and Video Collection holds an extensive collection of Davidson's films on 16mm. Prints of Davidson's films are also included in the collections of the Library of Congress and Pratt Institute Libraries.
