= Chafed Elbows =

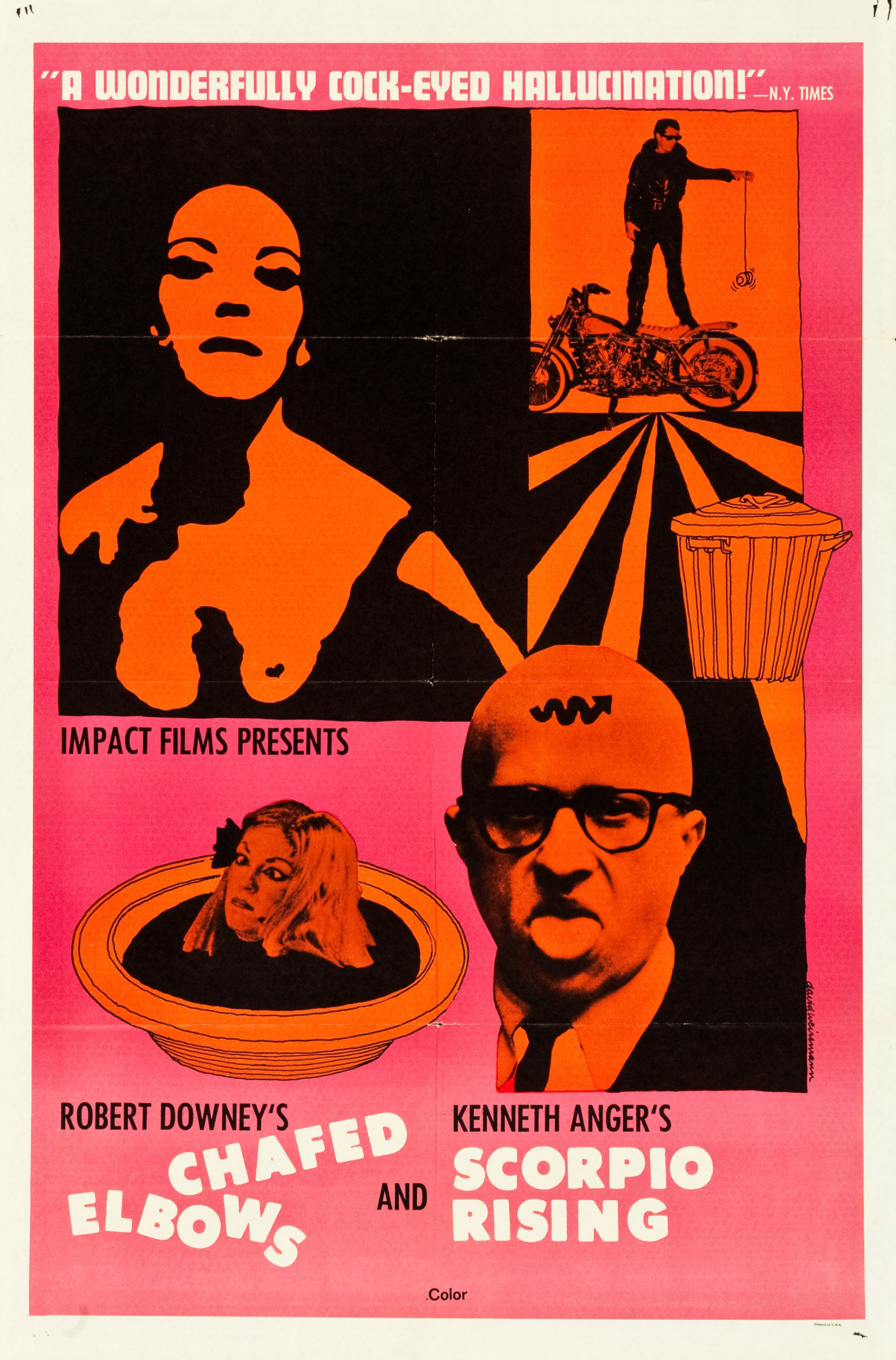
- Poster for a double-billed screening with Scorpio Rising
- Directed by: Robert Downey Sr.
- Written by: Robert Downey Sr.
- Produced by: Robert Downey Sr.
- Cinematography: Stanley Warnow
- Edited by: Robert Soukis; Fred von Bernewitz
- Release date: 1966
- Running time: 63 minutes
- Country: United States
- Budget: $12,000

Chafed Elbows is a 1966 American still image underground film directed, written and produced by Robert Downey Sr.

== Cast ==
- George Morgan as Walter Dinsmore
- Elsie Downey as girls
- Lawrence Wolf as Baldy / 34 voices

== Plot ==
Hapless Walter Dinsmore undergoes his annual November breakdown at the 1964 New York World's Fair, has a love affair with his mother, recollects his mistaken "hysterectomy operation", impersonates a cop, is sold as a piece of living art, goes to heaven, and becomes the singer in a rock band, but not necessarily in that order.

== Production ==
Downey photographed most of the movie with a still 35mm camera and had the film processed at Walgreens drugstore. These pictures were animated alongside a few live-action scenes and almost all of the dialogue was dubbed.

The film was made for $12,000,

One scene was shot in Anthology Film Archives’s upstairs theater back in the days when the building was still a defunct downtown courthouse.

All 13 of the female roles were played by Elsie Downey, Robert Downey's wife, and the lead male role by George Morgan.

== Release ==
The film was premiered at The Gate Theater in New York City and ran for over one month alongside Scorpio Rising (1963).

== Reception ==
Chafed Elbows was a commercial success.

Bosley Crowther wrote in the New York Times: "Everybody in this wacky movie about a busy day in the life of a hyperthyroid moron is an unregenerate mess – from the fellow himself, whose mad adventures include a mistaken hysterectomy, which results in the removal from his: innards of 189 $10 bills, to his snaggletoothed, scratchy-voiced mother with whom he is having an incestuous affair, to his bald headed, viper tongued psychiatrist who rattles off his words like Groucho Marx. They're all hideous, obscene, repulsive people on the order of some of the slobs in comic strips, only these are much more irreverent and filthy-mouthed than any comlc-strip characters would dare to be. And I would hastily overlook them and drop this film with much of the trash in the underground, if it weren't that there is in Chafed Elbows a promising modicum of lively, acid wit."

Boxoffice wrote: "One of the many pictures shot in New Yok each year using a hand-held camera and semi-professional actors, this is strictly a novelty, produced, written and directed by Robert Downey, and suited only to showings for experimental groups or in small Greenwich Village-type houses in the larger key cities. Although the photography is poor with jumpy camerawork which tires the eyes, the picture has several excruciatingly funny moments of clever satire, as well as startlingly frank sex innterludes, vulgarisms and four-letter words. ... At least, the picture rates an "A" for effort."

Critic Parker Tyler described the film as "the offbeat of the offbeat, being a scrupulously coarse and inept, wildly far-out lampoon on honest Underground coarseness, boldness, and ineptitude. Where Ron Rice is relatively naive, Robert Downey is relatively sophisticated, but with the supposed dividends of value reversed. Chafed Elbows is – though the expression is almost tautological – an Underground burlesque. I should say it is quite impossible that an Underground film which Bosley Crowther, Judith Crist, Archer Winsten, and Cue all saw fit to praise could rightly belong to the bona fide Underground. The film's effort at style is significant: it tries to out-kindergarten the kindergarten's view of the adult world."

== Home media ==
It was released on the DVD "Eclipse Series 33: Up All Night with Robert Downey Sr." as part of The Criterion Collection.

== See also ==
- List of American films of 1966
- Still image film
