= Frank Mouris =

American animator

- Born: Francis Peter Mouris; September 6, 1944 (age 82); Key West, Florida, U.S.
- Education: Harvard College; Yale School of Art; American Film Institute
- Occupation: Animator
- Years active: 1967–2006
- Spouse: Caroline Mouris (m. 1966)

Francis Peter "Frank" Mouris (born September 6, 1944) is an American animator. He is best known for his film Frank Film (1973), for which he won an Academy Award for Best Animated Short Film.

== Career ==
Other films he made alongside wife Caroline include Coney (1975), Impasse (1978), the live action feature Beginner's Luck (1986) and Frankly Caroline (1999). He also contributed animations to Sesame Street.

== Legacy ==
Frank Film was added to the National Film Registry in 1996.

Original picture and sound negatives, as well as preservation negatives on a number of the Mourises' films, are held at the Academy Film Archive and at the Yale Film Archive in New Haven.

Frank Film was also preserved by the Academy Film Archive.

== See also ==
- Experimental animation
- Collage animation
- Independent animation
