= Furies (1977 film) =

1977 American animated short film

- Directed by: Sara Petty
- Music by: Ned Rorem
- Release date: 1977
- Running time: 3 minutes
- Country: United States
- Language: English

Furies is a 1977 American experimental animated short film by Sara Petty.

== Style ==
Writing for Animation for Adults, blogger Yvonne G. describes the film as "a gorgeous rush" in which

The environment is an abstract painting in motion inhabited by two graceful and delicate felines. The film seems to shift into the cats’ perspective as tunnels and stairs fly by. At the end of the abstract path you land back at the window. Perspective expands and you feel like you’ve been ported into a and out of a mind that sees only shape.

rarefilm notes that its charcoal- and pastel-drawn designs evoke Art Deco and Cubism.

== Reception and legacy ==
Despite the film's acclaim, few prints are known to exist. In 2017, it was screened at New York City's Metrograph Theater––alongside such shorts as Lisze Bechtold's conceptually similar Moon Breath Beat––as part of its "Restored Animated Rarities" program hosted by the Academy of Motion Picture Arts and Sciences. The following year, the Los Angeles-based iotaCenter uploaded a copy to its Vimeo page.

It is one of only a handful of independently produced shorts named in The 50 Greatest Cartoons, where it (mislabeled The Furies, misdated to 1976, and misattributed to Sarah Petty) appears among "Other Great Cartoons" that did not qualify for the main list but had nonetheless received "a substantial number of votes". The Simpsons creator Matt Groening has named it among his favorite animated films, praising the "skill and patience" of its work.

== Accolades ==
It was named Best Film Under Three Minutes at the 1978 Ottawa International Animation Festival and received first-place honors at an additional 13 festivals.

== See also ==
- Moon Breath Beat - the aforementioned 1980 animated short film similar in content
