= Time Piece =

1965 film by Jim Henson

- Directed by: Jim Henson
- Written by: Jim Henson
- Produced by: Jim Henson
- Starring: Jim Henson; Enid Cafritz; Frank Oz; Jerry Juhl
- Cinematography: Ted Nemeth
- Music by: Don Sebesky
- Production company: Muppets, Inc.
- Distributed by: Pathé Contemporary Films
- Release date: 1965
- Running time: 9 minutes
- Country: United States
- Language: English

Time Piece is a 1965 American independent experimental short film directed, written, produced by and starring Jim Henson. The film depicts an ordinary man living in constant motion, in a desperate attempt to escape the passage of time. Time Piece is notable as one of the few live-action projects Jim Henson produced that did not involve any form of puppetry. The short film was nominated for an Academy Award for Best Live Action Short Film in 1966.

== Plot ==
The fast-paced scenes in Time Piece are edited together in a rhythmic pentameter, with an underlying use of sounds and repetitive beats. The film begins with a young man (whose only line, repeated four times, is "Help!") sitting patiently in a hospital bed. An unidentified doctor enters the room and checks the man's heart rate, which begins to pulse rhythmically.

As the rhythm increases, the film begins to follow the man's daily habits such as crossing a busy street, in different clothes and different locations, working in a busy office, working on a conveyor belt, walking through different locations and ending up in a forest where he has the appearance of Tarzan, eating dinner with his wife, walking down the street seeing pogo stick riders, and visiting a strip club while simultaneously maintaining himself in motion.

Eventually, the man is imprisoned for shooting the Mona Lisa while intoxicated (signified by a scene of him painting an elephant pink) and dressed as a cowboy and is forced to perform acts of labor like working in the rock pile. The man eventually escapes from prison and begins to frantically run across a long distance with different disguises like a man in a top hat and Tarzan while evading cowboys. The man then jumps off a diving board and soars into the sky (aided by a flying device) where he is subsequently shot down by the world's military powers. He falls from the sky defeated and lands in a muddy puddle in the form of a rustic clock. The clock strikes twelve and the film's events flash quickly on-screen.

Back in the hospital room, the doctor covers the man's seemingly lifeless body. The camera then pans up towards the doctor's face, revealing him to be the same man smiling gleefully and winking at the camera.

== Cast ==
- Jim Henson - Man, Doctor in facial shots
- Enid Cafritz - Man's Wife
- Jerry Juhl - Bartender
- Frank Oznowicz - Office Messenger Boy, Man in Gorilla Suit, Dead man, doctor, prior to face reveal
- April March - Stripper
- Sandy Patterson -
- Diana Birkenfield -
- Dave Bailey - Drummer
- Dennis Paget -
- Jim Hutchison - Club Dancer
- Barbara Richman - Club Dancer

== Production ==
Unlike most films, Time Piece was not written as a script. Instead, Jim Henson had storyboarded the entire film prior to filming. Between shuffling performances with The Muppets for The Jimmy Dean Show and film commercials, Henson shot the film intermittently from June 1964 to May 1965. Due to this restricted time frame, every shot in the film lasts only one to four seconds. Henson even calculated the amount of frames each shot would contain.

Henson solely produced the film's animation sequences, while Muppet designer Don Sahlin was responsible for the film's visual effects shots.

Legendary Blue Note Records engineer Rudy Van Gelder recorded the music.

== Release ==
Henson premiered Time Piece at the Museum of Modern Art in New York City in 1965. The film also had a lengthy screening run at the Paris Theatre in Manhattan.

Time Piece was released theatrically in the United States with Claude Lelouch's A Man and a Woman. In addition to its Academy Award nomination, the film also won the CINE Eagle Award and the American Film Festival's Blue Ribbon Award, and received recognition at the XII International Short Film Festival Oberhausen.

== See also ==
- List of American films of 1965
- Art film
- Modernist film
