= Help! My Snowman's Burning Down =

- Directed by: Carson Davidson
- Written by: Carson Davidson
- Produced by: Carson Davidson
- Starring: Bob Larkin; Dian Robertson
- Music by: Gerry Mulligan
- Release date: 1964
- Running time: 10 minutes
- Country: United States
- Language: English

Help! My Snowman's Burning Down is an American short film made by Carson Davidson in 1964, with music composed and performed by Gerry Mulligan. The film was nominated for an Academy Award for Best Live Action Short Film.

== Release and reception ==
Help! My Snowman's Burning Down was nominated for the Academy Award for Best Live Action Short Film at the 37th Academy Awards. The film screened in competition at the 1964 Cannes Film Festival and was awarded the Short Film Jury Prize, tied with Sillages by Serge Roullet.

== Music ==
Music for the film is credited to Gerry Mulligan on baritone saxophone, with Bob Brookmeyer on valve trombone, Bill Crow on acoustic double bass, and Dave Bailey on drums.

== Preservation ==
The film was preserved by the Academy Film Archive in 2009.
