= Frank Film =

1973 collage film by Frank and Caroline Mouris

- Directed by: Caroline Mouris; Frank Mouris
- Written by: Frank Mouris
- Screenplay by: Tony Schwartz; Frank Mouris
- Produced by: Frank Mouris
- Narrated by: Frank Mouris
- Edited by: Frank Mouris
- Music by: Tony Schwartz
- Production company: Frank Mouris Productions
- Distributed by: Pyramid Films
- Release date: 13 April 1973
- Running time: 9 minutes
- Country: United States
- Language: English

Frank Film is a 1973 American animated short film by Frank Mouris and Caroline Mouris. The film won an Academy Award for Best Animated Short Film and was selected for preservation in the National Film Registry in 1996 by the Library of Congress.

== Summary ==
It is a compilation of images co-creator Frank Mouris had collected from magazines interwoven with two narrations, one giving a mostly linear autobiography and the other stating words having to do with the images, the story the first voice is relating, or neither. Each second voice word or phrase involves an "F". Frank made the film with his wife Caroline Mouris, daughter of mathematician Lars Ahlfors. The soundtrack was conceived and created by Tony Schwartz.

== Reception ==
The movie won the 1974 Academy Award for Best Short Subject Animated Films and the Annecy Cristal at the Annecy International Animated Film Festival alongside praise by film critic Andrew Sarris as the best American film at the New York Film Festival and "a nine minute evocation of America's exhilarating everythingness". Vulture ranked the film #82 on their list of Oscar-winning animated shorts.

== Legacy ==
In 1996, Frank Film was selected for the United States National Film Registry by the Library of Congress as being "culturally, historically, or aesthetically significant". The film was also featured in the 1985 movie titled Explorers. The film was preserved by the Academy Film Archive in 2019.

Frank Film is included on the 2007 DVD five by two: five animated shorts by frank & caroline mouris. It was also included in the Animation Show of Shows.

== See also ==
- List of American films of 1973
- Cutout animation
- Collage film
