= George Griffin (animator) =

American experimental animator

George Griffin (born 1943) is an American experimental animator based in New York.

== Films ==
His best known works are Head (1975), Viewmaster (1978), Lineage (1979), It's An OK Life (1980), Flying Fur (1981) set to the music of cartoon composer Scott Bradley for the Tom and Jerry short Puttin On The Dog, Ko-Ko (1988) set to the music of Charlie Parker and A Little Routine (1994).

A Little Routine is available as part of Animation Show of Shows.

== Television ==
He was line producer for R.O. Blechman's The Soldier's Tale (1984), made commercials for Colossal Pictures and does commissioned works at his own studio called Metropolis Studios.

== See also ==
- Independent animation
- Experimental film
- Film essay
