= Fred Mogubgub =

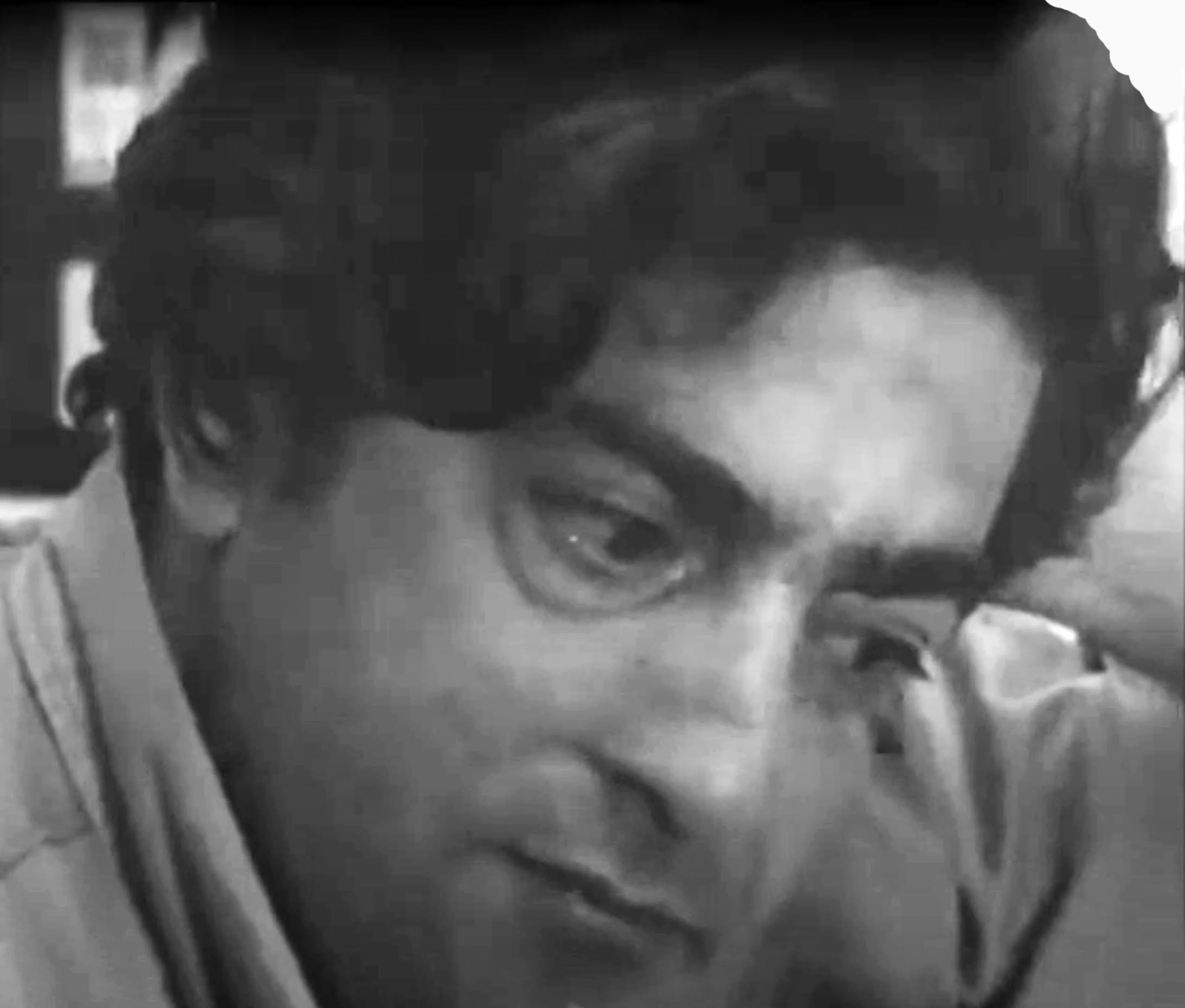
- Born: September 25, 1927
- Died: March 9, 1989 (aged 61)
- Occupations: Animator, painter

Fred Mogubgub (September 25, 1927 – March 9, 1989) was an animator and painter who first came to attention through his films related to the pop art movement of the 1960s in New York City. In 1961 Mogubgub joined designer Pablo Ferro and Lew Schwartz to form Ferro, Mogubgub and Schwartz. In 1964, he left the company to form Mogubgub, Ltd.

== Style ==
Mogubgub's style is quick, staccato, jump-cut—an assemblage of cartoons and photographs that flash across the screen fast enough to be almost subliminal advertising. Among his clients were Ford, Coca-Cola and Life Savers. Mogubgub says he chooses his subject matter from 'American objects which stick out from the clichés you get drilled into you in school.' He was given the slogan "Have you ever heard anyone say 'no' to a Life Saver?" by the Beech-Nut people and made a pop commercial. A follow-up survey reported that the public recalled it more often than straight ads.

== Death ==
Mogubgub died of bone cancer at his home in Cliffside Park, New Jersey, on March 9, 1989, at age 61.

== Commercial work ==
Fred created many animated films, television shows and advertising campaigns, and several of his movies are in the collection of the Museum of Modern Art. He was known in the 1960s for his innovative fast-cut style and such offbeat commercials and films as Enter Hamlet and The Pop Show (latter featuring an unknown Gloria Steinem).

One of Mr. Mogubgub's best-known Pop artworks was a huge sign erected in midtown Manhattan in 1965 that read, Why Doesn't Someone Give Mogubgub Ltd. Two Million Dollars to Make a Movie? His works, ranging in style from abstract to realistic, were exhibited in many New York galleries, and his 25-by-30-foot fantasy, Virginia's Garden, was said to be one of the world's largest paintings.

== Family ==
Mr. Mogubgub is survived by his wife, Virginia, and two sons, Fred Jr. and Sam, all of Cliffside Park, and by two sisters, Lorraine Simmons of Lenoir, N.C., and Dolores Corby of Ocean City, N.J.

== Selected filmography ==
- Enter Hamlet (1965)
- The Pop Show (1966)
- American Pie (1972)
