= Robert Downey Sr. =

American film director, screenwriter, and actor (1936–2021)

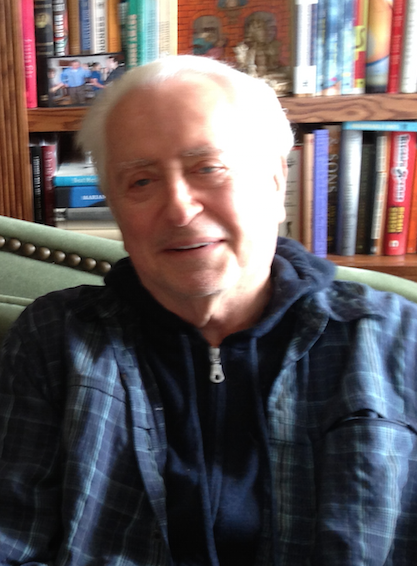
- Downey in 2016
- Born: Robert John Elias Jr. June 24, 1936; New York City, U.S.
- Died: July 7, 2021 (aged 85); New York City, U.S.
- Occupations: Director; writer; actor
- Years active: 1953–2011
- Spouses: Elsie Ann Ford (m. 1962; div. 1975); Laura Ernst (m. 1991; died 1994); Rosemary Rogers (m. 1998)
- Children: 2, including Robert Jr.

Robert John Downey Sr. (né Elias Jr.; June 24, 1936 – July 7, 2021) was an American film director, screenwriter, and actor. He was known for writing and directing the underground films Putney Swope (1969), a satire on the New York Madison Avenue advertising world, and Greaser's Palace (1972), a surrealist Western. According to film scholar Wheeler Winston Dixon, Downey's films during the 1960s were "strictly take-no-prisoners affairs, with minimal budgets and outrageous satire, effectively pushing forward the countercultural agenda of the day." He was the father of actor Robert Downey Jr.

== Early life ==
Robert John Elias Jr. was born in the Manhattan borough of New York City, on June 24, 1936. He was the son of Elizabeth "Betty" McLauchlen, a model and magazine editor, and Robert John Elias Sr., who worked in management of motels and restaurants. His paternal grandparents were Lithuanian Jews, while his mother was of half Hungarian Jewish and half Irish ancestry. He grew up in Rockville Centre, New York. He changed his surname to Downey after his stepfather, when he wanted to enlist in the United States Army while being underage. Downey later said he wrote an unpublished novel during his time in the army, though he spent much of his military career "in the stockade".

== Career ==
Downey initially made his mark creating very low-budget independent films aligning with the absurdist movement, in line with counterculture, anti-establishment, 1960s America. His work in the late 1960s and 1970s was quintessential anti-establishment, reflecting the nonconformity popularized by larger counterculture movements and given impetus by new freedoms in films, such as the breakdown of film censorship codes. In keeping with the underground tradition, his 1970s films were independently made on shoestring budgets and were relatively obscure in the Absurdist movement, finding cult notoriety.

In 1961, working with film editor Fred von Bernewitz, Downey began writing and directing low-budget 16mm films that gained an underground following, beginning with Ball's Bluff (1961), a fantasy short about a Civil War soldier who awakens in Central Park in 1961. He moved into big-budget filmmaking with the surrealistic Greaser's Palace (1972). His last film was Rittenhouse Square (2005), a documentary capturing life in a Philadelphia park.

Downey's films were often family affairs. His first wife appears in four of his films (Chafed Elbows, Pound, Greaser's Palace, Moment to Moment), as well as co-writing one (Moment to Moment). Daughter Allyson and son Robert Downey Jr. each made their film debuts in the 1970 absurdist comedy Pound at the ages of 7 and 5, respectively; Allyson would appear in one more film by her father, Up the Academy. Robert Jr.'s lengthy acting résumé includes appearances in eight films directed by his father (Pound, Greaser's Palace, Moment to Moment, Up the Academy, America, Rented Lips, Too Much Sun, Hugo Pool), as well as two acting appearances in movies where his father was also an actor (Johnny Be Good, Hail Caesar).

Unmade projects include a script written in the 1980s for Hal Ashby to direct, variously referred to under the titles Victor Hiatus and Almost Together, and a film set to be executive produced by Paul Thomas Anderson in the 2000s, Forest Hills Bob.

== Personal life and death ==
Downey was married three times. His first marriage was to actress Elsie Ann Ford (1934–2014) in 1962, with whom he had two children: actress-writer Allyson (b. 1963) and actor Robert Jr. (b. 1965). The marriage ended in divorce in 1975. His second marriage, to actress-writer Laura Ernst, lasted until her death on January 27, 1994, from amyotrophic lateral sclerosis (ALS). In 1998, he married his third wife, Rosemary Rogers, humorist and co-author of Saints Preserve Us! and other books. They lived in New York City. Downey died of complications from Parkinson's disease in his sleep at his home in Manhattan, on July 7, 2021, thirteen days after his 85th birthday.

== Legacy ==
The Criterion Collection released five of his films (the National Film Registry inductee Putney Swope, Babo 73, Chafed Elbows, No More Excuses and Taos Tonight) as part of the Eclipse Series. A 2022 documentary film simply called "Sr." was made by Chris Smith of American Movie fame and was produced by his son. It won the National Board of Review Award for Best Documentary Feature.

== Filmography ==
=== Film ===
==== Filmmaking credits ====
Year	Title	Director	Writer	Producer	Notes	Ref.
1953	The American Road	No	No	No	Short film; cinematographer	
1961	Balls Bluff	Yes	Yes	Yes	Short film; also actor	
1964	A Touch of Greatness	Yes	No	Yes	Documentary film; also cinematographer	
1964	Babo 73	Yes	Yes	Yes		
1965	Sweet Smell of Sex	Yes	Yes	No	Also cinematographer	
1966	Chafed Elbows	Yes	Yes	Yes		
1968	No More Excuses	Yes	Yes	Yes	Also actor	
1969	Putney Swope	Yes	Yes	No	Also uncredited voice dubbing	
1970	Pound	Yes	Yes	No		
1971	Cold Turkey	2nd unit	No	No		
1972	Greaser's Palace	Yes	Yes	No		
1973	Sticks and Bones	Yes	Yes	No	Television film	
1975	Moment to Moment	Yes	Yes	No	a.k.a. Two Tons of Turquoise to Taos Tonight	
1980	Up the Academy	Yes	No	No		
1980	The Gong Show Movie	No	Yes	No		
1986	America	Yes	Yes	No		
1988	Rented Lips	Yes	No	No		
1991	Too Much Sun	Yes	Yes	No		
1997	Hugo Pool	Yes	No	No		
2005	Rittenhouse Square	Yes	No	No	Documentary film	

==== Acting credits ====
Year	Title	Role	Notes	Ref.
1969	Putney Swope	Putney Swope (Voice)	Uncredited, Dubbing Arnold Johnson	
1969	Naughty Nurse	Desk Clerk	Short film	
1971	You've Got to Walk It Like You Talk It or You'll Lose That Beat	Head of Ad Agency		
1971	Is There Sex After Death?	Himself	Mockumentary and mondo film	
1985	To Live and Die in L.A.	Agent Thomas Bateman		
1988	Johnny Be Good	NCAA Investigator Floyd Gondoli		
1994	Hail Caesar	Butler		
1996	The Sunchaser	Telephone Voices		
1997	Boogie Nights	Burt		
1999	Magnolia	WDKK Show Director		
2000	The Family Man	Man in House		
2004	From Other Worlds	Baker		
2011	Tower Heist	Judge Ramos		
2022	"Sr."	Himself	Documentary film	

=== Television ===
Year	Title	Role	Notes	Ref.
1985–1986	The Twilight Zone	Mr. Miller	also directed 3 episodes acted in segment: "Wordplay"	
1987	Matlock	Judge Warren Anderson	Season 2, Episode 3: “The Annihilator”	
1988	Moving Target	Weinberg	Television film	
1988–1989	1st & Ten	Mike McDonald / Reporter #4 / Reporter / Sports Writer	4 episodes	
1993	Tales of the City	Edgar's Doctor	Miniseries; 1 episode	
