= Six O'Clock News =

Six O'Clock News may refer to:

- News at Six (Hong Kong TV programme) (1957–2016), a defunct evening news bulletin on Asia Television in Hong Kong
- RTÉ News: Six One (1962–present), an Irish evening news bulletin on RTÉ One
- BBC News at Six (1984–present), formerly BBC Six O'Clock News, the main evening newscast on BBC One in the United Kingdom
- STV News at Six (2009–present), three separate news programmes on STV in the North, East and West regions of Scotland
- Six O'Clock News (BBC Radio 4), a news programme on BBC Radio 4
- Six O'Clock News (film), a 1996 documentary film by Ross McElwee about television news in the United States
- "Six O'Clock News", a song by John Prine on his eponymous album John Prine

== See also ==
- One O'Clock News (disambiguation)
- Five O'Clock News (disambiguation)
- Nine O'Clock News (disambiguation)
- News at One (disambiguation)
- News at Ten (disambiguation)
