= Boston Society of Film Critics Awards 1980 =

Annual US film awards ceremony

1st Boston Society of Film Critics Awards

March 22, 1981

Best Film:
Raging Bull

The 1st Boston Society of Film Critics Awards honored the best filmmaking of 1980. The awards were given on 22 March 1981.

== Winners ==
- Best Film:
  - Raging Bull
- Best Actor:
  - Robert De Niro – Raging Bull
- Best Actress:
  - Gena Rowlands – Gloria
- Best Supporting Actor:
  - Jason Robards – Melvin and Howard
- Best Supporting Actress:
  - Mary Steenburgen – Melvin and Howard
- Best Director:
  - Roman Polanski – Tess
- Best Screenplay:
  - Bo Goldman – Melvin and Howard
- Best Cinematography:
  - Michael Chapman – Raging Bull
- Best Documentary:
  - Charleen or How Long Has This Been Going On?
- Best Foreign-Language Film:
  - The Last Metro (Le dernier métro) • France
- Best Independent Film:
  - Return of the Secaucus 7
- Best American Film:
  - Melvin and Howard
