= National Society of Film Critics Award for Best Screenplay =

Annual US film award

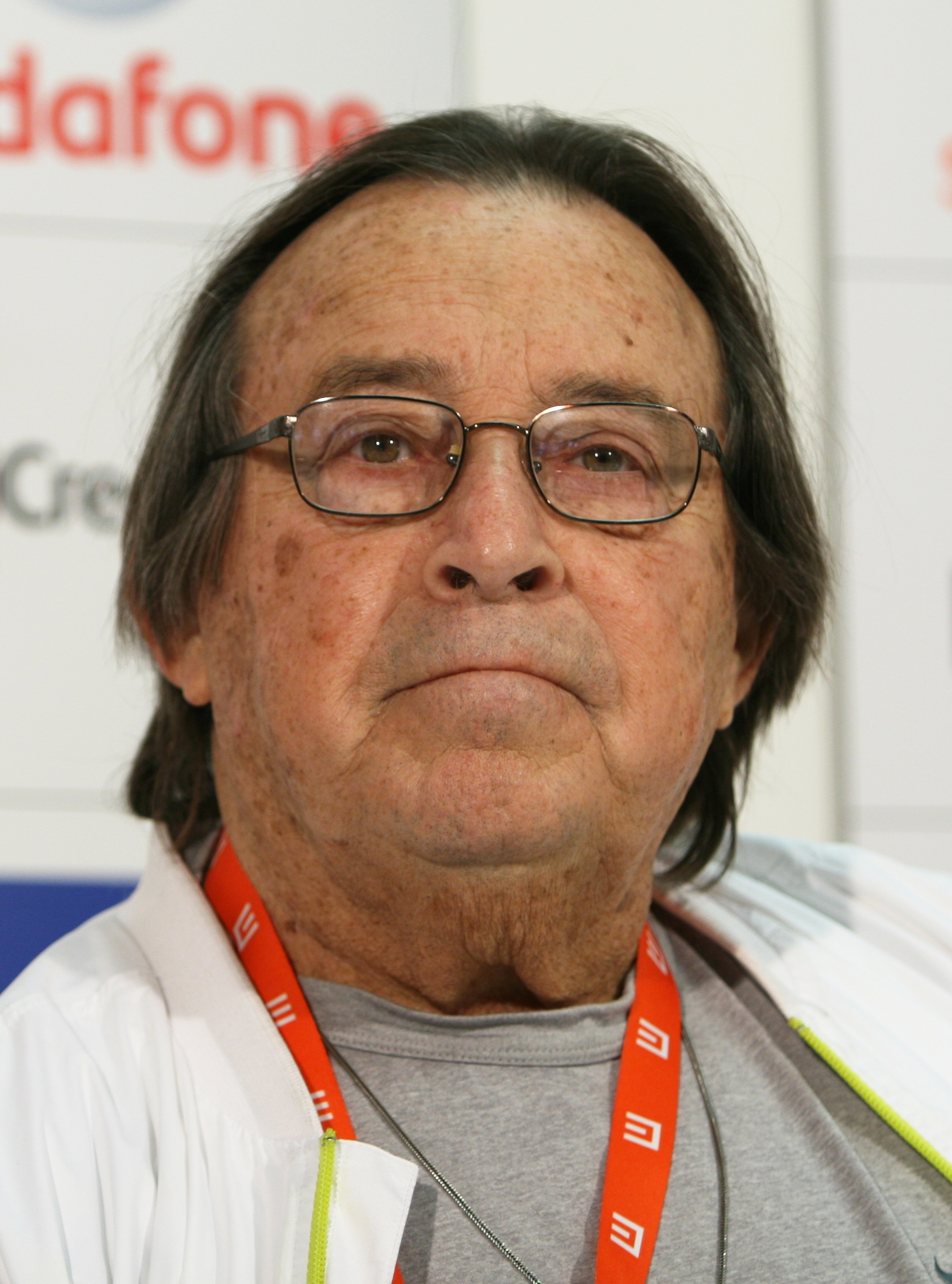
Paul Mazursky at 43rd Karlovy Vary International Film Festival

The National Society of Film Critics Award for Best Screenplay is the award given for best screenwriting at the annual National Society of Film Critics (NSFC) Awards. The category was introduced in 1967, in the 2nd awards ceremony.

== List of winners ==
=== 1960s ===
Year	Screenwriter(s)	Film
1967	David Newman and Robert Benton	Bonnie and Clyde
1968	John Cassavetes	Faces
1969	Paul Mazursky and Larry Tucker	Bob & Carol & Ted & Alice

=== 1970s ===
Year	Screenwriter(s)	Film
1970	Éric Rohmer	My Night at Maud's
1971	Penelope Gilliatt	Sunday Bloody Sunday
1972	Ingmar Bergman	Cries and Whispers
1973	George Lucas, Gloria Katz, and Willard Huyck	American Graffiti
1974	Ingmar Bergman	Scenes from a Marriage
1975	Robert Towne and Warren Beatty	Shampoo
1976	Alain Tanner and John Berger	Jonah Who Will Be 25 in the Year 2000
1977	Woody Allen and Marshall Brickman	Annie Hall
1978	Paul Mazursky	An Unmarried Woman
1979	Steve Tesich	Breaking Away

=== 1980s ===
Year	Screenwriter(s)	Film
1980	Bo Goldman	Melvin and Howard
1981	John Guare	Atlantic City
1982	Murray Schisgal and Larry Gelbart	Tootsie
1983	Bill Forsyth	Local Hero
1984	Lowell Ganz, Babaloo Mandel, and Bruce Jay Friedman	Splash
1985	Albert Brooks and Monica Johnson	Lost in America
1986	Hanif Kureishi	My Beautiful Laundrette
1987	John Boorman	Hope and Glory
1988	Ron Shelton	Bull Durham
1989	Gus Van Sant and Daniel Yost	Drugstore Cowboy

=== 1990s ===
Year	Screenwriter(s)	Film
1990	Charles Burnett	To Sleep with Anger
1991	David Cronenberg	Naked Lunch
1992	David Webb Peoples	Unforgiven
1993	Jane Campion	The Piano
1994	Quentin Tarantino and Roger Avary	Pulp Fiction
1995	Amy Heckerling	Clueless
1996	Albert Brooks and Monica Johnson	Mother
1997	Curtis Hanson and Brian Helgeland	L.A. Confidential
1998	Scott Frank	Out of Sight
1999	Charlie Kaufman	Being John Malkovich

=== 2000s ===
Year	Screenwriter(s)	Film
2000	Kenneth Lonergan	You Can Count on Me
2001	Julian Fellowes	Gosford Park
2002	Ronald Harwood	The Pianist
2003	Shari Springer Berman and Robert Pulcini	American Splendor
2004	Alexander Payne and Jim Taylor	Sideways
2005	Noah Baumbach	The Squid and the Whale
2006	Peter Morgan	The Queen
2007	Tamara Jenkins	The Savages
2008	Mike Leigh	Happy-Go-Lucky
2009	Joel Coen and Ethan Coen	A Serious Man

=== 2010s ===
Year	Screenwriter(s)	Film
2010	Aaron Sorkin	The Social Network
2011	Asghar Farhadi	A Separation
2012	Tony Kushner	Lincoln
2013	Richard Linklater, Ethan Hawke, and Julie Delpy	Before Midnight
2014	Wes Anderson	The Grand Budapest Hotel
2015	Tom McCarthy and Josh Singer	Spotlight
2016	Kenneth Lonergan	Manchester by the Sea
2017	Greta Gerwig	Lady Bird
2018	Armando Iannucci, David Schneider, Ian Martin and Peter Fellows	The Death of Stalin
2019	Bong Joon-ho and Han Jin-won	Parasite

=== 2020s ===
Year	Screenwriter(s)	Film
2020	Eliza Hittman	Never Rarely Sometimes Always
2021	Ryusuke Hamaguchi and Takamasa Oe	Drive My Car
2022	Todd Field	TÁR
2023	Samy Burch	May December
2024	Jesse Eisenberg	A Real Pain
2025	Jafar Panahi	It Was Just an Accident
