= Remake (2025 film) =

2025 American documentary film

- Theatrical release poster
- Directed by: Ross McElwee
- Produced by: Ross McElwee; Mark Meatto
- Cinematography: Ross McElwee; Adrian McElwee
- Edited by: Ross McElwee; Joe Bini
- Production companies: Giant Squid; Impact Partners
- Distributed by: Music Box Films
- Release dates: September 3, 2025 (Venice); July 10, 2026 (United States)
- Running time: 116 minutes
- Country: United States
- Language: English
- Box office: $62,377

Remake is a 2025 American documentary film directed and produced by Ross McElwee. It follows McElwee reevaluating his approach to filmmaking following the death of his son and the effort to adapt his project Sherman's March (1986).

Remake premiered out of competition at the 82nd Venice International Film Festival on September 3, 2025, where it won the Golden Globe Impact Prize for Documentary. It was released on July 10, 2026, by Music Box Films.

== Premise ==
The film follows Ross McElwee reevaluating his approach to filmmaking following the death of his son and the effort to adapt his project Sherman's March (1986).

== Release ==
The film had its world premiere out of competition at the 82nd Venice International Film Festival on September 3, 2025. In April 2026, Music Box Films acquired distribution rights to the film, and set it for a July 10, 2026, release.

== Reception ==
On the review aggregator website Rotten Tomatoes, 98% of 53 critics' reviews are positive, with an average rating of 9.2/10. The website's consensus reads: "All the more devastating for resisting easy sentimentality, Remake is a deeply personal investigation of memory that will resonate with anyone who has lost a loved one." Metacritic, which uses a weighted average, assigned the film a score of 94 out of 100, based on 22 critics, indicating "universal acclaim".

Phil de Semlyen of Time Out gave the film five out of five stars, writing: "Emotionally shattering." Vikram Murthi of IndieWire gave the film an A−, writing: "Remake, like all of McElwee's personal cinema, embody[sic] the passage of time itself. In other words, it's the stuff of life."

=== Accolades ===
The film is nominated for four Critics' Choice Documentary Awards including Best Documentary Feature at the 11th ceremony.
