= Outlaw Country (disambiguation) =

Outlaw country is a subgenre of American country music.

Outlaw Country may also refer to:

- Outlaw Country (SiriusXM), a radio channel
- Outlaw Country (1949 film), an American Western film
- Outlaw Country (2012 film), a television film
- "Outlaw Country" (Legends of Tomorrow), a 2016 episode
