= 1980 National Society of Film Critics Awards =

Annual US film award ceremony

15th NSFC Awards

January 6, 1981

Best Film:
Melvin and Howard

The 15th National Society of Film Critics Awards, given on 6 January 1981, honored the best filmmaking of 1980.

== Winners ==
=== Best Picture ===
1. Melvin and Howard
2. Raging Bull
2. Every Man for Himself (Sauve qui peut (la vie))

=== Best Director ===
1. Martin Scorsese – Raging Bull
2. Jonathan Demme – Melvin and Howard
3. Jean-Luc Godard – Every Man for Himself (Sauve qui peut (la vie))

=== Best Actor ===
1. Peter O'Toole – The Stunt Man
2. Robert De Niro – Raging Bull
3. Robert Duvall – The Great Santini

=== Best Actress ===
1. Sissy Spacek – Coal Miner's Daughter
2. Mary Tyler Moore – Ordinary People
3. Goldie Hawn – Private Benjamin

=== Best Supporting Actor ===
1. Joe Pesci – Raging Bull
2. Timothy Hutton – Ordinary People
3. Jason Robards – Melvin and Howard

=== Best Supporting Actress ===
1. Mary Steenburgen – Melvin and Howard
2. Debra Winger – Urban Cowboy
3. Cathy Moriarty – Raging Bull

=== Best Screenplay ===
1. Bo Goldman – Melvin and Howard
2. John Sayles – Return of the Secaucus 7
3. Jean Gruault – Mon Oncle d'Amérique

=== Best Cinematography ===
1. Michael Chapman – Raging Bull
2. Freddie Francis – The Elephant Man
3. Ghislain Cloquet and Geoffrey Unsworth – Tess
