= Outlaw country (disambiguation) =

Outlaw country is a subgenre of American country music.

Outlaw Country may also refer to:

- Outlaw Country (Sirius XM), a Sirius XM Radio channel devoted to outlaw country music
- Outlaw Country (1949 film), an American Western film
- Outlaw Country (2012 film), an American television film
- Outlaw Country (Legends of Tomorrow), an episode of the American television series Legends of Tomorrow
