= Time Indefinite =

1993 documentary film by Ross McElwee

- Directed by: Ross McElwee
- Written by: Ross McElwee
- Cinematography: Ross McElwee
- Release date: 1993
- Running time: 114 min.
- Language: English

Time Indefinite is an autobiographical 1993 documentary film directed by Ross McElwee. It explores themes of grief, mortality, and the convenient disconnection of watching life through a camera lens.

The title comes from a passage from the Bible mentioned by a visiting Jehovah's Witness. McElwee is filming the interaction and focused on adjusting the exposure to try to catch the play of light over the man's face; distracted, he "hears" the phrase about 30 seconds after the man says it and understands it to refer to the unpredictable imminence of death.

== Synopsis ==
In the film, director Ross McElwee gets married, finally putting an end to his family's worrying; his grandmother dies; his wife Marilyn has a miscarriage; and his father, a medical doctor, dies suddenly within a week of McElwee's wife's miscarriage. His mother had died of cancer ten years earlier and so McElwee returns to his father's house, where his father's housekeeper ministers to him about Christianity and faith.

McElwee goes to visit his friend Charleen, who is now living alone in a new apartment. She had lived on an island in an old two-story house abandoned by the U.S. Army; she and her husband worked to restore it and lived together there for years before becoming estranged. Charleen then lived there alone, but on returning home from a trip she finds that her husband had set fire to the house and died downstairs at the grand piano in an arson/suicide. Charleen has her husband's cremated remains in a bag inside a box and tries to scatter his ashes but can't bring herself to do it.

McElwee's brother is a successful doctor; on a visit to his brother's practice, Ross talks with his brother about their father's unexplained death, which took them both by surprise. Ross's brother receives a patient who has a large malignant tumor on her breast; the woman has had the tumor for years without seeking medical help. Ross's brother takes a slide of the tumor for his files; it has spread across much of her chest and is both multifaceted and multicolored. Ross incorporates his brother's interview with the woman -— and the slide his brother takes -— into his film, musing in voiceover about motivation and fatality and marvelling at the power of denial.

Eventually Ross abandons the film, only to continue it later to document his wife's pregnancy. She successfully gives birth, and Ross and Marilyn go with their baby son to visit Charleen, who criticizes them for bringing children into such a hostile and unpredictable world but speaks to the passion that drives life and procreation. Ross and Marilyn dote on their son and seem largely unbothered by the criticism.

== Year-end lists ==
- 3rd – Peter Rainer, Los Angeles Times
