= In Paraguay =

2008 documentary by Ross McElwee

In Paraguay is a 2008 documentary film directed and shot by Ross McElwee, about his family's process to adopt a Paraguayan infant girl named Mariah.

In Paraguay premiered at the 2008 Venice Film Festival. The film combines archival footage with an exploration of modern issues.

== Reception ==
Ronnie Scheib of Variety wrote that In Paraguay "feels atypically passive — a homemovie [sic] whose shape and substance are devoid of the helmer’s familiar wry commentary", and that McElwee's "impudence is subdued by his first exploration of abject poverty, so much so that even the intricacies of Latin American bureaucracy fail to engage his satiric imagination".
