= Photographic Memory (film) =

2011 film by Ross McElwee

- Directed by: Ross McElwee
- Written by: Ross McElwee; Marie-Emmanuelle Hartness
- Produced by: Marie-Emmanuelle Hartness; Ross McElwee
- Starring: Adrian McElwee; Ross McElwee
- Cinematography: Sean Wilcox; Ross McElwee; Adrian McElwee
- Edited by: Sabrina Zanella-Foresi
- Music by: Dane Walker; DJ Flack; Charles Mingus
- Production company: St Quay Films
- Distributed by: First Run Features
- Release date: September 1, 2011 (Venice Film Festival)
- Running time: 84 minutes
- Countries: United States; France
- Languages: English; French
- Box office: $7,822

Photographic Memory is a 2011 documentary film by independent filmmaker Ross McElwee about a voyage back to the roots of his involvement with the camera.

Photographic Memory premiered at the 2011 Venice Film Festival and won the Sheffield Youth Jury Award at Sheffield Doc/Fest in June 2012.

== Synopsis ==
The filmmaker finds himself in frequent conflict with his son, who is no longer the delightful child the father loved, but an argumentative young adult who inhabits virtual worlds available through the internet. To the father, the son seems to be addicted to and permanently distracted by those worlds. The filmmaker undertakes a journey to St. Quay-Portrieux in Brittany where he worked for a spring as a wedding photographer's assistant at age 24 – slightly older than his son is now. He has not been back to St. Quay since that visit, and hopes to gain some perspective on what his own life was like when he was his son's age. He also hopes to track down his former employer, a fascinating Frenchman named Maurice, and Maud, a woman with whom he was romantically involved during that spring 38 years ago. Photographic Memory is a meditation on the passing of time, the praxis of photography and film, digital versus analog, and the fractured love of a father for his son.

== Reception ==
On the review aggregator website Rotten Tomatoes, 94% of 18 critics' reviews are positive. Metacritic, which uses a weighted average, assigned the film a score of 79 out of 100, based on nine critics, indicating "generally favorable" reviews.

Lee Marshall of Screen Daily wrote, "The result, told with all the spontaneity that only a one-man-band director who is also the film's main subject can manage, is a sad, funny, homespun, often quite moving meditation on the passing of time and the evanescence of recorded memories."
