= Five O'Clock News =

The Five O'Clock News may refer to:

== Canada ==
- CTV News at 5 (Maritimes) (2012-present)

== Ireland ==
- Virgin Media News at 5.30 (2001-present)

== UK ==
- BBC News at Five (2006-2020)
- ITV News at 5:30 (1988-2012)
- Live at Five (Sky News programme)
- 5 News (1997-present)

== See also ==
- One O'Clock News (disambiguation)
- Six O'Clock News (disambiguation)
- Nine O'Clock News (disambiguation)
- News at Ten (disambiguation)
