= Vlada Petrić =

American film historian (1928–2019)

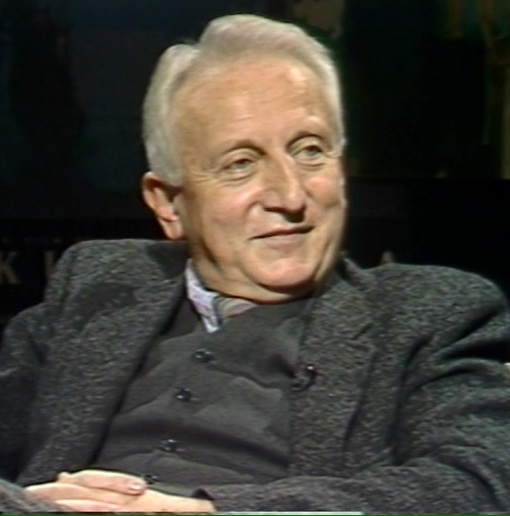
Petrić discusses The Color of Pomegranates on CUNY TV's Cinema Then, Cinema Now (1988)

Vladimir "Vlada" Petrić (March 11, 1928 – November 13, 2019) was a theoretician, historian and aesthetician of cinema, a professor at Harvard University and co-founder of the Harvard Film Archive. Petrić was the first scholar to receive a doctoral degree in film studies in the United States at New York University in the Department of Cinema Studies.

At the beginning of his career he was involved as a director in film, television and theater, and later focused on experimental film. He was the recipient of many awards, including a Fulbright scholarship to the United States and the prestigious award from the Anthology Film Archives in New York City.

== Biography ==
=== Childhood and education ===
Vladimir Petrić was born in 1928 in Prnjavor, Bosnia, Yugoslavia, where he attended the first two grades of elementary school. Before the outbreak of World War II, he attended school in Bosanska Gradiška, in Bosnia. His family moved to Serbia, where his father was a geodesist in Pančevo, where Petrić finished his primary and secondary education and graduated in 1948. As a student, he participated in a Drama Studio, which was an adjunct of the Pančevo Theater, one of the most important theaters in Serbia, headed by the famous Russian director and pedagogue, Alexander Vereshchagin. In 1949 he passed the entrance exams for both the Drama Studio at the National Theater in Belgrade and the Serbian Film School. Although he loved theater, he opted for the Film School, which was then headed by the Zagreb actor Vjekoslav Afrić, who had also been the director of the first Yugoslav feature-length film, Slavica (1947). After Film School, Petrić had a position at the Academy of Theater, Film, Radio and Television. He became an assistant to Afrić in his directing class and to Josip Kulundžić in his acting class, while at the same time continuing with his studies at the Faculty of Philosophy at the University of Belgrade, where he graduated in the Department of English Language and Literature in 1956, and in 1958 graduated in theater directing after studying with Kulundžić.

=== Early career ===
Petrić became an associate professor of film history at the Academy of Theater, Film, Radio and Television in 1959 and in the following year received the title of professor.

He began his career as a film director at Radio Television Belgrade when it was first established in 1958. Petrić participated in the performance of the first television program that was broadcast. It was the first televised broadcast of a theater play, which took place on December 28, 1958, performed at the avant-garde theater Atelje 212. The play Ljubovna zavist črez jedne cipele by Joakim Vujić was adapted and directed by Petrić, who received an award for directing at the Sterijino Pozorje Festival for this play. Between 1960 and 1965 he was head of film department at Radio Television Belgrade and editor of movie program.

Petrić simultaneously published literary and theatre critiques, articles and essays in Politika and NIN, as well as in magazines and journals such as Književnost, Delo, Savremenik, Scena, Književne novine, Mladost, Letopis Matice Srpske, Kultura, Film, Filmske sveske, Polja, and others. At this time he directed the ritual drama Slovo svetlosti on the stage of the Serbian National Theater in Novi Sad. In Petrić's manuscript legacy there is a substantial chronicle which details the creative process of this experimental stage achievement and the preparatory work on it.

In the period between 1965 and 1968 Petrić spent three semesters attending specialist studies at the All-Union State Institute of Cinematography (VGIK) in Moscow, where he intended to join the doctoral program at that institute, but was unsuccessful due to an ideological disagreement with professor Nikolai Lebedev, and he subsequently returned to Belgrade. While in Moscow, he studied Soviet film under the tutelage of the great Soviet filmmaker Lev Kuleshov.

=== Departure for the United States ===
As a recipient of the Fulbright scholarship, and at the invitation of the Film Archive at the Museum of Modern Art (MoMA), he left for New York City in 1969, where he began work on the classification of Soviet silent films. He simultaneously started gathering the materials for his doctoral dissertation (on the relationship between Soviet and American silent film), which he defended in 1973 at New York University, thereby becoming the first doctor of Cinema Studies in the United States. He became an associate professor of English Language and Literature at the State University of New York in the period between 1972 and 1974, as well as a visiting professor at Purchase College at the Conservatory of Theater Arts.

=== Engagement at Harvard University ===
Immediately after receiving his doctoral degree (in 1973), Petrić received a position at the Henry Luce Chair at Harvard University, where he lectured as a professor of film history and theory. He remained in that position until his retirement in 1997. He held lectures at a multitude of universities in the United States, Europe and Asia during this time. Together with the documentary filmmaker Robert Gardner and the philosopher Stanley Cavell, Petrić established the Harvard Film Archive and became its first curator, fulfilling this duty until his retirement. Throughout his career, he published essays and critiques in eminent magazines such as Sight & Sound, Film Comment, Cinema Journal, Film Quarterly, The Harvard Crimson, Harvard Magazine, Harvard Gazette, etc.

=== Theatrical, cinematic and literary opus ===
"Since the middle of the 1970's, Petrić authored a series of films and books which extol cinema. The Studio for Digital Media at the Yugoslav Film Archive in Belgrade is named in his honor. He is the recipient of a lifetime achievement award from the Belgrade Festival of Documentary and Short Film, where he had earlier received an award for the screenplay of his documentary film Wall of Memories."

Some of Petrić's most successful plays include Teater Joakima Vujića performed at the Atelje 212 (1958), Slovo svetlosti at the Serbian National Theater in Novi Sad (1967), and an adaptation of Ingmar Bergman’s Persona in Cambridge, Massachusetts in the US (1980). He directed the short experimental film Kobna žed (1964) in cooperation with Ljubomir Radičević and also directed the 50-minute feature film Kavez (1966). In 1970, he appeared as a supporting actor in Mel Brooks’ film The Twelve Chairs (1970). His experimental film Light Play – A Replay from 1990 represents a cinematic appropriation of the film Ein Lichtspiel Schwarz Weiss Grau by Laszlo Moholy-Nagy (1930), while the intimate digital essay Wall of Memories from 2003 represents a "digital manifesto" of Petrić's career.

The scholarly theoretical works by Petrić encompass works of seminal importance to film theory and history, in which he primarily focused on researching and promoting film (cinema) as an autonomous artistic medium. He published a significant number of books both in Yugoslavia and the United States: Čarobni ekran (1962), Šekspir i film (1964), Uvođenje u film (1964), Razvoj filmskih vrsta (1969), Televizija – osma sila (1970), Griffith’s Early Masterpiece: A Corner in Wheat (1979), Six Essays on Film (1980), Film and Dreams: An Approach to Bergman (1981), Constructivism in Film: The Man With the Movie Camera – A Cinematic Analysis (1987).

He died in Belgrade, Serbia.

== Petrić on art ==
=== On artistic creativity ===
- “My thought experiment on Mona Lisa, located in a basement, has a metaphorical meaning; she points to values which exist no matter how a certain environment or social group will accept them and interpret them. This is not a sort of idealism, but a separation of artistic creation from all social, economic, political, religious and other historical categories. Experience has shown that all attempts to submit art to these categories have been untenable."
- "It is impossible to request art to create in one particular mode or another because then it becomes something completely different. Art is completely autonomous, and any attempt to violently influence its direction destroys its veracity and immediacy. Only when it is immediate is it great, no matter if it is currently liked or not. If it is false, then it is worthless, no matter how useful or popular it is at that given moment."

=== On alternative film ===
- "In the domain of alternative film the process of experimenting is more significant than the resulting product. The alternative cinematic process implies a search, which points to new expressive possibilities for film, a search which might only in the future result in complete works of art, a search whose final goal is not to have an immediate result. Alternative film changes the very consciousness of the director in the creative process. In such a manner, the discovery of new forms of expression becomes even more significant."

=== On the effect of cinematic motion pictures ===
- "The emotional, psychological and contemplative effect of a cinematic motion picture should be purposefully used so that the viewer can feel through it not just the true meaning of the content (which should be the purpose towards which the meaning of the cinematic picture should strive), but that it should also contemplatively fulfill them by stimulating them through the visual meaning of the shot."
- "By standing before reality with a camera in hand, the director should isolate a characteristic detail from it and express his relationship to it in such a manner that it should awaken an aesthetic feeling in us."
- "Everything acquires a soul on the screen, while the human face, which already possesses a soul, has its agency intensified and meaning broadened."

=== On theatrical art ===
- "Theater is close to, the closest to a human being, through the very fact that it is expressed through a human being, thereby interpreting and revealing one's life, whence one is eternally dying as an individual and is being eternally reborn in ever newer modes. Therefore, theatrical art is ephemeral: every realization within its framework is destined to pass away after a certain amount of time or, to put it more appropriately, it is destined to change and transform from one form into another."

=== On Slavko Vorkapić ===
- "In Vorki’s presence, I came to understand the absolute necessity of insisting on the purity of cinematic expression, having myself noticed the pedagogic importance of such a concept, even if presented in an exaggerated manner. The final result of such insistence leads towards the liberation of the cinematic medium from the conventional forms of commercial film. Only in that domain can any qualitative jump into a new aesthetic structure be accomplished, a structure which being persistently and mercilessly subjected to trite clichés which are deeply implanted into the conventional cinematic production that is dictated by the spirit of a consumerist society."

=== On Marina Abramović ===
- "The precipitous claim that what is before us is mere exhibitionism and a desire for glory is the consequence of contemplative superficiality and abhorrence towards new forms of modern (unconventional) public communication. By being decisive in her endeavors to tame her own ego through publicly testing the endurance of her body, Marina has radically rejected (petit) bourgeois considerations."

== The Vlada Petrić Foundation ==
The Vlada Petrić Foundation is dedicated to the preservation and promotion of the life and works of Vlada Petrić. The basic goal of the Foundation is to gather and present Vlada Petrić's works in the fields of film history, theory, and aesthetics, as well as his works on art in general. The Foundation has as its goal to publish Petrić's written works as well as to organize exhibitions, symposia and scholarly events and the awarding of prizes in collaboration with the Harvard Film Archive and the Yugoslav Film Archive. The Foundation also collaborates with cultural institutions, artistic organizations and individuals who are conducting research and creating works in the field of film and art. Moreover, the Foundation contributes to the expansion of the material contained in the Vlada Petrić Collection, which is part of the Harvard Film Archive, to assist in the promotion of scholarly research.

== Bibliography ==
- Čarobni ekran. Belgrade: Narodna kniga, 1962.
- Šekspir i film. Belgrade: Jugoslovenska kinoteka, 1964.
- Teatar Joakima Vujića. Belgrade: Nolit, 1965.
- Uvođenje u film. Belgrade: Umetnička Akademija, 1968.
- Razvoj filmskih vrsta. Belgrade: Umetnička Akademija, 1970.
- Osma sila – Televizija. Belgrade: Radio-televizija, 1971.
- D.W. Griffith’s A Corner in Wheat: A Critical Analysis. Cambridge, MA: University Film Study Center, 1975.
- Six Essays on Film, Quarterly Review of Film Studies, 1980.
- Film and Dreams: An Approach to Bergman, Redgrave, NY, 1981.
- Constructivism in Film: The Man With the Movie Camera. N.Y.: Cambridge University Press, 1987; second edition 1993; revised edition 2011.

== Filmography ==
=== As director ===
- Barba Žvane (assistant director), 1949.
- Kobna žeđ, short film, 1956.
- Ljubavno pismo, television film, 1959.
- Laža i paralaža, television film, 1959.
- Msje Žosef, television film, 1960.
- Velika noćna misterija, television film, 1960.
- Trka, television film, 1961.
- Mica i Mikica, television film, 1961.
- Zločin Silvestra Bonara, television film, 1962.
- Bilo ih je sedam, television film, 1962.
- Mačka na šinama, television film, 1966.
- Kavez, feature film, 1966.
- Apokalipsa, television film, 1968.
- Sve će to narod pozlatiti, television film, 1969.
- Švabica, television film, 1969.
- Prvi put sa ocem na jutrenje, television film, 1969.
- Light Play – A Replay, experimental film, 1990.
- Wall of Memories, digital essay, 2003.

=== As screenwriter ===
- Kobna žeđ, short film, 1956.
- Novogodišnji poklon, television film, 1962.
- Vilijam Šekspir, short film, 1964.
- Transmigracija duša, television film, adaptation, 1964.
- Večeras improvizujemo Rajkina, television film, 1966.
- Švabica, television film, 1969.
- Prvi put sa ocem na jutrenje, television film, adaptation, 1969.
- Sve če to narod pozlatiti, television film, adaptation, 1969.
- Lepotica iz Amhersta, television film, adaptation, 1985.
- Reminescencija, short film, 2002.

=== As actor ===
- Priča o fabrici – gost na prijemu, 1949.
- Barba Žvane, 1949.
- Gospođa ministarka, 1958.
- Večeras improvizujemo Rajkina, television film, 1966.
- The Twelve Chairs, 1970.
- Bright Leaves, himself, 2003.
