= Harvard Film Archive =

Film archive in the United States

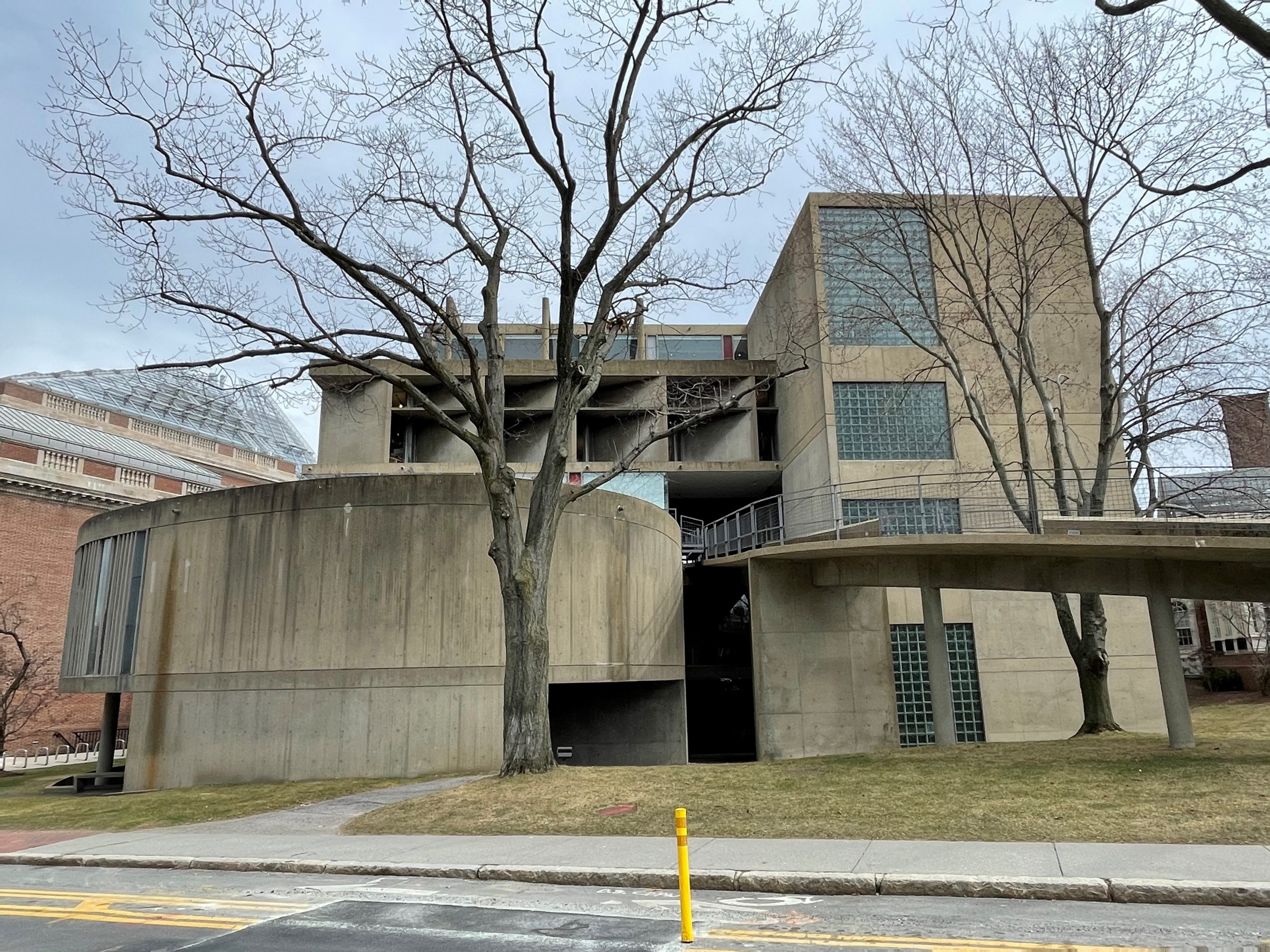
- The Carpenter Center, home of the Harvard Film Archive
- Established: March 16, 1979; 47 years ago
- Location: Carpenter Center for the Visual Arts, Harvard University, Cambridge, Massachusetts, U.S.
- Coordinates: 42°22′25.15″N 71°06′53.06″W
- Type: Film archive
- Collections: Over 25,000 films
- Founders: Robert Gardner; Vlada K. Petric; Stanley Cavell
- Director: Haden Guest
- Website: harvardfilmarchive.org

The Harvard Film Archive (HFA) is a film archive and cinema located in the Carpenter Center for the Visual Arts at Harvard University in Cambridge, Massachusetts. Dedicated to the collection, preservation, and exhibition of film, the HFA houses over 25,000 films, along with videos, photos, posters, and other film ephemera from around the world and almost every period in film history. The HFA cinematheque screens films weekly in its 188-seat theater. It also maintains a film conservation center near Central Square, Cambridge. Harvard Film Archive won the 2020 Webby Award for Cultural Institution in the category Web.

== History ==
The archive was founded in 1979 by Robert Gardner, Vlada K. Petric and Stanley Cavell in Harvard's Department of Visual and Environmental Studies, with grants from the Henry Luce Foundation and the National Endowment for the Humanities. It opened on March 16, 1979, with a screening of Ernst Lubitsch’s silent film, Lady Windermere's Fan.

Film programmer Amos Vogel's extensive Cinema 16 film collection, originally sold to Barney Rosset and Grove Press circa 1966–1967, served as the founding collection for the Harvard Film Archive.

The archive's first curator was Vlada K. Petric, who expanded the collection and established the year-round regular screenings. He retired in 1995, and in 1999 Bruce Jenkins assumed the post.

In January 2005, Harvard Faculty of Arts and Sciences dean William C. Kirby announced that the archive would be absorbed by the Harvard College Library and managed by the Library of Fine Arts. This raised concerns within the Harvard community about the future of the archive and its programming. Jenkins resigned soon after the announcement.

In September 2006, film scholar Haden Guest became the new director of the archive. He addressed concerns that the archives' absorption in the Library would affect its public film screenings.

== Collection ==
The collection spans the history of film-making from the silent film era to today, and includes Hollywood films, documentaries, animation, short films, B-movies and feature films from all over the world. It is the largest collection of 35mm film in New England. The collection grows by an average of 15 to 20 films a year and contains rarities, including some of the only prints in the United States of several films by Serbian director Dusan Makavejev. It also features a large collection of German cinema and the Bavarian Film Fund donates prints of any films that it finances. After the death of Karen Aqua, the archive was given more than 300 of her works, both completed and unfinished.

== Film conservation ==
The Archive's mission includes conserving, restoring, and exhibiting the collection's prints. It prioritizes film-to-film preservation for archival stability, authenticity, and aesthetics. It may also perform film-to-digital transfers.
