= Ross McElwee =

American documentary filmmaker (born 1947)

- Born: July 21, 1947 (age 79); Charlotte, North Carolina, U.S.
- Occupations: Filmmaker, Professor
- Website: rossmcelwee.com

Ross Simonton McElwee III is an American documentary filmmaker known for his autobiographical films about his family and personal life, usually interwoven with an episodic journey that intersects with larger political or philosophical issues. His humorous and often self-deprecating films refer to cultural aspects of his Southern upbringing. He received the Career Award at the 2007 Full Frame Documentary Film Festival.

== Early life and education ==
Ross McElwee grew up in Charlotte, North Carolina, in a traditional Southern family. His father was a surgeon and appears often as a figure in McElwee's early films. McElwee later attended Brown University, where he studied under novelist John Hawkes, and graduated in 1971 with a degree in creative writing. While at Brown, he also cross-registered in still photography courses at Rhode Island School of Design.

After graduating, McElwee lived for a year in Brittany, France, where he worked for a while as a wedding photographer's assistant. Upon returning to the US, he was admitted into MIT's new graduate filmmaking program and graduated in 1977 with an M.S. While at MIT, he studied under documentarians Richard Leacock and Ed Pincus, both pioneers of the cinéma vérité movement, with whom he refined his first-person narrative approach. "It was a new way of making films, to eliminate the film crew. You lose some technical polish, but it's much more intimate and less intimidating to your subjects. It allows you to shoot with the autonomy and flexibility of a photojournalist."

== Career ==
McElwee's film career began in his hometown, Charlotte, North Carolina, where he found summer employment as a studio cameraman for local evening news, housewife helper shows, and "gospel hour" programs. Later, he freelanced as second cameraman for documentarians D.A. Pennebaker, and later for John Marshall in Namibia. McElwee started filming and producing his own documentaries in 1976. McElwee began teaching filmmaking at Harvard University in 1986; as of July 2022 he was a professor of the practice of filmmaking in the Department of Visual and Environmental Studies.

McElwee has made ten feature-length documentaries and several shorter films. Most of his films were shot in his homeland, the American South, among them Sherman's March (1986), Time Indefinite, Six O'Clock News, and Bright Leaves. The latter is about the tobacco industry and the McElwee family's history. The film's title echoes the Hollywood movie Bright Leaf which McElwee thinks represents his great-grandparents, portrayed by Patricia Neal and Gary Cooper.

He collaborated with his wife, Marilyn Levine, on Something to Do with the Wall. His 2011 film, Photographic Memory, breaks new ground in its fully digital process and in its open development and production structure.

McElwee is known for his "memoir-driven documentary storytelling" which influenced other nonfiction storytellers like Ira Glass, Michael Moore, and John Wilson. He weaves his own life circumstances with the topic that he is ostensibly documenting, and makes heavy use of voice over, something most other documentarians eschew.

== Recognition ==
Sherman's March won numerous awards, including Best Documentary at the Sundance Film Festival. It was cited by the National Board of Film Critics as one of the five best films of 1986. Time Indefinite won a best film award in several festivals and was distributed theatrically throughout the U.S. Six O'Clock News premiered at the Sundance Film Festival and was broadcast nationally over PBS' Frontline.

McElwee's films have been included in the festivals of Cannes, Berlin, London, Venice, Vienna, Rotterdam, Florence, and Sydney. Retrospectives include the Museum of Modern Art, the Art Institute of Chicago, and the Museum of the Moving Image in New York. Retrospectives have also been held in Paris, Tehran, Moscow, Seoul, Lisbon, and Quito. McElwee has received fellowships and grants from the John Simon Guggenheim Memorial Foundation, the Rockefeller Foundation, and the American Film Institute. He has twice been awarded fellowships in filmmaking by the National Endowment for the Arts. Sherman's March was chosen for preservation by the Library of Congress National Film Registry in 2000 as an "historically significant American motion picture".

McElwee's film Bright Leaves premiered at the 2003 Cannes Film Festival's Directors' Fortnight, and was nominated for Best Documentary of 2004 by both the Directors Guild of America and the Writers Guild of America.

In Paraguay premiered at the Venice Film Festival in 2008. McElwee returned to Venice in 2011 to present the premier of Photographic Memory.

In July 2025 it was announced that his newest film Remake would have its world premiere at the 82nd Venice International Film Festival, where it won the Golden Globes Impact Prize for Documentary. The deeply personal, self-reflexive film uses footage from multiple earlier films in McElwee's body of work in order to tell an autobiographical story that encapsulates the loss of his son and his reflections on his career in motion pictures. The film went on to screen at the True/False Film Festival and the International Documentary Film Festival Amsterdam.

== Filmography ==
=== Director ===
- Charleen (1978)
- Space Coast (1979) - co-director Michel Negroponte
- Resident Exile (1981) - co-director Alex Anthony and Michel Negroponte
- Backyard (1984)
- Sherman's March (1986)
- Something to Do with the Wall (1990) - co-director Marilyn Levine
- Time Indefinite (1993)
- Six O'Clock News (1997)
- Bright Leaves (2003)
- In Paraguay (2008)
- Photographic Memory (2011)
- Remake (2025)
