= News at Ten =

The News at Ten or Ten O'Clock News is a news program that usually airs in the late evening on a TV channel. It may refer to:

- ITV News at Ten (1967–1999; 2001–2004; 2008–present), or more commonly News at Ten, the main late evening newscast on ITV in the United Kingdom, produced by ITN
- The Ten O'Clock News (1976–1991), a defunct evening newscast on WGBH-TV Boston
- Sky News at Ten (1999–2026), a defunct evening newscast on Sky News
- BBC News at Ten (2000–present), formerly BBC Ten O'Clock News, the main late evening newscast on BBC One in the United Kingdom
- A song on the album New Clear Days by The Vapors

== See also ==
- One O'Clock News (disambiguation)
- Five O'Clock News (disambiguation)
- Six O'Clock News (disambiguation)
- Nine O'Clock News (disambiguation)
