= Melvin and Howard =

1980 film by Jonathan Demme

- Theatrical release poster by John Alvin
- Directed by: Jonathan Demme
- Written by: Bo Goldman
- Produced by: Art Linson; Don Phillips
- Starring: Paul Le Mat; Mary Steenburgen; Pamela Reed; Jason Robards
- Cinematography: Tak Fujimoto
- Edited by: Craig McKay
- Music by: Bruce Langhorne
- Distributed by: Universal Pictures
- Release date: September 19, 1980
- Running time: 95 minutes
- Country: United States
- Language: English
- Budget: $7 million
- Box office: $4.3 million

Melvin and Howard (stylized as Melvin (and Howard)) is a 1980 American comedy-drama film directed by Jonathan Demme. The screenplay by Bo Goldman was inspired by real-life Utah service station owner Melvin Dummar, who was listed as the beneficiary of $156 million in a will allegedly handwritten by Howard Hughes that was discovered in the headquarters of the Church of Jesus Christ of Latter-day Saints in Salt Lake City. A novelization of Goldman's script, which itself won the Academy Award for Best Screenplay – Written Directly for the Screen, later was written by George Gipe. The film stars Paul Le Mat, Jason Robards, and Mary Steenburgen, who won the Academy Award for Best Supporting Actress. The film was released on September 19, 1980, receiving positive reviews from critics.

== Plot ==
Billionaire Howard Hughes loses control of his motorcycle and crashes in the desert near Tonopah, Nevada. That night, he is discovered lying on the side of a stretch of U.S. Route 95 when Melvin Dummar, a magnesium plant worker, stops his pickup truck to urinate. The disheveled stranger, refusing to allow Melvin to take him to the hospital, asks him to instead drive him to Las Vegas. As Melvin makes small talk, the stranger reveals that he is Howard Hughes, but Melvin does not believe him. Melvin cajoles his passenger into joining him in singing a Christmas song he wrote. Howard then suggests they sing "Bye Bye Blackbird", which they do. The man warms to his rescuer and is dropped off in the parking lot of the Desert Inn.

Melvin returns to his trailer home in Gabbs, Nevada, which he shares with his wife Lynda and daughter Darcy. Later that morning, Lynda awakens and sees their motorcycle and pickup truck being repossessed. While Melvin is sleeping, Lynda takes Darcy and leaves for Reno. Lynda refuses to return to Melvin, but sends Darcy to live with her father. Heartbroken over Lynda, Melvin searches for her in Reno, where he finds her dancing in a sleazy strip club. Melvin loses his temper and causes a scene, leading Lynda to lose her job. While Lynda is working as a scantily clad barmaid at another establishment, Melvin delivers divorce papers that grant him sole custody of Darcy. The couple fights, and Lynda quits.

Some time later, a pregnant Lynda calls Melvin from Anaheim, California, asking to see Darcy. He invites her to return home, and they remarry in a quick Las Vegas ceremony before relocating to Glendale, California, where Melvin takes a job as a milkman. Lynda gives birth to a baby boy named Farron. After their car is repossessed, Melvin convinces Lynda to appear as a contestant on the television game show Easy Street. Although her tap dancing is initially booed by the audience, she wins them over and eventually receives the top prize—a set of living room furniture, a piano, and a check for $10,000.

With the money, the couple buys a modest tract home. While Lynda tries to keep their finances under control, Melvin impulsively buys an expensive Cadillac Eldorado and a motorboat. When Melvin refuses to return the items, Lynda calls him a "loser" and leaves him, taking Darcy and Farron with her. Melvin soon begins a relationship with Bonnie, the payroll clerk at the dairy where he drives a truck, and the two eventually move to Willard, Utah, where they take over the operation of a gas station formerly owned by her cousin.

One day, a mysterious man in a limousine stops at the gas station ostensibly to buy a pack of cigarettes, but after he drives off, Melvin discovers an envelope containing Howard's will on his office desk. He travels to Salt Lake City and leaves the envelope in a pile of incoming mail at the offices of the Mormon Church. Soon, Bonnie receives a call informing her that Melvin is one of 16 beneficiaries of $156 million named in an alleged Howard Hughes will. As Melvin becomes the subject of intense media attention, he also faces accusations of fraud.

In a courtroom in Las Vegas, Melvin tells lawyers he delivered the will to the church because he was afraid, though he insists he is telling the truth about meeting Howard Hughes. Judge Keith Hayes, convinced that Melvin is lying, threatens to send him to Nevada State Prison. After the court hearing, Melvin's lawyer thinks he has a chance to inherit the money. Melvin says he does not care if he does not receive the money, and is happy to have the memory of Howard singing his Christmas song. After meeting with Lynda and picking up the children, Melvin recalls Howard asking to drive his truck; as Melvin falls sleep, Howard drives and sings "Bye Bye Blackbird".

== Cast ==
- Paul Le Mat as Melvin Dummar
- Jason Robards as Howard Hughes
- Mary Steenburgen as Lynda West Dummar
- Jack Kehoe as Jim Delgado
- Michael J. Pollard as "Little Red"
- Pamela Reed as Bonnie Bonneau Dummar
- Dabney Coleman as Judge Keith Hayes
- John Glover as Freese
- Charles Napier as Ventura
- Charlene Holt as Mrs. Worth
- Elizabeth Cheshire as Darcy Dummar
- Robert Ridgely as Wally "Mr. Love" Williams
- Susan Peretz as chapel owner
- Gloria Grahame as Mrs. Sisk
- Rick Lenz as Melvin's lawyer
- Chip Taylor as Clark Taylor
- Gary Goetzman as Melvin's cousin Fred
- Cheryl Smith as patient Ronnie

The real Melvin Dummar has a cameo appearance as a man behind a bus depot counter. Gloria Grahame has a short appearance as Mrs. Sisk, but the majority of her role was cut and does not speak any dialogue.

== Production ==
Art Linson worked with music supervisor Don Phillips who wanted to be a producer. Philips would bring Linson ideas for films, one of them being an article about Melvin Dummar. Linson felt there was only a movie in the story if Dummar was telling the truth. When Linson met with Dummar he was so taken with the man and his story he agreed to make the movie.

Linson set up the project with Universal. Bo Goldman was originally hired by Universal president Ned Tanen to meet with Melvin Dummar in 1976, and Goldman then worked his story into a screenplay, even after Dummar's will was determined to be a fake. Linson said the first draft was called Sonny and focused on Dunmnar's childhood. Linson and the studio liked the writing but felt it needed another draft.

Mike Nichols was originally slated to direct the film, and supervised an eight-week rewrite by Goldman. After months of deliberation, Nichols decided not to direct. Linson wrote "It wasn’t the first script that Nichols had walked away from after making it better. He was having a great deal of trouble pulling the trigger in those days; the pressure of failure was overtaking the joy of success." Linson said Universal remained committed in part because the studio had invested so much money in the script. Eventually Jonathan Demme signed to direct.

Jack Nicholson and Diane Keaton were in talks to star, but they dropped out of the project. Demme wanted to use Paul Le Mat and Roberts Blossom, who had been in Citizens Band. However Universal wanted a star so Jason Roberts replaced Blossom.

=== Shooting ===
Filming began in Glendale, California on February 26, 1979, and also took place in Salt Lake City and Willard, Utah as well as Las Vegas, Nevada, lasting a total of 10 weeks and wrapping on May 10, 1979.

Mary Steenburgen revealed that she was worried about having to appear completely naked in the film. "In a scene, I'm at a strip joint and I quit. I rip off what I'm wearing, throw it in the air, and walk naked out of the place. The night before the scene, I thought, 'Who is going to be there tomorrow? There's going to be a skeleton crew.' I didn't sleep that night, but I thought I was prepared for what was going to happen. I had totally forgotten there were going to be about sixty guys – extras from Central Casting – sitting around. I did it OK for about the first eight times, but I started to lose it. I was becoming upset because these guys kept making comments. I called Malcolm [McDowell], and he said, 'Listen, you've done it. You have already put it on film. Do it one more time, and just try and do it real well.' I had lost sight of that. I was so busy worrying about my clothes I had forgotten about the moment of it. I knew it was a moment of bravery and freedom, and he reminded me of that. So I went back and I did it really well. As I walked out, I flipped off the construction hat of the guy at the bar and I waved goodbye to all the other dancers on the stage. That is the one they used," Steenburgen recalled.

Monty Hall was going to play himself in the film but a week before he was to shoot he read the script and dropped out. The script had to be rewritten so his character became a fictional one.

== Reception ==
=== Box office ===
The film was not a box office success but was highly acclaimed critically.

=== Critical response ===
On review aggregator website Rotten Tomatoes the film holds an approval rating of 92% based on 24 reviews, with an average rating of 8/10. The site's critics consensus reads: "A spirited character study and clear-eyed treatise of the American Dream, Melvin and Howard hits the jackpot with its lovable cast and director Jonathan Demme's humanism."

In his review in The New York Times, Vincent Canby called the film a "sharp, engaging, very funny, anxious comedy" and commented, "Mr. Demme is a lyrical film maker for whom there is purpose in style...Melvin and Howard is commercial American movie-making of a most expansive, entertaining kind."

Roger Ebert of the Chicago Sun-Times described it as "wonderful" and added, "This is a slice of American life. It shows the flip side of Gary Gilmore's Utah. It is a world of mobile homes, Pop Tarts, dust, kids and dreams of glory. It's pretty clear how this movie got made. Hollywood started with the notion that the story of the mysterious Hughes will might make a good courtroom thriller. Well, maybe it would have. But my hunch is that when they met Dummar, they had the good sense to realize that they could get a better – and certainly a funnier – story out of what happened to him between the day he met Hughes and the day the will was discovered. Dummar is the kind of guy who thinks they oughta make a movie out of his life. This time, he was right."

Variety said, "Jonathan Demme's tour-de-force direction, the imaginative screenplay and top-drawer performances from a huge cast fuse in an unusual, original creation."

Pauline Kael gave the film a very positive review in The New Yorker: "Jonathan Demme's lyrical comedy Melvin and Howard which opened the New York Film Festival on September 26, is an almost flawless act of sympathetic imagination. I doubt if Jason Robards has ever been greater than he is here. Mary Steenburgen's Lynda Dummar has a soft mouth and a tantalizing slender wiggliness, and she talks directly to whomever she's talking to – when she listens, she's the kind of woman a man wants to tell more to. Demme shows perhaps a finer understanding of lower-middle-class life than any other American director."

Dennis Bingham's Whose Lives Are They Anyway? The Biopic as Contemporary Film Genre cites Melvin and Howard as the first film in the subgenre "biopic of someone undeserving," or "BOSUD," which was later popularized by Scott Alexander and Larry Karaszewski with Ed Wood, Man on the Moon, The People vs. Larry Flynt, and Auto Focus.

Paul Thomas Anderson has cited the film as one of his favorites. Jason Robards's last feature film appearance was in Anderson's Magnolia. Robert Ridgely, who played the host of the fictional "Easy Street" game show in this movie, would later be cast as Colonel James in Anderson's Boogie Nights.

The comedy show SCTV parodied the film in a sketch called "Melvin and Howards". Melvin (Rick Moranis), after picking up Howard Hughes (Joe Flaherty), also picks up Howard Cosell (Eugene Levy), Senator Howard Baker (Dave Thomas), and Curly Howard (John Candy).

=== Accolades ===
Award	Category	Recipient(s)	Result
Academy Awards	Best Supporting Actor	Jason Robards	Nominated
Academy Awards	Best Supporting Actress	Mary Steenburgen	Won
Academy Awards	Best Screenplay – Written Directly for the Screen	Bo Goldman	Won
Boston Society of Film Critics Awards	Best American Film	Melvin and Howard	Won
Boston Society of Film Critics Awards	Best Supporting Actor	Jason Robards	Won
Boston Society of Film Critics Awards	Best Supporting Actress	Mary Steenburgen	Won
Boston Society of Film Critics Awards	Best Screenplay	Bo Goldman	Won
Golden Globe Awards	Best Motion Picture – Musical or Comedy	Melvin and Howard	Nominated
Golden Globe Awards	Best Actor in a Motion Picture – Musical or Comedy	Paul Le Mat	Nominated
Golden Globe Awards	Best Supporting Actor – Motion Picture	Jason Robards	Nominated
Golden Globe Awards	Best Supporting Actress – Motion Picture	Mary Steenburgen	Won
Kansas City Film Critics Circle Awards	Best Supporting Actress	Mary Steenburgen	Won
Los Angeles Film Critics Association Awards	Best Supporting Actress	Mary Steenburgen	Won
National Board of Review Awards	Top Ten Films	Melvin and Howard	5th Place
National Society of Film Critics Awards	Best Film	Melvin and Howard	Won
National Society of Film Critics Awards	Best Director	Jonathan Demme	2nd Place
National Society of Film Critics Awards	Best Supporting Actor	Jason Robards	3rd Place
National Society of Film Critics Awards	Best Supporting Actress	Mary Steenburgen	Won
National Society of Film Critics Awards	Best Screenplay	Bo Goldman	Won
New York Film Critics Circle Awards	Best Film	Melvin and Howard	Runner-up
New York Film Critics Circle Awards	Best Director	Jonathan Demme	Won
New York Film Critics Circle Awards	Best Supporting Actor	Jason Robards	Runner-up
New York Film Critics Circle Awards	Best Supporting Actress	Mary Steenburgen	Won
New York Film Critics Circle Awards	Best Screenplay	Bo Goldman	Won
Venice International Film Festival	Golden Lion	Jonathan Demme	Nominated
Writers Guild of America Awards	Best Drama Written Directly for the Screen	Bo Goldman	Won

== See also ==
- List of American films of 1980
- The Amazing Howard Hughes (1977)
