= One O'Clock News =

The One O'Clock News may refer to:

- ITN News at One (1976-1987, 1988-1991)
- BBC News at One (1986-present)
- RTÉ News: One O'Clock (1989-present)
- RTÉ News at One

== See also ==
- Five O'Clock News (disambiguation)
- Six O'Clock News (disambiguation)
- Nine O'Clock News (disambiguation)
- News at Ten (disambiguation)
