= Nine O'Clock News =

The Nine O'Clock News may refer to:

- BBC Nine O'Clock News (1970–2000)
- KBS Nine O'Clock News, also known as KBS News 9 (1973–present)
- Not the Nine O'Clock News (1979–1982)
  - Not Necessarily the News, based on Not the Nine O'Clock News (1983–1990)
- RTÉ News: Nine O'Clock (1961–present)

== See also ==
- One O'Clock News (disambiguation)
- Five O'Clock News (disambiguation)
- Six O'Clock News (disambiguation)
- Ten O'Clock News (disambiguation)
