= Paul Le Mat =

American actor (born 1945)

- Born: September 22, 1945 (age 81); Rahway, New Jersey, U.S.
- Occupation: Actor
- Years active: 1972–present
- Spouse: Suzanne de Passe (m. 1978; div. 1994)
- Children: Three
- Website: www.paullemat.com

Paul Le Mat (born September 22, 1945) is an American actor. He first came to prominence with his role in American Graffiti (1973); his performance was met with critical acclaim and earned him the Golden Globe Award for New Star of the Year – Actor.

Le Mat's breakout performance in George Lucas's American Graffiti landed him the lead role in box office hit Aloha, Bobby and Rose (1975). He also is known for his work in the Jonathan Demme films Handle with Care (1977) and Melvin and Howard (1980). He won another Golden Globe award for his performance in the TV film The Burning Bed (1984) and starred in the cult film Puppet Master (1989), which spawned a franchise.

== Early life and education ==
Le Mat was born to Matthew (1914–1963) and Elizabeth LeMat (1917–2016). He graduated from Newport Harbor High School in 1963, and attended San Diego City College, Cypress Junior College, Chapman College, and eventually received an Associate of Arts degree from Los Angeles Valley College. Le Mat served in the Vietnam War with the U.S. Navy.

== Career ==
Le Mat starred in the pilot episode of Firehouse in 1973. In the same year, he appeared in American Graffiti, a coming-of-age film about a group of friends in Modesto, California in 1962. He played John Milner - a role that would earn him his first Golden Globe Award. Le Mat also starred in Floyd Mutrux's hit 1975 crime spree film Aloha, Bobby and Rose.

In 1977, he starred in Jonathan Demme's acclaimed comedy Citizens Band, later re-titled Handle with Care. Le Mat would reunite with Demme for 1980's Melvin and Howard, in which he played the title role of Melvin Dummar. The film was based upon the true story of a gas station attendant who claimed to be an heir of eccentric billionaire Howard Hughes, and it won two Academy Awards. Le Mat was nominated for a Golden Globe Award. In 1979, Le Mat reprised his role of John Milner in More American Graffiti.

In 1982, Le Mat played the character John Dortmunder in Jimmy the Kid, opposite Gary Coleman in the role of Jimmy. He also provided the voice of Omar in the American release of the animated film Rock & Rule. Le Mat starred in the 1985 made-for-TV movie The Burning Bed with Farrah Fawcett. The film was based on the true story of an abusive husband who drives his wife to drastic measures with his aggressive ways. Le Mat was awarded the second Golden Globe Award of his career for his role in the film. He starred in other television films such as The Night They Saved Christmas, Into the Homeland and Secret Witness. He appeared in the TV miniseries On Wings of Eagles and in the film Puppet Master.

In the 1990s, Le Mat worked on independent films and TV movies. He played Josiah Peale in Lonesome Dove: The Series and in the follow-up Lonesome Dove: The Outlaw Years. He had a small role in the 1998 film American History X. In the 2000s, Le Mat starred in the 2004 film Stateside.

== Personal life ==
Le Mat married Suzanne de Passe in 1978. The couple have three daughters. Le Mat and de Passe have since divorced.

== Filmography ==
Year	Title	Role	Notes
1973	Firehouse	Billy Dalzell	TV series; episode "Pilot"
1973	American Graffiti	John Milner	Golden Globe Award for New Star of the Year - Actor
1975	Aloha, Bobby and Rose	Bobby	
1977	Handle with Care (aka Citizen's Band)	Spider	
1979	More American Graffiti	John Milner	
1980	Melvin and Howard	Melvin Dummar	Nominated – Golden Globe Award for Best Actor – Motion Picture Musical or Comedy
1982	Death Valley	Mike	
1982	The Gift of Life	Dwayne Sutton	Television film
1982	Jimmy the Kid	John Dortmunder	
1983	Rock & Rule	Omar	Voice role, American dub
1983	Strange Invaders	Charles Bigelow	
1984	The Burning Bed	Mickey Hughes	Television film Golden Globe Award for Best Actor – Miniseries or Television Film
1984	The Night They Saved Christmas	Michael Baldwin	Television film
1986	On Wings of Eagles	Jay Coburn	TV mini-series
1986	Long Time Gone	Nick Sandusky	Television film
1987	P.K. and the Kid	Kid Kane	
1987	Deadly Nightmares	Jake Purly	TV series; episode "Doctor's Orders"
1987	The Hanoi Hilton	Earl Hubman	
1987	P.I. Private Investigations	Detective Wexler	
1987	Into the Homeland	Derrick Winston	Television film
1988	Murder, She Wrote	Carl Mattson / Luke Purdue	TV series; episode "Showdown in Saskatchewan"
1988	Secret Witness	Kurt	Television film
1988	The Twilight Zone	Tom Bennett	TV series; episode "Appointment on Route 17"
1989	Easy Wheels	Bruce	
1989	Puppet Master	Alex Whitaker	
1989	Grave Secrets	David Shaw	
1989	Veiled Threat	Jack Purcell	
1989	Blind Witness	Detective Mike Tuthill	Television film
1992	The Ray Bradbury Theater	Charlie	TV series; episode "The Jar"
1992	In the Line of Duty: Siege at Marion	Doug Bodrero	Television film
1992	Woman with a Past	Merle	Television film
1992	Wishman	Basie	
1992	Deuce Coupe	Sheriff	
1994	Caroline at Midnight	Emmet	
1994	Sensation	Mitch Snyder	
1995	Deep Down	Ray	
1995	Grace Under Fire	The Stranger	TV series; episode "Memphis Bound"
1994–1995	Lonesome Dove: The Series	Josiah Peale	TV series; 16 episodes
1995–1996	Lonesome Dove: The Outlaw Years	Josiah Peale	TV series; 14 episodes
1998	American History X	McMahon	
1999	The Outfitters	Robby	
2000	Beyond Belief: Fact or Fiction	Sheldon Ludovic	TV series; episode "Eclipse"
2001	Big Bad Love	Monroe	
2004	Stateside	Dori's Internist	
2004	The Long Shot	Guido Levits	Television film
2009	Chrome Angels	Elliot	
