= Foster Fitzsimmons =

American dancer, novelist, and teacher (1912–1991

- Born: Albert Foster Fitz-Simons; June 30, 1912; Atlanta, Georgia, U.S.
- Died: April 16, 1991 (aged 78); Raleigh, North Carolina, U.S.
- Occupations: Dancer; novelist; teacher
- Notable work: Bright Leaf (1948)

Foster Fitz-Simons (born Albert Foster Fitz-Simons June 30, 1912 – April 16, 1991) was an American dancer, novelist, and teacher.

== Life and career ==
Fitz-Simons was a member of the first all-male dance company in the US, Ted Shawn's Male Dancers. He left Ted Shawn's company to form a partnership with Miriam Winslow; they performed together for many years, appearing with the Boston, Detroit, and Toronto Symphonies as well as at the Guild Theatre in New York City and at the Rainbow Room at Rockefeller Center. They toured South America for five months in 1941.

Fitz-Simons' most notable work as a writer was his 1948 novel Bright Leaf (loosely based on the Duke family and their place in the North Carolina tobacco industry), which became a film starring Gary Cooper and Lauren Bacall in 1950. Fitz-Simons taught for many years in the Department Dramatic Art at the University of North Carolina at Chapel Hill.
