= Bright Leaf =

1950 film by Michael Curtiz

- Theatrical release poster
- Directed by: Michael Curtiz
- Screenplay by: Ranald MacDougall
- Based on: Bright Leaf by Foster Fitz-Simons
- Produced by: Henry Blanke
- Starring: Gary Cooper; Lauren Bacall; Patricia Neal
- Cinematography: Karl Freund
- Edited by: Owen Marks
- Music by: Victor Young
- Color process: Black and white
- Production company: Warner Bros. Pictures
- Distributed by: Warner Bros. Pictures
- Release date: June 16, 1950 (New York)
- Running time: 110 minutes
- Country: United States
- Language: English
- Budget: $1,944,000
- Box office: $2,446,000 $1,750,000 (US/Canada rentals)

Bright Leaf is a 1950 American romantic drama film directed by Michael Curtiz and starring Gary Cooper, Lauren Bacall and Patricia Neal. It is adapted from the 1948 novel of the same name by Foster Fitz-Simons. The title comes from the type of tobacco grown in North Carolina after the American Civil War. According to Bright Leaves, a 2003 documentary film by Ross McElwee, the plot is loosely based on the rivalry of tobacco tycoons Washington Duke and John Harvey McElwee, the filmmaker's great-grandfather.

== Plot ==
Brant Royle returns to his hometown of Kingsmont, North Carolina to settle his uncle's estate. Many years before, powerful tobacco magnate Major Singleton drove Brant and his father from town. Singleton foreclosed on the Royles because they grew the best bright leaf tobacco and because young Brant fell in love with his daughter Margaret.

When Brant stops a runaway carriage driven by Margaret, she gives him a cool reception, but he is undeterred. Bored and eager for excitement, she deliberately incites her father to confront Brant at the hotel. Inventor John Barton, needing financing for his revolutionary cigarette-rolling machine, witnesses the incident and approaches Brant.

Long ago, Brant gave his father's pocket watch to his girlfriend Sonia Kovac. Once a cigarette girl, (Note: Before the invention of machines to do the job, cigars and cigarettes were manufactured by hand, usually by women and girl children, called "cigarette girls". The title character in the opera Carmen works in such a factory. In the 1920s, in Europe and the United States, "cigarette girl" came to refer to a woman working in a speakeasy or nightclub who sold tobacco products, candy and other items from a large tray supported by a strap around her neck.) Sonia has prospered by converting her late mother's house into a high-class bordello. Brant persuades her to invest in the machine, making her a partner. Brant hires medicine show huckster Chris Malley, who becomes Brant's second in command.

Barton's invention produces cigarettes at a fraction of the cost of hand rolling, and Brant's company grows quickly. Brant returns home hours late to Sonia's birthday party and tells her his plans, blind to the fact that she loves him, and she travels to Europe.

One by one, Brant takes command of the rival businesses until only Singleton's is left. He shows Singleton that he has acquired his shares and debts, and he offers to return them as a wedding present. Margaret tells Singleton that she will marry Brant, although she does not love him, in order to save the family interests. He is appalled at her cold-blooded practicality and, blaming Brant, challenges him to a duel, but Brant refuses. Singleton shoots and slightly wounds Brant before committing suicide in disgrace.

Singleton's estate is worthless and his home is mortgaged, but Margaret refuses to sell the house. Brant visits her to say that his animosity was directed only toward her father. She warns him to stay away from her, but he replies that with him, she can have everything, and they kiss.

Barton sells his share to Brant and departs for Detroit and the fledgling automobile business. Sonia returns from Europe to a house beautifully refurbished by Malley, who proposes marriage. Sonia believes that Brant and Margaret are no longer together now that her father is dead, but Malley shows her the wedding announcement.

Margaret and Brant marry, and Sonia's wedding gift is the pocket watch. The Royles travel abroad for a year, and when they return, the business and marriage are both in trouble. Margaret refuses to share Brant's bed. (Note: It is not clear whether the marriage was ever consummated. Royle rips up a negligee that Margaret bought on their honeymoon in Paris, calling it a lie, but Margaret asks for a divorce, not an annulment.) Brant is facing accusations of monopoly. Spending lavishly, Margaret has sold off all the stock that Brant had given to her. Malley says that she has taken $2 million out of the company. Brant and Malley, who knew that Barton was behind the monopoly charges, learn that Margaret has been feeding Barton information. Brant confronts Margaret, who tells him that she has schemed to destroy him since her father died, and now she wants a divorce. He sets the house on fire accidentally but stops the firefighters, crying "Let it burn!"

On New Year's Day 1900, Brant comes to Sonia to say goodbye and to apologize. She says that she has killed the Brant Royle whom she loved. He says that Malley will handle the business, which no longer needs him. Riding out of town, he pauses to listen to his father's watch.

== Cast ==
- Gary Cooper as Brant Royle
- Lauren Bacall as Sonia Kovac
- Patricia Neal as Margaret Jane Singleton
- Jack Carson as Chris Malley, aka "Dr Monaco"
- Donald Crisp as Major Singleton
- Gladys George as Rose, one of Sonia's prostitutes
- Elizabeth Patterson as Tabitha Singleton, Margaret's older relation and companion
- Jeff Corey as John Barton
- Thurston Hall as Phillips, a tobacco grower
- Taylor Holmes as Lawyer Calhoun
- Celia Lovsky as Dressmaker (uncredited)
- Ralph Moody as Blacksmith (uncredited)
- Cleo Moore as Louise (uncredited)
- Paul Newlan as Blacksmith (uncredited)
- Edward Peil Sr. as Train Conductor (uncredited)

== Reception ==
In a contemporary review for The New York Times, critic Bosley Crowther called wrote: "There is a great deal about the tobacco business and its history which is fascinating ... the main fault of this drama, so far as flavor is concerned, is that it soon drifts away from the aura of the pungent tobacco industry and becomes just an old-fashioned conflict between a love-crazy man and a pitiless girl ... The screen play by Ranald MacDougall, from Foster Fitz-Simons' book, is a literate piece of writing, with a couple of taut dramatic scenes, but virtually every twist in it can be seen a mile away."

William Brogdon of Variety wrote: "It's overlong and tedious at times in telling its drama of the tobacco industry, love and revenge during the last decade of the 19th century. Star names provide some boxoffice help, but there's not enough good solid interest in the footage to sustain it."

Harrison's Reports wrote: "Adult in dialogue and in treatment, the picture is overlong, plot-heavy and slow-paced, and its theme of love and revenge somewhat unpleasant. The performances are uniformly good, and there are a number of individual scenes that are outstanding, but there is so much plot and counterplot that, for the most part, the drama fails to come through on the screen with telling emotional impact."

According to Warner Bros. records, the film earned $1,702,000 domestically and $744,000 foreign.

== Legacy ==
The film, one of many epic melodramas produced by Hollywood at the time, was widely forgotten after its first theatrical release in 1950. Bright Leaf gained new attention in 2003, when it played prominently in the documentary Bright Leaves by filmmaker Ross McElwee, a descendant of the man whose life was reflected in both the novel and film.
