= Blind Witness (film) =

1989 American made-for-television film

- Genre: Drama; Thriller
- Written by: Tom Sullivan; Edmond Stevens; Robert Carrington
- Directed by: Richard A. Colla
- Starring: Victoria Principal; Paul Le Mat; Stephen Macht
- Theme music composer: Bob Alcivar
- Country of origin: United States
- Original language: English

Production
- Executive producer: Hans Proppe
- Producer: Richard A. Colla
- Production location: Utah
- Cinematography: Larry Pizer
- Editors: Bob Kagey; Robert L. Kimble
- Running time: 93 minutes
- Production companies: King Phoenix Entertainment; Shadowplay Films

Original release
- Network: ABC
- Release: November 26, 1989

Blind Witness is a 1989 American made-for-television thriller drama film starring Victoria Principal, Paul Le Mat and Stephen Macht. It was set and filmed in Salt Lake City, Utah and broadcast on ABC on November 26, 1989.

== Plot ==
Maggie Kemlich is a blind woman who leads an active, independent life despite her disability. Maggie witnesses robbers murder her husband, Gordon, using a stun gun. However, except for Det. Mike Tuthill, police dismiss her observations because she is blind. Police arrest the men who they believe committed the murder, but Maggie goes public with the fact that she believes they have the wrong men, prompting the murderers to come after her. She then seeks out to identify the true killers, and sets up a trap to enact revenge.

Det. Mike Tuthill shows up at Maggie's loft to check on her, but Maggie knocks him unconscious, believing him to be one of the killers. The killers show up at Maggie's loft shortly thereafter, and she traps them in the elevator, temporarily blinds them using high intensity camera lights, and shocks them with a stun gun. One of the killers, Remy, escapes the elevator and attacks Maggie, but she shoots him using Det. Tuthill's gun. Still alive, Remy tricks Maggie into wasting bullets by throwing items in various directions. Det. Tuthill regains consciousness and fights Remy, but Remy pins him to the ground and chokes him with a pipe. Tuthill tells Maggie that the killer is on top of him and to shoot. Maggie hesitates, fearing that she will hit Tuthill, but does shoot, hitting Remy and killing him.

== Cast ==
- Victoria Principal ... Maggie Kemlich
- Paul Le Mat ... Det. Mike Tuthill
- Stephen Macht ... Gordon Kemlich
- Matt Clark ... Lt. Schapper
- Tim Choate ... Remy
- Marcia Reider ... Joanna
- Jeff Olson ... D.J.
- Jesse Bennett ... Langevine
- Dennis Saylor ... Dickie
- Russ McGinn ... Contractor
- Donré Sampson ... Don Lambert
- Jayne Luke ... Dr. Gilroy
- Will C. Hazlett ... Lab Detective
- Joshua Devane ... Wiggins
- J. Omar Hansen ... Lab Cop
