= Sherman's March (1986 film) =

1986 film by Ross McElwee

- DVD cover
- Directed by: Ross McElwee
- Written by: Ross McElwee
- Produced by: Ross McElwee
- Starring: Ross McElwee
- Narrated by: Ross McElwee
- Cinematography: Ross McElwee
- Distributed by: First Run Features
- Release date: September 5, 1986
- Running time: 155 minutes
- Language: English
- Box office: $124,141

Sherman's March: A Meditation on the Possibility of Romantic Love In the South During an Era of Nuclear Weapons Proliferation is a 1986 cinéma vérité documentary film written and directed by Ross McElwee. It was awarded a Grand Jury prize at the 1987 Sundance Film Festival, and was selected for preservation in the U.S. National Film Registry in 2000.

== Background ==
McElwee initially planned to make a film about the effects of General William Tecumseh Sherman's Civil War campaign through Georgia and the Carolinas, the Georgia portion of which is commonly called his "March to the Sea". A romantic breakup that the director experienced before filming made it difficult for him to separate personal from professional concerns, however, shifting his focus to create a more personal story about the women in his life, romance, and religion. Other themes include the threat of nuclear war amidst the Cold War and the legacy and complexity of Sherman's own life.

The film follows a repetitive narrative pattern: McElwee becomes enamored with various women, eventually developing feelings for each of his subjects, only to have his romantic hopes dashed. McElwee stated the film is a personal essay blending fiction and nonfiction.

== Production ==
McElwee called his previous film Backyard "a sketch for Sherman's March, an experiment in how I could approach the bigger film". He called the former film "cruder" because

I was just learning to shoot as a one-person crew. I was just getting over that odd sense of camera shyness in reverse. It takes a while to summon the gumption to shoot people you know well, to be able to face them and talk to them as you're filming. Also, I was using a Nagra 4, a very large tape recorder: it weighs 20 pounds [9.1 kg] and I carried it slung over my shoulder. For Sherman's March, I used a miniature Nagra SN, a very highly developed piece of recording equipment that could fit on my belt. This technological improvement made shooting much easier.

Initially, McElwee thought the film would be a "synthesis of Backyard and Space Coast," but the day after filming the Scottish games, his sister

said—somewhat seriously, somewhat joking—"You should use the camera as a way to meet women." She's sincerely upset about my having ended my relationship with my girlfriend, and she's looking for ways to get me back on my feet. ... [A]t the point when she gave me her advice about how to use the camera, I experienced a minor epiphany.

McElwee set out to film Sherman's March with just a $9,000 grant (equivalent to $26,942 in 2025), and began conducting mostly impromptu interviews. "Pretty much I always walked in on them," he said, characterizing his methods. "I guess what my conversations have that conventional interviews don't is a serendipitous quality, and emotional charge that has something to do with the personal connection between the subject and the film-maker. I never came with a list of questions." The film ultimately cost $75,000 (equivalent to $224,513 in 2025) to complete.

Principal photography lasted about five months, and McElwee estimated that he shot about 25 hours of footage:

I was almost always ready to shoot. I kept the camera within reaching distance, sometimes balanced on my shoulder ... Even between major portraits, when I was on the road, I was totally open to filming whatever might happen in a gas station or in a restaurant, or wherever. So in one sense you can count all that time as "filming time."

== Reception ==
In 1985, Jay Carr of The Boston Globe called McElwee a "Tarheel Woody Allen" and the film "like a series of variations on loneliness, funny and sad" but "never self-pitying," "sustain[ing] its loopy absurdist tone, reveling in the post-Civil War ironies of the misunderstood Sherman, identifying with them."

In a New York Times "Critics' Pick" review of the documentary, Vincent Canby called McElwee a "film maker-anthropologist with a rare appreciation for the eccentric details of our edgy civilization," and the film both "a timely memoir of the 80's" and "a very cheerful recollection of the kind of self-searching, home-movie documentaries that Jim McBride, the director, and L. M. Kit Carson, the writer and actor, satirized so brilliantly in their fiction film, David Holzman's Diary.

In 1994, McElwee told MovieMaker Magazine's Paula Hunt:

The distributor of First Run Features saw Sherman's March at the IFP (the Independent Feature Project) in New York and immediately said he'd take it. I wanted to shop around a bit, because it's a very small company and I wanted to see what else was available. I got turned down by every other middle-range distributor. I didn't even bother to go to the studios or the major distribution outlets. First Run Features was the only company willing to take a chance on it and, in fact, it did terrifically well. According to their statistics, until Strangers in Good Company came along it was their top-grossing film. It's supposed to be the tenth-highest grossing feature documentary of all time. Isn't that incredible? I could never have imagined it being that kind of a film.

Scott MacDonald wrote in his introduction to a summer 1988 Film Quarterly interview with McElwee:

We get to know McElwee's (or McElwee's filmic persona's) hopes, concerns, nightmares; and we are behind the camera with McElwee as he uses the film-making process to forge new relationships and to revise previously important relationships. As is true in many literary first-person narratives, McElwee's approach in Sherman's March is simultaneously very revealing and somewhat mysterious: the candidness of the scenes is frequently startling, but the more the film — and McElwee-as-narrator — reveals, the more we realize that there are many aspects of the relationships he is recording that we are not privy to. We cannot help but wonder about the narrator as we experience things with him.

Paul Attanasio wrote that the "richness of Sherman's March comes from the way McElwee, in his roundabout way, completes the portrait of Sherman he originally set out to achieve", but considered it too long, especially given its poor technical quality.

=== Accolades ===
Sherman's March was awarded the Grand Jury prize in the documentary category at the 1987 Sundance Film Festival. In 2000, the Library of Congress deemed the film "culturally, historically, or aesthetically significant" and selected it for preservation in the National Film Registry, calling it a "hilarious, one-of-a-kind romantic exploration of the South."

== Legacy ==
A 1998 review in The Austin Chronicle proclaims McElwee "a modern master of cinéma vérité — rough, real-life documentary filmmaking that seeks to expose a subject's soul through its very lack of polish. In McElwee's case, that subject is almost always himself. Insistently personal, always autobiographical, occasionally exploitative, watching McElwee is like watching someone's (well-financed) home videos."

In April 2004, Slant magazine, reviewing the film's then-newly released DVD, gave it three stars out of five, saying that it "looks and sounds like its [sic] from 1986, but no amount of dirt and noise (and there's some here and there) can diffuse any of the film's magic."

Sherman's March influenced the 2022 film Everything Everywhere All At Once by Daniels, particularly its exploration of the concept of modal realism.

== See also ==
- List of films and television shows about the American Civil War

Awards
Preceded by Private Conversations	Sundance Grand Jury Prize: Documentary; 1987	Succeeded by Beirut: The Last Home Movie
