= Mary Steenburgen =

American actress (born 1953)

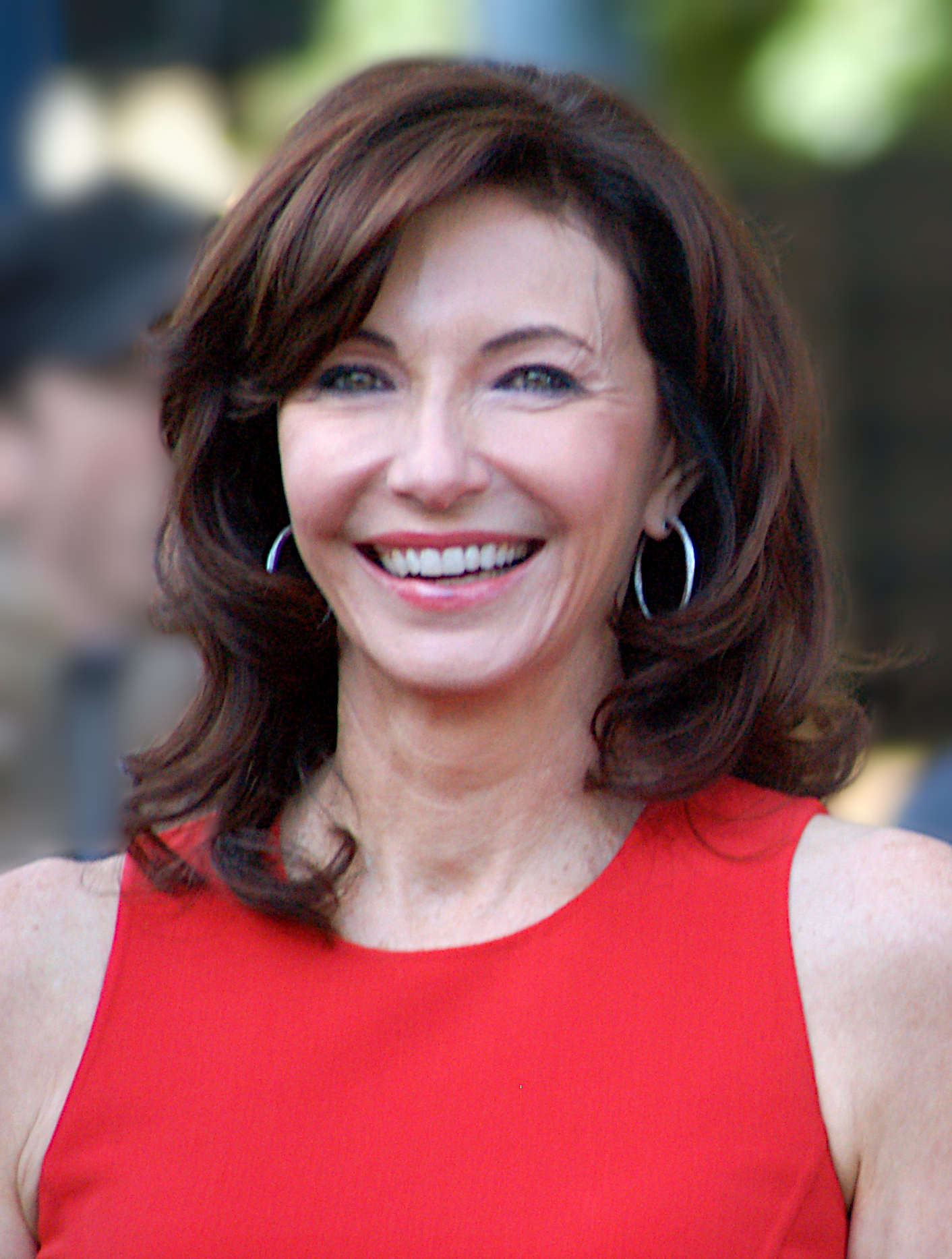
- Steenburgen in 2009
- Born: Mary Nell Steenburgen; February 8, 1953 (age 73); Newport, Arkansas, U.S.
- Education: Hendrix College; Neighborhood Playhouse School of the Theatre
- Occupations: Actress; comedian; singer; songwriter
- Years active: 1978–present
- Known for: Melvin and Howard; Ragtime; Back to the Future Part III
- Spouses: Malcolm McDowell (m. 1980; div. 1990); Ted Danson (m. 1995)
- Children: 2, including Charlie McDowell
- Relatives: Lily Collins (daughter-in-law)
- Awards: Academy Award for Best Supporting Actress; Golden Globe Award for Best Supporting Actress in a Motion Picture

Mary Nell Steenburgen (/ˈstiːnˌbɜːrdʒən/; born February 8, 1953) is an American actress, comedian, singer, and songwriter. After studying at New York's Neighborhood Playhouse in the 1970s, she made her professional acting debut in the Western comedy film Goin' South (1978). Steenburgen went on to earn critical acclaim for her role in Time After Time (1979) and Jonathan Demme's comedy-drama film Melvin and Howard (1980), for which she received the Golden Globe Award for Best Supporting Actress – Motion Picture and the Academy Award for Best Supporting Actress.

Steenburgen received a Golden Globe Award nomination for Miloš Forman's drama film Ragtime (1981). Her other films include A Midsummer Night's Sex Comedy (1982), Cross Creek (1983), Back to the Future Part III (1990), What's Eating Gilbert Grape (1993), Philadelphia (1993), Nixon (1995), The Brave One (2007), Last Vegas (2013), A Walk in the Woods (2015), Book Club (2018), Nightmare Alley (2021), and Book Club: The Next Chapter (2023). She also played mothers in a string of comedy films including Parenthood (1989), Elf (2003), Step Brothers (2008), Four Christmases (2008), The Proposal (2009), Did You Hear About the Morgans? (2009), The Help (2011), and Happiest Season (2020).

She received nominations for a BAFTA TV Award for the miniseries Tender Is the Night (1985) and a Primetime Emmy Award for the television film The Attic: The Hiding of Anne Frank (1988). Steenburgen has worked as a singer-songwriter for numerous films, in some of which she starred. For her song "Glasgow (No Place Like Home)", written for the musical film Wild Rose (2018), she received the Critics' Choice Movie Award for Best Song. Steenburgen was awarded with Bob Hope Humanitarian Award in 2025.

== Early life and education ==
Mary Nell Steenburgen was born on February 8, 1953, in Newport, Arkansas, to Nellie Mae (née Wall), a school-board secretary, and Maurice Hoffman Steenburgen, a freight-train conductor who worked for the Missouri Pacific Railroad.

In 1971, she enrolled at Hendrix College to study drama. She subsequently traveled to Dallas at the suggestion of her drama teacher, where she successfully auditioned for New York City's Neighborhood Playhouse School of the Theatre.

== Career ==
Steenburgen moved to Manhattan in 1972 after the Neighborhood Playhouse offered her an opportunity to study acting. She worked as a server at The Magic Pan and for Doubleday while studying under William Esper.

=== Film career ===
Steenburgen's break came when she was discovered by Jack Nicholson in the reception room of Paramount Pictures's New York office and was cast as the female lead in his second directorial work, the Western comedy Goin' South (1978). Steenburgen had a leading role in the film Time After Time (1979), for which she won the Saturn Award for Best Actress. She played a modern woman who falls in love with author H. G. Wells, played by Malcolm McDowell, whom she married the following year.

In her third film, she won the Academy Award for Best Supporting Actress for the film Melvin and Howard (1980). She played Lynda Dummar, the wife of Melvin Dummar, a trucker and aspiring singer who claimed to have befriended reclusive eccentric Howard Hughes. Another notable film appearance came in the well-received film Cross Creek (1983), in which she portrayed Marjorie Kinnan Rawlings, author of The Yearling. In 1985, she starred in the film One Magic Christmas as someone who falls on devastating times at Christmas, only to rely on a miracle to save her family. In 1989, she played Karen Buckman in Parenthood. In Back to the Future Part III (1990), Steenburgen played Clara Clayton, a schoolteacher who falls in love with Doc Brown. She was persuaded to play the role by her children, as well as by fans of the Back to the Future films, and reprised the role by providing the character's voice in Back to the Future: The Animated Series.

Other performances have been in What's Eating Gilbert Grape (1993), as a woman who is having an affair with the title character; My Summer Story (1994), as the mother of Ralphie Parker (the sequel to A Christmas Story); the role of Hannah Milhous Nixon in the Oliver Stone biopic Nixon (1995); and the Will Ferrell comedy Elf (2003), as a woman who discovers that her husband is the father of one of Santa's elves.

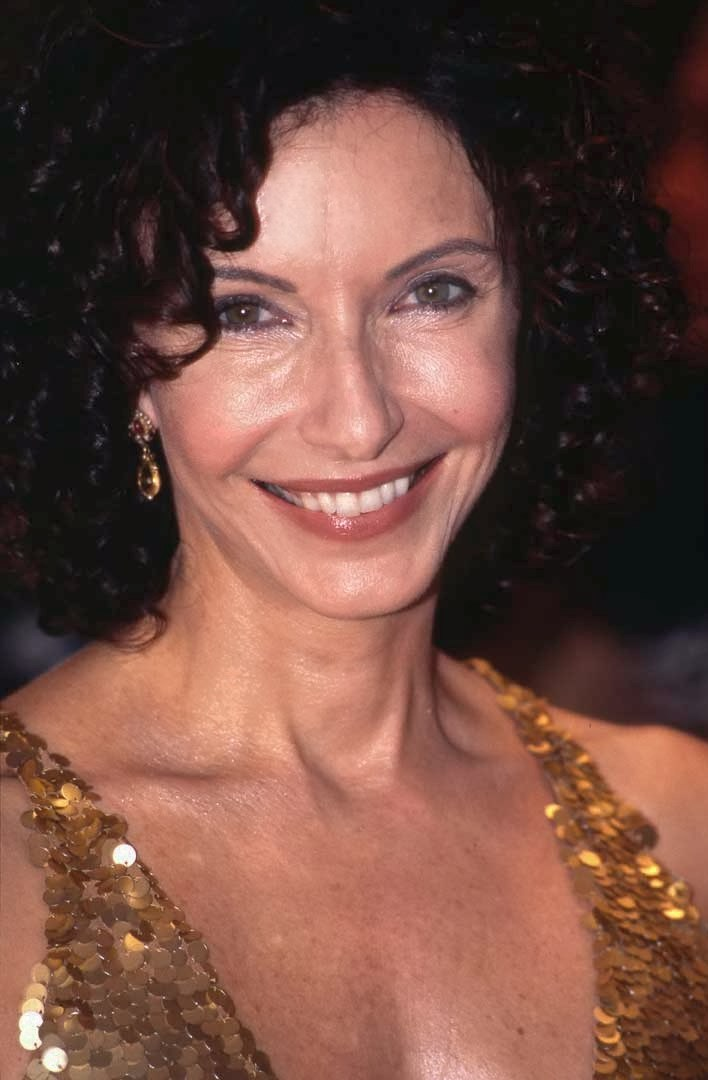
Steenburgen in Toronto Film Festival 2001

She has appeared in the comedy films Step Brothers (2008), playing the mother of Will Ferrell's character; Four Christmases (2008); and The Proposal (2009). Dirty Girl, which featured Steenburgen, premiered at the Toronto International Film Festival on September 12, 2010. She also appeared in the critically acclaimed film The Help (2011) and had a featured role as a lounge singer, who is the romantic interest in a love triangle, in the comedy film Last Vegas (2013). She had a small role in the comedy-drama film A Walk in the Woods as Jeannie. In 2018, Steenburgen starred with Diane Keaton, Jane Fonda and Candice Bergen in the romantic comedy film Book Club.

=== Television career ===
In television, Steenburgen appeared as Kate Montgomery in Ink (1996) and co-starred as Mary Gulliver in Gulliver's Travels (1996). She has a recurring role as herself in Curb Your Enthusiasm. Steenburgen co-starred as Helen Girardi, the mother of Amber Tamblyn's title character in Joan of Arcadia. In 2011, she had a recurring role as Josephine in the HBO sitcom Bored to Death. Steenburgen starred as Anastasia Lee in the 2011 FX pilot Outlaw Country, but it was passed by the network. She appeared in the dark sitcom Wilfred from 2011 through 2013 as Catherine Newman, the title character's eccentric and mentally ill mother. Steenburgen had a recurring role as Diana Jessup on the NBC sitcom 30 Rock from 2012 to 2013.

In 2014, she began a recurring role as former Dixie Mafia boss Katherine Hale in the fifth and sixth seasons of Justified.

From 2015 to 2018, she starred as Gail Klosterman on the comedy series The Last Man on Earth.

From 2020 to 2021, she played the role of Maggie Clarke in the NBC musical comedy-drama series Zoey's Extraordinary Playlist for two seasons. She reprised the role for The Roku Channel television film Zoey's Extraordinary Christmas.

In 2025, she appeared with her husband, Ted Danson, in the second season of the Netflix show A Man on the Inside as the character Mona Margadoff.

=== Music career ===
In 2007, Steenburgen underwent minor surgery on her arm, which required a general anaesthetic; shortly thereafter, she began experiencing "music (...) playing in her head day and night". She subsequently took music lessons so that she could write down what she was hearing, and by 2013 had almost 50 songwriting credits. She has collaborated with musicians from Nashville and was also signed to Universal Music Group as a songwriter. She performs one of her own songs in Last Vegas.

In 2018, her composition "Glasgow (No Place Like Home)" as performed by Jessie Buckley featured as the climactic musical moment in the film Wild Rose and won Steenburgen several awards, including the 2019 Critics' Choice Movie Award for Best Song. On October 30, 2020, Steenburgen signed a global publishing deal with Universal Music Publishing Group.

== Other activities ==
Steenburgen was a co-founder of Artists for a Free South Africa (later renamed Artists for a New South Africa) in 1989, along with a number of other Hollywood actors, including Alfre Woodard.

In September 2005, she and her husband Ted Danson gave a guest lecture for students at the Clinton School of Public Service, where they discussed their roles in public service as well as the foundations and causes in which they are involved.

Steenburgen is a friend of former senator and Secretary of State Hillary Clinton and supported, with Danson, Clinton's 2008 presidential campaign. She spoke at the 2016 Democratic National Convention. Steenburgen is involved with various groups ranging from human rights to environmental causes.

=== Honours ===
An alumna of Hendrix College, Steenburgen received an honorary doctorate from the institution in 1989. In 2006, Steenburgen received an honorary Doctor of Humane Letters degree from Lyon College in Batesville, Arkansas.

== Personal life ==
In 1978, Steenburgen met and began dating actor Malcolm McDowell while they were co-starring in Time After Time. They married and had two children together, including film director/screenwriter Charlie McDowell. They divorced in 1990. On October 7, 1995, Steenburgen married actor Ted Danson, whom she had met on the set of the film Pontiac Moon, and became the stepmother to Danson's two daughters from his previous marriage.

Since 2014, Steenburgen's son Charlie McDowell has had a running joke at her expense, claiming on numerous occasions on social media that his mother is actress Andie MacDowell.

== Acting credits ==
=== Film ===
Year	Title	Role	Notes
1978	Goin' South	Julia Tate Moon	
1979	Time After Time	Amy Robbins	
1980	Melvin and Howard	Lynda West Dummar	
1981	Ragtime	Mother	
1982	A Midsummer Night's Sex Comedy	Adrian	
1983	Cross Creek	Marjorie Kinnan Rawlings	
1983	Romantic Comedy	Phoebe Craddock	
1985	One Magic Christmas	Ginny Grainger	
1987	Dead of Winter	Julie Rose / Katie McGovern / Evelyn	
1987	The Whales of August	Young Sarah	
1987	End of the Line	Rose Pickett	
1989	Miss Firecracker	Elaine Rutledge	
1989	Parenthood	Karen Buckman	
1990	Back to the Future Part III	Clara Clayton	
1990	The Long Walk Home	Narrator	Voice role
1991	The Butcher's Wife	Stella Keefover	
1993	What's Eating Gilbert Grape	Betty Carver	
1993	Philadelphia	Belinda Conine	
1994	Clifford	Sarah Davis Daniels	
1994	Pontiac Moon	Katherine Bellamy	
1994	It Runs in the Family	Mrs. Parker (mother)	
1995	My Family	Gloria	
1995	The Grass Harp	Sister Ida	
1995	Powder	Jessie Caldwell	
1995	Nixon	Hannah Milhous Nixon	
2001	Nobody's Baby	Estelle	
2001	The Trumpet of the Swan	Mother	Voice role
2001	Life as a House	Colleen Beck	
2001	I Am Sam	Dr. Blake	
2002	Sunshine State	Francine Pinkney	
2002	Mrs. Pilgrim Goes to Hollywood	Mary	
2002	Wish You Were Dead	Sally Rider	
2003	Hope Springs	Joanie Fisher	
2003	Casa de los Babys	Gayle	
2003	Elf	Emily Hobbs	
2005	Marilyn Hotchkiss' Ballroom Dancing & Charm School	Marienne Hotchkiss	
2006	The Dead Girl	Leah's mother	
2006	Inland Empire	Visitor No. 2	
2007	Elvis and Anabelle	Geneva	
2007	Nobel Son	Sarah Michaelson	
2007	Numb	Dr. Blaine	
2007	The Brave One	Carol	
2007	Honeydripper	Amanda Winship	
2008	Step Brothers	Nancy Huff	
2008	Four Christmases	Marilyn	
2009	American Outrage	Narrator	Documentary film
2009	In the Electric Mist	Bootsie Robicheaux	
2009	The Proposal	Grace Paxton	
2009	The Open Road	Katherine	
2009	Did You Hear About the Morgans?	Emma Wheeler	
2010	Dirty Girl	Peggy	
2011	Keepin' It Real Estate	Claire	Short film
2011	The Help	Elaine Stein	
2013	Last Vegas	Diana Boyle	
2013	Brahmin Bulls	Helen West	
2013	The Tale of the Princess Kaguya	The Bamboo Cutter's Wife	Voice role
2014	Song One	Karen	
2015	A Walk in the Woods	Jeannie	
2016	The Book of Love	Julia	
2016	Dean	Carol	
2016	Katie Says Goodbye	Maybelle	
2017	The Discovery	Interviewer	
2017	I Do... Until I Don't	Cybil Burger	
2018	Book Club	Carol	
2018	Antiquities	Dr. Margot	
2019	Flannery	Narrator	Voice role
2020	Happiest Season	Tipper Caldwell	
2021	Nightmare Alley	Mrs. Kimball	
2023	Book Club: The Next Chapter	Carol	
2025	Bulldozer	Cathy	Short film
2025	Easy's Waltz	TBA	2025 Toronto International Film Festival feature
2025	Last Train to Fortune	TBA	2025 Ojai Film Festival feature
2026	The Dink	Candace	
2026	Let's Have Kids!	Sue	

=== Television ===
Year	Title	Role	Notes
1983	Faerie Tale Theatre	Mary / Little Red Riding Hood	Episode: "Little Red Riding Hood"
1985	Tender Is the Night	Nicole Warren Diver	Miniseries
1988	The Attic: The Hiding of Anne Frank	Miep Gies	TV movie
1991–1992	Back to the Future	Clara Clayton	Main cast, voice role
1994	The Gift	Catherine	TV short film
1995	Frasier	Marjorie	Voice role, episode: "Retirement Is Murder"
1996	Gulliver's Travels	Mary Gulliver	Miniseries, main cast
1996–1997	Ink	Kate Montgomery	Main cast
1998	About Sarah	Sarah Elizabeth McCaffrey	TV movie
1999	Noah's Ark	Naamah	Miniseries
2000	Picnic	Rosemary Sydney	TV movie
2000–2017	Curb Your Enthusiasm	Mary Steenburgen	6 episodes
2002	Living with the Dead	Detective Karen Condrin	TV movie
2002	Law & Order: Special Victims Unit	Grace Rinato	Episode: "Denial"
2003–2005	Joan of Arcadia	Helen Girardi	Main cast
2004	Becker	Patient	Episode: "DNR"
2004	It Must Be Love	Clem Gazelle	TV movie
2004	Capital City	Elaine Summer	TV movie
2007	Reinventing the Wheelers	Claire Wheeler	TV movie
2009	Happiness Isn't Everything	Audrey Veil	TV movie
2010	Southern Discomfort	Mary Lou Dobson	TV movie
2011–2013	Wilfred	Catherine Newman	4 episodes
2011	Robot Chicken	Athena	Voice role, episode: "The Core, the Thief, His Wife and Her Lover"
2011	Bored to Death	Josephine	Main cast (season 3)
2012	30 Rock	Diana Jessup	5 episodes
2012	Outlaw Country	Anastasia Lee	TV movie
2014–2015	Justified	Katherine Hale	Recurring role (seasons 5–6)
2015	Togetherness	Linda	2 episodes
2015–2017	Orange Is the New Black	Delia Powell	6 episodes
2015–2018	The Last Man on Earth	Gail Klosterman	Main cast
2015	7 Days in Hell	Louisa Pool	TV movie
2015	Turkey Hollow	Aunt Cly	TV movie
2016	Blunt Talk	Margaret Rudolph	4 episodes
2017	Finding Your Roots	Herself	Episode: "Puritans and Pioneers"
2018	The Conners	Marcy Bellinger	Episode: "Keep on Truckin'"
2019–2021	Bless the Harts	Crystalynn Poole	Recurring role, voice role
2019	On Becoming a God in Central Florida	Ellen Joy Bonar	5 episodes
2020–2021	Zoey's Extraordinary Playlist	Maggie Clarke	Main cast
2020	Grace and Frankie	Miriam	2 episodes
2020	The Good Place	Music Teacher	Episode: "Whenever You're Ready"
2021	Zoey's Extraordinary Christmas	Maggie Clarke	TV movie
2022	Mr. Mayor	Adriana	Episode: "Murder in the Old West"
2025	A Man on the Inside	Mona Margadoff	Main cast (season 2)
2026	American Dad!	Dr. Fay	Voice role, episode: "The Flume Flume Room"

=== Theater ===
Year	Title	Role	Notes
1992	Candida	Candida	Roundabout Theatre Company, Broadway

== Awards and nominations ==
Year	Association	Category	Work	Result
1978	Golden Globe Awards	New Star of the Year – Actress	Goin' South	Nominated
1979	Saturn Awards	Best Actress	Time After Time	Won
1980	Academy Awards	Best Supporting Actress	Melvin and Howard	Won
1980	Boston Society of Film Critics	Best Supporting Actress	Melvin and Howard	Won
1980	Golden Globe Awards	Best Supporting Actress – Motion Picture	Melvin and Howard	Won
1980	Los Angeles Film Critics Association	Best Supporting Actress	Melvin and Howard	Won
1980	National Society of Film Critics Awards	Best Supporting Actress	Melvin and Howard	Won
1980	New York Film Critics Circle	Best Supporting Actress	Melvin and Howard	Won
1981	Golden Globe Awards	Best Supporting Actress – Motion Picture	Ragtime	Nominated
1985	Genie Awards	Actress in a Leading Role	One Magic Christmas	Nominated
1985	British Academy Television Awards	Best Actress	Tender Is the Night	Nominated
1988	Primetime Emmy Awards	Outstanding Lead Actress – Miniseries or a Movie	The Attic: The Hiding of Anne Frank	Nominated
1989	Chicago Film Critics Association	Best Supporting Actress	Miss Firecracker	Nominated
1990	Saturn Awards	Best Supporting Actress	Back to the Future Part III	Nominated
1995	Screen Actors Guild	Outstanding Performance by a Cast in a Motion Picture	Nixon	Nominated
1998	Screen Actors Guild	Outstanding Performance by a Female Actor in a Miniseries or Television Movie	About Sarah	Nominated
2004	Satellite Awards	Best Supporting Actress – Television Series	Joan of Arcadia	Won
2011	Screen Actors Guild	Outstanding Performance by a Cast in a Motion Picture	The Help	Won
2019	Critics' Choice Movie Awards	Best Song	Wild Rose for "Glasgow (No Place Like Home)"	Won (Note: Tied with Elton John and Bernie Taupin for "(I'm Gonna) Love Me Again" from Rocketman)
2019	Hollywood Critics Association	Best Original Song	Wild Rose for "Glasgow (No Place Like Home)"	Won
2019	Houston Film Critics Society	Best Original Song	Wild Rose for "Glasgow (No Place Like Home)"	Won
2025	Academy of Television Arts & Sciences	Bob Hope Humanitarian Award	—N/a	Honored

In addition to these recognitions, Steenburgen received the 1,337th star on the Hollywood Walk of Fame on December 16, 2009.
