= Charleen =

1978 film by Ross McElwee

- Directed by: Ross McElwee
- Written by: Ross McElwee
- Release date: 1978
- Running time: 54 minutes
- Language: English

Charleen is a 1978 observational documentary film directed and shot by Ross McElwee, about his friend and former poetry teacher, Charleen Swansea.

== Summary ==
McElwee follows Charleen over a month in her life in North Carolina, where she still teaches poetry, and documents her friendship with American poet Ezra Pound.

== Production ==
McElwee shot the film as part of his graduate thesis at MIT.
