= News at One =

News at One may refer to:

- BBC News at One, on BBC One and the BBC News channel
- RTÉ News at One, on RTÉ Radio 1
- ITV Lunchtime News, previously ITV News at 1.30 and News at One
- The Live Desk (Sky), previously Sky News at One
