= Melvin Dummar =

American falsified beneficiary (1944–2018)

- Born: Melvin Earl Dummar; August 28, 1944; Cedar City, Utah, United States
- Died: December 9, 2018 (aged 74); Pahrump, Nevada, United States
- Spouses: Linda J. West (m. 1964; div. 1967) Bonnie A. Bonneau (m. 1973)

Melvin Earl Dummar (August 28, 1944 – December 9, 2018) was a Utah man who gained attention when he claimed to have saved reclusive business tycoon Howard Hughes in the Nevada desert in 1967, and to have been awarded part of Hughes' vast estate. Dummar's claims resulted in a series of court battles that all ended in rulings against Dummar. A Las Vegas jury determined in 1978 that the will, leaving Dummar $156 million, was a forgery. Dummar's story was later adapted into Jonathan Demme's film Melvin and Howard in 1980, in which he was portrayed by actor Paul Le Mat. A 2005 reinvestigation of the circumstances surrounding the so-called Dummar Will yielded new evidence not previously known, which was argued to bolster Dummar's claims.

== The "Mormon Will" ==
After Hughes' death in April 1976, a handwritten will was discovered in the Salt Lake City, Utah, headquarters of The Church of Jesus Christ of Latter-day Saints. Though purportedly written by Hughes in 1968, the will had many strange discrepancies. It named Noah Dietrich as an executor, despite the fact that Dietrich had left Hughes' employ on bad terms in the late 1950s. The will left approximately $156 million to The Church of Jesus Christ of Latter-day Saints; although Hughes had employed many LDS workers, he had never been a member of that church. The will also left money to his two ex-wives, Ella Rice and Jean Peters, even though both women had alimony settlements that barred claims on Hughes' estate. The document contained numerous spelling errors, including the incorrect rendering of the name of Hughes’ cousin. It also referred to Hughes’ renowned flying boat, the Hughes H-4 Hercules, by the nickname “Spruce Goose,” a term Hughes reportedly disliked. In addition, Dummar’s name appeared as “Melvin DuMar of Gabbs, Nevada,” and he was designated to receive one-sixteenth of Hughes’ estate. The presence of these errors, particularly the misspelling of Dummar’s name, has been cited by some observers as lending a measure of credibility to his claims.

=== Text of the "Mormon Will" ===
The text (including mistakes) of the handwritten document, known as the "Mormon Will":

Last Will and Testament
I, Howard R. Hughes, being of sound mind and disposing mind and memory, not acting under duress, fraud or the undue influence of any person whomever, and being a resident of Las Vegas, Nevada, declare that this is to be my last will and revolt [sic] all other wills previously made by me -
After my death, my estate is to be devided [sic] as follows -
First: one-forth [sic] of all my assets to go to Hughes Medical Institute of Miami -
Second: one-eight of assets to be devided among the University of Texas - Rice Institute of Technology of Houston - the University of Nevada - and the University of California.
Third: one-sixteenth to Church of Jesus Christ of Latter-day Saints - David O. McKay - Pre.
Forth: one-sixteenth to establish a home for Orphan Children -
Fifth: one-sixteenth of assets to go to Boy Scouts of America.
Sixth: one-sixteenth to be devided among Jean Peters of Los Angeles and Ella Rice of Houston -
Seventh: one-sixteenth of assets to William R. Lommis of Houston, Texas -
Eighth: one-sixteenth to go to Melvin DuMar of Gabbs, Nevada -
Ninth: one-sixteenth to be devided among my personal aids at the time of my death -
Tenth: one-sixteenth to be used as school scholarship fund for entire country - the spruce goose is to be given to the City of Long Beach, Calif.
The remainder of my estate is to be devided among the key men of the company's [sic] I own at the time of my death.
I appoint Noah Dietrich as the executer [sic] of this will -
Signed the 19 day of March 1968
Howard R. Hughes

=== 1978 probate trial of the "Mormon Will" ===
Dummar (whose inheritance would have been $156 million) originally claimed that he knew nothing about the will and told a story about meeting Hughes: while working at a service station in Willard, Utah, he discovered a disheveled and lost man lying on the side of a stretch of U.S. Route 95 about 150 miles (240 km) north of Las Vegas, Nevada, near Lida Junction. The man asked Dummar to take him to the Sands Hotel in Las Vegas. Dummar claimed that only in the final minutes of their encounter did the man reveal his identity as Hughes.

Afterward, when authorities discovered Dummar's fingerprint on the envelope, he said that a well-dressed man had left the will in a sealed envelope at Dummar's service station. An enclosed note, Dummar claimed, instructed him to deliver the will to the headquarters of The Church of Jesus Christ of Latter-day Saints, which had also been left 1/16 of the estate.

An investigation revealed that Dummar's wife Bonnie Dummar had worked for a magazine called Millionaire that was distributed to wealthy Americans, and that her job had allowed her access to Hughes' memos and Hughes' signature. However, Bonnie denied forging the will.

The document, which became known as the "Mormon Will", was ruled a forgery by a Nevada jury in June 1978. Dummar received no portion of Hughes' estate, but no criminal charges were filed against him or his wife.

=== 2005 investigation by FBI agent Gary Magnesen ===
In early 2005, retired FBI agent Gary Magnesen claimed to have found new evidence supporting Dummar's story. Magnesen stated that Hughes' closest employees remembered him entering the Sands Hotel early one morning in December 1967 and stating that he had been picked up by Dummar in the desert. Furthermore, Hughes had purchased interests in mines located near the area where Dummar said he found him, and had frequented a brothel near where Dummar said he'd first encountered Hughes, which he was allegedly flown out to by pilot Robert Deiro. Magnesen documented his findings in his 2005 book, The Investigation: A Former FBI Agent Uncovers the Truth Behind Howard Hughes, Melvin Dummar, and the Most Contested Will in American History. However, some of Magnesen's claims were disputed by Hughes' former bodyguard Gordon Margulis, who asserted that "from 1966 to 1970 ... [Hughes] never left his room at the Desert Inn", and that "if Hughes had wanted hookers he did not have to fly to brothels to get them because Las Vegas was not exactly short of them." George Parnum, one of Dummar's former attorneys, stated that "if there was a flight to a brothel at the time leading up to the trial, he couldn't find a record of it".

Dummar was interviewed for one hour on live radio in 2005 about Magnesen's book by Steven Rinehart. In this interview, he related again what he claims happened in 1967 and affirmed an intention to seek to reopen the case.

=== 2006 suit against Lummis and Gay ===
On June 12, 2006, Dummar filed suit in the United States district court for Utah against William Lummis, the primary beneficiary of the Hughes estate, and Frank Gay, the former chief operating officer of a number of Hughes entities, claiming that the two had conspired to defraud Dummar out of his rightful share of the Hughes estate by presenting perjured testimony and concealing evidence in the 1978 trial. Dummar's complaint demanded the $156 million he would have received from the estate, as well as punitive damages and interest.

On January 9, 2007, U.S. District Judge Bruce Sterling Jenkins dismissed Dummar's lawsuit, stating that Dummar's claims had been “fully and fairly litigated” in Las Vegas in 1978 when a jury decided the purported will was invalid.
