= Six O'Clock News (film) =

- Six O'Clock News VHS cover
- Directed by: Ross McElwee
- Written by: Ross McElwee
- Produced by: David Fanning; Ross McElwee; Robin Parmelee; Michael Sullivan
- Starring: Ross McElwee; Charleen Swansea; Yung Su An
- Cinematography: Ross McElwee
- Edited by: Ross McElwee
- Distributed by: First Run Features
- Release date: November 4, 1996
- Running time: 103 minutes
- Country: United States
- Language: English

Six O'Clock News is a 1996 documentary film by Ross McElwee about television news in the United States, the randomness of fate, the anxiety of parenting, and the difference between representation and reality. The film is the subject of scholarly study.
