= News at Six (Hong Kong TV programme) =

- Genre: News, Weather, Sport
- Created by: ATV News
- Countries of origin: Hong Kong; China
- Original language: Cantonese

Production
- Producer: ATV
- Production location: Hong Kong
- Running time: 35 minutes

Original release
- Network: ATV Home
- Release: May 29, 1957 – April 1, 2016

News at Six was the evening news programme broadcast Monday to Sunday at 6:00pm in Hong Kong by television channel ATV Home. This programme first aired in ATV Home on May 29, 1957, with broadcasting time at 6:15pm, and ended together with the station's free-to-air license on April 1, 2016.

== History ==
The first evening bulletin was launched on May 29, 1957 - Tonight's Main News aired at 6:15pm.

On January 7, 1980 moved to 7:30pm, On September 1, 1980 at 7:00pm, moved back to the 6:30pm.

On January 5, 1981 moved to 7:30pm, On June 1, 1981 moved back to the 6:30pm.

On September 26, 1983 moved to 7:00pm.

On February 6, 1984 on Monday to Friday called Hong Kong Today and News Report and other programmes Hong Kong Today, ended on October 26, 1984.

On March 18, 1985, moved back to the 6:15pm.

On February 13, 1989 renamed News at 6:15.

On February 25, 1991 moved back to the 6:00pm, renamed News at Six.

On September 28, 1998 on Monday to Friday called The News Hour, News at Six, iNews Web and other new programmes Sports Bulletin.

On May 3, 1999 returned to News at Six.

On October 4, 1999, moved to 6:25pm, renamed ATV Focus News.

On October 18, 1999 renamed ATV News at 7:30.

On March 6, 2000 returned to News at Six at 6:00pm to Present.

On September 7, 2009 the programming switched to background.

On February 6, 2016, the programme was suspended due to insufficient manpower. It resumed on the 20th of the same month.

On April 1, 2016, the last news was broadcast before the end of ATV's free-to-air license.
