= Outlaw Country (2012 film) =

- Genre: Crime; Drama; Thriller
- Written by: Rachel Abramowitz; Joshua Goldin
- Directed by: Adam Arkin; Michael Dinner
- Starring: Mary Steenburgen; John Hawkes
- Music by: David Schwartz
- Country of origin: United States
- Original language: English

Production
- Executive producers: Art Linson; John Linson; David Manson
- Producer: Cyrus Yavneh
- Cinematography: Juan Ruiz Anchía
- Editor: Victor Du Bois
- Running time: 85 minutes
- Production companies: Linson Entertainment; Sarabande Productions

Original release
- Network: FX
- Release: August 24, 2012

Outlaw Country is a 2012 American television film directed by Adam Arkin and Michael Dinner and starring Mary Steenburgen and John Hawkes. The film premiered on FX on August 24, 2012. It was intended to be a television pilot but the series was not picked up.

== Premise ==
A crime thriller and family drama set against the backdrop of southern organized crime and Nashville royalty, where music, love, hope and tragedy collide.

== Cast ==
- Mary Steenburgen as Anastasia Lee
- Luke Grimes as Eli Larkin
- Haley Bennett as Annabel Lee
- John Hawkes as Tarzen Larkin
- Frank Hoyt Taylor as Jackman Folcum
- John-Paul Howard as Jonny
- Ron Prather as Sheriff Boyle
- Jim O'Rear as Deputy Sheriff Reese
- Todd Bush as Deputy Sheriff
- Johnny Whitworth as Ajax
- Marc Allen as Deputy Sheriff
- Bruce McKinnon as Trevor
