= Bo Goldman =

American screenwriter (1932–2023)

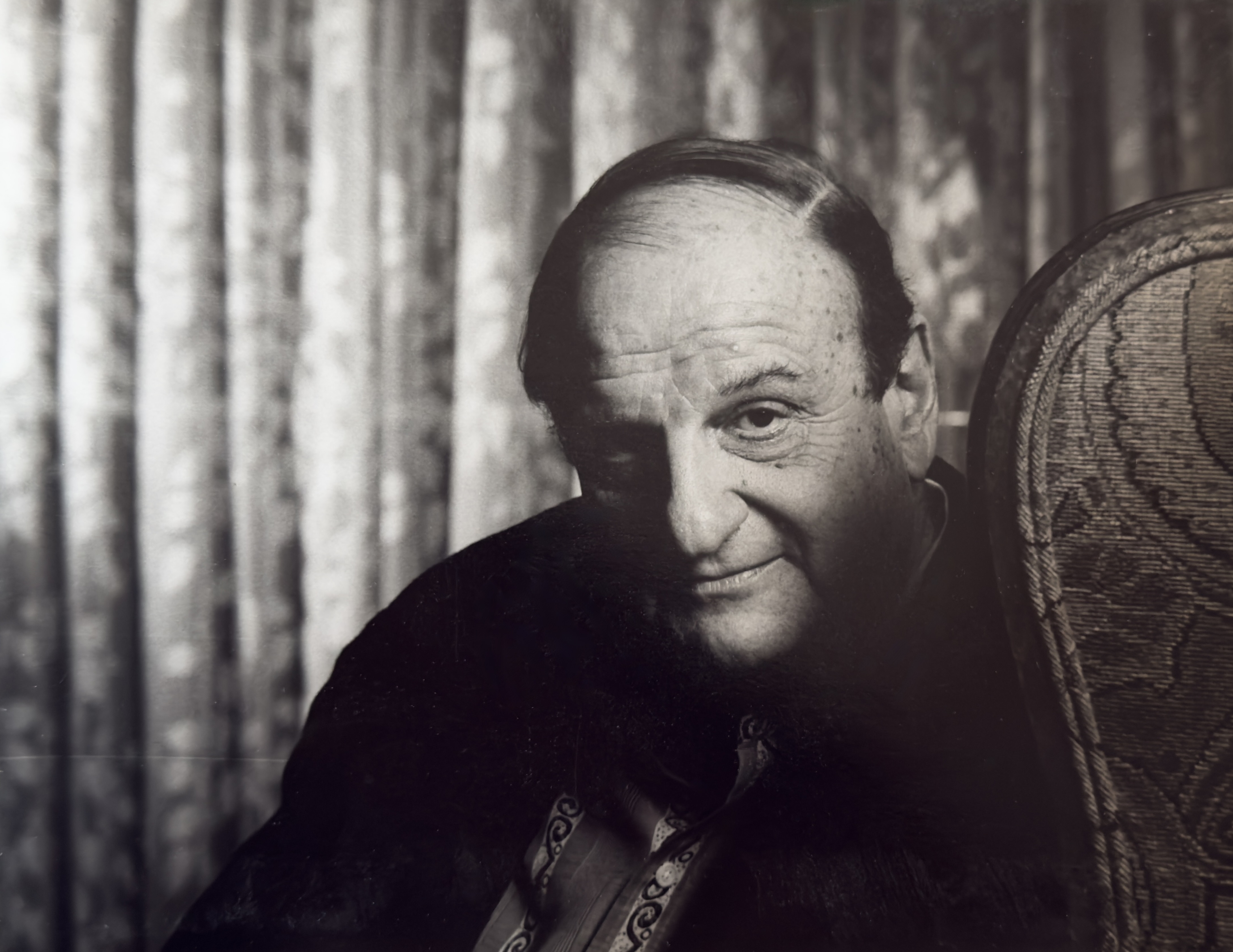
- Goldman at the Sunset Marquis in 1993
- Born: Robert Spencer Goldman; September 10, 1932; New York City, U.S.
- Died: July 25, 2023 (aged 90); Helendale, California, U.S.
- Education: Princeton University
- Occupations: Screenwriter; playwright
- Years active: 1958–2016
- Spouse: Mab Ashforth (m. 1954; died 2017)
- Children: 6

Bo Goldman (born Robert Spencer Goldman; September 10, 1932 – July 25, 2023) was an American screenwriter and playwright. He received numerous accolades, including two Academy Awards, two Golden Globe Awards, and two Writers Guild of America Awards, as well as the Lifetime Achievement Award in 1998. He also received two BAFTA Award nominations.

Goldman received two Academy Awards for his screenplays of One Flew Over the Cuckoo's Nest (1975) and Melvin and Howard (1980). He also wrote The Rose (1979), Shoot the Moon (1982), Scent of a Woman (1992), and Meet Joe Black (1998).

== Early life and education ==
Robert Spencer Goldman was born in 1932 to a Jewish family in New York City. He was the son of Lillian (Levy), a hat model, and Julian Goldman. Goldman's father was a Broadway producer, and owned a chain of well-known eastern department stores called the Goldman Stores, and as an early pioneer of "time payments", his business thrived, though the family struggled amid the Great Depression. The New York Times wrote that Goldman's upbringing was "strangely hand-to-mouth in a 12-room apartment on Park Avenue".

Eleanor Roosevelt admired the work of Helen Parkhurst, and was in the midst of expanding the population and resources of the Dalton School by promoting a merger between the Todhunter School for girls (founded by Winifred Todhunter). Julian Goldman became an early backer, and this school was where Bo began his education. He followed this by skipping his last year at Dalton in favor of fast-tracking through Phillips Exeter Academy, an experience that informed a script he would write years later, Scent of a Woman.

Goldman attended Princeton University, where he wrote, produced, and composed lyrics for, and was president of, the famed Princeton Triangle Club, a proving ground for F. Scott Fitzgerald, James Stewart, and director Joshua Logan. His 1953 production, Ham 'n Legs, was presented on The Ed Sullivan Show – the first Triangle production ever to appear on national television. In his early years, he went by the nickname Bob, but when writing for The Daily Princetonian, his first name was misprinted in one article as "Bo". He adopted it as his pen name and later legally changed his name.

Goldman is not related to prestigious screenwriter William Goldman, who, like Bo, also won Oscars for Best Original Screenplay and Best Adapted Screenplay.

== Military service ==
Upon graduation from Princeton, Goldman had a three-year stint in the U.S. Army stationed as personnel sergeant on Enewetak, an atoll in the Marshall Islands of the central Pacific Ocean used for nuclear bomb testing.

== Career ==
=== 1959–1974: Broadway and television work ===
After leaving the service, Goldman found work on Broadway as the lyricist for First Impressions (1959), a musical based on Jane Austen's Pride and Prejudice. Produced by composer Jule Styne, directed by Abe Burrows, and starring Hermione Gingold, Polly Bergen, and Farley Granger, the play received decent reviews, but closed after a brief, 92-show run. He would spend the next few years unsuccessfully trying to get his second show, Hurrah Boys Hurrah, produced.

Now married, and with four small children at home, he soon found a steady income working in the new world of live television at CBS. Goldman was mentored by Fred Coe (the "D.W. Griffith of dramatic television") and became part of the twilight of the Golden Age, associate producing and script editing Coe's prestigious Playhouse 90's, Days of Wine and Roses directed by a young John Frankenheimer, The Plot to Kill Stalin starring Eli Wallach, and Horton Foote's Old Man. Goldman went on to produce and write for public television on the award-winning NET Playhouse. After working together at NET, Burt Lancaster encouraged Goldman to try his hand at screenwriting, which resulted in an early version of Shoot the Moon. The script became Goldman's calling card, and he was soon "known for some of the best screenplays of the 1970s and '80s".

=== 1975–1990: Prominence and acclaim ===
After reading Shoot the Moon, Miloš Forman asked Goldman to write the screenplay for One Flew Over the Cuckoo's Nest. The film won all five top Academy Awards, including for Best Adapted Screenplay for Goldman. This was the first film to win the top five awards since Frank Capra's It Happened One Night in 1934. For his work on the film Goldman also received the Writers Guild Award and the Golden Globe Award.

Goldman next wrote The Rose (1979), which was nominated for four Academy Awards. This was followed by his original screenplay Melvin and Howard (1980), which garnered Goldman his second Academy Award, second Writers Guild Award, and the New York Film Critics Circle Award for Screenplay of the Year. Goldman's calling card, Shoot the Moon, was then filmed by Alan Parker and starred Diane Keaton and Albert Finney. The film received international acclaim and was embraced by some of America's most respected film critics. However, due to a previous agreement Warren Beatty had negotiated with MGM, the studio was bound that no film could be released with Diane Keaton in the same year as Beatty's Reds. Consequently, Shoot the Moon released with little or no fanfare the following February – long after the fourth quarter "awards season." Nonetheless, Goldman's peers remembered, and the following year, he earned his third Writers Guild Award nomination.

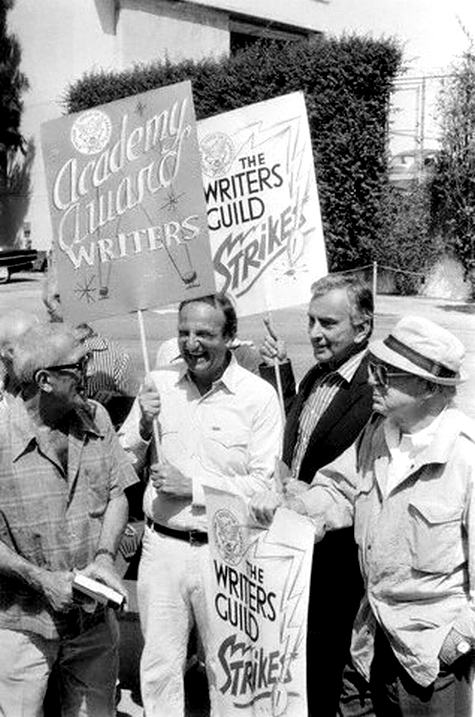
Los Angeles – The Screen Writers Guild strike brings motion picture and television production very nearly to a halt. Several famous writers are shown here picketing at the 20th Century-Fox Studios, including Richard Brooks, Bo Goldman, Gore Vidal, and Billy Wilder (1981)

Shoot the Moon received international acclaim and was embraced by America's most respected film critics with Pauline Kael of The New Yorker writing, "Shoot the Moon is perhaps the most revealing American movie of the era." David Denby – New York Magazine added "The picture seems like a miracle. A beautiful achievement." David Edelstein – The New York Post wrote "One of the best films of the decade."

For the next few years, Goldman contributed uncredited work to many scripts, including Miloš Forman's Ragtime (1981) starring James Cagney and Donald O'Connor, The Flamingo Kid (1984) starring Matt Dillon, and Warren Beatty's Dick Tracy (1990).

=== 1992–2016: Later work ===
Goldman followed this with Scent of a Woman (1992), receiving his second Golden Globe Award and third Academy Award nomination. In the film, Al Pacino plays Frank Slade, a blind, retired army colonel—a character Goldman said he based on someone he "knew from his days in the army." After being nominated seven times for roles as varied as Michael Corleone in Francis Ford Coppola's The Godfather and Frank Serpico in Sidney Lumet's Serpico, his portrayal of Frank Slade finally earned him the Academy Award for Best Actor. The film was beloved by critics, who along with Pacino's performance, singled out Goldman's screenplay:

Janet Maslin – The New York Times wrote "Mr. Pacino roars through this story with show-stopping intensity. Bo Goldman's screenplay provides him with a string of indelible wisecracks. Mr. Pacino's contribution, in the sort of role for which Oscar nominations were made, is to remind viewers that a great American actor is too seldom on the screen." Roger Ebert – Chicago Sun-Times declared, "The screenplay is by Bo Goldman (Melvin and Howard), who is more interested in the people than the plot. By the end of "Scent of a Woman," we have arrived at the usual conclusion of the coming-of-age movie, and the usual conclusion of the prep school movie. But rarely have we been taken there with so much intelligence and skill." The film has an 88% score on the critic site Rotten Tomatoes. Next up was Harold Becker's City Hall (1996) again starring Al Pacino and also John Cusack. Pacino played the corrupt Mayor of New York City. The film is peppered with musical theatre references, an homage to Goldman's father and his own Broadway days.

"The great Bo Goldman. He's the pre-eminent screenwriter – in my mind as good as it gets."

— Eric Roth, The New York Times, 1998.

After this was Meet Joe Black (1998) starring Brad Pitt and Anthony Hopkins. Critics gave the film mixed reviews. Pitt and the director, Martin Brest, took the biggest thumping. The main complaint centered not on content, but pace. Kenneth Turan of the Los Angeles Times wrote, "Where Meet Joe Black runs into most of its trouble is that everything happens so terribly slowly. Martin Brest has felt the need to inflate the tale until it floats around like one of those ungainly balloons in Macy's Thanksgiving Day Parade. Not helping the time go faster is the way star Brad Pitt has ended up playing Death. Ordinarily the most charismatic of actors, with an eye-candy smile and a winning ease, Pitt approaches this role largely on a leash, hanging around more like the protagonist of I Walked with a Zombie than a flesh-and-blood leading man."

Goldman did a rewrite of The Perfect Storm in 2000. The film went on to earn $329,000,000.

== Influence ==
In a 1998 interview with The New York Times, screenwriter Eric Roth said, "The great Bo Goldman. He's the pre-eminent screenwriter – in my mind as good as it gets. He has the most varied and intelligent credits, from Cuckoo's Nest to Shoot the Moon, the best divorce movie ever made, to Scent of a Woman, to the great satire Melvin and Howard. He rarely makes mistakes, and he manages to maintain a distinctive American voice. And he manages to stay timely."

Roth once again expressed his admiration for Goldman in an October 2017 New York Magazine article titled "The 100 Best Screenwriters of All Time". Here, Roth writes, "The man whose work made the biggest impression on me, because of his audacious originality, his understanding of social mores, his ironic sense of humor, and his outright anger at being human, and all with his soft spoken grace and eloquent simplicity is Bo Goldman. This degenerate horse player of a man lived his life like he lived his politics, never shying from a fight. His words were silk, never wasted or misplaced, and he would throw away what others would consider glorious and did it all without a moment’s fanfare.”

== Personal life and death ==
Goldman married Mabel "Mab" Ashforth in 1954, and they remained married until her death in 2017. They lived in Rockport, Maine, with their daughter, Serena, and son-in-law, Todd Field. Goldman died on July 25, 2023. He was ninety.

== Filmography ==
=== Television ===
Year	Title	Writer	Producer	Notes	Ref.
1948	The Philco Television Playhouse	No	Associate		
1956–1959	Playhouse 90	Yes	Associate		
1957	The Seven Lively Arts	No	Yes		
1961	ABC Close-Up!	No	Yes	1 Episode	
1961–1962	Theatre '62	Yes	No	2 Episodes	
1962	The Paradine Case	Yes	No	TV movie	
1963	NBC Children's Theatre	Yes	No	1 Episode	
1964	The Defenders	Yes	No	1 Episode	
1974	Great Performances	No	Yes	2 Episodes	

=== Film writer ===
Year	Title	Director	Notes	Ref.
1975	One Flew Over the Cuckoo's Nest	Miloš Forman	Co-written with Lawrence Hauben	
1979	The Rose	Mark Rydell	Co-written with Michael Cimino	
1980	Melvin and Howard	Jonathan Demme		
1982	Shoot the Moon	Alan Parker		
1988	Little Nikita	Richard Benjamin	Co-written with John Hill	
1992	Scent of a Woman	Martin Brest		
1996	City Hall	Harold Becker	Co-written with Ken Lipper, Paul Schrader, and Nicholas Pileggi	
1998	Meet Joe Black	Martin Brest	Co-written with Ron Osborn, Jeff Reno, and Kevin Wade	
2016	Rules Don't Apply	Warren Beatty	Story only	

Soundtrack

Year	Title	Lyrics	Ref.
1972	When the Legends Die	"When You Speak to the Kids" "The Riderless Wagon" "Summer Storm"	

Uncredited script revision

- Ragtime (1981)
- Swing Shift (1984)
- The Flamingo Kid (1984)
- Dick Tracy (1990)
- First Knight (1995)
- The Perfect Storm (2000)
- Goya's Ghosts (2006)

=== Unmade scripts ===
Year	Title	Description	Ref.
1964	Cry Havoc	An adaptation of the novel for MGM	
1974	Kid Shelleen	Script for a sequel to Cat Ballou	
1975	The Legend of King Kong	Unused King Kong remake script for Universal Pictures	
1975	Bottled Lightning	To have been directed by Herbert Ross	
1978	A Chorus Line	An adaptation of the musical to have been directed by Mike Nichols	
1979	Starting Over	Unused early draft	
1980	Black Sands	To have been directed by Bruno Barreto	
1980	The Four Hundred	An adaptation of the novel	
1982	Final Payments	An adaptation of the novel to have starred Diane Keaton	
1982	The Old Neighborhood	An adaptation of the novel Wrote with the intention of directing	
1984	The Anita Factor	Script for MGM/UA and Columbia Pictures	
1985	Me for You	Script for Paramount Pictures	
1989	Monkeys	An adaptation of the novel to have starred Kevin Kline and Diane Keaton; Wrote with the intention of directing	
1989	Time Steps	Script for Penny Marshall, based on her mother	
1991	The Truth	An adaptation of The Day America Told the Truth for Imagine Films	
1992	Shouter	Script by James Andrew Miller, described as a "contemporary Third Man" about a CIA agent Intention of directing	
1993	Underground	To have been directed by Todd Field	
1995	Wild Strawberries	A remake of the 1957 film to have starred Gregory Peck; Wrote with the intention of directing	
1998	Imagining Nathan	Uncredited script revision for Universal Pictures	
2001	Rebel Raider	Script for Paramount Pictures	
2003	The Colonel and Me	Script for Barry Levinson about a young Jerry Weintraub's relationship with Col. Tom Parker	
2006	Rififi	Script for a remake of the 1955 French film to have starred Al Pacino	
2006	Every Time We Say Goodbye	Wrote with the intention of directing	
—N/a	Sonny	Script about the younger life of Howard Hughes	
—N/a	Love Me or Leave Me	Script for a remake of the 1955 musical film to have starred Al Pacino	

== Awards and nominations ==
Academy Awards

Year	Category	Title	Result	Ref.
1975	Best Adapted Screenplay	One Flew Over the Cuckoo's Nest	Won	
1980	Best Original Screenplay	Melvin and Howard	Won	
1992	Best Adapted Screenplay	Scent of a Woman	Nominated	

BAFTA Awards

Year	Category	Title	Result
1975	Best Screenplay	One Flew Over the Cuckoo's Nest	Nominated
1992	Best Adapted Screenplay	Scent of a Woman	Nominated

Golden Globe Awards

Year	Category	Title	Result
1975	Best Screenplay	One Flew Over the Cuckoo's Nest	Won
1992	Best Screenplay	Scent of a Woman	Won

Writers Guild of America

Year	Category	Title	Result
1975	Best Adapted Screenplay	One Flew Over the Cuckoo's Nest	Won
1980	Best Original Screenplay	Melvin and Howard	Won
1982	Best Original Screenplay	Shoot the Moon	Nominated
1992	Best Adapted Screenplay	Scent of a Woman	Nominated
1998	Laurel Award for Screenwriting Achievement		Won

Other awards

Year	Association	Category	Title	Result	Ref.
1980	Boston Society of Film Critics	Best Screenplay	Melvin and Howard	Won	
1980	National Society of Film Critics	Best Screenplay	Melvin and Howard	Won	
1980	New York Film Critics Circle	Best Screenplay	Melvin and Howard	Won	
