= Ayoka Chenzira =

American producer, director, animator, writer, filmmaker and transmedia storyteller

Ayoka "Ayo" Chenzira
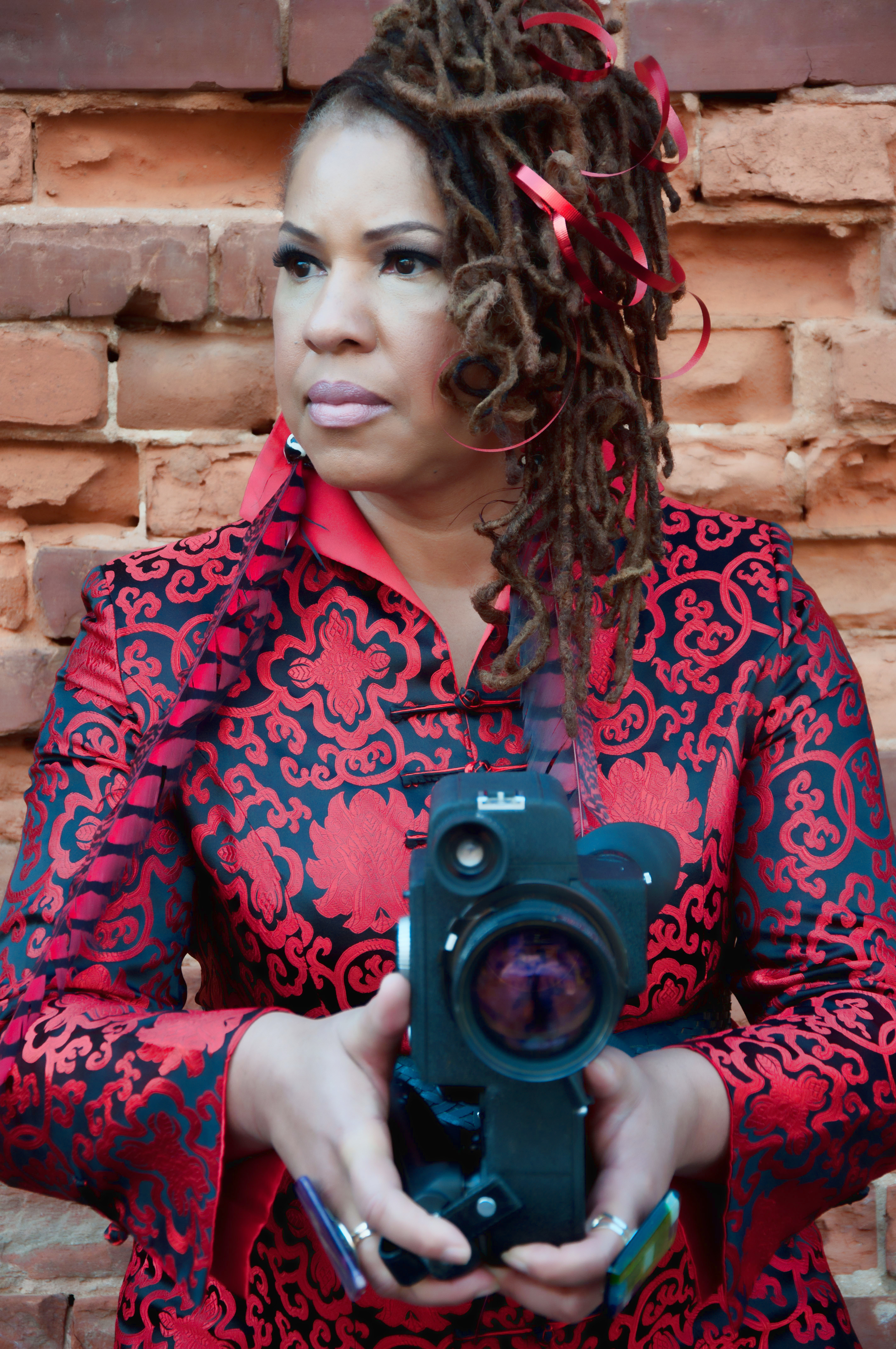
- Born: November 8, 1953 (age 72); Philadelphia, Pennsylvania
- Occupations: Filmmaker and Television Director
- Years active: 1979-present
- Known for: One of a handful of Black experimental filmmakers working in the late 1970s, One of the first African American women filmmakers to write, produce, and direct a feature film
- Notable work: "Hairpiece: A Film for Nappyheaded People", "Zajota & the Boogie Spirit", "Alma's Rainbow", "MOTV", "HERadventure"

Ayoka "Ayo" Chenzira (born November 8, 1953) is an independent African-American producer, film director, television director, animator, writer, experimental filmmaker, and transmedia storyteller. She is the first African American woman animator and one of a handful of Black experimental filmmakers working since the late 1970s. She has earned international acclaim for her experimental, documentary, animation, and cross-genre filmmaking productions. Her work, as well as her efforts as one of the first African American woman film educators, have led some in the press to describe her as a media activist for social justice and challenging stereotype representations of African Americans in the mainstream media.

Chenzira is most well known for her 35mm feature film Alma’s Rainbow (1993), the drama MOTV, animated films Hair Piece: A Film for Nappyheaded People (1984) and Zajota & the Boogie Spirit (1989). Many of her recent works as a transmedia storyteller play with the increasingly digital media world through art that combines material objects with digital environments, and interactive films including Chenzira and her daughter HaJ's collaboration on HERadventure (2013).

== Early life ==
Born in Philadelphia, Ayoka Chenzira was raised by her mother in North Philadelphia, living in the same building where her mother owned a beauty salon. She grew up playing the piano, cello, field hockey and studying ballet. Chenzira was exposed to art from a young age, including dance lessons, opera and theatre visits as a child. Her mother made reimagined designer clothing for Ayoka, and strongly encouraged her to pursue her artistic ambitions. She has been working with moving images since she was 17.

== Education ==
After graduating from high school, Chenzira studied film and photography at The College of New Rochelle in Westchester, New York. She accomplished her M.A. degree in education at Columbia University. She received her B.F.A. degree in film production from New York University, where her thesis film was Syvilla: They Dance To Her Drum (1979), "a short film that documented the African American concert dancer, Syvilla Fort, who was the vital link between the Katherine Dunham and Alvin Ailey periods of modern dance and who was Chenzira's dance teacher". She is the first African American to have earned her PhD in Digital Media Arts at the Georgia Institute of Technology.

Chenzira is the Division Chair of the Arts at Spelman College and one of the first African Americans to teach film production in higher education.

== Career ==
Chenzira was one of a group of young Black filmmakers who worked outside of mainstream financing and production systems for films. From 1981 to 1984, Chenzira was the programs director of the Black Filmmakers Foundation, where she helped promote and distribute black films. She was one of the first African-American women to produce a feature-length film, Alma's Rainbow (1993). In 1984, she was one of seven writer/directors selected for the Sundance Institute.

In the mid-1980s, Chenzira formed Red Carnelian, a New-York based production and distribution company focusing on media productions depicting life and culture of African Americans. The company has a successful production division as well as a distribution division, Black Indie Classics.

Chenzira was the Chair of the Department of Media and Communication Arts at the City College of New York, where she managed programs in advertising, public relations, journalism, film and video; she also co-created their first M.F.A in media arts production graduate program.

Chenzira was an arts administrator and lobbyist for independent cinema. She was a founding board member of Production Partners in New York, a nonprofit organization dedicated to the visibility of African-American as well as Hispanic and Latino American films. She was key in providing support for Charles Lane’s award-winning feature Sidewalk Stories (1989). She has also served as a media panelist for the Jerome Foundation, the National Endowment for the Arts, and the New York State Council on the Arts. Her contributions along with 14 other panelists for the Minority Task Force on Public Television resulted in the first Multicultural Public Television Fund.

In the mid nineties, Chenzira was consultant to the M-Net Television of South Africa. She taught screenwriting and directing in Kenya, Nigeria, Senegal, and South Africa.

In 2001, Chenzira was invited to serve as the first William and Camille Cosby Endowed Professor in the Arts at Spelman College in Atlanta. There, she created and directed the award-winning Digital Moving Image Salon (DMIS), a year-long research and documentary production course. She also created and served as director of Oral Narratives and Digital Technology, a joint venture between Spelman College and the Durham Institute of Technology (DIT) where she designed and taught documentary filmmaking primarily for Zulu students at DIT. in 2015, Chenzira's films are in several notable permanent collections including those at Museum of Modern Art and the Whitney Museum of American Art. She was also invited to show her early films at Lincoln Center as part of a celebration of Black filmmakers titled " Tell it like it is : Black independents in New York, 1968–1986. and the touring exhibition, We Wanted a Revolution: Black Radical Women 1965–1985.

== Films ==
Hair Piece: A Film for Nappyheaded People is a 1984 satirical short film incorporating mixed media and animation to describe the emotional connection of Black women and their hair. Chenzira said the film was inspired by the question, "Why is kinky hair seen as broken?" Chenzira, noted for her feminist topics, points out "self image for African-American women living in a society where beautiful hair is viewed as hair that blows in the wind". The pioneering short animated film tackles matters of space and personal rights for Black women and their bodies. The award-winning ten-minute, 16-mm color animation contrasts the hair experiences and culture of Black women against white beauty standards. Chenzira depicts the salon locale as an engaging space, calling for an initiation in scholarly and film discourse about Black hair culture and Black female agency. Using humor, music, and mixed media of magazine photographs, Chenzira examines African American beauty trends as well as issues for Black women from the early 1900s to the early 1980s. In 2018, Hair Piece: A Film for Nappyheaded People was selected for preservation in the National Film Registry by the Library of Congress, being deemed "culturally, historically, or aesthetically significant".

Chenzira produced and directed Alma's Rainbow in 1993, a "coming-of-age" comedy-drama about middle-class black women in Brooklyn. This was one of the first 35mm feature films produced, written and directed by an African-American woman. It is one of Billboard Magazine’s top 40 home video rentals. Through the course of the film, Alma Gold, her daughter Rainbow, and Rainbow’s semi-estranged Aunt Ruby work to reinstate themselves and their various types of "work" with a sense of value in society, to find happiness in life, love and finances. The film explores the tensions and pitfalls that arise in a journey of this nature—most paths are fraught with risk, while others should not be pursued under any circumstances. Though assumptions were made about the film on the "palette of the movie’s mise en scene", "bubble gum dialogue" and "splashy costumes", the subject matter had intellectual weight in its deconstruction of roles based on race, class, and gender. Chenzira dismantles the sexist, capitalist modes of patriarchy that negatively affect women's self-images within the working world; a struggle Black women face in "how to deprogram the ideological brainwashing they have received from the capitalist system without sacrificing the spiritual and economic success that such a system allows them access to through its lines of power."

Two of her films, 1979's Sylvilla: They Dance to her Dream and 1989's Zajota & the Boogie Spirit, are explorations of the role of dancing in black history. Sylvilla is a documentary exploring the life of Sylvilla Fort, who was a dance, choreographer and the vital training link between the Katherine Dunham and Alvin Ailey . periods of dance. Zajota & the Boogie Spirit is an animated film about the path of Africans taken to America and the Caribbean. Chenzira said the film grew out of a sense that Black Americans felt discomfort at the idea of dancing well.

Beginning with Zajota & the Boogie Spirit, Chenzira's work began to focus more on in digital and transmedia storytelling in the 2000s. She released the first part of HERadventure, an "interactive sci-fi fantasy film" on her website and YouTube. Created by Chenzira and her daughter HaJ and funded by the National Endowment for the Arts, the part film and part interactive game has been accessible worldwide online since 2014. Her transition from film to a "transmedia storyteller" has been partly inspired by the new multitasking environments people inhabit: "parts of the story can be on a specific website while other parts can be accessed through a smartphone or on Facebook, Instagram, etc. If you look around most people are doing more than one thing. They’re on phone while in conversation with someone else and also looking at some other screen. This is not the linear way of being in the world for which most people have been trained." In 2018, Chenzira began directing episodic television.

=== Filmography ===
- Syvilla: They Dance to Her Drum (Short) (1979)
- Hair Piece: A Film for Nappy Headed People (Short) (1984)
- Secret Sounds Screaming (Short) (1985)
- Five Out of Five (Music Video) (1986)
- On Becoming a Woman (Animation) (1986)
- The Lure and the Lore (short) (1989)
- Zajota and the Boogie Spirit (Short) (1990)
- Pull Your Head to the Moon (TV Short) (1992)
- Alma's Rainbow (1993)
- Snowfire (Short) (1994)
- Sentry at the Gate: The Comedy of Jane Galvin-Lewis (1995)
- In the Rivers of Mercy Angst (Short) (1997)
- HERadventure (2014)
- MOTV (My Own TV)

=== Television credits ===
In 2018, Chenzira received a call from Ava DuVernay inviting her to direct an episode in season 3 of Queen Sugar (Here Beside the River). For this episode Chenzira was nominated for an NAACP Award for Best Director. Since then, she has directed the season 4 finale of Queen Sugar, and episodes of Greenleaf, Trinkets, Delilah, Dynasty, A League of Their Own, Octavia Butler's Kindred, and Beacon 23.

== Accolades ==
Black Women Animate and the Cartoon Network honored Ayoka Chenzira in 2020 with the Cultural Innovator Award.

In 2019, the Academy of Motion Picture Arts & Sciences began to restore and preserve the films of Ayoka Chenzira.

Many of Chenzira's films today are in permanent collections including MOMA, the Whitney Museum of American Art and some have been translated into French and Japanese. Her 1984 film short Hair Piece was chosen for preservation in the 2018 class of the National Film Registry.

In 2018, Chenzira was nominated for an NAACP Award for her directing work on the television series, Queen Sugar.

Chenzira won the 1991 Sony Innovator Award, and has been honored for her contributions to Black cinema by the mayors of New York City and Detroit.

=== Additional recognitions and honors ===
- Brooklyn Cultural Crossroads Achievement Award, 1981
- Paul Robeson Award, 1984
- First Place/Cultural Affairs of National Black Programming Consortium, 1984
- Mayor's Award for Contributions to the Field —Detroit, 1987
- First Place for Animation (Zajota, The Boogie Spirit), Black Filmmakers Hall of Fame, 1990
- Best Producer, National Black Programming Consortium, 1990
- Silver Apple, National Educational Film and Video Festival, 1990
- First Place, Sony Innovator Award in Media, 1991
- First Place, John Hanks Award, 1991
- First Place, Dance Screen, 1992
- Best Overall, Best Drama, Community Choice Award, Black Filmmakers Hall of Fame 1993
- Apple Computer Distinguished Educator Award (2003)
