= 5th Independent Spirit Awards =

US film awards ceremony in 1990

- Date: March 24, 1990
- Site: Hollywood Roosevelt Hotel; Los Angeles, California; U.S.
- Hosted by: Buck Henry

Highlights
- Best Film: Sex, Lies, and Videotape
- Most awards: Sex, Lies, and Videotape (4); Drugstore Cowboy (4)
- Most nominations: Drugstore Cowboy (8)

The 5th Independent Spirit Awards, honoring the best in independent filmmaking for 1989, were announced on March 24, 1990 at the Hollywood Roosevelt Hotel in Los Angeles. It was hosted by Buck Henry.

== Winners and nominees ==
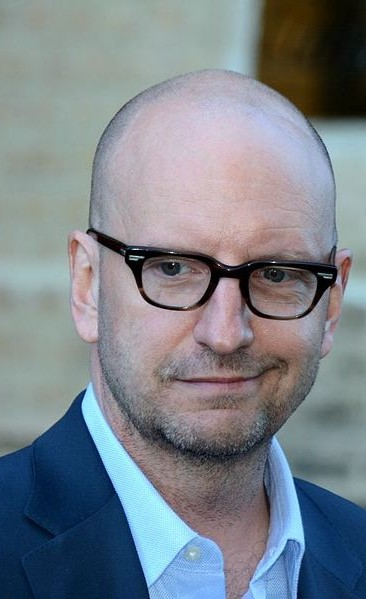
Steven Soderbergh, Best Director winner

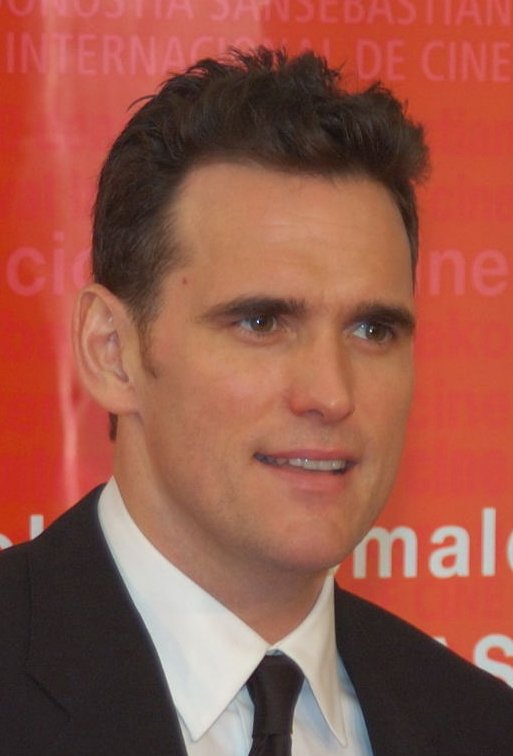
Matt Dillon, Best Male Lead winner

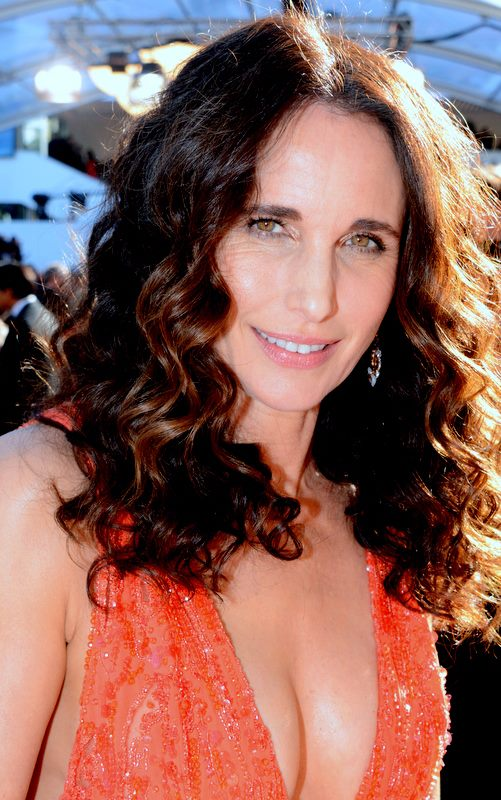
Andie MacDowell, Best Female Lead winner

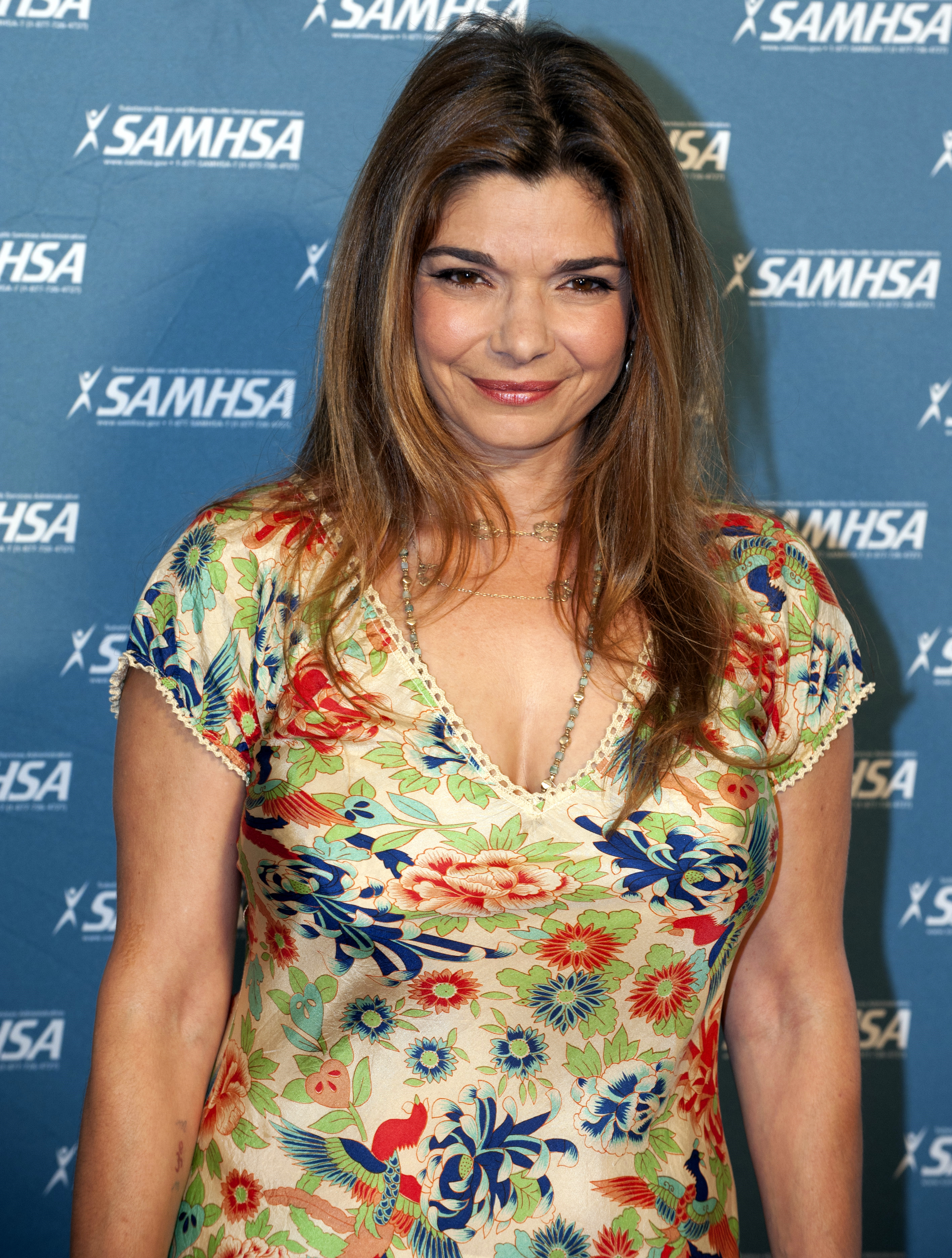
Laura San Giacomo, Best Supporting Female winner

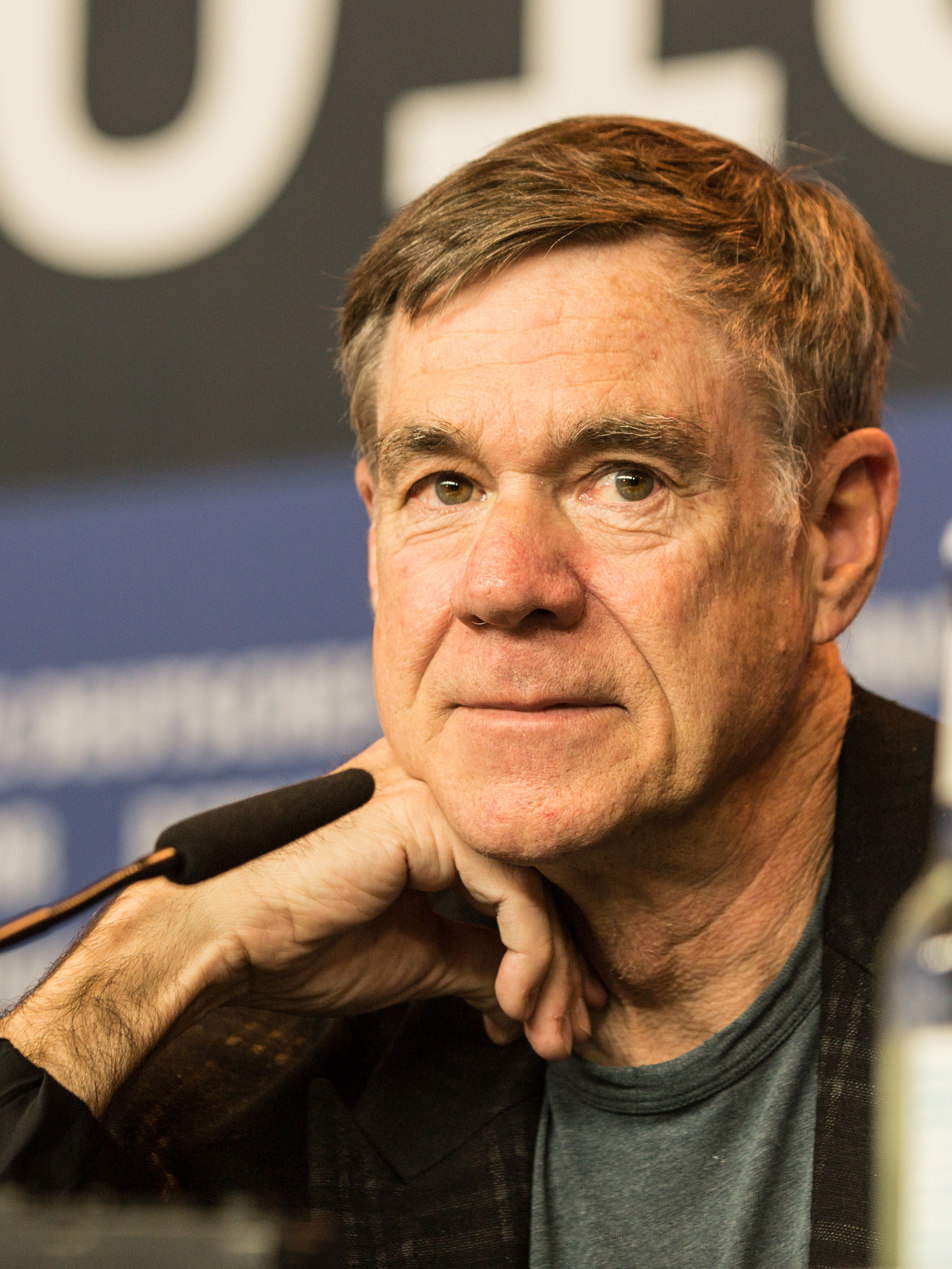
Gus Van Sant, Best Screenplay co-winner

Best Feature	Best Director
Sex, Lies, and Videotape: Drugstore Cowboy; Heat and Sunlight; Mystery Train; True Love	Steven Soderbergh – Sex, Lies, and Videotape: Jim Jarmusch – Mystery Train; Charles Lane – Sidewalk Stories; Nancy Savoca – True Love; Gus Van Sant – Drugstore Cowboy
Best Actor	Best Actress
Matt Dillon – Drugstore Cowboy: Nicolas Cage – Vampire's Kiss; Charles Lane – Sidewalk Stories; Randy Quaid – Parents; James Spader – Sex, Lies, and Videotape	Andie MacDowell – Sex, Lies, and Videotape: Youki Kudoh – Mystery Train; Kelly Lynch – Drugstore Cowboy; Winona Ryder – Heathers; Annabella Sciorra – True Love
Best Supporting Actor	Best Supporting Actress
Max Perlich – Drugstore Cowboy: Steve Buscemi – Mystery Train; Scott Coffey – Shag; Gary Farmer – Powwow Highway; Screamin' Jay Hawkins – Mystery Train	Laura San Giacomo – Sex, Lies, and Videotape: Bridget Fonda – Shag; Heather Graham – Drugstore Cowboy; Mare Winningham – Miracle Mile; Mary Woronov – Scenes from the Class Struggle in Beverly Hills
Best Screenplay	Best First Feature
Drugstore Cowboy – Gus Van Sant and Daniel Yost: 84 Charlie Mopic – Patrick S. Duncan; Heathers – Daniel Waters; Miracle Mile – Steve De Jarnatt; Mystery Train – Jim Jarmusch	Heathers: 84 Charlie Mopic; Powwow Highway; Sidewalk Stories; Talking to Strangers
Best Cinematography	Best Foreign Film
Drugstore Cowboy – Robert Yeoman: Earth Girls Are Easy – Oliver Stapleton; Mystery Train – Robby Müller; Powwow Highway – Toyomichi Kurita; Talking to Strangers – Robert Tregenza	My Left Foot • Ireland/UK: Distant Voices, Still Lives • UK; Hanussen • Hungary/West Germany/Austria; High Hopes • UK; Rouge • Hong Kong

=== Films with multiple nominations and awards ===
==== Films that received multiple nominations ====
Nominations	Film
8	Drugstore Cowboy
7	Mystery Train
5	Sex, Lies, and Videotape
3	Heathers
3	Powwow Highway
3	Sidewalk Stories
3	True Love
2	84 Charlie Mopic
2	Miracle Mile
2	Talking to Strangers
2	Shag

==== Films that won multiple awards ====
Awards	Film
4	Sex, Lies, and Videotape
4	Drugstore Cowboy

== Special Distinction Award ==
Do the Right Thing
