= Independent Spirit Award for Best Director =

Annual US film award

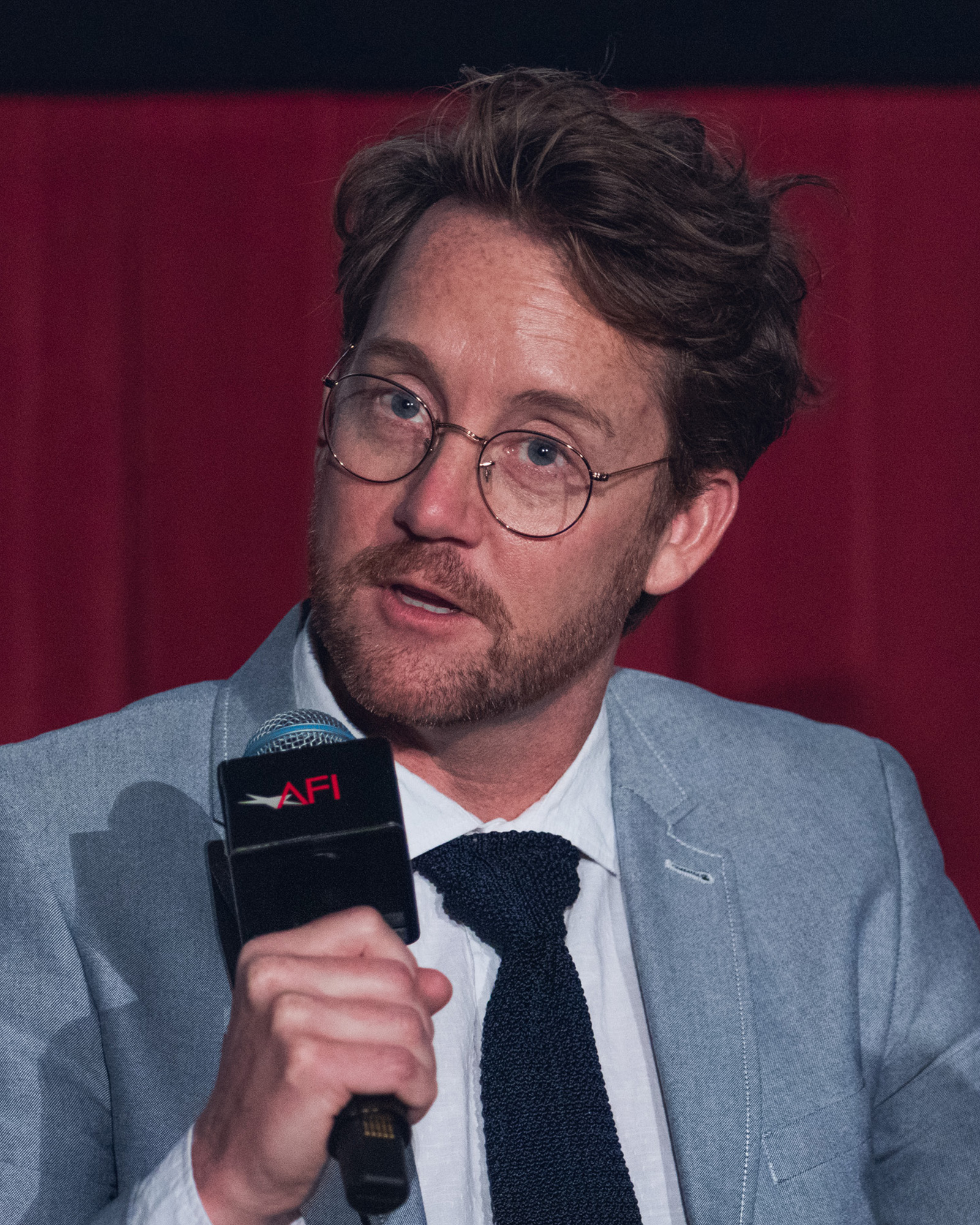
- The 2025 recipient: Clint Bentley
- Awarded for: Best Director
- Country: United States
- Presented by: Film Independent
- First award: 1985
- Currently held by: Clint Bentley for Train Dreams (2025)
- Website: filmindependent.org

The Film Independent's Spirit Award for Best Director is one of the annual Independent Spirit Awards.

== History ==
It was first presented in 1985 with Joel Coen and Martin Scorsese being the first winners of the category for Blood Simple and After Hours, respectively.

Directors Barry Jenkins, Tom McCarthy, Joel Coen and Alexander Payne are the only winners who have received this award more than once, with two wins each. Todd Haynes holds the record of most nominations with six (winning one for Far from Heaven), followed by Gus Van Sant with five. Martha Coolidge was the first female director to win the award, receiving it in 1991. Chloé Zhao was the first female of color to win the category in 2020.

== Winners and nominees ==
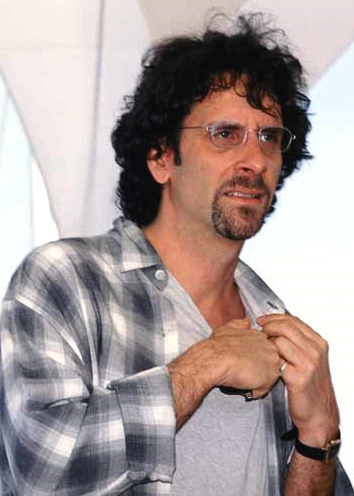
Joel Coen won twice, for Blood Simple (1985) and Fargo (1996).

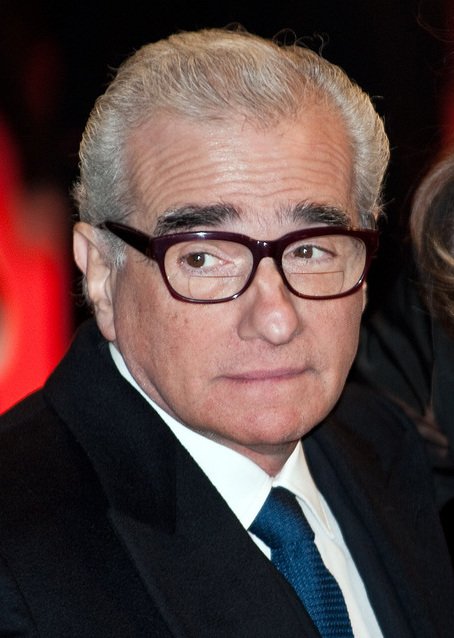
Martin Scorsese won for After Hours (1985).

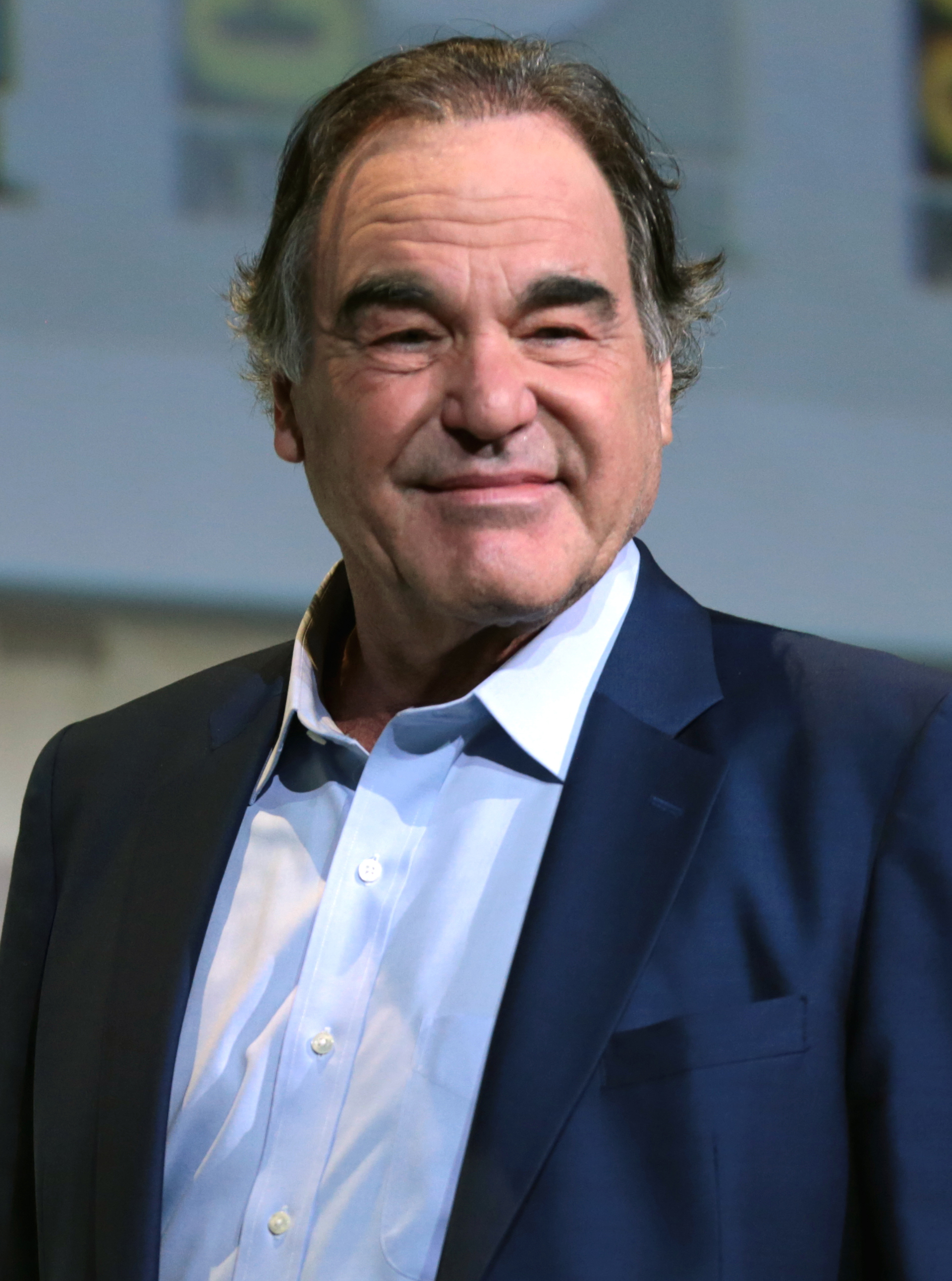
Oliver Stone won for Platoon (1986).

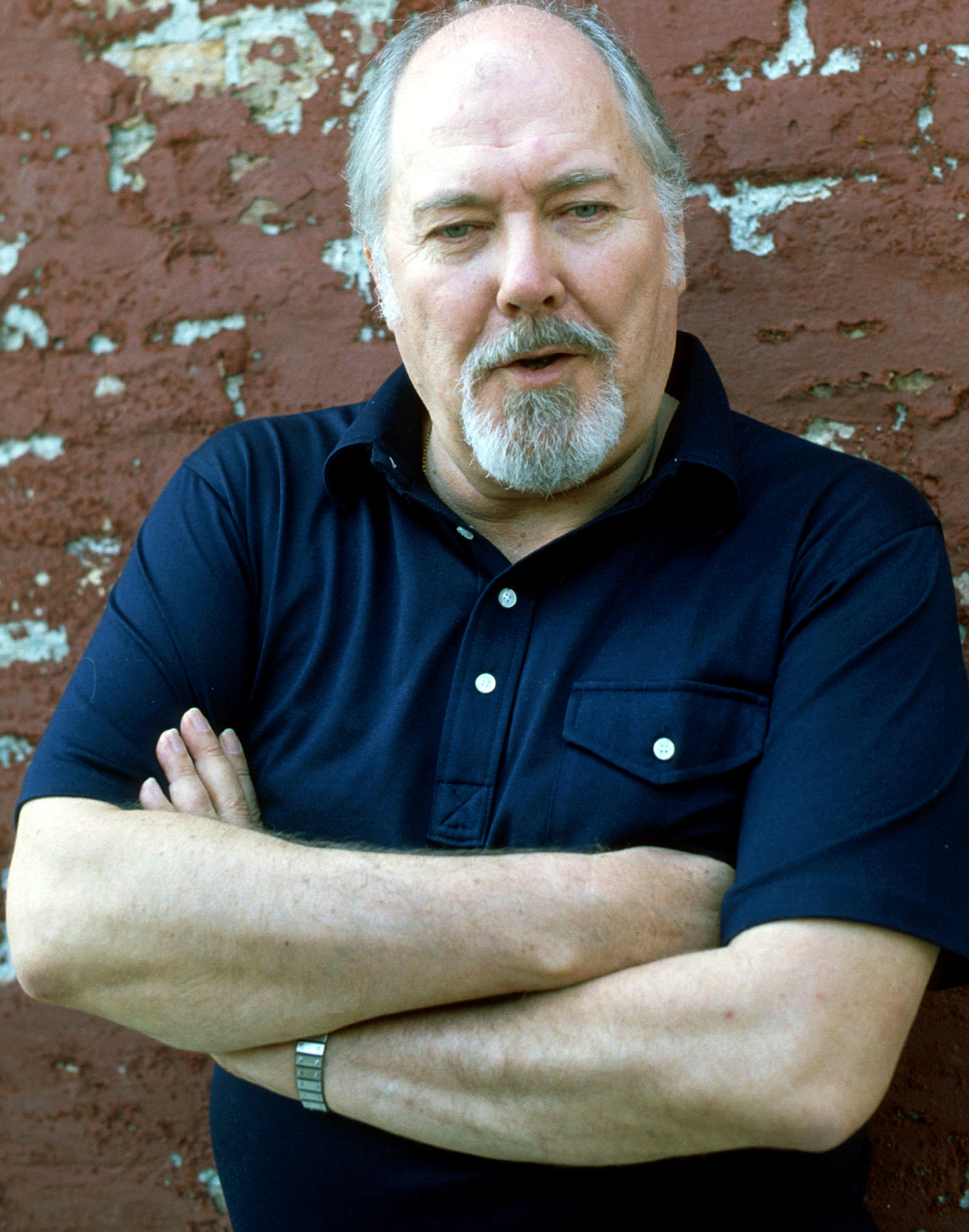
Robert Altman won for Short Cuts.

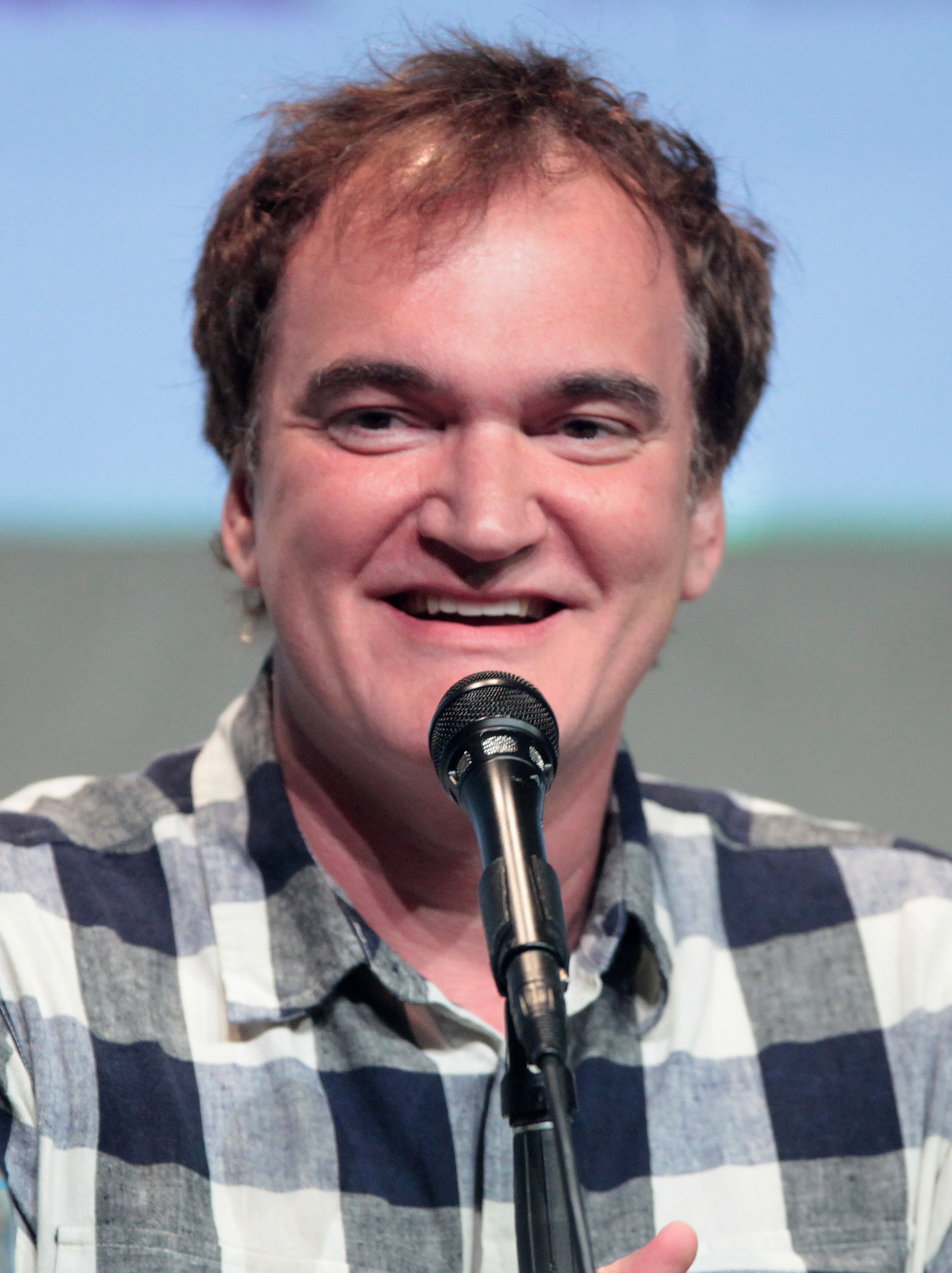
Quentin Tarantino won for Pulp Fiction (1994).

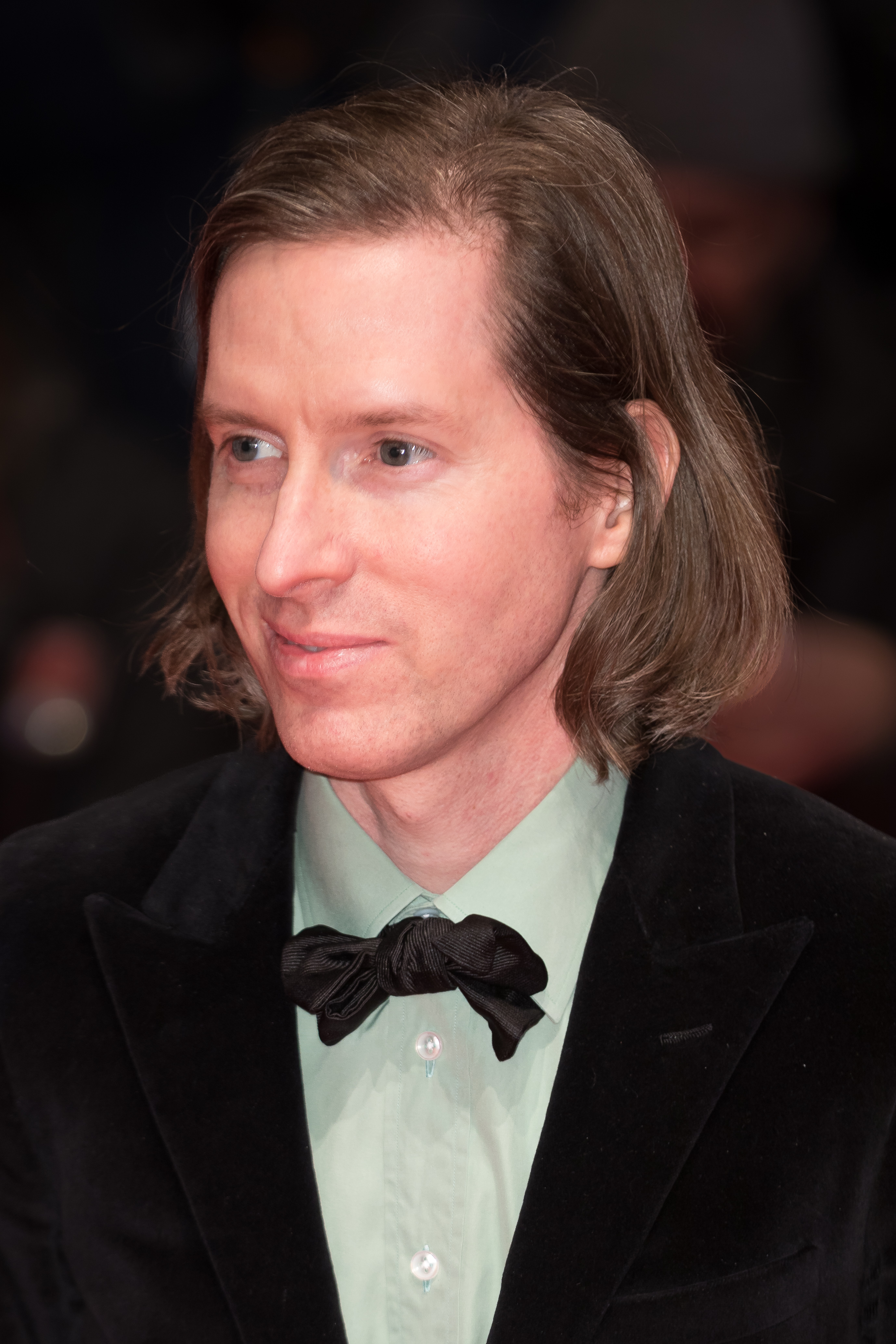
Wes Anderson won for Rushmore.

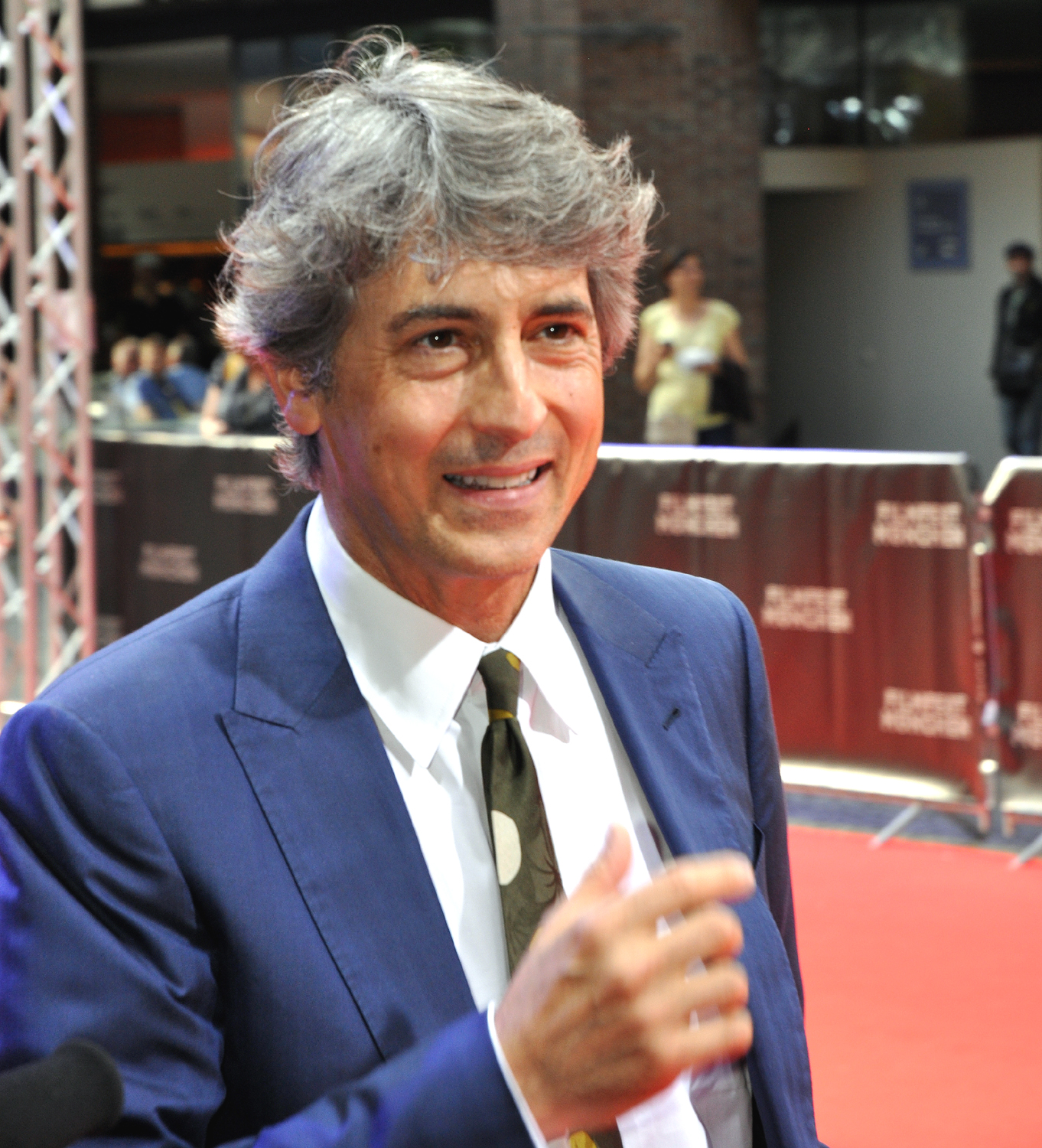
Alexander Payne won twice for Election (1999) and Sideways (2004).

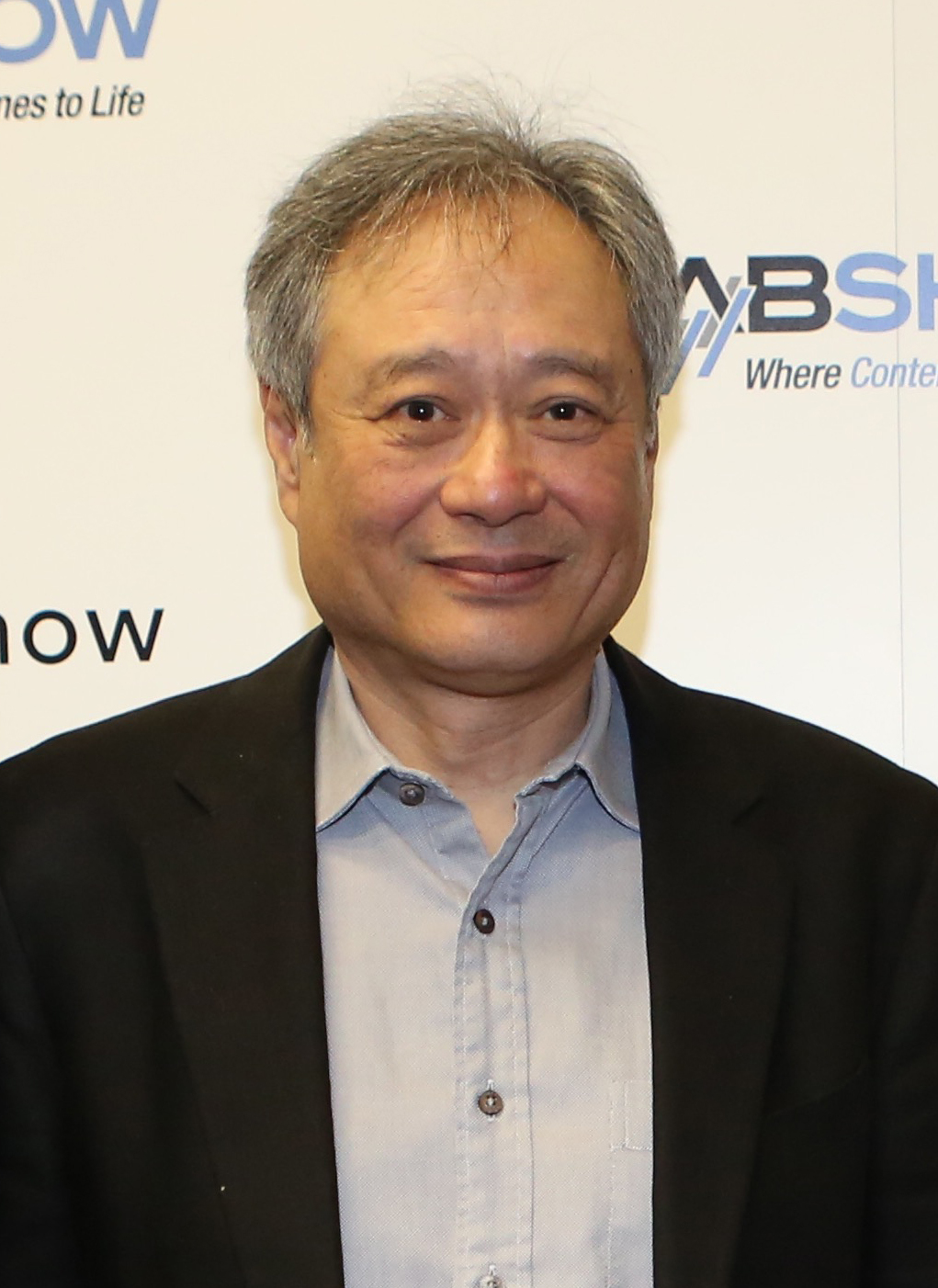
Ang Lee won twice, for Crouching Tiger, Hidden Dragon (2000) and Brokeback Mountain (2005).

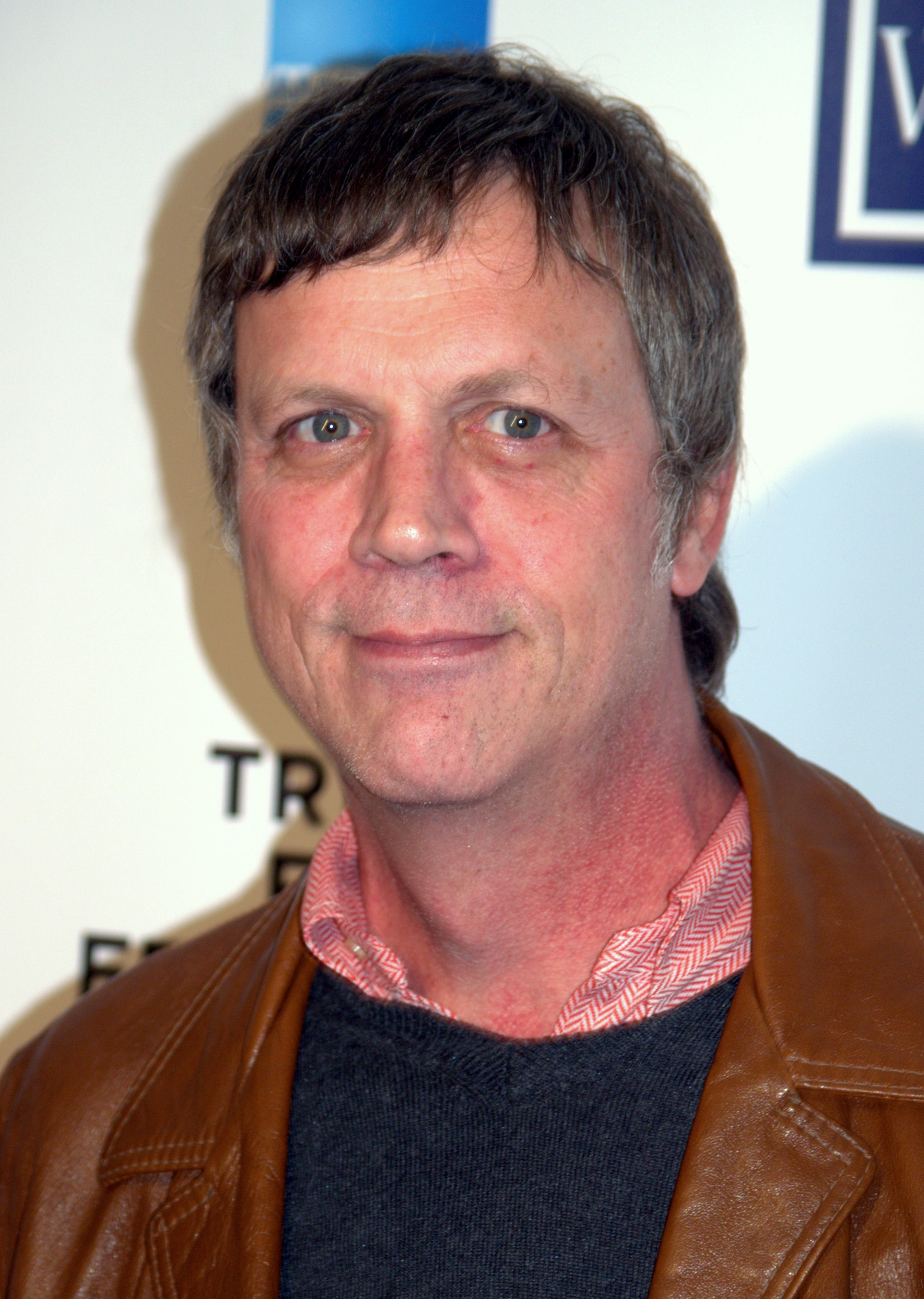
Todd Haynes won for Far from Heaven.

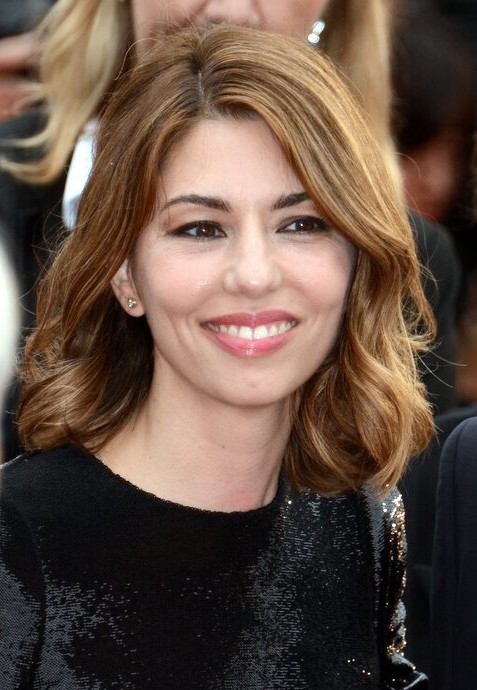
Sofia Coppola won for Lost in Translation.

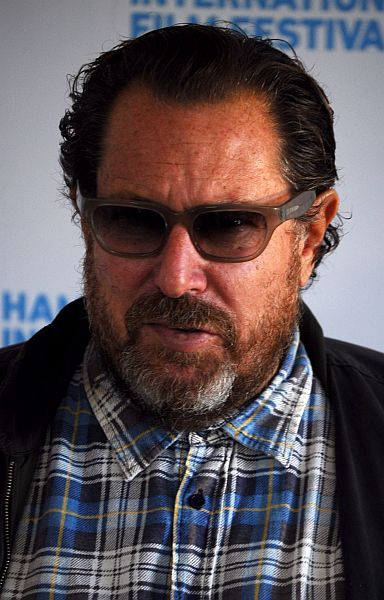
Julian Schnabel won for The Diving Bell and the Butterfly.

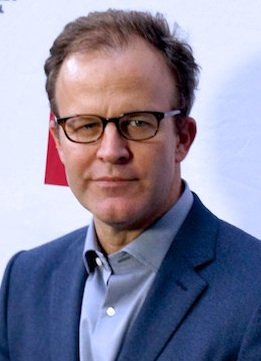
Tom McCarthy won for The Visitor (2008) and Spotlight (2015).

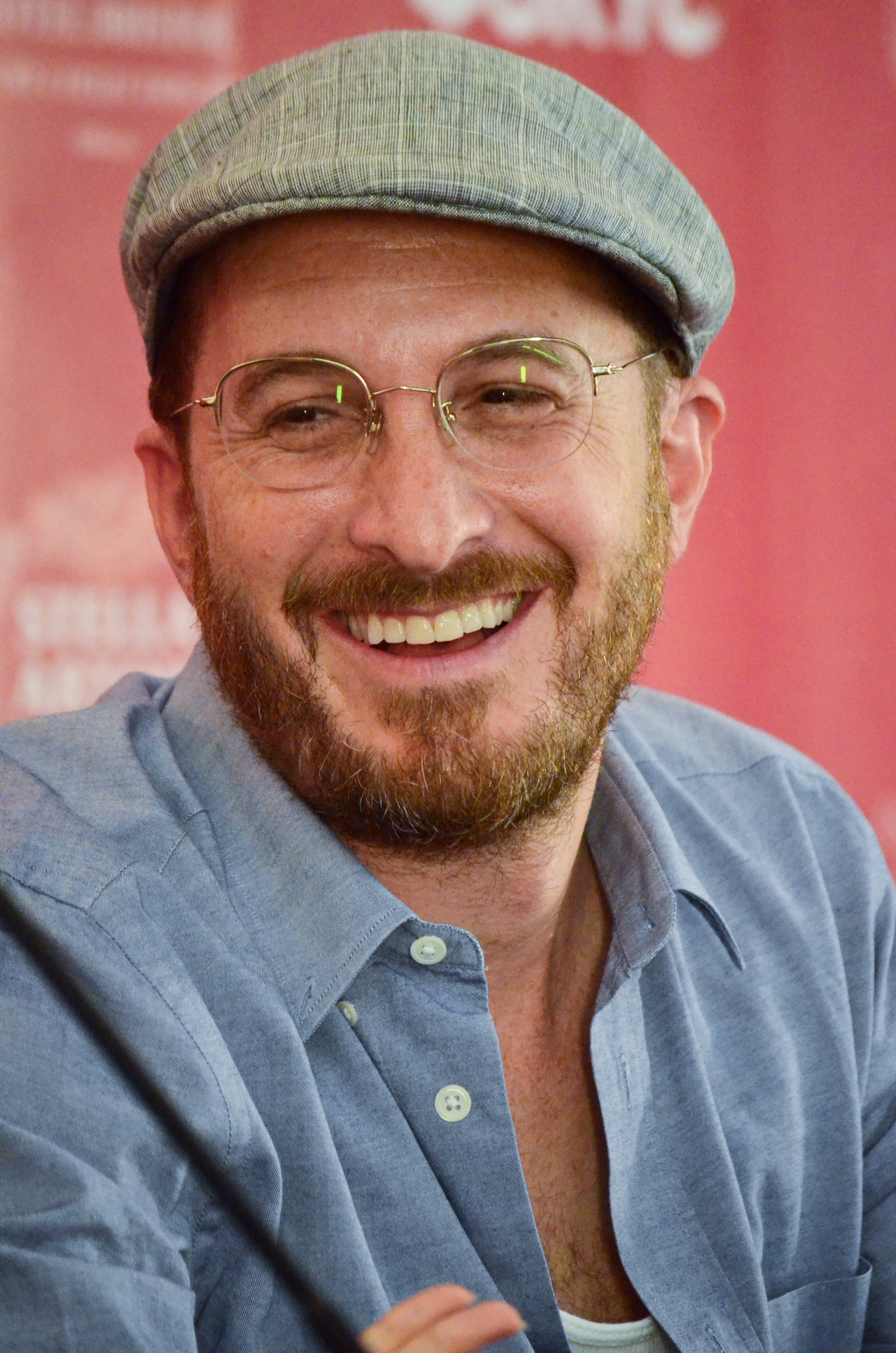
Darren Aronofsky won for Black Swan.

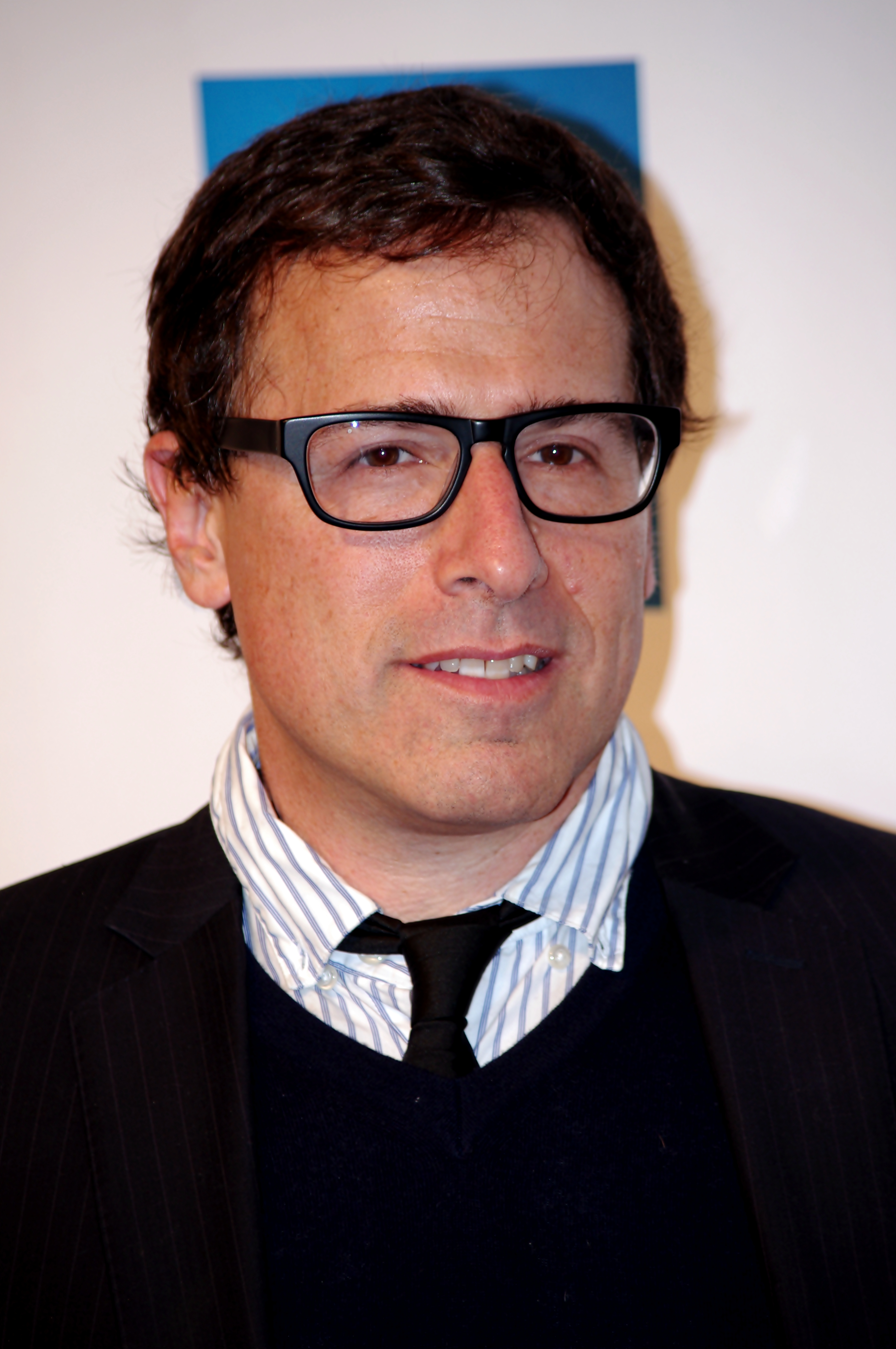
David O. Russell won for Silver Linings Playbook (2012).

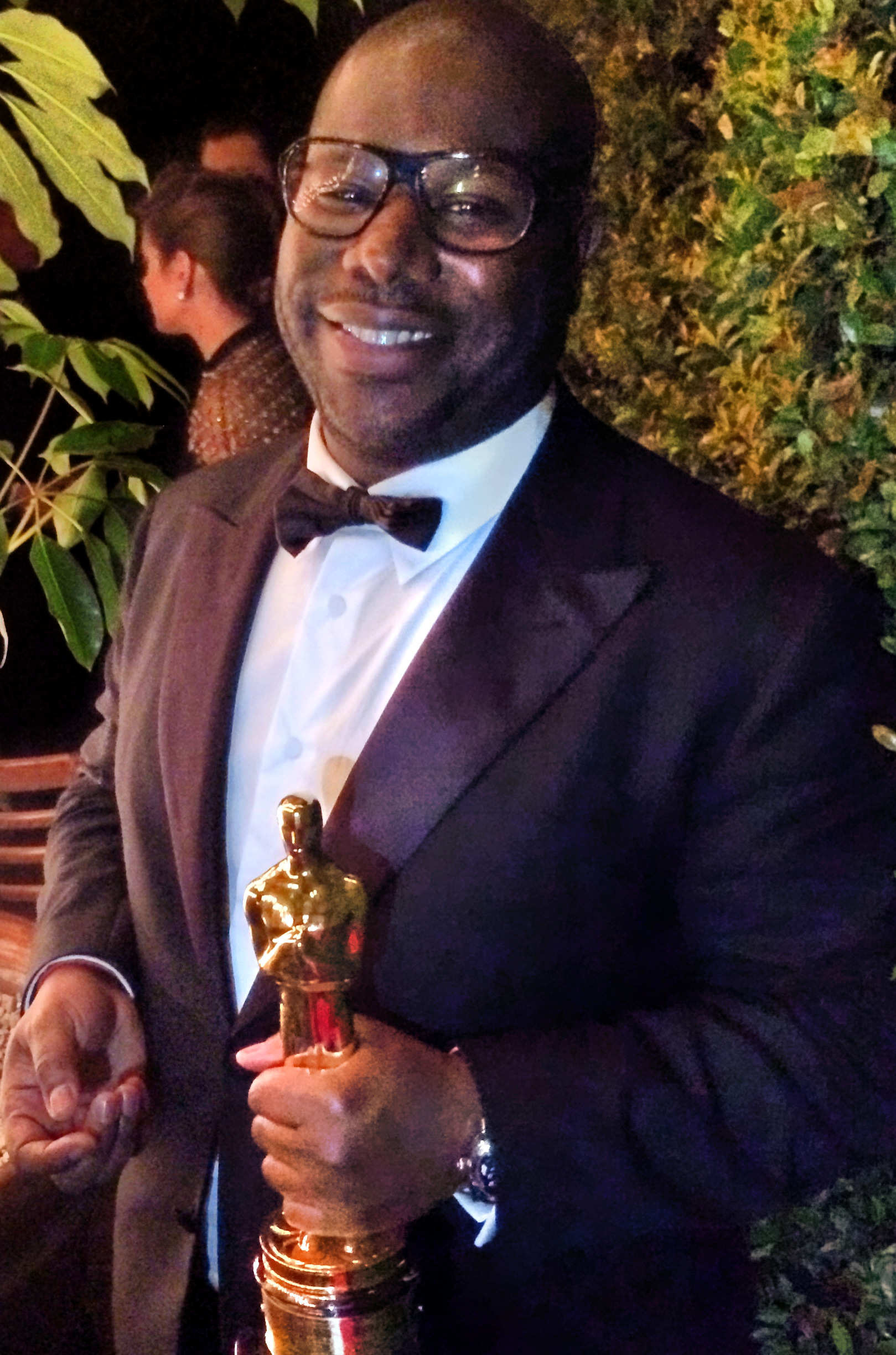
Steve McQueen won for 12 Years a Slave.

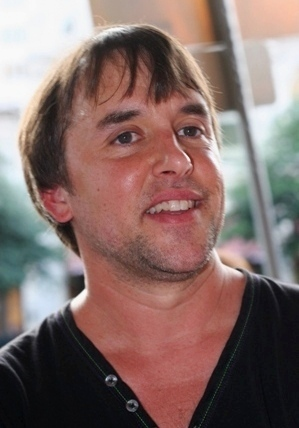
Richard Linklater won for Boyhood.

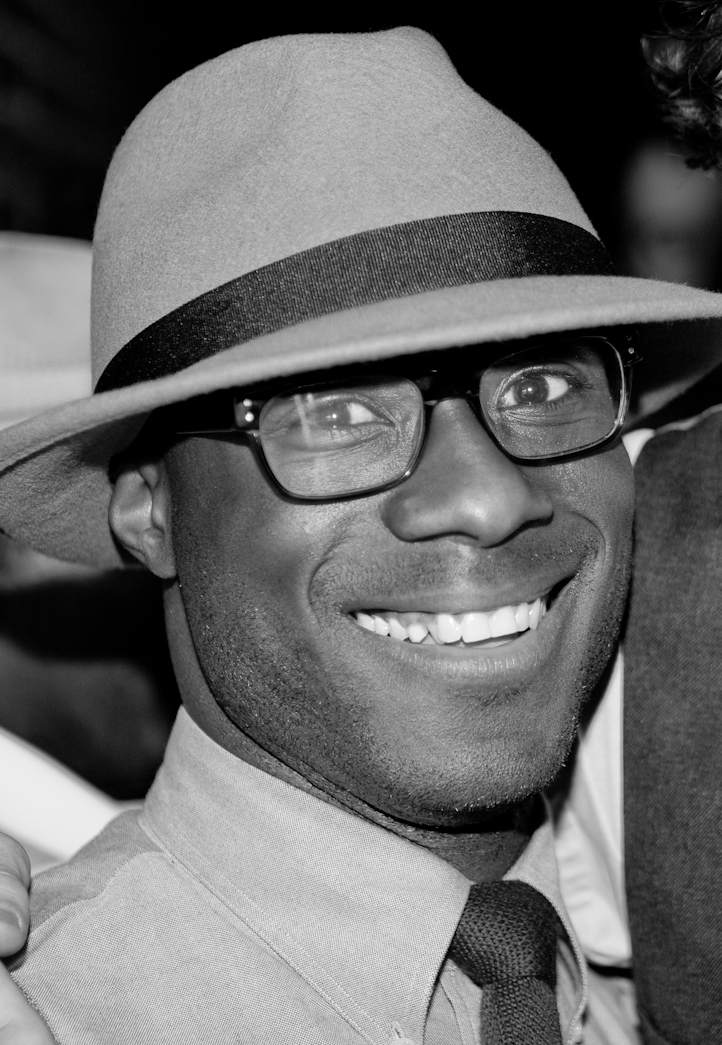
Barry Jenkins won for Moonlight (2006) and If Beale Street Could Talk (2018).

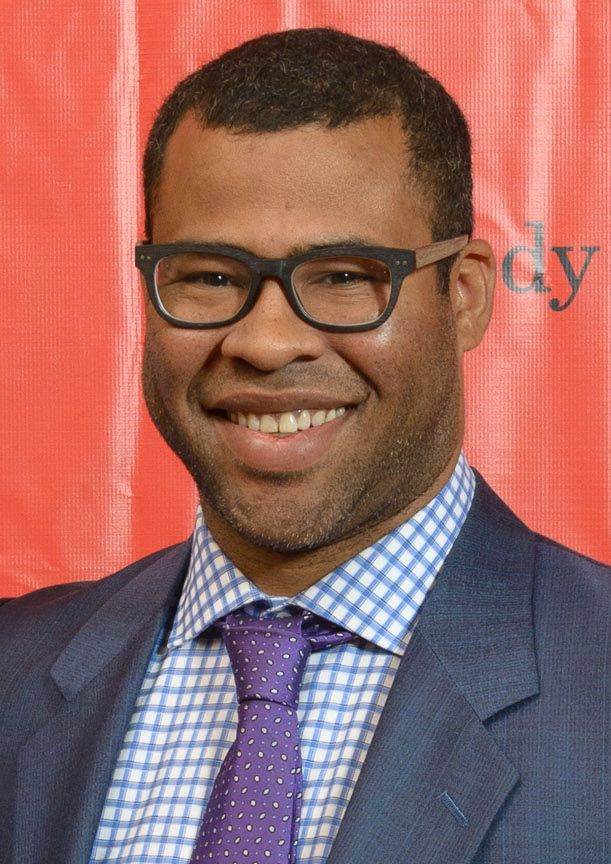
Jordan Peele won for Get Out.

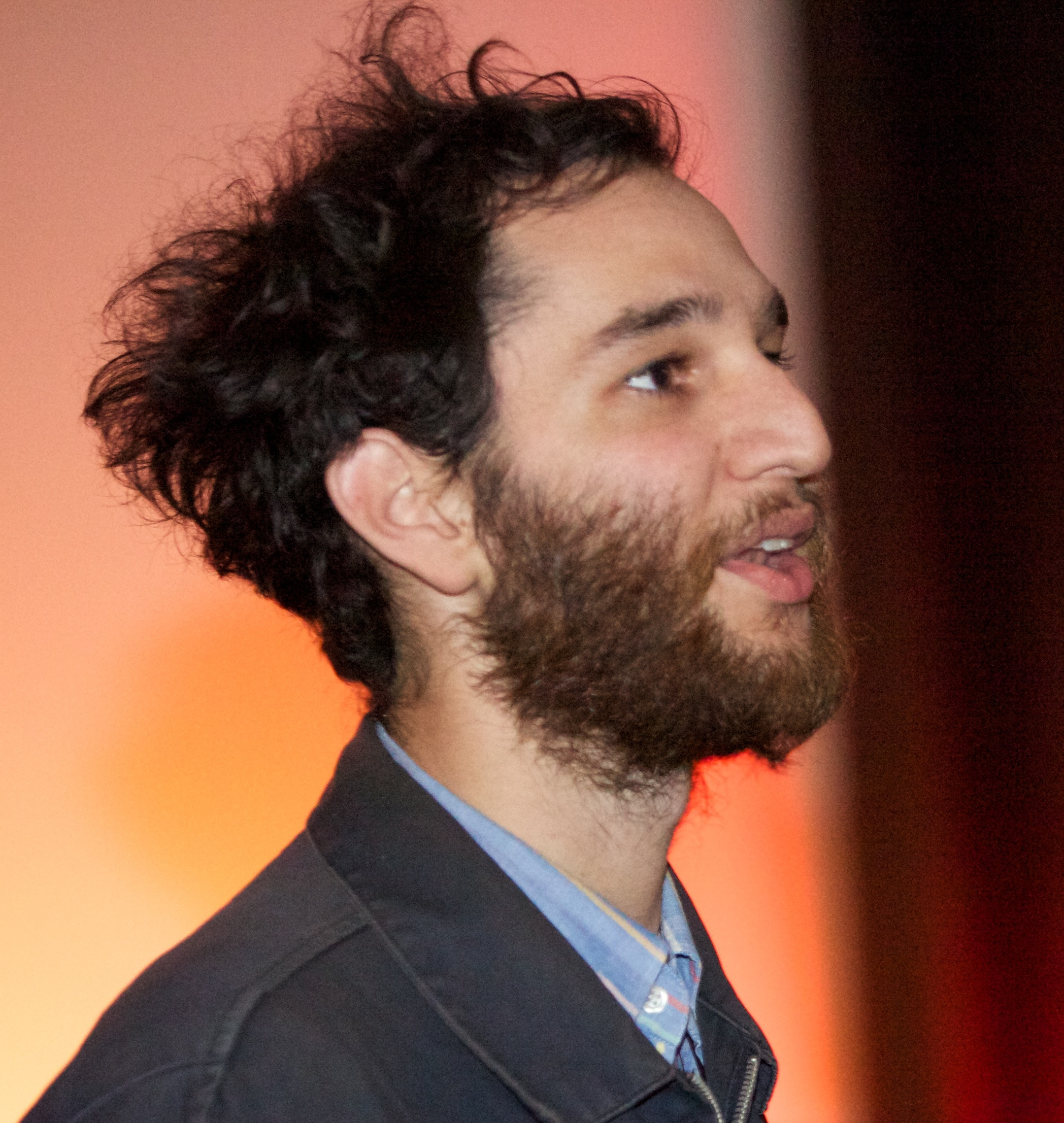
Josh Safdie won with his brother Benny Safdie for Uncut Gems (2019).

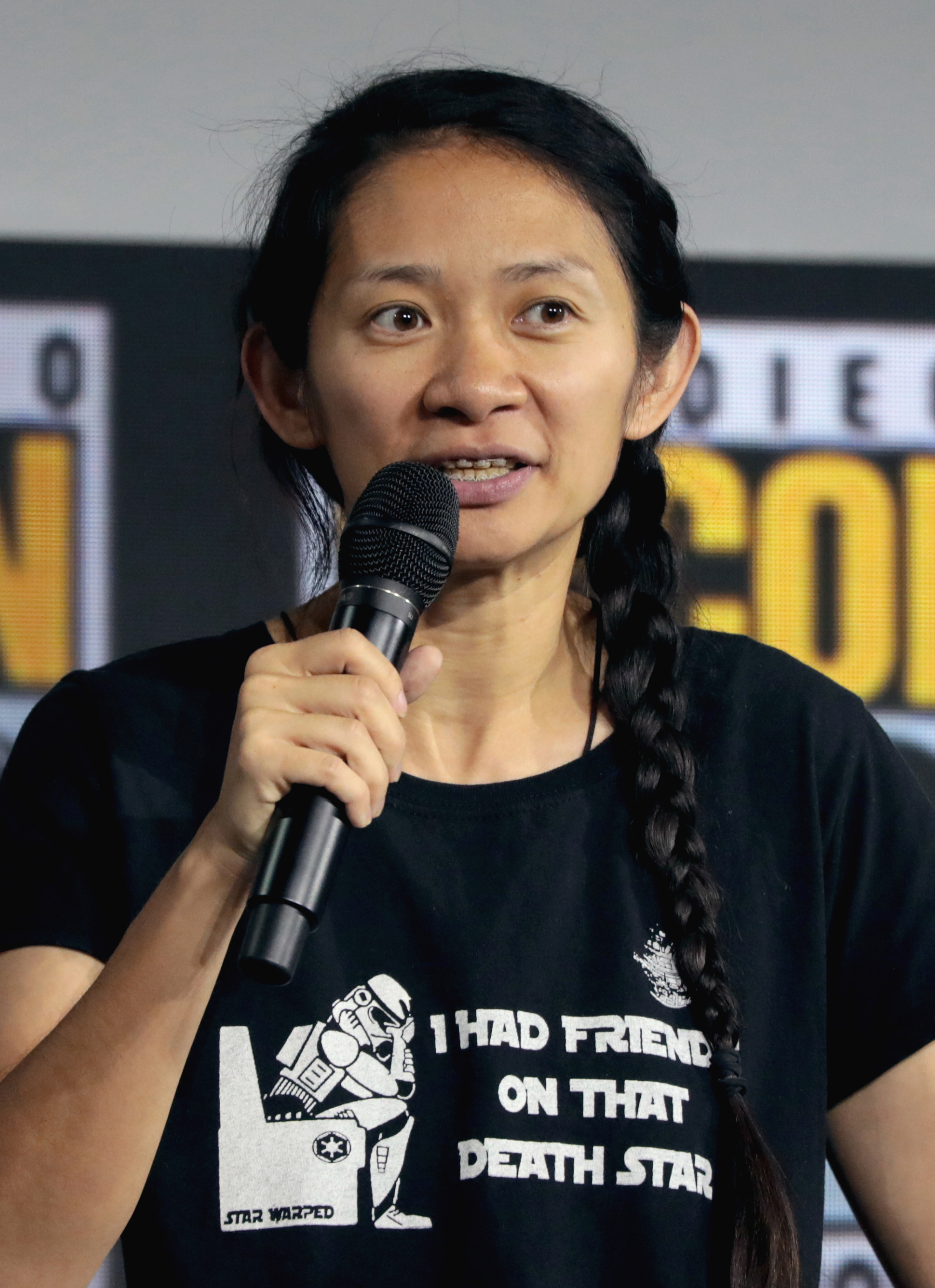
Chloe Zhao won for Nomadland (2020).

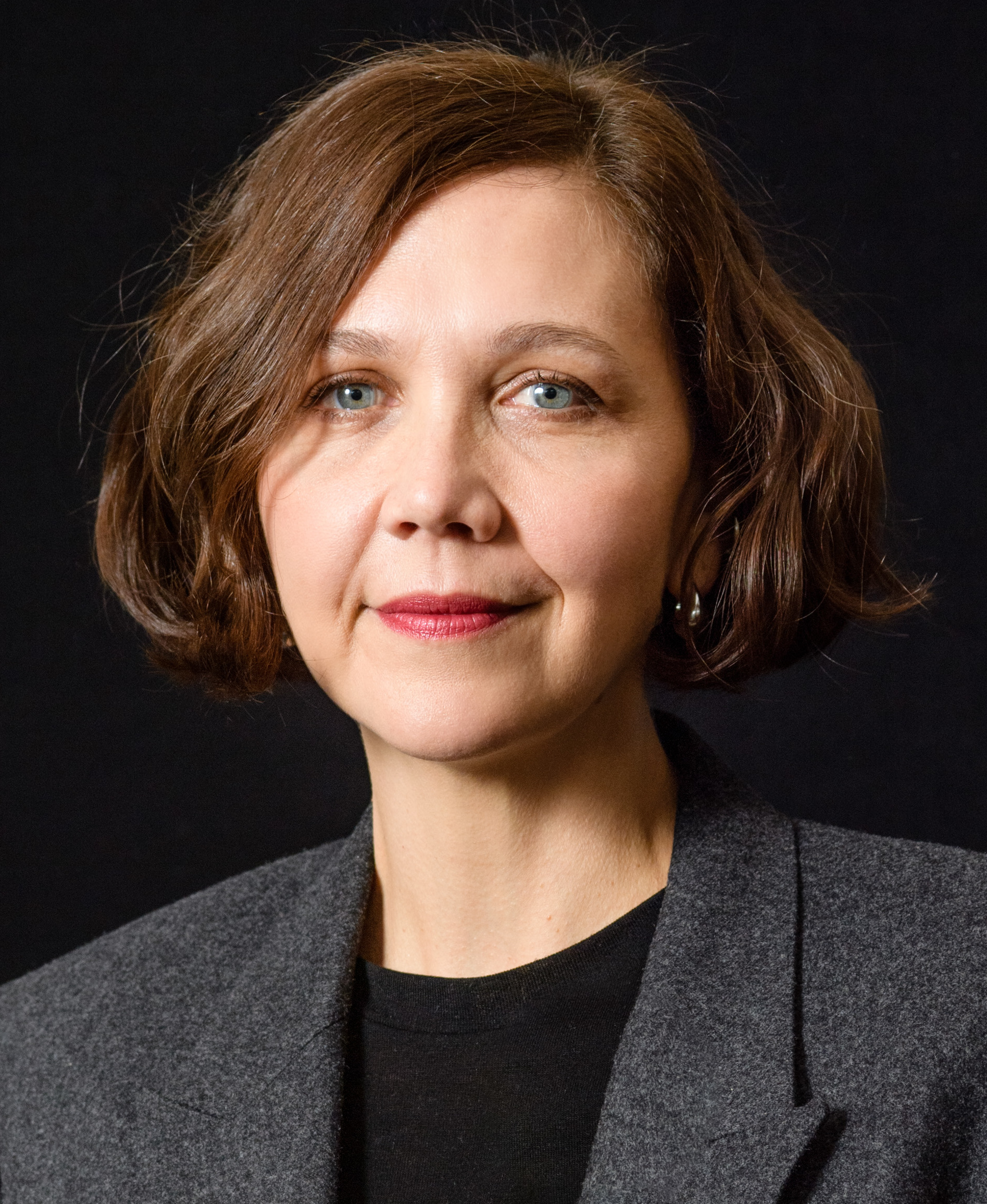
Maggie Gyllenhaal won for The Lost Daughter (2021).

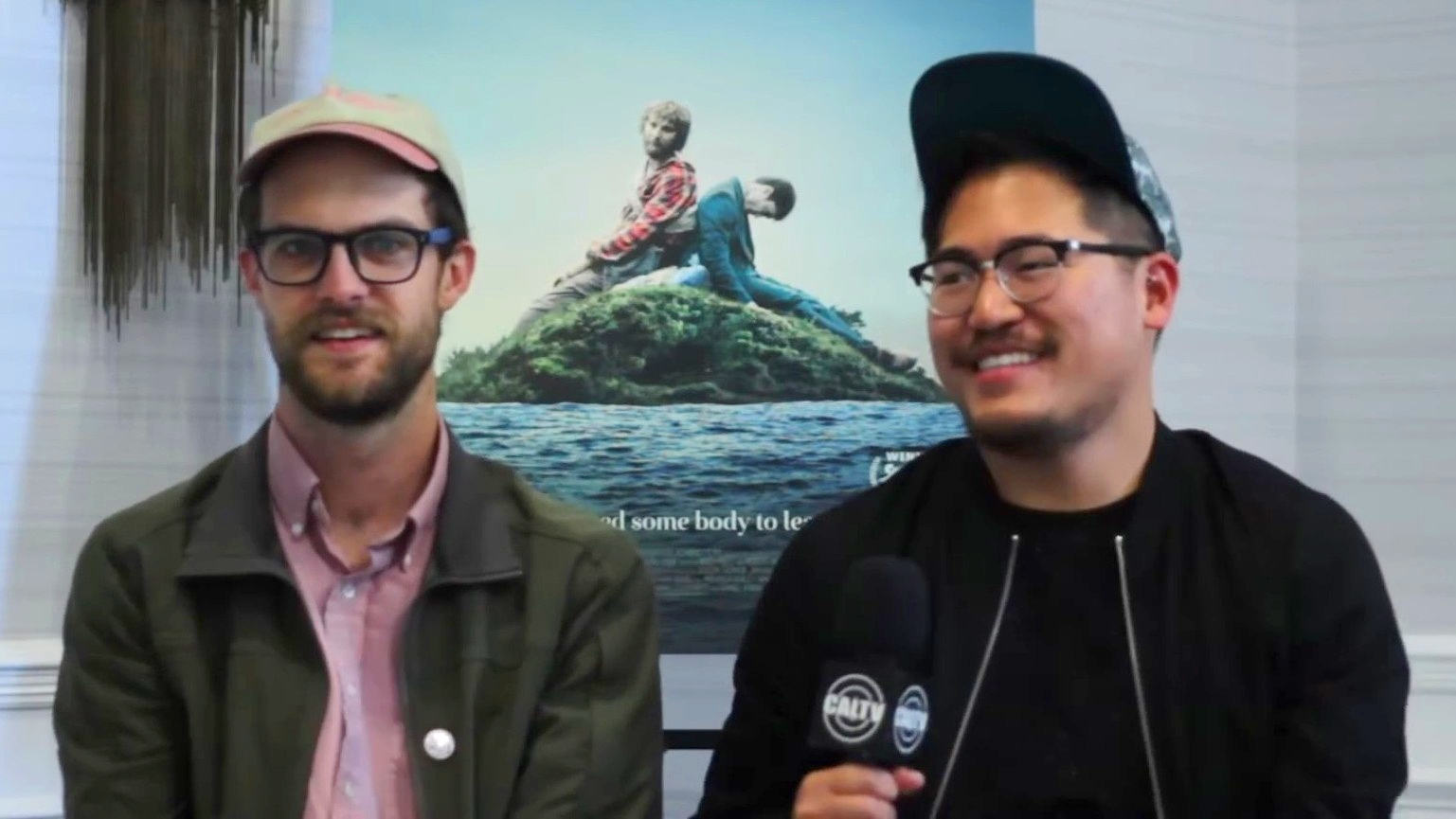
The Daniels won for Everything Everywhere All at Once (2022).

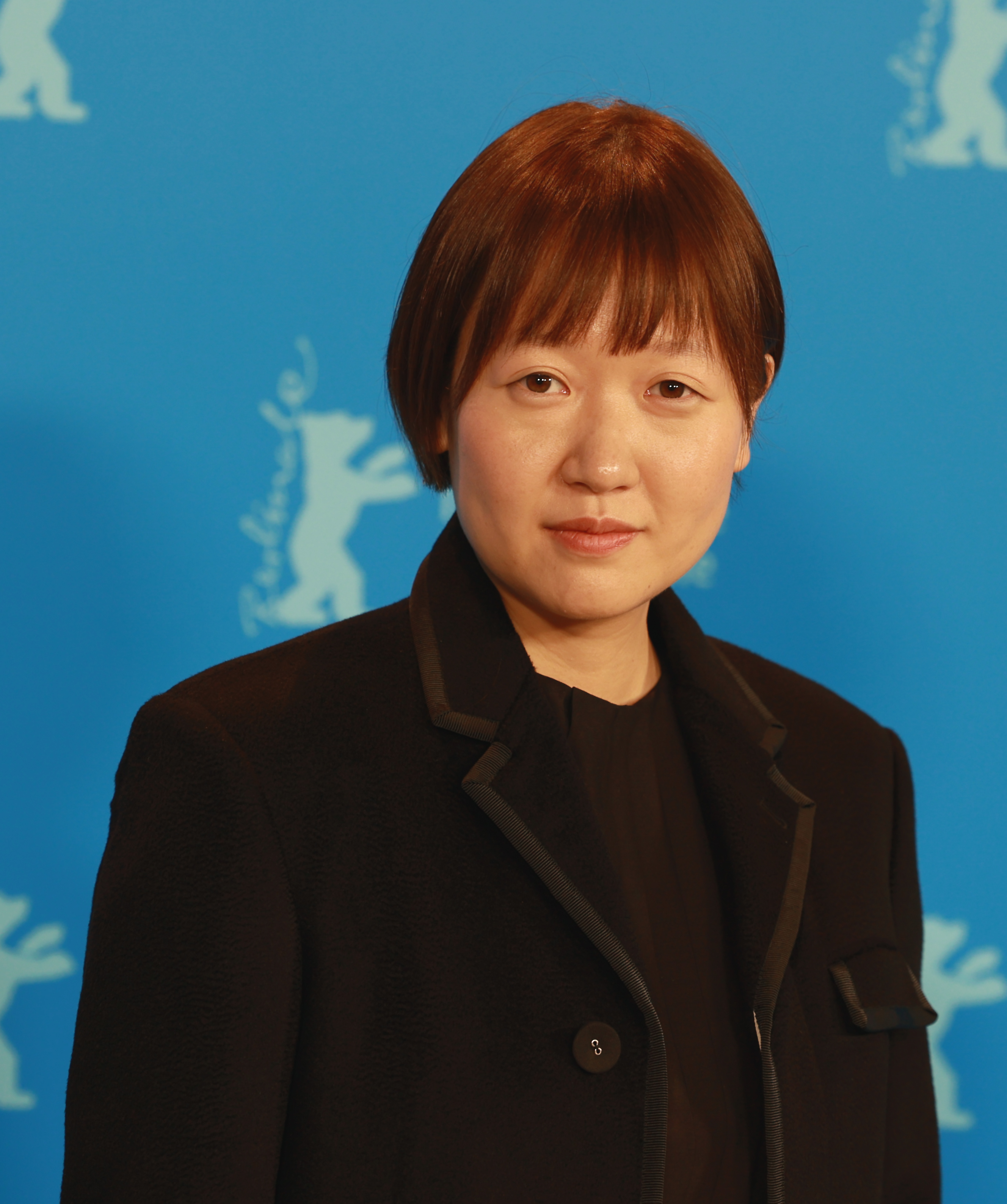
Celine Song won for Past Lives (2023).

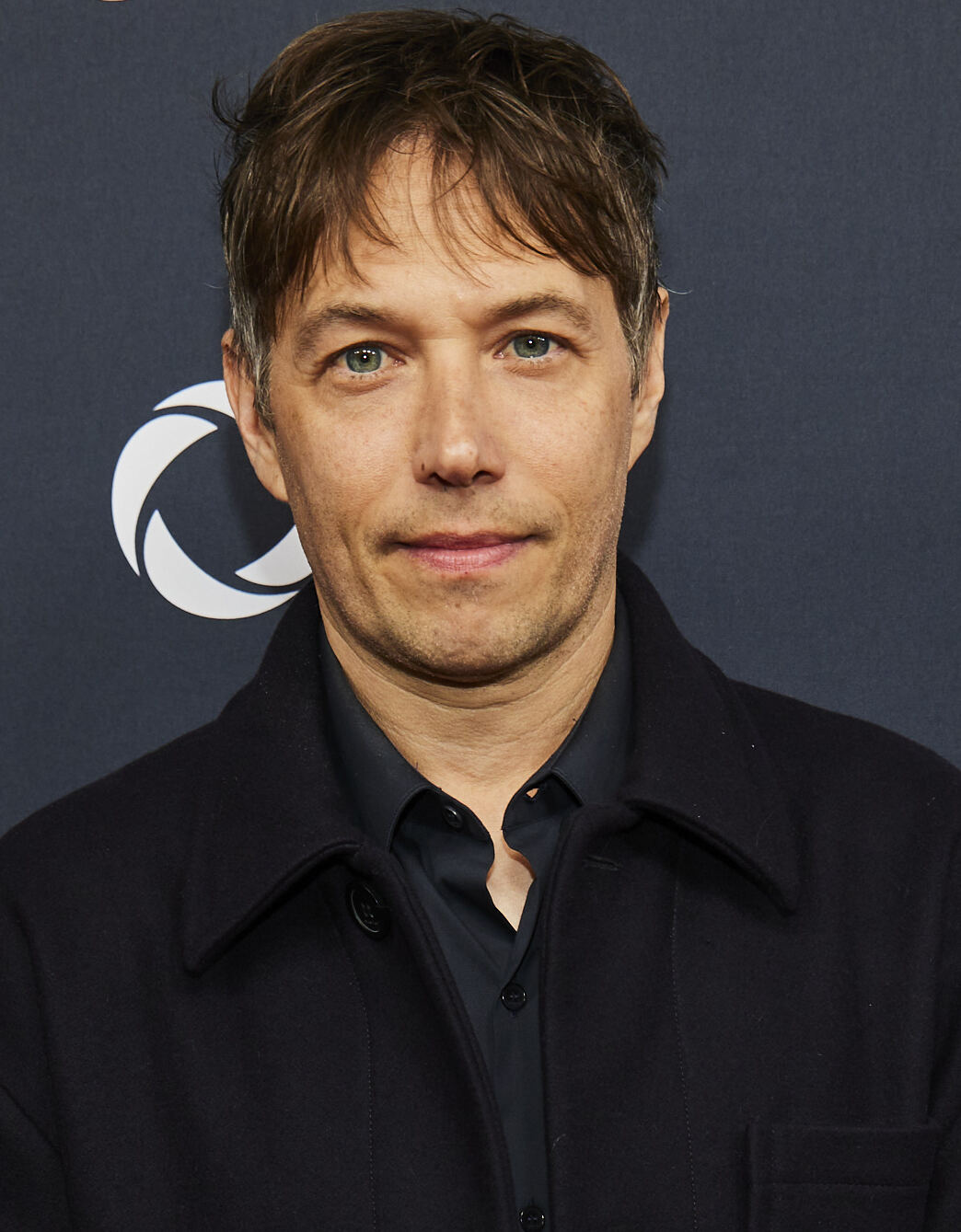
Sean Baker won for Anora (2024).

=== 1980s ===
Year	Recipient(s)	Film
1985	Joel Coen	Blood Simple
1985	Martin Scorsese	After Hours
1985	Joyce Chopra	Smooth Talk
1985	Peter Masterson	The Trip to Bountiful
1986	Oliver Stone	Platoon
1986	Jim Jarmusch	Down by Law
1986	David Lynch	Blue Velvet
1986	Rob Reiner	Stand by Me
1986	Oliver Stone	Salvador
1987	John Huston	The Dead
1987	Jonathan Demme	Swimming to Cambodia
1987	Tim Hunter	River's Edge
1987	Jim McBride	The Big Easy
1987	John Sayles	Matewan
1988	Ramon Menendez	Stand and Deliver
1988	David Burton Morris	Patti Rocks
1988	Errol Morris	The Thin Blue Line
1988	Oliver Stone	Talk Radio
1988	John Waters	Hairspray
1989	Steven Soderbergh	Sex, Lies, and Videotape
1989	Jim Jarmusch	Mystery Train
1989	Charles Lane	Sidewalk Stories
1989	Nancy Savoca	True Love
1989	Gus Van Sant	Drugstore Cowboy

=== 1990s ===
Year	Recipient(s)	Film
1990	Charles Burnett	To Sleep with Anger
1990	Reginald Hudlin	House Party
1990	John McNaughton	Henry: Portrait of a Serial Killer
1990	Allan Moyle	Pump Up the Volume
1990	Michael Roemer	The Plot Against Harry
1991	Martha Coolidge	Rambling Rose
1991	Todd Haynes	Poison
1991	Richard Linklater	Slacker
1991	Gus Van Sant	My Own Private Idaho
1991	Joseph Vásquez	Hangin' with the Homeboys
1992	Carl Franklin	One False Move
1992	Allison Anders	Gas Food Lodging
1992	Abel Ferrara	Bad Lieutenant
1992	Tom Kalin	Swoon
1992	Quentin Tarantino	Reservoir Dogs
1993	Robert Altman	Short Cuts
1993	Ang Lee	The Wedding Banquet
1993	Victor Nuñez	Ruby in Paradise
1993	Robert Rodriguez	El Mariachi
1993	John Turturro	Mac
1994	Quentin Tarantino	Pulp Fiction
1994	John Dahl	Red Rock West
1994	Ang Lee	Eat Drink Man Woman
1994	Roman Polanski	Death and the Maiden
1994	Alan Rudolph	Mrs. Parker and the Vicious Circle
1995	Mike Figgis	Leaving Las Vegas
1995	Michael Almereyda	Nadja
1995	Ulu Grosbard	Georgia
1995	Todd Haynes	Safe
1995	John Sayles	The Secret of Roan Inish
1996	Joel Coen	Fargo
1996	Abel Ferrara	The Funeral
1996	David O. Russell	Flirting with Disaster
1996	Todd Solondz	Welcome to the Dollhouse
1996	Robert M. Young	Caught
1997	Robert Duvall	The Apostle
1997	Larry Fessenden	Habit
1997	Victor Nuñez	Ulee's Gold
1997	Paul Schrader	Touch
1997	Wim Wenders	The End of Violence
1998	Wes Anderson	Rushmore
1998	Todd Haynes	Velvet Goldmine
1998	Lodge Kerrigan	Claire Dolan
1998	Paul Schrader	Affliction
1998	Todd Solondz	Happiness
1999	Alexander Payne	Election
1999	Harmony Korine	Julien Donkey-Boy
1999	Doug Liman	Go
1999	David Lynch	The Straight Story
1999	Steven Soderbergh	The Limey

=== 2000s ===
Year	Recipient(s)	Film
2000	Ang Lee	Crouching Tiger, Hidden Dragon
2000	Darren Aronofsky	Requiem for a Dream
2000	Miguel Arteta	Chuck & Buck
2000	Christopher Guest	Best in Show
2000	Julian Schnabel	Before Night Falls
2001	Christopher Nolan	Memento
2001	Michael Cuesta	L.I.E.
2001	Cheryl Dunye	Stranger Inside
2001	Richard Linklater	Waking Life
2001	John Cameron Mitchell	Hedwig and the Angry Inch
2002	Todd Haynes	Far from Heaven
2002	Joe Carnahan	Narc
2002	Nicole Holofcener	Lovely & Amazing
2002	Bernard Rose	Ivans Xtc
2002	Gus Van Sant	Gerry
2003	Sofia Coppola	Lost in Translation
2003	Shari Springer Berman and Robert Pulcini	American Splendor
2003	Jim Sheridan	In America
2003	Peter Sollett	Raising Victor Vargas
2003	Gus Van Sant	Elephant
2004	Alexander Payne	Sideways
2004	Shane Carruth	Primer
2004	Joshua Marston	Maria Full of Grace
2004	Walter Salles	The Motorcycle Diaries
2004	Mario Van Peebles	Baadasssss!
2005	Ang Lee	Brokeback Mountain
2005	Gregg Araki	Mysterious Skin
2005	Noah Baumbach	The Squid and the Whale
2005	George Clooney	Good Night, and Good Luck
2005	Rodrigo García	Nine Lives
2006	Jonathan Dayton and Valerie Faris	Little Miss Sunshine
2006	Robert Altman	A Prairie Home Companion
2006	Ryan Fleck	Half Nelson
2006	Karen Moncrieff	The Dead Girl
2006	Steven Soderbergh	Bubble
2007	Julian Schnabel	The Diving Bell and the Butterfly
2007	Todd Haynes	I'm Not There
2007	Tamara Jenkins	The Savages
2007	Jason Reitman	Juno
2007	Gus Van Sant	Paranoid Park
2008	Tom McCarthy	The Visitor
2008	Ramin Bahrani	Chop Shop
2008	Jonathan Demme	Rachel Getting Married
2008	Lance Hammer	Ballast
2008	Courtney Hunt	Frozen River
2009	Lee Daniels	Precious
2009	Joel Coen and Ethan Coen	A Serious Man
2009	Cary Fukunaga	Sin Nombre
2009	James Gray	Two Lovers
2009	Michael Hoffman	The Last Station

=== 2010s ===
Year	Recipient(s)	Film
2010	Darren Aronofsky	Black Swan
2010	Danny Boyle	127 Hours
2010	Lisa Cholodenko	The Kids Are All Right
2010	Debra Granik	Winter's Bone
2010	John Cameron Mitchell	Rabbit Hole
2011	Michel Hazanavicius	The Artist
2011	Mike Mills	Beginners
2011	Jeff Nichols	Take Shelter
2011	Alexander Payne	The Descendants
2011	Nicolas Winding Refn	Drive
2012	David O. Russell	Silver Linings Playbook
2012	Wes Anderson	Moonrise Kingdom
2012	Julia Loktev	The Loneliest Planet
2012	Ira Sachs	Keep the Lights On
2012	Benh Zeitlin	Beasts of the Southern Wild
2013	Steve McQueen	12 Years a Slave
2013	Shane Carruth	Upstream Color
2013	J. C. Chandor	All Is Lost
2013	Jeff Nichols	Mud
2013	Alexander Payne	Nebraska
2014	Richard Linklater	Boyhood
2014	Damien Chazelle	Whiplash
2014	Ava DuVernay	Selma
2014	Alejandro G. Iñárritu	Birdman or (The Unexpected Virtue of Ignorance)
2014	David Zellner	Kumiko, the Treasure Hunter
2015	Tom McCarthy	Spotlight
2015	Sean Baker	Tangerine
2015	Cary Joji Fukunaga	Beasts of No Nation
2015	Todd Haynes	Carol
2015	Charlie Kaufman and Duke Johnson	Anomalisa
2015	David Robert Mitchell	It Follows
2016	Barry Jenkins	Moonlight
2016	Andrea Arnold	American Honey
2016	Pablo Larraín	Jackie
2016	Jeff Nichols	Loving
2016	Kelly Reichardt	Certain Women
2017	Jordan Peele	Get Out
2017	Sean Baker	The Florida Project
2017	Jonas Carpignano	A Ciambra
2017	Luca Guadagnino	Call Me by Your Name
2017	Safdie Brothers	Good Time
2017	Chloé Zhao	The Rider
2018	Barry Jenkins	If Beale Street Could Talk
2018	Debra Granik	Leave No Trace
2018	Tamara Jenkins	Private Life
2018	Lynne Ramsay	You Were Never Really Here
2018	Paul Schrader	First Reformed
2019	Safdie Brothers	Uncut Gems
2019	Robert Eggers	The Lighthouse
2019	Alma Har'el	Honey Boy
2019	Julius Onah	Luce
2019	Lorene Scafaria	Hustlers

=== 2020s ===
Year	Recipient(s)	Film
2020	Chloé Zhao	Nomadland
2020	Lee Isaac Chung	Minari
2020	Emerald Fennell	Promising Young Woman
2020	Eliza Hittman	Never Rarely Sometimes Always
2020	Kelly Reichardt	First Cow
2021	Maggie Gyllenhaal	The Lost Daughter
2021	Janicza Bravo	Zola
2021	Lauren Hadaway	The Novice
2021	Mike Mills	C'mon C'mon
2021	Ninja Thyberg	Pleasure
2022	Daniel Kwan and Daniel Scheinert	Everything Everywhere All at Once
2022	Todd Field	Tár
2022	Kogonada	After Yang
2022	Sarah Polley	Women Talking
2022	Halina Reijn	Bodies Bodies Bodies
2023	Celine Song	Past Lives
2023	Andrew Haigh	All of Us Strangers
2023	Todd Haynes	May December
2023	William Oldroyd	Eileen
2023	Ira Sachs	Passages
2024	Sean Baker	Anora
2024	Ali Abbasi	The Apprentice
2024	Brady Corbet	The Brutalist
2024	Alonso Ruizpalacios	La cocina
2024	Jane Schoenbrun	I Saw the TV Glow
2025	Clint Bentley	Train Dreams
2025	Mary Bronstein	If I Had Legs I'd Kick You
2025	Lloyd Lee Choi	Lucky Lu
2025	Ira Sachs	Peter Hujar's Day
2025	Eva Victor	Sorry, Baby

== Multiple nominations and wins ==
=== Multiple nominations ===
Wins	Director
7	Todd Haynes
5	Gus van Sant
4	Ang Lee
4	Alexander Payne
3	Joel Coen (Note: one with Ethan Coen)
3	Richard Linklater
3	Jeff Nichols
3	Ira Sachs
3	Paul Schrader
3	Steven Soderbergh
3	Oliver Stone
3	Sean Baker

=== Multiple wins ===
Wins	Director
2	Barry Jenkins
2	Tom McCarthy
2	Joel Coen (Note: First win was a tie with Martin Scorsese)
2	Ang Lee
2	Alexander Payne
