= Alma's Rainbow =

1994 film by Ayoka Chenzira

- Directed by: Ayoka Chenzira
- Written by: Ayoka Chenzira
- Produced by: Ayoka Chenzira; Howard Brickner; Charles Lane
- Starring: Kim Weston-Moran; Victoria Gabrielle Platt; Mizan Kirby
- Cinematography: Ronald K. Gray
- Edited by: Lillian Benson
- Music by: Jean-Paul Bourelly
- Release date: June 23, 1994
- Running time: 85 minutes
- Country: United States
- Language: English

Alma's Rainbow is an American coming-of-age film directed by Ayoka Chenzira originally released in 1994. A restoration of the film, presented by Julie Dash, was released to theaters and streaming in 2022. The film received positive reviews from critics and was included in Slate's 2023 list of the 75 greatest movies by Black directors.

== Plot ==
Rainbow Gold is a tomboyish Brooklyn teenager who lives with her single mother, Alma, who runs an in-house salon from their brownstone apartment. After school, Rainbow practices her dance moves with her friends, Pepper and Sea Breeze, to land an audition. Later that day, Alma hosts a tenth anniversary party of her salon, inviting her clients including her boyfriend Blue. At the party, Alma's sister and Rainbow's aunt Ruby arrives, who fancies herself as a Josephine Baker-type nightclub singer, from a ten-year absence. Rainbow learns about her aunt's entertainment career, and forges a deeper connection towards her in which she aspires to be like her. When Rainbow's dance partners fail to show for practice, she quits.

Rainbow's grades decline, which angers her mother. Alma confronts her sister for planting dreams of a show business career into Rainbow. It is then revealed that Alma and Ruby had been a singing duo known as the Fabulous Flamingo Sisters. Alma had quit the group to run the salon while Ruby took their earnings to begin anew in Paris. Before long, Ruby arranges a one-woman concert, inviting Rainbow and Alma. Later that night, Ruby wakes her niece from her sleep and critiques her entrance for the audition. The next morning, Rainbow styles herself after her aunt, only to discover that Ruby has left without telling her.

One night, Rainbow dances at a night club and attempts to have sex with Sea Breeze until she learns he does not have a condom. During the same time, Alma has a one-night stand with Blue. Rainbow returns home to find they just had sex. The next morning, Rainbow leaves for her audition while Alma stays behind to scat-dance in her parlor.

== Cast ==
- Kim Weston-Moran as Alma Gold
- Victoria Gabrielle Platt as Rainbow Gold
  - Dakota Jackson-Brewer as Rainbow as a Baby
- Mizan Kirby as Ruby Gold (as Mizan Nunes)
- Lee Dobson as Blue
- Isaiah Washington as Miles
- Jennifer Copeland as Babs
- Keyonn Sheppard as Pepper
- Roger Pickering as Sea Breeze
- Sydney Best as William B. Underdo III
- Sandra Daley as Cynthia
- M. LaVora Perry as Nzingha (as Lavora Perry)
- Murtell Dortch as Beauty Parlour Customer
- Teri Dunbar as Beauty Parlour Customer
- Constance Carter as Beauty Parlour Customer
- Jeanne Nedd as Beauty Parlour Customer
- Ayoka Chenzira as Nun #1
- Lydia Trueheart as Nun #2

== Release and restoration ==
The 35 mm feature film was self-funded by Chenzira and originally debuted in 1994, but did not receive widespread distribution. In 2022, the film was restored in 4K resolution by the Academy Film Archive, Film Foundation, and Milestone Films, and had a theatrical run.

== Critical reception ==
On the review aggregation website Rotten Tomatoes, the film holds an approval rating of 79% with an average rating of 6 out of 10, based on 14 reviews.
