= Drugstore Cowboy =

1989 film by Gus Van Sant

- Theatrical release poster
- Directed by: Gus Van Sant
- Screenplay by: Gus Van Sant; Daniel Yost
- Based on: Drugstore Cowboy; 1990 novel by James Fogle
- Produced by: Karen Murphy; Cary Brokaw; Nick Wechsler
- Starring: Matt Dillon; Kelly Lynch; James Remar; James LeGros; Heather Graham; William Burroughs
- Cinematography: Robert Yeoman
- Edited by: Mary Bauer; Curtiss Clayton
- Music by: Elliot Goldenthal
- Distributed by: International Video Entertainment; Avenue Pictures
- Release dates: September 11, 1989 (Toronto Film Festival); October 6, 1989 (United States)
- Running time: 101 minutes
- Country: United States
- Language: English
- Budget: $2.5 million
- Box office: $4.7 million

Drugstore Cowboy is a 1989 American black comedy film directed by Gus Van Sant. Written by Van Sant and Daniel Yost and based on an autobiographical novel by James Fogle, the film stars Matt Dillon, Kelly Lynch, James LeGros, and Heather Graham. It features supporting performances from James Remar, Max Perlich, Grace Zabriskie, and William S. Burroughs. Based on the then-unpublished novel of the same name by James Fogle, it follows a group of nomadic drug addicts in 1971 Portland, Oregon. It was Van Sant's second film as director, following his 1988 debut Mala Noche.

Principal photography of Drugstore Cowboy took place in Portland in the fall of 1988. The film was theatrically released in the United States on October 6, 1989. It received significant acclaim from film critics, with praise for its performances, realistic portrayal of drug addiction, and its dark humor. It received numerous accolades from film critic associations, including three nominations and four wins at the Independent Spirit Awards. In the years since its original release, the film has developed a cult following.

== Plot ==
In 1971 Portland, Oregon, 26-year-old Bob Hughes leads a nomadic group of drug addicts—his wife Dianne, his best friend Rick, and Rick's teenage girlfriend Nadine—who travel across the Pacific Northwest robbing pharmacies and hospitals to support their habits.

After stealing from a neighborhood pharmacy, they drive home to get high, and are visited by David, a local low-life seeking hard-to-find Dilaudid. Bob claims they have none, but offers to trade him morphine for speed. Initially reluctant, David is persuaded to trade and leaves. Later, police officers led by Detective Gentry, who correctly assumes the group is responsible for the pharmacy robbery, raid and wreck their apartment in an unsuccessful search for the stolen drugs, which Dianne has buried outside.

After moving to another apartment, Bob realizes that Gentry has the group under surveillance. Bob proceeds to devise an elaborate ruse which results in one of the policemen, Trousinski, being mistaken for a peeper by a neighbor who shoots and injures him. The next day, a furious Gentry assaults Bob. Believing a hex has been brought upon them, the group goes "crossroading" and robs a drugstore via an open transom. They find their haul includes vials of pure powdered Dilaudid worth thousands of dollars each. Declaring that "when you're hot, you're hot", Bob convinces Dianne that he should rob a hospital.

During the robbery, Bob is almost captured, and the group returns to their motel to find Nadine has fatally overdosed on a stolen bottle of Dilaudid. According to Bob, she has also put "the worst of all hexes" on them by leaving a hat on her bed. After temporarily storing Nadine's body in the motel's attic, they are alerted by the motel manager that their room was previously booked for a sheriffs' convention, and they must check out. Bob, suffering tremendous anxiety and stress-induced visions of handcuffs and prison, sneaks the body out of the motel in a garment bag. Before burying Nadine in the woods, Bob tells Dianne that he is going to get clean and begin a 21-day methadone treatment program. Shocked by Bob's decision, Dianne refuses to join him.

Bob moves into a long-stay motel in Portland and gets a low-level manufacturing job. At the methadone clinic, he encounters an elderly, drug-addicted priest named Tom, whom Bob remembers from his days as an altar boy. Gentry pays a visit to the motel and says that Trousinski has been making threats against Bob, whom Gentry encourages staying sober. Bob later witnesses David bullying a young man who supposedly owes him money. Bob intervenes and lets the man escape, much to David's frustration.

One night, Dianne arrives at the motel and reveals that she is now in a relationship with Rick, the group's new leader. Dianne asks Bob what happened on the road to make him change his life, and he answers that Nadine's death, the hex she put on them, and the possibility of serious prison time contributed to his decision. He reveals a deal he made with a higher power: if he could get Nadine's body out of the motel, past the cops, and into the ground, he would straighten out his life.

Bob suggests Dianne stay the night with him, but she declines, and gives Bob a package of drugs before leaving. Bob gives the drugs to Tom (who rejects all of them except for a bottle of Dilaudid). Returning to his room, Bob is attacked by two masked figures, one of whom is David, who thinks he has drugs. Bob tells them that he is clean, but David does not believe this and shoots him. A neighbor phones for help, and Bob is loaded onto a stretcher. Asked who shot him, Bob tells Gentry it was "the hat".

While riding in the ambulance, Bob concludes via a voice-over that he has "paid his debt to the hat" and so can return to his former lifestyle without breaking his commitment. He is amused by the perceived irony of the police driving him to a hospital — "the fattest pharmacy in town".

== Cast ==
- Matt Dillon as Bob Hughes
- Kelly Lynch as Dianne Hughes
- James LeGros as Rick
- Heather Graham as Nadine
- Max Perlich as David
- James Remar as Gentry
- Grace Zabriskie as Mrs. Hughes
- William S. Burroughs as Father Tom Murphy
- George Catalano as Trousinski
- Beah Richards as Drug Counselor

== Production ==
=== Casting ===
Tom Waits was Van Sant's first choice to play the lead, although the finance company would not have supported Van Sant if he had cast him. Officially the reason given was that Waits was appearing in another movie they were financing, although Van Sant has said he suspected the Oscar win of Kiss of the Spider Woman, a film they had also financed, had made them want a lead who could win an Oscar. Dillon was ultimately cast in the role of Bob Hughes. To prepare for his role, Dillon met with active and recovered drug addicts.

Kelly Lynch was cast opposite Dillon as Bob's wife, Dianne. Lynch drew on her experience of becoming addicted to opioids after she suffered a serious head-on collision road accident at age twenty, which broke both of her legs (nearly necessitating the amputation of both) and resulted in her being hospitalized for a year. "Instead of stepping me down, [the doctors] completely took me off of them, and I went through a screaming withdrawal that lasted about three days—it was like going into the bowels of hell," Lynch recalled. "So I told my agent that I did know what being a junkie was like, and I’m absolutely right for this part. I went into the audition and got the part the very same day."

James LeGros and Heather Graham, who portray lovers Rick and Nadine, respectively, auditioned for the roles and were cast by Van Sant based on Polaroid photos he took of them. Producer Nick Wechsler recalled: "It was a Warhol-type thing. He would pin them up on the wall, and the energy they were giving him helped him decide who to cast in the movie. When Heather Graham pulled up—her Polaroid just popped."

=== Filming ===
Drugstore Cowboy was filmed mainly around Portland, Oregon, including an area in the Pearl District that used to be a railyard, with a viaduct going over it. The Lovejoy Columns, which formerly held up the viaduct and feature outsider artwork, are featured in the movie. The initial drugstore scene was filmed at the Nob Hill Pharmacy on NW Glisan Street. Prior to filming, Van Sant and the principal actors spent time together doing rehearsals and visiting the filming locations together. Lynch said of the rehearsals: "What Gus wanted from those rehearsals was for us to become a family, so that when we got to shooting 19 year-old Heather Graham wouldn’t be starstruck around Matt Dillon. We had gotten over those things, and we became a coven of actors who were hanging out and saying these lines and playing around together. That I thought was genius."

Principal photography began on September 26, 1988, with a shooting schedule of approximately six weeks.

== Music ==
Drugstore Cowboy: Selections From the Original Motion Picture Soundtrack

Soundtrack album by Elliot Goldenthal
- Released: 1989
- Genres: Avant-garde; rock; electronic; progressive
- Length: 36:14
- Labels: Novus 3077-2-N13; RCA 3077-2-N
- Producer: Elliot Goldenthal

Elliot Goldenthal chronology
Blank Generation (1980)	Drugstore Cowboy: Selections From the Original Motion Picture Soundtrack (1989)	Pet Sematary (1989)

The soundtrack includes songs that are contemporaneous with the film's setting, along with original music by Elliot Goldenthal. It is one of his earliest works; in it, he does not use an orchestra, but a whole range of instruments treated in a synthesizer. The score and soundtrack were also the first that Goldenthal worked on with Richard Martinez, a music producer whose "computer expertise and sound production assistance" became the basis for frequent subsequent collaborations. AllMusic rated this soundtrack three stars out of five.

Side one

1. "For All We Know" (4:58) – Abbey Lincoln
2. "Little Things" (2:25) – Bobby Goldsboro
3. "Put a Little Love in Your Heart" (2:38) – Jackie DeShannon
4. "Psychotic Reaction" (3:06) – Count Five
5. "Judy in Disguise" (2:56) – John Fred & His Playboy Band
6. "The Israelites" (2:47) – Desmond Dekker & The Aces

Side two

7. "Yesterday's Jones" (0:45)
8. "Morpheus Ascending" (1:17)
9. "Monkey Frenzy" (2:20)
10. "Wonder Waltz" (1:19)
11. "White Gardenia" (1:54)
12. "The Floating Hex" (1:37)
13. "Mr. F. Wadd" (1:02)
14. "Elegy Mirror" (0:48)
15. "Panda the Dog" (0:51)
16. "Heist and Hat" (1:36)
17. "Strategy Song" (2:04)
18. "Bob's New Life" (2:48)
19. "Clockworks" (0:32)
20. "Cage Iron" (1:03)
21. "Goodnight Nadine" (1:28)

== Release ==
Drugstore Cowboy opened at the Toronto International Film Festival on September 11, 1989. It was released theatrically in the United States on October 6, 1989.

=== Home media ===
IVE Entertainment released the film on VHS and LaserDisc in 1990. Artisan Entertainment released the film on DVD in 2000. The Criterion Collection released the film on 4K UHD Blu-ray in February 2025.

== Reception ==
=== Box office ===
Drugstore Cowboy grossed $4,729,352 at the United States box office against its $2.5 million budget.

=== Critical response ===
Drugstore Cowboy received significant acclaim from film critics. On the review aggregator website Rotten Tomatoes, 94% of 33 critics' reviews are positive. The website's consensus reads: "Drugstore Cowboy takes us into a violent, transient world with cool, contemplative style." Metacritic, which uses a weighted average, assigned the film a score of 82 out of 100, based on 15 critics, indicating "universal acclaim".

In his print review for the Chicago Sun-Times, Roger Ebert gave the film 4 stars out of a possible 4. He described Dillon as offering "one of the great recent American movie performances" and highlighted how the film was successful by portraying the characters not as "bad people [but] sick people" who formed an unorthodox family to cope with "the desperation in their lives". Ebert also singled out Burroughs's cameo as "a guest appearance by Death". Sheila Benson of the Los Angeles Times uniformly praised the film's "hauntingly beautiful performances" and praised its dark humor as "laconic" and "macabre," likening the screenplay to that of Straight Time (1978). Hal Hinson of The Washington Post also commented on the film's humor, writing that the screenplay "is steeped in a kind of narcotic hilarity. There's a lag time built into the jokes, a holding period, that's keyed to the reactions of the characters' slowed-down responses. Watching it, you feel witness to a real-life, slow-motion farce-farce in a world without time." He also praised the performances for "their affectlessness expressive[ness]."

Stephen Holden of The New York Times noted the film's visceral tone, writing, "The way of life portrayed in the film is jarring in its abrupt changes of rhythms, as the somnolent lulls of consumption are broken by ferocious spasms of violence and paranoia," but also highlighted its subtle dark humor: "Because the characters are so self-absorbed and their lives so totally unproductive, there is an element of comic absurdity in their continual desperation. After Nadine dies, their motel happens to become the site of a convention of state policemen. With the place aswarm with overweight law officers in uniform, the urgent problem of removing the body is treated as deadpan black comedy." Variety similarly praised the film's realistic portrayal of drug addiction, noting that "no previous drug-themed film has [such] honesty or originality."

The film was listed on the Top Ten lists of both Gene Siskel and Roger Ebert for 1989.

=== Accolades ===
Institution	Year	Category	Recipient(s)	Result	Ref.
Berlin International Film Festival	1990	Forum of New Cinema	Gus Van Sant	Won	
Chicago Film Critics Association Awards	1990	Best Film	Drugstore Cowboy	Nominated	
Independent Spirit Awards	1990	Best Feature	Drugstore Cowboy	Nominated	
Independent Spirit Awards	1990	Best Director	Gus Van Sant	Nominated	
Independent Spirit Awards	1990	Best Cinematography	Robert Yeoman	Won	
Independent Spirit Awards	1990	Best Screenplay	Gus Van Sant; Daniel Yost	Won	
Independent Spirit Awards	1990	Best Female Lead	Kelly Lynch	Nominated	
Independent Spirit Awards	1990	Best Male Lead	Matt Dillon	Won	
Independent Spirit Awards	1990	Best Supporting Female	Heather Graham	Nominated	
Independent Spirit Awards	1990	Best Supporting Male	Max Perlich	Won	
Los Angeles Film Critics Association	1989	Best Screenplay	Gus Van Sant; Daniel Yost	Won	
Los Angeles Film Critics Association	1989	Best Film	Drugstore Cowboy	Nominated	
Los Angeles Film Critics Association	1989	Best Music	Elliot Goldenthal	Nominated	
National Society of Film Critics	1989	Best Director	Gus Van Sant	Won	
National Society of Film Critics	1989	Best Film	Drugstore Cowboy	Won	
National Society of Film Critics	1989	Best Screenplay	Gus Van Sant; Daniel Yost	Nominated	
New York Film Critics Circle	1989	Best Screenplay	Gus Van Sant; Daniel Yost	Won	
PEN Center USA Literary Awards	1990	Best Screenplay Adaptation	Gus Van Sant	Won	

== See also ==
- List of cult films
