= James Fogle =

American criminal and author of autobiographical novel Drugstore Cowboy (1936–2012)

James Fogle (September 29, 1936 – August 23, 2012) was the American author of the autobiographical novel Drugstore Cowboy, which became the basis for the film of the same name. He was born in Elcho, Wisconsin.

Fogle was in prison at the time of the film's release in 1989. A career criminal with a sixth-grade education, Fogle had been in trouble with the law many times starting in his teens and throughout the rest of his life. On May 27, 2010, Fogle was arrested with another man for robbing a drugstore in Redmond, Washington. He was held on $500,000 bail as he awaited trial.

Fogle was arrested again for robbing a Seattle pharmacy in 2011. On Friday, March 4, 2011, he was sentenced to 15 years and nine months in prison. On August 23, 2012, Fogle died of mesothelioma at the age of 75 in the state Monroe Correctional Complex in Monroe, Washington. Though Fogle wrote many short stories and novels, the only one that has been published is Drugstore Cowboy with the rest in the possession of Daniel Yost, a screenwriter and Fogle's friend.

== Bibliography ==
- Adventure in Madness (short story)
- Drugstore Cowboy (novel) (1990)
- Doing It All (novel)
- Needle in the Sky (novel)
- Satan's Sandbox (novel)
- House of Worms (novel)
- Drugstore Cowboy Rides Again (Backside of a Mirror) (novel)
- Reckless Endearment
- Harse Apples
- Gold Gold Gold
- The Just and the Unjust
- Bird's Nest on the Ground (short story)
