= True Identity =

1991 film by Charles Lane

- Theatrical release poster
- Directed by: Charles Lane
- Written by: Andy Breckman
- Produced by: Carol Baum; Teri Schwartz
- Starring: Lenny Henry; Frank Langella
- Cinematography: Thomas E. Ackerman
- Edited by: Kent Beyda
- Music by: Marc Marder
- Production company: Touchstone Pictures
- Distributed by: Buena Vista Pictures Distribution
- Release date: August 23, 1991
- Running time: 93 minutes
- Country: United States
- Language: English
- Budget: $15 million
- Box office: $4,693,236 (US)

True Identity is a 1991 American comedy film directed by Charles Lane and starring Lenny Henry, Frank Langella and Anne-Marie Johnson. The plot revolves around a black man (Henry), who disguises himself as a white man to escape the mob.

== Plot ==
A struggling black actor named Miles Pope is on a plane ride home from a failed acting audition. Miles meets a producer named Leland Carver who accidentally reveals his mafia ties when he believes that their plane is about to crash. However, the plane does not crash and Miles is the only man who knows Leland's past. To escape, Miles persuades his makeup artist friend Duane to transform him into a Caucasian male.

As Miles is packing his bags to get out of town, a hitman walks in and a struggle ensues. Miles kills the hitman, but through a comedy of errors he is mistaken for the hitman. Miles must assume a parade of identities to stay one step ahead of the mafia on his trail.

== Cast ==
- Lenny Henry as Miles Pope
- Frank Langella as Leland Carver
- Anne-Marie Johnson as Kristi
- James Earl Jones as himself
- Charles Lane as Duane
- Peggy Lipton as Rita
- Melvin Van Peebles as Taxi Driver
- J. T. Walsh as Houston
- Andreas Katsulas as Anthony
- Austin Pendleton as Othello's Director
- Michael McKean as Harvey Cooper
- Bill Raymond as Grunfield
- Darnell Williams as Tyler
- Christopher Collins as Frank LaMotta
- Ruth Brown as Martha
- Fantasia Owens as Ruth

== Reception ==
The film received mixed reviews. On Rotten Tomatoes it has an approval rating of 43% based on reviews from 7 critics.

Caryn James of The New York Times said that Lane's direction was "tame and conventional" and that although Henry had "obvious" talent, True Identity does not take enough advantage of it". Lenny Henry commented on the film retrospectively in 2010: "When I went to America to do True Identity in 1991, I realised they had their own Richard Pryor, they didn’t need me pretending to be Richard Pryor, so I had a massive career rethink." Audiences polled by CinemaScore gave the film an average grade of "B−" on an A+ to F scale.

The film was not a box office success.
