= Charles Lane (filmmaker) =

American actor and filmmaker (born 1953)

- Born: December 26, 1953 (age 72); Bronx, New York City
- Education: State University of New York at Purchase (1980)
- Occupations: Actor, filmmaker
- Notable work: Sidewalk Stories
- Children: 1

Charles Lane (born December 26, 1953) is an American actor and filmmaker.

== Biography ==
While attending Purchase College as a film student, he made a short titled A Place in Time based on the famous Kitty Genovese incident. This short gained him a certain amount of attention, including a Student Academy Award win.

Lane then directed and starred in the feature film True Identity, a vehicle for British comedian Lenny Henry funded by the Walt Disney Company. He wrote, directed and starred in 1989's Sidewalk Stories, a black-and-white feature about a homeless street artist who becomes the guardian of a small girl after her father is murdered. The nearly silent film was an homage to Charlie Chaplin's The Kid and was a critical favorite. It won several festival awards, including the Prix du Publique at the Cannes Film Festival, where its 12-minute ovation set a new record. He also received three nominations at the Film Independent Spirit Awards: Best Director, Best First Feature and Best Male Lead On its 25th anniversary in 2014, Sidewalk Stories was digitally remastered and rescreened at the Cannes Film Festival and Tribeca Film Festival.

Lane also had a starring role in the Mario Van Peebles film Posse, as Weezie, often the butt of jokes.

He has worked with James Earl Jones, Lenny Henry, and Frank Langella and offered one of the first film roles to The Sopranos actress Edie Falco. Lane often casts various friends and family in his films, including brother Gerald, friend George, and daughter Nicole Alysia.

== Filmography ==
=== Film ===
Year	Title	Role	Notes
1977	A Place in Time	The Artist	Short film also writer and director
1989	Sidewalk Stories	Artist	also writer, director and editor
1991	True Identity	Duane	also director
1993	Posse	"Weezie"	
2009	The Mind	Stan, The Landlord	
2014	Mr. Nice		Episode 4: cinematographer
2015	Yellow Tape		writer and director

=== Television ===
Year	Title	Role	Notes
1993	American Playhouse: Hallelujah	director	

== Awards and nominations ==
Year	Award	Nominated work	Result
1976	Student Academy Awards	A Place in Time	Won
1989	Cannes Film Festival Prix du Public	Sidewalk Stories	Won
1990	Independent Spirit Award for Best Director	Sidewalk Stories	Nominated
1990	Independent Spirit Award for Best First Feature	Sidewalk Stories	Nominated
1990	Independent Spirit Award for Best Male Lead	Sidewalk Stories	Nominated
1990	Würzburg International Film Weekend Audience Favorite	Sidewalk Stories	Won
