= Sidewalk Stories =

- Directed by: Charles Lane
- Written by: Charles Lane
- Produced by: Palm Pictures
- Starring: Charles Lane; Nicole Alysia
- Cinematography: Bill Dill
- Edited by: Charles Lane; Ann Stein
- Music by: Marc Marder
- Distributed by: Island Pictures
- Release dates: November 1989 (Limited); January 1990 (General)
- Running time: 97 minutes
- Country: United States
- Language: Silent

Sidewalk Stories is a 1989 American low-budget, nearly silent movie directed by and starring Charles Lane. The black-and-white film tells the story of a young African American man raising a small child after her father is murdered. The film is somewhat reminiscent of Charlie Chaplin's 1921 feature The Kid. The film was televised by PBS as well as saw limited exposure on VHS and cable television in the 1990s.

In October 2014, Sidewalk Stories was released on DVD and Blu-ray courtesy of Kino Lorber.

== Plot ==
An impecunious and homeless young black sidewalk artist in the Manhattan slums finds himself in charge of a three-year-old girl who has been orphaned. Though with severely limited prospects for being able to care for the precious and vulnerable child, the artist manages through pluck and luck to protect, shelter and feed her through a series of adverse events and adventures during which he displays a striking ingenuity and himself attracts a lover. The bond between him and the child grows in the course of these events until the artist sees a picture of the child on a milk carton in an ad by the child's widowed mother, to whom he returns the child, refusing the money she offers him. The film ends in a night scene at a street trash fire around which an assortment of bums and derelicts warm themselves in winter while panhandling passersby, conveying a message that there exists among the downtrodden an admirable nobility of spirit.

== Cast ==
- Charles Lane - The Artist
- Tom Alpern - Bookseller
- Darnell Williams- The Father
- Nicole Alysia - Child
- Edwin Anthony - Penny Pincher 1
- Michael Baskin - Doorman/Cop
- Jeff Bates - Police Officer 2
- Angel Cappellino - Bully's Mother
- Jeffrey Carpentier - Homeless Native American
- Alexander Takazauckas - Homeless man with cart
- John Carr - S.O.B. Man
- Vince Castelano - Child Customer 3
- Jimmy Clohessy - Precinct Cop 2
- Robert Clohessy - Alley Tough 1
- Sandye Wilson- Girlfriend
- Deena Engle - Park Mother 1
- Ellia English - Bag Lady
- Edie Falco - Woman in Carriage
- Trula Hoosier - Mother

== Reception ==
Rotten Tomatoes gives the film a rating of 79% from 42 reviews. The consensus summarizes: "Sidewalk Stories' sweetness is somewhat undermined by the movie's broad approach, but it remains a comedy with heart -- and something to say."
