= Paturi (surname) =

Paturi (Telugu: పాతూరి) is a Telugu surname. Notable people with the surname include:

- Paturi Nagabhushanam (1907–1987), Indian educator
- Paturi Paul Williams (1943–2016), Indian civil servant
- Paturi Rajagopala Naidu (1920–1997), Indian activist and politician
- Ravi Paturi (1966–2012), Indian academic
