= Judy Irola =

American cinematographer (1943–2021)

- Born: Judith Carol Irola; November 23, 1943; Fresno, California, U.S.
- Died: February 21, 2021 (aged 77); Los Angeles, California, U.S.
- Occupation: Cinematographer

Judith Carol Irola (November 23, 1943 – February 21, 2021) was an American cinematographer, film producer, and director. The third woman accepted into the American Society of Cinematographers, she was head of the cinematography department at USC School of Cinematic Arts for 15 years and held the Conrad Hall Chair in Cinematography there. Irola co-founded a National Association of Broadcast Employees and Technicians branch in San Francisco in 1969, and was a founding member of the short-lived Cine Manifest film collective in 1972.

== Early life ==
Judith Carol Irola was born in rural Fresno, California, on November 23, 1943. Her parents, Barbara and Johnny Irola, were sheep farmers, and her grandparents had emigrated to the United States in 1917 from the Basque region of Spain. She had two younger sisters, Jeanne and Barbara Jo. The three sisters would go to the Saturday matinees at the local movie theatre. She later documented their upbringing on the farm in her 2014 short documentary The Sheepherder's Daughters.

Irola dropped out of college to go to the Central California Commercial College to learn secretarial skills. She then used these in jobs in London and Seville. In 1965, she joined the Peace Corps and, after three months training in the US, spent two years in Niger where she helped improve water and sanitation systems, build schools and provide vital health education. She subsequently revisited this period in her 2010 documentary Niger '66: A Peace Corps Diary.

After Niger, Irola returned to San Francisco and started work in the offices of KQED-TV. She started to work in their film department at the weekends, and was eventually hired by them as a full time camera person.

== Career in film ==
Whilst in the KQED-TV film department, Irola co-founded a Bay area branch of the National Association of Broadcast Employees and Technicians. Initially a shop-steward, she went on become the branch's President.

In 1972, KQED-TV disbanded its film department. Irola co-founded Cine Manifest, a Marxist film collective, with Gene Corr, Peter Gessner, John Hanson, Stephen Lighthill, Rob Nilsson and Steve Wax. She was the only woman in the collective. They made documentaries, public service announcements for Amnesty International and two feature films. Irola revisited the collective with her 2006 documentary feature film Cine Manifest. Irola was cinematographer on Northern Lights, their first feature film. It won the Caméra d'Or at the 1979 Cannes Film Festival and was praised for its cinematography. One critic likened Irola's work to Dorothea Lange's photography.

=== New York City ===
Irola left Cine Manifest after shooting Northern Lights and moved to New York City where she shared a loft in SoHo with Sandi Sissel and Joan Churchill. She was not allowed to join the NYC IATSE local, and the NABET local only represented commercial (advertising) cinematographers. She shot items and documentaries for 60 Minutes, 20/20, the BBC, Channel 4 and Canal+ using her commercial union card. This would become a problem in 1986.

She began collaborating with Tom Schiller, a writer on Saturday Night Live. They made eight short films for SNL together, including La Dolce Gilda, starring Gilda Radner, and Don’t Look Back in Anger, starring John Belushi. She also started shooting small independent features.

In 1986, she was cinematographer on Working Girls, directed by Lizzie Borden. The film opened to positive reviews of the cinematography and a good box office. IATSE noticed that Irola had worked on the film without a union card from them. They tried her, in her absence, and fined her $4,000. She fought them, and gained an amnesty but was still not permitted to join them.

=== Los Angeles ===
In 1989, following the Working Girls case, Irola moved to Los Angeles where she shot Lifestories for NBC television, and numerous films of the week for ABC and NBC.

In 1993, she shot the feature film Ambush of Ghosts with director Everett Lewis. She won the Award for Excellence in Cinematography at the 1993 Sundance Film Festival for the film. She was also appointed an associate professor at USC School of Cinematic Arts.

In 1995, Irola was successfully nominated for membership of the ASC by Woody Omens, Steven Poster and Robert Primes. She joined Sandi Sissel who had been admitted the year before, and was only the third woman to be accepted into the association. As a high profile female cinematographer, she was sought out for her views of the industry. She was interviewed in the book Women Behind the Camera - Conversations with Camerawomen by Alexis Krasilovsky (1997) and was also in the documentary Cinematographer Style (2005, directed by Jon Fauer).

Irola had become an associate professor at USC School of Cinematic Arts in 1992. By 1999, Irola was appointed head of the cinematography department, a position she held until her retirement in 2018. From 2005 she also held the Conrad Hall Chair in Cinematography and Color Timing, a position endowed by Steven Spielberg and George Lucas.

== Death ==
Irola died from complications of COVID-19 in Los Angeles on February 21, 2021, at the age of 77, during the COVID-19 pandemic in California.

== Awards ==
- Caméra d'Or at the 1979 Cannes Film Festival for Northern Lights
- Excellence in Cinematography at the Sundance Film Festival 1993 for An Ambush of Ghosts.
- Women in Film Kodak Vision Award 1997
- Women’s International Film & Television Showcase Foundation Cinematographer Award 2009
- Women’s International Film & Television Showcase Cinematographer Award 2012
- Nat Tiffen Award for Excellence in Cinematography Education 2014

== Film and television credits ==
As cinematographer:

- Song of the Canary (1978)
- Northern Lights (1978)
- Controlling Interest: The World of the Multinational Corporation (1978)
- Saturday Night Live: Schiller’s Reel. (1978) Eight films, including La Dolce Gilda and Don’t Look Back in Anger with John Belushi
- The Wobblies (1979)
- The Free Voice of Labor: The Jewish Anarchists (1979)
- The Willmar 8 (1980)
- Fundi: The Ella Baker Story (1981)
- Anarchism in America (1981)
- In the King of Prussia (1982)
- Vietnam: A Television History (1983)
- Working Girls (1986)
- The Uncompromising Revolution/Fidel at 60 (1988)
- Lifestories (1991) 9 part PBS tv series
- The Man Who Tried To Buy Hollywood: Giancarlo Parretti (1991) (First Prize Venice Film Festival) directed by Jean-Pierre Moscardo;
- The Glamorous Days of The Adlon Hotel (1995) (First Prize Bavarian Film Festival) directed by Percy Adlon

As a director:

- Cine Manifest (2006) - documentary
- Niger '66: A Peace Corps Diary (2010) - documentary
- The Sheepherder's Daughters (2014)
