= The Wobblies (film) =

1979 American film about Industrial Workers of the World labor union

- Directed by: Stewart Bird; Deborah Shaffer
- Produced by: Stewart Bird; Deborah Shaffer
- Narrated by: Roger Nash Baldwin
- Cinematography: Judy Irola; Sandi Sissel
- Edited by: Stewart Bird; Peter Gessner; Deborah Shaffer
- Distributed by: First Run Features
- Release date: 11 October 1979 (New York Film Festival)
- Running time: 89 minutes
- Country: United States
- Language: English

The Wobblies is a 1979 American documentary film directed by Stewart Bird and Deborah Shaffer. The documentary is done as an oral history about the Industrial Workers of the World, nicknamed "Wobblies".

== Production ==
The Wobblies was directed by Stewart Bird and Deborah Shaffer. Prior to making the film, Bird had co-wrote the play The Wobblies: The U.S. vs. Wm. D. Haywood, et al in the late 1970s, which was performed at the Hudson Guild Theatre in New York City. Several IWW organizers attended these performances. Shaffer, a friend of Bird, watched a performance one night and noticed old Wobblies in the audience. She went to Bird after the performance and suggested they should do a film about them. Due to the late ages potential Wobblies members would be, the directors put out ads asking for members. They would end up interviewing twenty-six Wobblies, with nineteen of them making it into the film.

Rip Torn and Geraldine Page did voiceover work for the documentary.

== Release ==
The Wobblies' worldwide rights were acquired by Kino Lorber in late 2021, releasing a 4K restoration on various video on demand platforms.

== Reception and legacy ==
Michael Blowen for The Boston Globe said the film conveyed the conviction and grace of the IWW with straightforward grace.

Deborah Shaffer and Stewart Bird co-founded the distribution company First Run Features.

In 2021, the film was selected for preservation in the United States National Film Registry by the Library of Congress as being "culturally, historically, or aesthetically significant".
