= STPP =

STPP may refer to:

- Sodium tripolyphosphate, a sodium salt of triphosphoric acid
- Singareni Thermal Power Project, located at Jaipur, Mancherial District, in Telangana, India
- Short-term psychodynamic psychotherapy, an intensive form of psychotherapy
- Subject to planning permission
- Saint Paul and Pacific Northwest Railroad
