= Schickele (disambiguation) =

Schickele is a surname. Notable people with the surname include:

- David Schickele (1937 – 1999), American musician, actor, and director
- Peter Schickele (1935 – 2024), American composer, musical educator, and parodist
- René Schickele (1883 – 1940), German-French writer, essayist, and translator
