= Working Girls (1986 film) =

1986 film by Lizzie Borden

- Original theatrical poster
- Directed by: Lizzie Borden
- Written by: Lizzie Borden; Sandra Kay
- Produced by: Lizzie Borden
- Starring: Louise Smith; Deborah Banks; Liz Caldwell; Ellen McElduff
- Cinematography: Judy Irola
- Production company: Alternate Current
- Distributed by: Miramax Films
- Release dates: May 28, 1986 (Cannes); February 5, 1987 (San Francisco)
- Running time: 91 minutes
- Country: United States
- Language: English
- Budget: $300,000
- Box office: $1.8 million

Working Girls is a 1986 American independent drama film, written (with Sandra Kay), produced and directed by Lizzie Borden working with cinematographer Judy Irola. Its plot follows a day in the life of several prostitutes in a Manhattan brothel.

== Plot ==
Molly, a Yale graduate in her late twenties living in New York City, works in a Manhattan brothel to support herself and her girlfriend Diane. Dawn, a college student, and Gina, an aspiring boutique owner, also work in the brothel, entertaining various male clients while Lucy, the brothel madam, is out shopping. In Lucy's absence, the three women covertly misrepresent their sessions in the books to keep more of the money. Jerry, a regular client and middle-aged construction foreman, engages in a threesome with Molly and Gina. Gina gives him a prostate massage before he engages in aggressive sex with her.

Another regular client named John nervously enters the brothel but makes an excuse and leaves in a rush before having sex with any of the women. Later Gina tells Molly that she recently broke up with her boyfriend; although he knew about her work and apparently did not mind, Gina wondered how he could love her given her occupation. Molly subsequently confesses to Gina that Diane does not know she is a prostitute. Fred, another client, visits Molly to engage in a sexual roleplay fantasy in which she pretends to be blind.

Lucy returns from her shopping trip and chastises the women for smoking weed inside the brothel and not keeping the common area tidy. She then proceeds to flaunt the expensive clothing she has purchased for a ski trip. Robert, a young financial advisor, and Joseph, an older attorney, both enter the brothel to meet with the women. Lucy engages in a discussion with Robert about what to do with her supply of gold.

Molly goes to have sex with Joseph and is preemptively informed by Lucy that Joseph likes "light" dominance, which she normally doesn't have her girls provide, but makes an exception for Joseph. Lucy's boyfriend Miles visits the brothel and is introduced to several of the girls along with a number of other clients. A new girl, Debbie, is hired, and is told by Lucy to not be upset should she make less than the other girls, as she is black and the brothel's clientele tends to prefer white women.

Molly is sent to run errands to pick up a number of items from a drug store for the girls in the brothel. After this, Lucy demands that Molly work overtime that night. Molly meets with Neil, a shy teacher and regular client who presents her with one of his shirts she had previously complimented him on casually. Despite their transactional sex, Molly and Neil appear to have a platonic friendship, as Molly tries to help coach him on how to treat the women he goes on dates with. During the night shift, Molly engages in a girl-on-girl "show" for a client with Mary, a new employee who's never had sexual contact with a woman and is uncomfortable with the profession. Lucy angrily returns to the brothel after finding that the phone lines were left on hold by another employee, April.

Paul, a musician client who wishes to see Molly outside of the brothel, visits for an appointment with her. During their encounter, Paul asks if she can meet him outside her sex work, and when Molly declines he belittles her and calls her a whore. The encounter upsets Molly, and she asks Lucy if she can leave, but Lucy informs her she has already made another appointment for Molly with another regular, Elliot, a wealthy fine-furniture dealer. Soon after, Lucy chastises Mary for talking to her child on the phone during a family emergency in front of a client. Molly and Elliot have sex, he offers to provide her with enough money to leave the brothel if she should meet him in public, she stalls him, but pockets the business card he's included with his payment. Exausted after her shift ends, Molly informs Lucy she is quitting the brothel. Lucy, who has fired Mary and is short-staffed, tries to keep Molly from leaving, to no avail. Molly deposits the money she had been saving, buys flowers for her girlfriend and rides home.

== Cast ==
- Louise Smith as Molly
- Ellen McElduff as Lucy
- Amanda Goodwin as Dawn
- Deborah Banks as Diane
- Liz Caldwell as Liz
- Marusia Zach as Gina
- Boomer Tibbs as Bob Berler
- Frederick Neumann as Fred "Fantasy Fred"
- Carla-Maria Sorey as Debbie
- Richard Davidson as Jerry
- Ronald Willoughby as John
- Paul Slimak as Jay
- Patience Pierce as Kathy
- Grant Wheaton as Robert
- Richard Leacock as Joseph
- Martin Haber as Don
- Michael Holland as Miles
- Dan Nutu as George, The Cook
- Ron Manning as Charles
- Janne Peters as April
- Norbert Brown as Neil
- Helen Nicholas as Mary
- Benjamin Egbuna as Bongo
- Chan Lee as "Joe"
- Ray Moy as "Bill"
- Lu Yu as "Spareribs"
- Roger Babb as Paul
- Saunder Finard as Elliot Kanter

== Production ==
The film was the second feature film directed by Lizzie Borden. Working Girls depicts the world of prostitution, and maintains some of the stylistic and thematic features of her debut, but is more mainstream in its approach. The film was inspired by some of the women who participated in the making of Born in Flames, who coincidentally supported themselves through prostitution. Although Working Girls addresses the subject of prostitution in great detail, Borden prefers the film to be discussed as a narrative fiction film rather than as a documentary. The film was intended to be a "backstage" look at prostitution.

== Release ==
Working Girls premiered in the Directors' Fortnight section of the 1986 Cannes Film Festival on May 28. Shortly after, Miramax Films executives Harvey Weinstein, Bob Weinstein, and Mark Lipsky met John Pierson to make an offer for distribution rights to the film, only for its producers to inform them of a prior commitment with Circle Films, which had offered $100,000. Bob, however, insisted on buying the film, continuously making calls to the filmmakers; Borden recounted, "Bob kept appearing with a suitcase full of a little bit more money every time we said no[...] I didn't trust them, but I liked them. I visited them in the apartment they were working out of." Ultimately, Miramax doubled Circle Films' offer and bid $200,000 for North American rights, at which point Borden gave in, "Fuck, these guys want it more than anyone else, why not give them a shot." The film was released theatrically in the United States by Miramax Films, opening in New York City on February 5, 1987. It was a commercial success, grossing $1,777,378 in the U.S. out of the estimated budget of $300,000.

== Reception ==
Roger Ebert gave the film three out of four stars, saying "... the movie does have ... the feeling of real life being observed accurately. I was moved less by the movie's conscious attempts at artistry than by its unadorned honesty". Sheila Benson of the Los Angeles Times called it "funny and insightful." Vincent Canby of the New York Times wrote a generally positive review, saying:

'Working Girls,' though a work of fiction, sounds as authentic as might a documentary about coal miners. The camera attends to the duties of the girls without apparent emotional response. Yet, as it watches them smile on their customers, build their egos and affect a totally bogus camaraderie with the men, it's ridiculing the poor slobs who must come to them with their fat wallets in search of pleasure and release.

On Rotten Tomatoes, the film holds a rating of 92% from 24 reviews. Metacritic, which uses a weighted average, assigned the film a score of 62 out of 100, based on 12 critics, indicating "generally favorable" reviews.

=== Accolades ===
It won the Special Jury Recognition at the 1987 Sundance Film Festival.

=== Home media ===
Anchor Bay Entertainment released the film on DVD in 2001. The film was released on DVD and Blu-ray by The Criterion Collection on July 13, 2021.
