= David Schickele =

American musician and film director

- Born: March 20, 1937; Ames, Iowa, U.S.
- Died: October 31, 1999 (aged 62) San Francisco, California, U.S.
- Occupations: Musician, film director, actor
- Instruments: Violin, viola

David Schickele (March 20, 1937 – October 31, 1999) was an American musician, film director, and actor.

== Early life ==
He was born in Ames, Iowa to Alsatian immigrant parents. His father, Rainer, was the son of writer René Schickele. His brother Peter Schickele was a musician and parodist. He grew up in Fargo, North Dakota and Washington, DC, and then studied English literature at Swarthmore College, graduating in 1958 (following Peter).

== Career ==
From 1958 to 1961, he played at Radio City Music Hall in New York City as a free-lance violist and recorded and toured the nation with the Robert Shaw Chorale. In 1961, he joined the Peace Corps and taught English language at University of Nigeria Nsukka through 1963. In an essay "When the Right Hand Washes the Left" published in the Swarthmore College Bulletin in 1963, he reflected on his Peace Corps experience:

"This to me is the meaning of the Peace Corps as a new frontier. It is the call to go, not where man has never been before, but where he has lived differently; the call to experience firsthand the intricacies of a different culture; to understand from the inside rather than the outside; and to test the limits of one’s own way of life against another in the same manner as the original pioneer tested the limits of his endurance against the elements."

When he returned to the U.S., he made the first major film about the Peace Corps related to his experiences in Nigeria titled Give Me a Riddle (1966). In 1971, he directed his second film, Bushman, which was restored and released in 2024. The film won numerous awards, including Best First Feature at the Chicago International Film Festival. It was also accepted by the Pacific Film Archive at UC-Berkeley and the Museum of Modern Art in New York for their archives. In 1992, his last film, Tuscarora, was released.

In 1978, he contributed some music to Northern Lights, a film by Rob Nilsson whom he met during his time in Nigeria. He later starred in two of his films, Signal Seven and Heat and Sunlight. He also starred in seven movies directed by Bobby Roth – Dead Solid Perfect (1988), Keeper of the City (1991), The Switch (1992), Judgment Day: The John List Story (1993), Ride with the Wind (1993), Kidnapped: In the Line of Duty (1995), and Naomi & Wynonna: Love Can Build a Bridge (1995). In 1979, he received the Guggenheim Fellowship.

He died in San Francisco at the age of 62.
