= Donna Allegra =

American writer

- Born: Donna Allegra Simms; December 8, 1953; Brooklyn, New York, U.S.
- Died: January 13, 2020 (aged 66); Brooklyn, New York, U.S.
- Occupations: Writer, dancer, electrician

Donna Allegra Simms (December 8, 1953 – January 13, 2020) was an American author, artist, poet, dancer, actor, and electrician. Her poems and stories have been published in over 30 publications as well as her respective debut novel, Witness to the League of Blond Hip Hop Dancers. She was an activist and an out and proud black lesbian. Throughout the expansive list of works documented by Allegra, the artist spent her life writing stories from her experiences and placing a spotlight on increasing diversity in feminist literature and lesbian literature. Her significant publication of her debut novel was the focus on black lesbian dancers and the discrimination faced by these minorities. Some of her inspirations come from the other creatives she collaborated with, in addition to her childhood growing up reading lesbian pulp fiction novels. Her works were frequently anthologized in women-oriented publications.

== Early life and education ==
Allegra was born in Brooklyn, New York in 1953. Born the oldest of two children, Allegra and her brother resided with their father following the separation of her parents when she was 9. Allegra had a tumultuous relationship with both parents, with both being unaccepting of her sexuality. Allegra was estranged from both her parents for a large portion of her life, her mother after the separation yet attempted a relationship before her mother's death and she was estranged from her father after high school. She graduated from Tilden High School in 1970. She attended Bennington College and Hunter College, and graduated from New York University in 1977. Her undergraduate studies focused on dramatic literature, theatre history, and film studies. "I needed them the way I needed food and shelter for survival," she wrote about the lesbian pulp novels she read as a girl. She recalled her parents as dismissive of her sexual identity as a "phase".

== Career ==
Allegra worked as an electrician and was active in the tradeswomen movement and in IBEW Local 3. Operating as an electrician in the construction industry, Allegra used her day job as an ability to support her art. Allegra attributes a large amount of influence on her writing as well as her identity as a lesbian from her experience reading lesbian pulp novels. These types of books which can discuss more controversial topics such as the lesbian identity in literature was a foundation for Allegra in putting words to her emotions and identity. Her footprint within the creative world was vast and various, with not only her written publications but also her. She produced radio programs The Lesbian Show and The Velvet Sledgehammer for WBAI in the late 1970s. She was a member of the Jemima Writers Collective, along with Chirlane McCray and Sapphire. She wrote stories, poems, essays, and book reviews, and was a skilled dancer. Her writings were frequently anthologized, usually alongside other Black women writers, or other lesbian writers, or other Black LGBT writers. She won the Pat Parker Memorial Poetry Prize in 1992, and was a finalist for the Violet Quill Award in 2000.

As Donna Allegra Simms, she appeared briefly in two films, Cool Hands, Warm Heart (1979, short), and Born in Flames (1983, directed by Lizzie Borden).

== Publications ==
- "Butch on the Streets" (1992)
- "Carrot Juice" and "Top of the Morning" (1993, stories)
- "Fat Dancer" (1994, essay)
- "Buddies" (1994)
- "Comparing class notes" (1994, essay)
- "Between the Sheets: My Sex Life in Literature" (1995, essay)
- "She Tickles with a Hammer" (1996, essay)
- "Inconspicuous Assumptions" (1997, essay)
- "Lavender Sheep in the Fold" (1997)
- "Stilled Life" (poem)
- "Strapped" (1997, story)
- "Dance of the Cranes" (1997, story)
- "Rhomboid Pegs for Oblong Hearts" (1999, essay)
- "Smoke Detectors" (2000, poem)
- "Navigating by Stars" (2000, story)
- Witness to the League of Blonde Hip Hop Dancers (2000, short stories)
- "The Dead Mothers Club" (2003, story)
- "God Lies in the Details" (2004, story)

== Major works and publications ==
Allegra's works and poems have been published in a plethora of feminist and lesbian anthologies, magazines, and journals. Her poems have been published within Tradeswomen Magazine, Heresies Project, Sinister Wisdom, and Home Girls: A Black Feminist Anthropology written by Barbara Smith alongside several others. In 2001 in the later years of Allegra's literary career, the author published her debut novel Witness to the League of Blond Hip Hop Dancers. This debut novel was a collection of 12 short stories in addition to a novella of the title name, documenting the interracial relationships and racism faced by her African American characters in the dance realm. From her own experience as a black female dancer, Allegra chose her first novel to be a representation of the issues faced by black sapphic women especially during a time of internal reflection on the actions of the feminist movement. Through her words in the title novella which follows 4 characters, a white straight woman, a white gay man, and two black butch lesbians, as they try out for one spot on a dance team, she documents the micro-aggressions of racism through dialogue and actions of oppression that her characters find themselves against. The collection of stories contains themes of homophobia, sexism, and racism in varying examples and situations.

== Social activism ==
Coming from an unaccepting family of her identity and sexuality, in addition to the rise of social activism for racial and gender equality during Allegra's lifetime, Allegra focused her life on writing to represent the community in which she helped create. With her partnerships with feminist collectives which built foundations of support for feminists living in New York City and her words documenting her experiences and struggles. Alongside her main collaboration being a member of the Jemima Writer's Collective, there is also her participation in the collective's predecessor, the Salsa Soul Sisters, and following the Jemima Writer's Collective was the black lesbian group called Naps and the Gap-Toothed Girlfriends Writers Workshop in which Allegra was a late member of. Allegra had placed deep roots in the community of black writers, feminists, and lesbians of New York City. The decision of her characters, focusing on women of color and lesbians, Allegra shifted the priority of perspective from white characters or men to her non-straight, non-white female characters. In addition to her intention in her writing, Allegra also held experience working as a blue-collared women in construction which has historically been a male dominated industry. In her publication in Tradeswomen Magazine, a magazine created as a platform for blue-collared women, Allegra participated in advocating on improving the atmosphere women in construction were placed in and the obstacles they faced. Her story, Smoke showcased the nuances of being a woman in construction and the different way women are viewed in this male dominated field.

== Personal life ==
Allegra died in 2020, at the age of 66, at her home in Brooklyn. Her papers are in the Schomburg Center for Research in Black Culture, New York Public Library.
