= Stephen Yoakam =

American actor

Stephen Yoakam is an actor who has appeared in several motion pictures and television movies. He also guest starred in the Star Trek: Deep Space Nine episodes "When It Rains..." and "The Dogs of War" as the Romulan Subcommander/General Velal.

Yoakam often narrates productions of Peer Gynt with the Minnesota Orchestra. He has been a member of the acting company of the Guthrie Theatre for over 20 years.

== Partial filmography ==
| Year | Title | Role | Notes |
|---|---|---|---|
| 1984 | Wildrose | Billy | |
| 1988 | Shattered Innocence | | |
| 1988 | Overnight Delivery | SWAT Leader | |
| 2000 | Here on Earth | | |
| 2005 | Sweet Land | | |
| 2008 | Older Than America | Father Bartoli | |
