= Heat and Sunlight =

- Directed by: Rob Nilsson
- Written by: Rob Nilsson
- Starring: Rob Nilsson; Consuela Faust
- Music by: Michael Small
- Distributed by: Silverlight Pictures
- Release dates: September 17, 1987 (TIFF); November 1, 1988 (United States)
- Running time: 98 minutes
- Country: United States
- Language: English

Heat and Sunlight is a 1987 independent film written, directed by and starring Rob Nilsson.

== Summary ==
It tells the story of a photojournalist (Nilsson), who had worked in Biafra, trying to patch up his relationship with his lover Carmen (Consuelo Faust) despite his jealousy and violent impulses.

== Cast ==
- Rob Nilsson as Mel Hurley
- Consuela Faust as Carmen
- Don Bajema as Mitch
- Ernie Fosselius as Bobby
- Bill Bailey as Barney
- Russell Murphy as Adam
- Cody Bear as Cody
- Bill Ackridge as a dealer
- Lester Cohen as a dealer
- Bob Elrons as a dealer
- Burns Ellison as a dealer
- Dan Leegant as a dealer
- Herb Mills as a dealer
- Richard A. Rohieder as a dealer
- Raven De La Croix as herself
- Johnny Tidwell as Raven's bodyguard
- Charles Webb as MC
- David Schickele as birthday spirit
- Randolph Crook as shuffler
- Rahni Raines as singer
- Anisa Gamal as singer
- Daniel F. Hohmann as barman
- Suzanne McCabe as waitress
- Elvin Case as custumer

== Soundtrack ==
The music from the David Byrne/Brian Eno album My Life in the Bush of Ghosts was used for the black and white video shot film.

== Accolades ==
The film won the Grand Jury Prize at the 1988 Sundance Film Festival.

Awards
Preceded by Waiting for the Moon	Sundance Grand Jury Prize: U.S. Dramatic; 1988	Succeeded by True Love
