= Jaipur mandal =

Jaipur
- Mandal
- Location in Telangana, India Jaipur (India)
- Coordinates: 18.8490001°N 79.5755196°E
- Country: India
- State: Telangana
- District: Mancherial

Languages
  - Official: Telugu
- Time zone: UTC+5:30 (IST)
- PIN: 504216
- Nearest city: Mancherial

Jaipur is a Mandal located in Mancherial District in Telangana state in India. The Singareni Thermal Power Plant (2X600MW) was established in Jaipur Mandal at Pedapalle village.

== Administrative divisions ==
There are 23 villages in Jaipur mandal.

Sl. No	Villages in the mandal
1	Kankur
2	Mittapalle
3	Jaipur
4	Narva
5	Maddikunta
6	Ramaraopet
7	Indaram
8	Tekumatla
9	Shetpalle
10	Yelkanti
11	Pegadapalle
12	Gangipalle
13	Narasingapuram
14	Bejjal
15	Maddulapalle
16	Kundaram
17	Kachanpelly
18	Rommipur
19	Kistapur
20	Velal
21	Gopalpur
22	Pownur
23	Shivvaram
