= Singareni Collieries Company =

Telangana government-owned coal-mining corporation

The Singareni Collieries Company Limited
- Type: Public
- Industry: Coal mining
- Founded: 23 December 1920 (105 years ago)
- Headquarters: Kothagudem, Telangana, India
- Key people: Mallu Bhatti Vikramarka (Minister of Energy, Government of Telangana); N. Balram, IRS (Chairman and Managing Director)
- Products: Coal Mining; Power
- Owner: Government of Telangana (51%); Government of India (49%)
- Number of employees: 40,225 (2026)
- Parent: Ministry of Energy, Government of Telangana
- Website: SCCL official website

The Singareni Collieries Company Limited (SCCL) is a state-owned coal mining enterprise in India. It is jointly owned by the Government of Telangana, which holds a 51% stake in the company, and the Indian Ministry of Coal. Singareni Collieries owns and operates 17 open-cast mines and 22 underground mines in the state of Telangana. In September 2025, the company reported a total of 41,000 regular employees, with an additional 30,000 workers employed on a contract basis.

Since 2015, Singareni Collieries has extracted a total of 692 million tonnes of coal, including 58 million tonnes in the 2025-26 fiscal year. The company is responsible for 9.2% of India's total domestic coal production. In 2025, Singareni Collieries launched two subsidiaries, Singareni Green Energy Company and Singareni Global Limited, focused on solar power and overseas mining operations respectively. The company also opened a new mine in the Angul district of Odisha, its first mining operation outside the state of Telangana.

== History ==
In 1871, William King, a geologist of the Geological Survey of India, discovered coal near the town of Yellandu in Hyderabad State while conducting a geological survey. The Hyderabad (Deccan) Company Limited, incorporated in England, acquired the area's coal mining rights in 1886. The company, renamed Singareni Collieries Company in 1920, was later purchased by Hyderabad State in 1945. Following Indian independence, a majority of the shares were owned by the Andhra Pradesh state government.

== Administrators ==
Sl. No.	Years	Name	Designation	Highest Degree
1	1921 - 1934	Sir Gordon Fraser, OBE	Chairperson (CP)	
2	1934 - 1942	Mr. L. C. Croslegh	CP	
3	1942 - 1945	Sir Robert Denniston, OBE	CP	
4	1946	Mr. Zahid Husain, C. I. E.	CP	
5	1947	Nawab Liakat Jung Bahadur	CP	
6	1948	Nawab Moin Nawaz Jung Bahadur	CP	
7	1948 - 1949	Mr. D. R. Pradhan, I. C. S.	CP	
8	1949 - 1952	Mr. C. V. S. Rao, C. I. E.	CP	
9	1952 - 1956	Dr. G. S. Melkote	CP	M.B.B.S.
10	1956 - 1957	Mr. K. Venkata Rao	CP	PUC
11	1957 - 1958	Mr. S. J. Tarapore	CP	
12	1959	Mr. P. M. Nayak, I.C.S.	CP	
13	1959	Mr. R. Prasad, I.C.S.	CP	
14	1960	Mr. R. S. Krishnaswamy, I.C.S.	CP	M. A.
15	1961	Mr. P. M. Nayak, I.C.S.	CP	
16	1962 - 1964	Mr. M. P. Pai, I.C.S.	CP	
17	1964 - 1972	Mr. V. K. Rao, I.C.S.	CP	
18	1972 - 1974	Mr. K. I. Vidyasagar, I. A. S.	Chairperson & Managing Director (CMD)	
19	1974 - 1978	Mr. B. N. Raman, I. A. S.	CMD	
20	1979 - 1981	Mr. C. N. Sastry, I. A. S.	CMD	
21	1981 - 1982	Mr. S. Santhanam, I. A. S.	CMD	
22	1982	Mr. P. K. Doraiswamy, I. A. S.	CMD	
23	1982 - 1983	Mr. A. Valliappan, I. A. S.	CMD	
24	1983 - 1984	Mr. K. M. Ahmad, I. A. S.	CMD	
25	1984 - 1987	Mr. G. P. Rao, I. A. S.	CMD	
26	1987 - 1990	Mr. V. Govindarajan, I. A. S.	CMD	
27	1990 - 1992	Mr. A. Valliappan, I. A. S.	CMD	
28	1992	Mr. R. V. Krishnan, I. A. S.	CMD	
29	1992 - 1996	Mr. P. P. Williams, I. A. S.	CMD	MSc (Andhra)
30	1996	Mr. M. C. Mahapatra, I. A. S.	CMD	
31	1996	Mr. P. V. Bhide, I. A. S.	CMD	M. B. A.
32	1997 - 2001	Mr. A. P. V. N. Sarma, I. A. S.	CMD	B. E. (REC)
33	2001 - 2006	Mr. R. H. Khwaja, I. A. S.	CMD	M.A. (Aligarh)
34	2006 - 2012	Mr. S. Narsing Rao, I. A. S.	CMD	MSc (Osmania)
35	2012 - 2014	Mr. Sutirtha Bhattacharya, I. A. S.	CMD	BSc (Calcutta)
36	2015 - 2023	Mr. N. Sridhar, I. A. S.	CMD	B. E.
37	Since 2023	Mr. N. Balram, I.R.S	CMD	

== See also ==
- Singareni Thermal Power Plant
- List of trade unions in the Singareni coal fields
