= Andhra Pradesh State Handloom Weavers Cooperative Society =

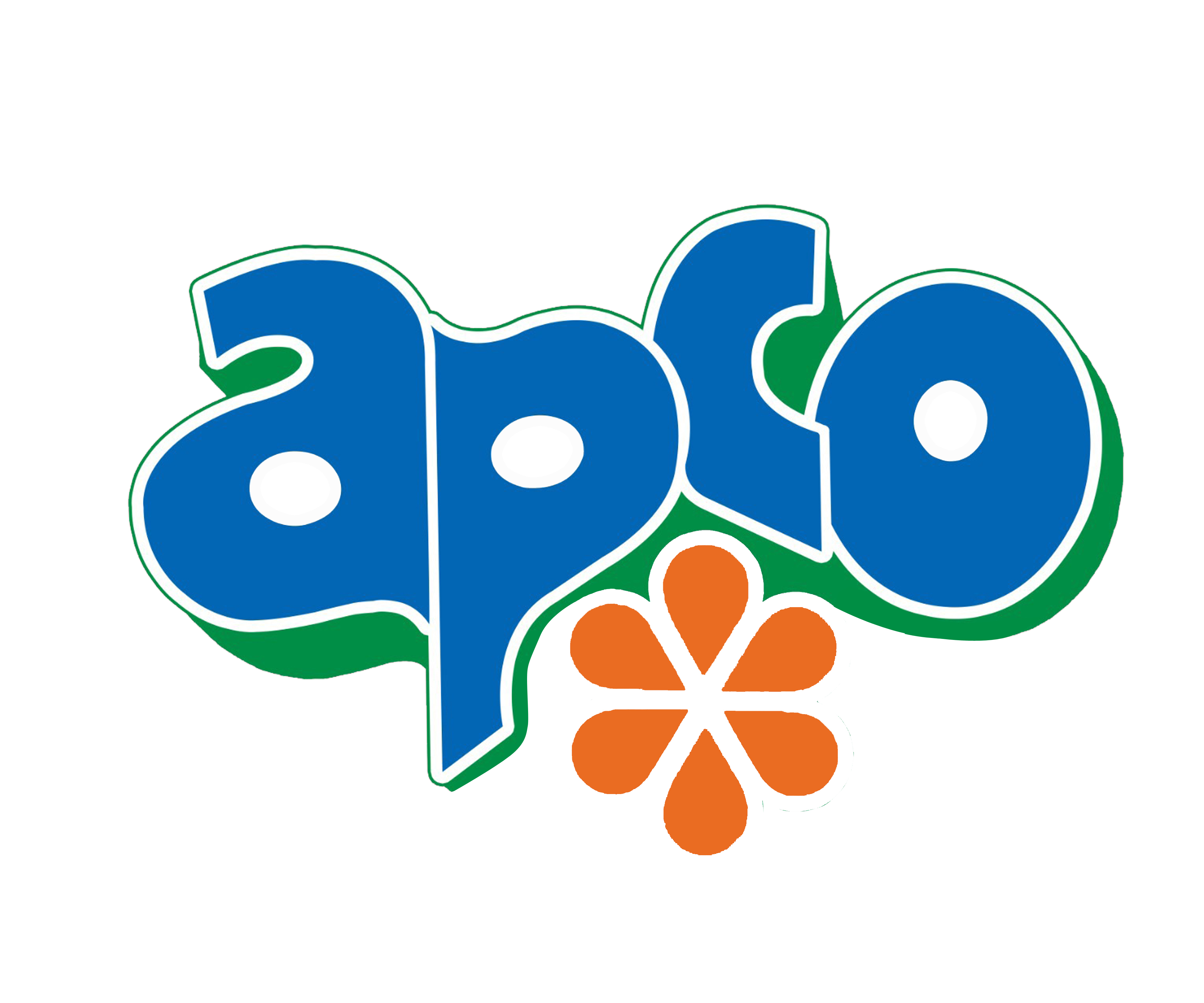
- Capturing a timeless tradition in fascinating fabrics since 1976
- Trade name: APCO
- Native name: ఆప్కో
- Company type: cloth industry
- Traded as: textile industry
- Industry: Hand looms
- Founded: 1976; 50 years ago
- Headquarters: Telangana & Andhra Pradesh, India
- Products: Silk and Cotton Fabrics
- Owners: Government undertaking
- Number of employees: 466
- Website: apcohandlooms.com

The Andhra Pradesh State Handloom Weavers Cooperative Society (Telugu : ఆంధ్రప్రదేశ్ రాష్ట్ర చేనేత పారిశ్రామికుల సహకారక సంఘం) popularly known as APCO (ఆప్కో), is a cooperative of traditional handloom weavers from the Indian state of Andhra Pradesh. Operating as a two-tiered system with village and state level handloom weavers cooperatives, APCO seeks to preserve the artistic heritage of handloom artisanship by increasing the economic viability of producing traditional silk and cotton weaves. The organisation owns a number of shopping outlets in Andhra Pradesh. The society was registered in the year 1976 with registered No. T.P.W. 44 under the Andhra Pradesh Cooperative Societies Act.

== See also ==
- Khadi
- Khādī Development and Village Industries Commission (Khadi Gramodyog)
- Co-optex
- Government of Andhra Pradesh
