= Charles Webb =

Charles or Charlie Webb may refer to:

- The Somerton Man, who has supposedly been identified as a man going by this name
- Charles Webb (author) (1939–2020), American author
- Charles Webb (architect) (1821–1898), architect working in Victoria, Australia
- Charles Webb (Barbadian cricketer) (1830-1917), Barbadian cricketer
- Charles Webb (English cricketer) (1874–1963), Middlesex cricketer
- Charles Webb (footballer) (1879–1939), English footballer with several clubs, including Leicester Fosse, Manchester City and Southampton
- Charlie Webb (1886–1973), Ireland international footballer who played for and managed Brighton & Hove Albion
- Chuck Webb (Charles Eugene Webb, born 1969), professional American football player
- Charles Henry Webb (1834–1905), American poet, author and journalist
- Charles Harper Webb, American poet
- Charles M. Webb (1833–1911), American politician from Wisconsin
- Charles Webb (1923–1997), American professional baseball player; see 1949 Detroit Tigers season
- Harry Webb (politician) (Charles Harry Webb, 1908–2000), Australian politician
- Charles Herbert Webb, journalist with The China Press
- Charles Webb (rugby league), New Zealand rugby league player
- Charles Webb (rugby union), English international rugby union player
- Charles V. Webb Jr. (1910–2010), American politician and lawyer from New Jersey
- Charles Webb (chef), American chef and businessman
