= Praying with Lior =

- Directed by: Ilana Trachtman
- Produced by: Ilana Trachtman
- Starring: Lior Liebling
- Cinematography: Slawomir Grunberg; Ari Haberberg
- Edited by: Zelda Greenstein
- Music by: Andy Statman
- Distributed by: First Run Features
- Release date: 1 February 2008
- Running time: 87 minutes
- Country: United States
- Language: English
- Box office: $82,553 (US domestic)

Praying with Lior is a 2008 documentary about a Jewish boy, Lior, who has Down syndrome. The film follows Lior and his family as they prepare for Lior's bar mitzvah. Lior is the son of Rabbi Mordechai Liebling and Rabbi Devorah Bartnoff. Devorah died when Lior was six, and her memory infuses Lior's spirituality and his preparation for his bar mitzvah.

Praying with Lior received six Audience Awards for Best Documentary, was broadcast on PBS and several international channels, and has inspired many faith communities to adopt inclusion committees.
