= Love Crimes (film) =

1992 American thriller film

- Directed by: Lizzie Borden
- Screenplay by: Allan Moyle; Laurie Frank
- Story by: Allan Moyle
- Produced by: Lizzie Borden; Rudy Langlais
- Starring: Sean Young; Patrick Bergin; Arnetia Walker; James Read
- Cinematography: Jack N. Green
- Edited by: Nicholas C. Smith; Mike Jackson
- Music by: Graeme Revell
- Distributed by: Miramax Films
- Release date: January 24, 1992
- Running time: 84 minutes (theatrical); 91 minutes (unrated director's cut)
- Country: United States
- Language: English
- Budget: $6 million
- Box office: $2,287,928

Love Crimes is a 1992 American erotic thriller directed by Lizzie Borden starring Sean Young and Patrick Bergin about Dana Greenway, an assistant district attorney who tries to seduce and apprehend psychopath David Hanover. The screenplay is by Allan Moyle and Laurie Frank, based on a story by Moyle.

== Plot ==
Assistant district attorney Dana Greenway conspires with police lieutenant Maria Johnson to go after a serial sexual predator who identifies himself to his victims as David Hanover, a distinguished photographer.

Greenway goes undercover, changing her appearance and passing herself off as a repressed schoolteacher. She eventually encounters Hanover, who seduces her, photographs her nude and causes Lt. Johnson to believe that Greenway might actually have fallen under his spell.

Flashbacks to Greenway's troubled childhood, including abuse from her father Lou-Jay, who locked her in a closet, haunt her as she attempts to come to her senses and get the better of Hanover, who clearly intends to humiliate and then kill her.

== Cast ==
- Sean Young as Dana Greenway
  - Danielle Shuman as Young Dana Greenway
- Patrick Bergin as David Hanover
- Arnetia Walker as Lt. Maria Johnson
- James Read as Stanton Gray
- Fern Dorsey as Colleen Dells
- Donna Biscoe as Hannah
- David Shuman as Lou-Jay Greenway
- Gary Bullock as Joey
- Sonny Shroyer as Cop
- Wayne Shorter as Saxophonist
- Ronnie Free as Drummer
- Jo Jones as Pianist
- Ben Tucker as Bassist

== Reception ==
Love Crimes received negative reviews from critics and flopped at the box office. On the review aggregator website Rotten Tomatoes, 0% of 6 critics' reviews are positive.

Sean Young earned a nomination for the Golden Raspberry Award for Worst Actress for her performance in the film, where she lost to Melanie Griffith for both Shining Through and A Stranger Among Us at the 13th Golden Raspberry Awards. The film is listed in Golden Raspberry Award founder John Wilson's book The Official Razzie Movie Guide as one of the "100 Most Enjoyably Bad Movies Ever Made".

Lizzie Borden said in an online interview with The Important Cinema Club that Harvey Weinstein wanted the ending changed before the film began production, so there was "no script" going in, throwing production into chaos. The film was taken out of her hands during post-production and filmmaker Kit Carson shot flashbacks against Borden's will. Borden wanted to take her name off the film but Weinstein threatened to "destroy her career" if she did. She also said there was never a "director's cut." This was just a marketing ploy by Weinstein to release a version with more erotic footage in the hopes of drawing more box office.
