= Singareni Thermal Power Plant =

Power plant in India

Coordinates: 18.837231°N 79.574766°E

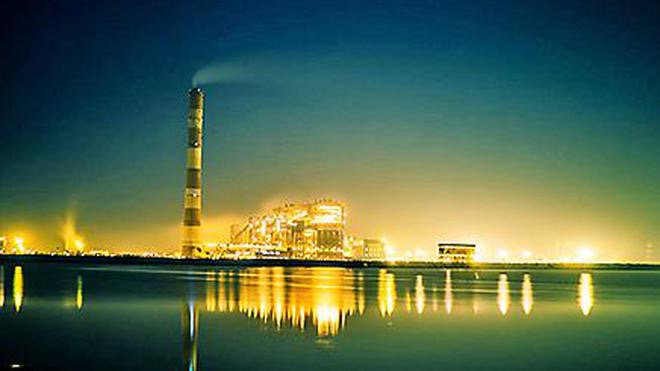
- Country: India
- Location: Jaipur, Mancherial, Telangana
- Status: Operational
- Construction began: 11 Nov 2011
- Commission date: Unit-1: 25 Sep 2016 Unit-2: 2 Dec 2016
- Construction cost: Rs 8250 Crores
- Owner: SCCL
- Operators: Power Mech Projects Ltd. (Hyderabad, India) w.e.f 01.05.2021

Thermal power station
- Primary fuel: Coal

Power generation
- Units operational: 2× 600 MW
- Make and model: BHEL
- Nameplate capacity: 1200 MW

External links
- Website: scclmines.com

The Singareni Thermal Power Plant (STPP) is a coal-fired power station in Pegadapalli, a village in Jaipur mandal in Mancherial district of Telangana, India. The power plant has an installed capacity of 1200 MW, consisting of two 600 MW units, and is operated by the Singareni Collieries Company.

== History ==
=== Coal mining ===
Singareni Collieries Company (SCCL), a government-owned coal mining company, was established in 1920 under the Hyderabad Companies Act. The company is jointly owned by the Telangana government (51%) and the Union Government (49%). It was named after the village of Singareni in the Bhadradri Kothagudem district of Telangana State.

In the year 1871, the state's first coal reserves were discovered in Singareni village near Yellandu by Dr. William King of the geological Survey of India during the British era. In 1889 Hyderabad Deccan company Limited incorporated in England and stocks were traded in London Stock Exchange and coal mining started. On 23 December 1920 coal mining operations transferred to the new company and renamed as Singareni Collieries Company Limited and the day is celebrated as Singareni day in the company every year. In 1945 Nizam of Hyderabad took over, thus singareni became first government managed company. In 1960 Government of India participated with 49% equity.

SCCL now operates 18 open-pit mines and 29 underground mines across 6 Telangana districts: Bhadradri Kothagudem, Khammam, Jayashankar Bhupalpally, Ramagundam, Mancheriyal and Komaram_Bheem_Asifabad_district. The Company produced 61.34 Million Tonnes (MT) of the coal in the year 2016-17 and 62.01 MT in the year 2017–18. SCCL purchases about 60 MU (Million units) power from the state distribution companies.

N. Sridhar, Singareni Collieries Chairman and managing director expects STPP to bring down the deficit in power generation in Telangana State. Under his leadership Sanjay Kumar Sur, executive director (Power Projects) is currently leading the power plant operations and future expansion.

=== Thermal power plant ===
While SCCL had an extensive background in coal mining, the company decided to enter the power industry as part of the new Bangaru Telangana initiative. This decision made SCCL the first Indian coal PSU to make a large-scale entrance into the power generation industry. SCCL began the Singareni power plant project, to consist of two 600 MW units, on 11 November 2011 at Jaipur mandal, Mancherial District.

NTPC Limited was contracted to handle erection and commissioning for the project. Contracts for the Boiler Turbine Generator (BTG) and the Balance of Plant (BOP) were granted to Bharat Heavy Electricals Limited and McNally Bharat Engineering Company Limited, Kolkata, respectively.

Power plant synchronisation was completed on 13 March 2016 for Unit 1 and on 1 September 2016 for Unit 2. Stage I of the power plant project was completed with Unit 1 being commissioned on 25 September 2016 and Unit 2 on 2 December 2016. The power plant was dedicated to nation by Prime Minister Narendra Modi on 7 August 2016.

PV Solar Plant

STPP Established 10 MW Solar PV cell power plant and it is now in operartion, STPP is also planning to establish Floating Solar Power Plant of 15 MW capacity on its Reservoir.

== Future Expansion ==
SCCL is planning on expanding the power plant with a third 800 MW unit as part of a Stage II. SCCL has separate 127.31 hectares of land adjacent to the same existing plant for 800 MW and estimated cost of the project is Rs.5879.62 Crore. MoEF has given clearance for the project on 18 December 2019.
