= Valerie Smaldone =

American actress

- Born: May 24, 1958 (age 68); Bronx, New York, U.S.
- Occupations: Radio personality; Actress; Producer; Businesswoman
- Years active: 1979–present
- Spouse: William Dentato (m. 1983; div. 2000)
- Partner: Richard Steinhaus, Jr. (2001–present)
- Website: valeriesmaldone.com

Valerie Smaldone is an American radio host, voice artist, actress, director, producer, and media personality. A five-time Billboard Magazine Award- winner, she is known for hosting the #1 on-air position in the New York radio market as the midday host of WLTW. Smaldone has been a PBS host and interviewer for WNET, WLIW, NJTV, and other public television stations, and a featured reporter on ABC for the Columbus Day Parade. She was the host, producer and founder of the Broadway and food-themed talk radio program and podcast “Bagels and Broadway with Valerie Smaldone.”

Currently, she is an executive producer on Divine Renovation, a home improvement reality series with a spiritual twist, hosted by television icon Erik Estrada. Her partners in this venture are Monty Hobbs and Matthieu Chazareix.

In 2022, she directed and was executive producer of the faith-based film The Thursday Night Club adapted from the novella and audio drama podcast written by Steven Manchester.

An accomplished voice-over artist, Valerie was the narrator on the episodic program “Fatal Encounters” on Investigation Discovery Channel. She has recorded commercials for clients like Verizon, Victoria's Secret and Vanguard as well as television promos for The CBS Morning Show, Dateline on NBC, The NBC Nightly News, The Today Show, Lifetime, Cinemax and many others. Valerie was the announcer for The Boomer Esiason Show on MSG for 4 seasons. A career spanning over four decades, Smaldone has a successful career in radio, television, theatre, and film.

== Early life ==
Smaldone was born in the Bronx in New York City. Born to parents Frances Carcaterra Smaldone and Anthony Smaldone. She attended the Bronx High School of Science but described herself as “completely obsessed” with theatre at an early age.

In the mid-70s, she attended Fordham University in the Bronx studying Communications and English.

Despite living in the Bronx, Smaldone found herself unaffected by the borough's dire situation, “I didn’t really know any better. It was what it was. I lived on campus for two of my four years, so that felt quite safe.”

Within her first days on campus, she stopped by Fordham's radio station, WFUV. Smaldone enjoyed her time working at WFUV, which was not yet a public radio station but an exclusively student-run organization. One of her favorite memories at WFUV, where she hosted her own Broadway show tunes program called “Showstoppers,” was the opportunity to interview composer Charles Strouse. Strouse made a drawing for Smaldone that she still keeps.

== Career ==
=== Radio ===
During her Fordham years, Smaldone interned for Universal Pictures at its New York public relations office. She was then offered two jobs: one working in PR at a summertime music festival sponsored by PepsiCo and another at Hartsdale-based radio station WFAS, owned by Frank A. Seitz. She sent a demo tape of her work at WFUV to WFAS, and, at first, was not hired. However, a second demo reel landed Smaldone her first radio job during her junior year at Fordham.

After graduation in 1979, Smaldone began working at WWYD, an FM station owned by the same company as WFAS. By 1981, Smaldone was recruited by WVIP in Mt. Kisco, New York. Owned by producer Martin Stone, Stone hired Smaldone to host an afternoon show as well as a morning program on Sundays. Smaldone then began hosting and producing a cable television program called, “Meet the VIPs.” This program granted her more interviewing experience with guests like television icon Regis Philbin and Mrs. Jackie Robinson.

After meeting her, Bob Bruno, the program director of WOR, suggested she send a demo tape to George Wolfson, General Manager of the soon-to-be new adult contemporary radio station, WLTW (Lite-FM).

She was quickly snapped up and hosted her first on-air shift at the newly formed radio station, WLTW, 1067. LITE-FM, on Feb. 4, 1984. She went on to be the evening host for 5 years. By 1989, the station created a noon to 4 p.m. midday slot and gave Smaldone mid-day hosting responsibilities, which she did for 19 years. “We were the Yankees of radio,” she claimed.

In addition to radio, Smaldone recorded daily local news promos on CBS-TV, and was paid $700 a day for hosting the television shopping show “Shopper’s University.” She was also offered a weekend job as a QVC host in West Chester, PA, but she took the Shopper's University offer instead. Smaldone hosted and produced “two or three syndicated shows” for which she conducted a variety of interviews with celebrities like Paul McCartney, Elton John, Billy Joel, Lionel Richie, Cher, the Bee Gees, and Mariah Carey.

Among the many interviews she has conducted, her interview with Rod Stewart led to a friendship, as Mr. Stewart took notice of Smaldone's talent. Shortly after their second successful interview, Mr. Stewart personally requested Smaldone to interview him for his 2003 concert special, “It Had to Be You: The Great American Songbook.”

After 24 years at WLTW and many notable ventures, including co-presenting the 2000 Billboard Music Awards with Ryan Seacrest, and the 1996 Atlanta Summer Olympic Torch event in Rockefeller Center with Bob Costas, Smaldone felt it was time for a change. Smaldone founded Valerie Smaldone Media Worldwide, LLC a talent coaching, production company, and consultation agency. In 2009, Smaldone became an adjunct instructor at The School of Visual Arts, where she teaches adults voice-over acting and hosting and interviewing skills.

She has been the “Voice of God” for numerous prestigious live events including The Kennedy Center, The Clinton Global Initiative, The Concordia Summit, The Drama Desk Awards, Product of the Year Awards, The Tony Preview Concert on CBS, The Drama Desk Awards, Broadway on Broadway in Times Square, Broadway Under the Stars in Central Park, The New York Emmy Awards, The GLAAD Media Awards, The Point Foundation, and many more.

In July 2019, Smaldone launched “Bagels and Broadway with Valerie Smaldone,” a talk radio program on AM970 in New York and on podcast, which combines discussions with Broadway performers and behind-the-scene creatives and producers, with stories about New York City eateries and innovative food products. Airing weekly on Saturday mornings from 9 to 10, the program has thus far featured interviews with Brenda Vaccaro, Laura Benanti, Susan Lucci, Stephen Schwartz, Dionne Warwick, and Michael Lomonaco and many others.

== Acting career ==
=== Television ===
As an actress, Valerie had a featured role on Law and Order: Organized Crime, The Other Two, Tommy, “Manifest” and Blue Bloods, and was a recurring character on the Fox Television series, “The Following.” On stage, she starred in comedies “The Guido Monologues,” and “What Are Ya Nuts?” On television, Valerie is a host and interviewer for PBS. She has been a special reporter for ABC and NBC for the Columbus Day Parade.

A well-known voice-over artist, Smaldone narrated the program “Fatal Encounters” on Investigation Discovery Channel. She has recorded commercials for clients like Tidy Cats Kitty Litter, IBM, Verizon, Publix Supermarkets, and Minute Maid as well as television promos for Dateline on NBC, The NBC Nightly News, The Today Show, The CBS Morning Show, Lifetime, Cinemax, Oxygen, and others. Valerie was the announcer for The Boomer Esiason Show on MSG for 4 seasons. She was the imaging voice on CHUP, Calgary, Canada and The Cat in Santa Fe. She was the first female imaging voice on 1010WINS in New York which lasted for more than three years.

=== On Stage ===
Smaldone's other notable roles include Kara Angelo, a character she created in the play she co-wrote, entitled “Spit it Out!” She has performed in several acclaimed Off-Broadway plays: “Spalding Gray: Stories Left to Tell” at the Minetta Lane Theatre, “Naked in a Fishbowl” at the Soho Playhouse, “Broadway’s Next Hit Musical” at The Triad, and “Girl Talk: The Musical” at the Midtown Theatre, has participated in several readings featuring celebrities like Mario Cantone, Ralph Macchio, and Ally Sheedy, and was an onstage celebrity guest in the Broadway hit, “The 25th Annual Putnam County Spelling Bee.”

== Filmography ==
| Year | Title | Role | Notes |
|---|---|---|---|
| 1983 | Born in Flames | TV Newscaster | Example |
| 2005 | The Investigators | Narrator | Episode: Death of a Rising Star |
| 2010 | Poetry Man | Prosecutor | Short Film |
| 2010 | Naked in a Fishbowl | Kara | Episode: A Face for Radio |
| 2013 | The Following | TV Reporter #1 | 2 Episodes |
| 2013 | Fatal Encounters | Narrator | Episode: Trained to Kill |
| 2015 | Figs for Italo | Diane Morretti | Short Film |
| 2015 | Blue Bloods | Leah Powell | Episode: Rush to Judgement |
| 2018 | Manifest | News Anchor | Episode: Turbulence |
| 2020 | Tommy | Reporter | |

== Theatre ==
| Year | Title | Role |
|---|---|---|
| 2006 | The Vagina Monologues | Actor |
| 2006-2010 | Spit it Out! a play with music | Kara, also co-writer |
| 2007 | Spalding Gray: Stories Left to Tell | Celebrity |
| 2009 | Broadway's Next Hit Musical | Guest Performer |
| 2009 | Naked in a Fishbowl | Guest Performer |
| 2010 | Girl Talk: The Musical | Crystal |
| 2012 | The Guido Monologues | Marie |
| 2013 | Whatta Ya Nuts! | Dr. Sheila |
| 2014 | 15 Minutes of Shame | Woman |

== Personal life ==
Smaldone has been in a relationship with Richard Steinhaus, Jr, since 2001. She has an older sister, Dr. Laurie Smaldone Alsup who is a non-practicing oncologist, former cancer researcher and CFO of an international company. Smaldone was diagnosed with early-stage ovarian cancer on April 30, 2001, and after her recovery became a patient advocate and speaker.

== Awards and nominations ==
Smaldone has received a wide array of accolades for her work in radio, hosting, media & film, charitable causes, and cancer awareness.

- Quill Award for Professional Achievement, Mercy College
- Italian Heritage and Culture Committee, Il Leone di San Marco Award for Achievement in Radio
- World Foundation for Medical Studies in Female Health, for work with Ovarian Cancer awareness
- AWRT, Golden Apple Award for Achievement in Radio
- Italian Welfare League, Woman of the Year
- Five-time Billboard Magazine, Radio Personality of the Year
- Five-time Radio and Records, Radio Personality of the Year
- Three-time Metro Air Award Winner, Host of Specialty Show
