= Sutirtha Bhattacharya =

Indian chief executive

Sutirtha Bhattacharya is a 1985 batch IAS officer, who served as the Chairman & MD of Coal India Limited. Before taking charge of Coal India he was the CMD of state-owned Singareni Collieries Company. He was also the Chairperson of the West Bengal Electricity Regulatory Commission. Presently he is serving as the Chairman of West Bengal Electronics Industry Development Corporation Limited.

Bhattacharya has advocated coal pollution mitigation technology to reduce harmful environmental impacts, while still seeking to double coal production.

He graduated from Presidency College, Kolkata, as a graduating student of the University of Calcutta.
