= Deborah Shaffer =

American documentary filmmaker

Deborah Shaffer has a 50-year career as a documentary filmmaker.

She began making films in 1970s as a member of the Newsreel Collective, where she collaborated on the short film Make-Out. In 1972 she co-directed and co-produced the short How About You?, and in 1976 Chris and Bernie. Shaffer co-produced and co-directed her first feature documentary, The Wobblies, an oral and archival history of the Industrial Workers of the World in 1979, which premiered at the New York Film Festival and was inducted into the National Film Registry of the Library of Congress in 2021. She co-founded the distribution company First Run Features.

In 1983 Shaffer co-directed and co-produced Nicaragua: Report From the Front, and in 1985 she directed Witness to War: Dr. Charlie Clements, about an American doctor who turned against his role as an Air Force pilot in Vietnam, and became a doctor working behind the lines during the civil war in El Salvador. Witness to War: Dr. Charlie Clements was awarded the Academy Award for Best Short Documentary.

In 1987 she directed and co-produced Fire From the Mountain, based on the memoir of Nicaraguan revolutionary Omar Cabezas, which premiered at the New York Film Festival and played at Sundance. In 1989 she directed and co-produced Dance of Hope, about women and human rights in Chile, which premiered at Sundance.

In 2001 and 2002 Shaffer directed and co-produced 2 films about artists living in lower Manhattan and their response to the events of Sept. 11, From the Ashes: 10 Artists, which played at Sundance and the Tribeca Film Festival, and From the Ashes: Epilogue which played at Tribeca.

In 2010 Shaffer was a co-producer and co-director of To Be Heard, which premiered at DOC NYC, winning the Grand Jury Prize and the Audience Award. In 2019 Shaffer directed and co-produced Queen of Hearts: Audrey Flackwhich premiered at DOC NYC and won the Audience Award and Art and Culture Award at the Hamptons International Film Festival. In addition to her independent work as a director and producer, Shaffer has directed films for television including Secrets Underground (WGBH, 1994) which won a Christopher Award; 2 one-hour episodes of Art 21: Art for the 21st Century in 2003 (PBS), and Ladies First: The Women of Rwanda (co-director and writer) in 2004 (WNET) which won an Emmy. Shaffer has executive produced several films, including the Academy Award nominated short Asylum in 2004, and Very Semi Serious (HBO) in 2013.

In 1987 Shaffer was awarded a Guggenheim Fellowship, and in 2004 she received the Irene Diamond Lifetime Achievement Award for Human Rights Filmmaking from the Human Rights Watch Film Festival. She is a member of the Academy of Motion Picture Arts and Sciences. Shaffer was married to architect Larry Bogdanow (1947–2011); their daughter is Maya Shaffer Bogdanow.
