= Wildrose (film) =

1984 film by John Hanson

- Eichhorn as June Lorich
- Directed by: John Hanson
- Screenplay by: John Hanson; Eugene Corr
- Story by: John Hanson; Sandra Schulberg
- Produced by: Sandra Schulberg
- Starring: Lisa Eichhorn; Tom Bower
- Cinematography: Peter Stein
- Edited by: Arthur Coburn
- Music by: Gary Remal; Bernie Krause
- Production company: New Front Films
- Distributed by: Troma
- Release dates: February 22, 1984 (Berlin International Film Festival); March 25, 1984 (United States)
- Running time: 95 minutes
- Country: United States
- Language: English
- Budget: < $1 million

Wildrose is a 1984 American independent drama film directed by John Hanson, produced by New Front Films, and distributed by Troma. It stars Lisa Eichhorn and Tom Bower supported by a cast of largely nonprofessional actors, and is predominantly set and filmed in Minnesota's Iron Range.

== Plot ==
Recently divorced from her abusive alcoholic husband (Stephen Yoakam), June's (Lisa Eichhorn) job as a miner in Minnesota's Mesabi Range becomes more challenging because of harassment from her male colleagues and a lack of support from her mother. She considers her independence, her family, and her future with fellow miner Rick (Tom Bower) as she develops a romantic relationship with him.

== Cast ==
- Lisa Eichhorn as June Lorich
- Tom Bower as Rick Ogaard
- Jim Cada as Pavich
- Cinda Jackson as Karen
- Dan Nemanick as Ricotti
- Lydia Olson as Katri Sippola
- Bill Schoppert as Timo Maki
- James Stowell as Doobie
- Stephen Yoakam as Billy
- Vienna Maki as Vienna Lorich
- Frankie Smoltz as Frank Lorich
- Clinton Maxwell as Chris Ogaard
- Ernest Tomatz as Nolan
- Marie Nelson as Marie Ogaard
- Father Frank Perkovich as himself

== Production ==
The film was shot on location in Minnesota's Mesabi Iron Range, including town scenes in Eveleth. Other scenes were filmed in Bayfield, Wisconsin.

It was made for under $1 million (equivalent to $3.1 million in 2025).

== Release and reception ==
The film was selected for the Museum of Modern Art's New Films/New Directors series, and was a finalist for the Critics Prize at the Venice Film Festival. Tom Bower was nominated for the Independent Spirit Award for Best Male Lead. It screened out of competition at the Berlin Film Festival and at the Boston Film Festival.

Ms. magazine called it "[as] visually rich as it is emotionally resonant." The Los Angeles Times review wrote that the "small core of professional actors creates collides with the film's numerous self-conscious non-professionals, who inadvertently remind us that Eichhorn, Bower and others are, after all, 'acting' ... But the pluses outweigh the minuses." Variety called Eichhorn's performance "moving, natural ... in a decidedly unglamorous role" and praised the camerawork as "extraordinary, vivid."

== See also ==
- Ruby in Paradise
- North Country
