= Paturi Paul Williams =

Indian civil servant (1943–2016)

1966 batch; Andhra Pradesh cadre P. P. Williams, IAS

Special Chief Secretary, Government of Andhra Pradesh
- In office 1 June 1999 – 31 March 2000

Director-General, Dr. Marri Channa Reddy Human Resource Development Institute of Telangana
- In office 5 August 1996 – 7 December 1996
- Preceded by: V. K. Srinivasan
- Succeeded by: P. V. Rao

Chairperson cum Managing Director, Singareni Collieries Company
- In office 24 August 1992 – 30 January 1996
- Preceded by: R. V. Krishnan
- Succeeded by: M. C. Mahapatra

Chairperson, Tobacco Board
- In office 20 January 1986 – 1 June 1990
- Preceded by: M. C. Mahapatra
- Succeeded by: P. Ramakantha Reddy

Managing Director, Andhra Pradesh State Handloom Weavers Cooperative Society
- In office 26 March 1984 – 1 January 1986

Managing Director, Andhra Pradesh Dairy Development Co-operative Federation Limited
- In office 23 October 1982 – 1 April 1983

Managing Director, Andhra Pradesh Meat and Poultry Development Corporation
- In office 5 November 1979 – 1 January 1982

Collector - in - Nalgonda district
- In office 8 April 1974 – 15 April 1976
- Preceded by: Y. Venugopal Reddy
- Succeeded by: T. Nagarathnam

Personal details
- Born: Paturi Paul Williams; 2 July 1943 Pedaravuru, Northern Circars, Madras Presidency
- Died: 22 August 2016 (aged 73) Hyderabad, Telangana
- Spouse: Smt. Nirmala
- Parent(s): Smt. Vivekavathy and Sri Paturi Paulus
- Relatives: Sri P. Rajaratnam (ISRO Space Scientist), Sri Paturi Joseph (Educator), Sri Paturi Paul Daniel (Media Personality), Sri John Paul Paturi (Industrialist)
- Education: B.Sc. (Andhra), M.Sc. (Andhra)
- Alma mater: Sir C.R. Reddy College, Eluru (West Godavari district); Andhra University, Waltair (Visakhapatnam district)
- Occupation: Civil servant
- Profession: Retired IAS officer
- Known for: Reviving public sector units
- Portfolio: Industries
- Awards: NCCI-Award of honour

Paturi Paul Williams (2 July 1943 - 22 August 2016) was a 1966 batch Indian Administrative Service (IAS) officer of the Andhra Pradesh cadre, best known for his administration in Public sector undertakings in India, especially in Andhra Pradesh, significantly, as the 29th Chairperson cum Managing Director of State-owned Singareni Collieries Company. During the 1990s, he had been credited with turning a loss-making unit into one that achieved profits.

== Early life ==
Williams was born in Pedaravuru, Northern Circars, a division of erstwhile Madras Presidency in 1943, in what is now present Andhra Pradesh. He pursued an undergraduate course in sciences with a B. Sc. majoring in Botany from Sir C.R. Reddy College, Eluru (West Godavari district). Williams continued his studies to the postgraduate level specializing in Zoology at Andhra University, Waltair (Visakhapatnam district), which awarded him with an M. Sc. After his studies, Williams interned at the AELC-Andhra Christian College, Guntur and at the CBM-McLaurin High School, Kakinada. He was also preparing for civil services, eventually succeeding in his second attempt. He got trained at National Academy of Administration, Mussorie and was inducted on 2 July 1966 into Indian Administrative Service and allotted Andhra Pradesh cadre.

== Career ==
From 1966, Williams began serving as a civil servant in Andhra Pradesh. His career spanned four decades, until his retirement in 2000 before the New Millennium began.

=== 1966-1975 ===
During the first decade of his career, Williams was a Junior scale level Officer appointed on 1 July 1968. He served as Sub-Collector in Bhoodan, appointed on 17 February 1969 in erstwhile Nizamabad district. In 1971, he was elevated to the level of under-Secretary. From 15 September 1971, he was District Revenue Officer in Nalgonda district. On 1 April 1974, he was again elevated to the level of Collector and assumed the office of Collector - in - Nalgonda district on 8 April 1974, serving for two years until 15 April 1976.

=== 1976-1985 ===
At the onset of the second decade of William's career, he was elevated to the position of Deputy Secretary on 1 April 1976 and on 23 April 1976, Williams was made Deputy Secretary, Finance and Planning wing of Government of Andhra Pradesh. By 1979, he rose to the level of Director. This decade of William's career saw him take up key positions in State-owned enterprises as managing director, beginning with Andhra Pradesh Meat and Poultry Development Corporation from November 1979. In 1981, he contributed a bulletin of Central Marine Fisheries Research Institute with an essay entitled, Present status of small-scale (traditional) marine fisheries in Andhra Pradesh. He then was transferred on 23 October 1982 to Andhra Pradesh Dairy Development Co-operative Federation Limited. By 1983, he again got elevated as Joint Secretary and was transferred on 26 March 1984 to Andhra Pradesh State Handloom Weavers Cooperative Society.

=== 1986-1995 ===
A major breakthrough came during the third decade when he was on central deputation from 1986 through 1990. He became Chairperson of Tobacco Board, Guntur on 20 January 1986, where he was actively involved with the board. Continuing his spree with public-sector units, Williams was made Chairperson cum Managing Director of Singareni Collieries Company on 24 August 1992, serving until 30 January 1996.

=== 1996-retirement ===
During the final decade of his career spanning more than three decades, William rose to the level of Additional Secretary in 1996 and was made Commissioner of Public Enterprises and was Director-General of Dr. Marri Channa Reddy Human Resource Development Institute of Telangana for a short period from 5 August 1996 through 7 December 1996. He was elevated to the level of Secretary, Government of Andhra Pradesh and was designated as Special Chief Secretary and Commissioner of Public Enterprises Management Board, a post which he held until the new millennium, before relinquishing it on voluntary grounds on 31 March 2000.

== Honorary activities ==
In spite of his busy career as a civil servant, Williams also devoted time for philanthropic and cultural activities on a voluntary basis. Williams was a communicant-member of Samavesam of Telugu Baptist Churches attached to STBC-Baptist Church, Narayanaguda. He was also founder-trustee with Rev. G. Samuel, STBC, of Hyderabad Baptist Trust a public charity registered in 1991.

Williams was a patron of United Christmas Celebrations (UCC), an annual gathering of Catholic, Orthodox, Protestant and the New and Indigenous Churches in Telangana and Andhra Pradesh. In 1992, during the tenure of Kotla Vijaya Bhaskara Reddy as Chief Minister of Andhra Pradesh, Williams was Chairperson of the UCC and conducted the event at CSI-Wesley Junior College Auditorium at Prenderghast Road in Secunderabad under the bishopric of Samineni Arulappa, RCM and Peter Sugandhar, CSI.

After the Andhra Christian Theological College relocated from the river town Rajahmundry to Secunderabad in 1973, efforts were made by faculty representing Canadian Baptist Ministries to create a fellowship of those Christians hailing from Churches established by CBM in the northern circars. This fructified in 1978 with the leadership of E. Joshua, a Government Lecturer, and regular Church gatherings used to take place in Lakdi ka pul locality in rented premises. In 1996, Williams laid the foundation stone for CBM-Emmanuel Baptist Worship Centre in Tolichowki locality and the new edifice was inaugurated in 2001 in the presence of Clergy led by the Old Testament Scholar, G. Babu Rao, CBCNC. Williams and his younger brother Paturi John Paul, an Industrialist, took part in the inauguration dedicating the Altar and Balcony.

== Retirement, honours and death ==
After retirement from civil service, Williams continued to reside in Hyderabad. He used to visit rural congregations and preach in the Churches. In 2014, centenary celebrations of National Council of Churches in India, an ecumenical body of Orthodox, Protestant and New and Indigenous Churches was convened by Roger Gaikwad, PCI. Preparations for regional celebrations in Hyderabad were made by Jetti Oliver, the local host at Andhra Christian Theological College in Secunderabad, where Bishop Taranath Sagar, MCI presented an award of honour on September 12, 2014 to Williams in the presence of Clergy comprising Geevarghese Mor Coorilose, JSCC. The plaque presented read,

...in recognition of P. P. William's contribution to the society in dispensing civil service responsibilities with Christian integrity and excellence.

Williams died on 22 August 2016 at the age of 73. His Funeral mass was held at STBC-Baptist Church, Narayanaguda led by G. Samuel, STBC Senior Pastor. He was buried at Protestant Cemetery in Narayanaguda locality.
