= Charles Webb (chef) =

American chef

- Born: Charles Webb; 1970 (age 55–56); Chicago, USA
- Culinary career
- Award won: #1 Private Chef in Chicago
- Website: chefcharleswebb.com

Charles Webb (born in Chicago, 1970) is an American celebrity chef, entrepreneur and creator of a travel and food docuseries #ChefOnTour with Charles Webb.

He is also known as an International Jet set Chef.

== Early life ==
Charles Webb was born in Chicago, US, in 1970. He was raised in San Antonio, Texas, and Irapuato, Guanajuato, Mexico as an only child. His father was a tattoo artist and his mother worked in retail. Webb's parents divorced in 1978, and his father had been absent for more than 10 years. At an early age, Webb attempted to sell his artwork to raise extra money for his family.

Webb learned how to cook at the age of 8. His mother worked a full-time job which forced him to learn how to survive long periods alone. His mother only allowed fresh ingredients in their kitchen, which resulted in many of Charles' dishes like homemade Tacos di Picadillo.

== Career ==
Webb's corporate business career started as an effort to gain financial stability. After leaving the European School of Economics in Rome, Webb started working in finance on Wall Street for Oppenheimer & Co in 1999. In 2000, Webb and Oppenheimer parted ways and Webb spent two years in New York's restaurant scene, which he then followed by a sabbatical in Brazil. He moved to Rio de Janeiro, Brazil in 2002. There he cooked with the fishermen in Búzios, Brazil and worked at Casas Brancas Hotel & Spa. After that, he attempted to sell real estate and taught English for two years in Búzios. In 2005, he returned to Rome again and started learning his trade as a chef at The Gambero Rosso Culinary Academy. He moved to Copenhagen, Denmark in 2006 and began to work at one of the best restaurants in the world Noma and later at Era Opa, a two-Michelin star Italian restaurant. He worked in many restaurants such as Mercer Kitchen, Steak Frites, TJA, Canteen in New York, Noma, Era Ora, L'Olivo in Copenhagen, Princess Iolanthe in the South of France, Scoozi, Michael Jordan Restaurant, Frontera Grill, Smith&Wollensky in Chicago, Casas Brancas, Bar Do Ze in Buzios, Landrys, Boudros in San Antonio, Pestifer in Cannes, and Baboon in Monaco.

In 2007, Charles moved to Nice, France, by the invitation of his friend to live in his house, and worked as a private chef on mega yachts and villas in the Côte d'Azur for the Uber-affluent.

During the last 20 years, Charles Webb has lived in nine countries and changed more than 92 jobs at all. He speaks four languages.

=== Business ===
In late 2009, Charles Webb came back to Chicago and three years later he founded the Avanti Gourmet Catering creating brand activations and dinners globally. The company services a variety of food and beverage needs from corporate events to intimate weddings and holiday gatherings with an emphasis on the "experience".

Webb supports several foundations and non-profits (Gastromotiva in Rio de Janeiro) and local and national groups such as Easter Seals, Make A Wish Foundation, Lynn Sage Foundation, One Goal, RFK Foundation, Lurie Children's Hospital and One Million Degrees. Philanthropy is the key part of the #ChefOnTour mission to open small local non-profits and increase social engagement.

In 2017, Charles created the lifestyle, gastro and travel docuseries #ChefOnTour (previously named Ringmaster digital) which creates digital content and shows how food affects the culture approach.

The docuseries are made in different formats; like showing the city through its markets; or short interviews with influencers and tastemakers in sustainability, tech, street art, LGBTQ etc. As of November 2021, Webb has filmed in Panama, Bogotá, Rio de Janeiro and is currently filming in Barcelona.

== Awards ==
#1 Private Chef in Chicago by Modern Luxury Magazine

== Personal life ==
He met his ex-wife, Suzanna, when he was in Brazil. The couple divorced in 2009.
