= Velal =

Coordinates: 18°44′42″N 79°40′19″E

Velal is a village in Jaipur mandal, Mancherial district, Telangana state, India. It is the location of the Sri Gattu Mallanna Swamy Temple that is notable for the Maha Shivaratri festival.

== Velal Mallanna Swamy Temple ==
Local lore says that the Sri Mallanna Swamy temple, sited on a hillock in Velal, is centuries old. It is known for the three-day-long Maha Shivaratri festivities, which take place around February and attract in excess of 100,000 devotees of Shiva from various parts of northern Telangana, including Adilabad, Karimnagar and Nizamabad districts.

As a part of tradition, devotees take a holy dip in the river and then prepare Bonalu (special sweet food made with rice and jaggery) on the hillock using water from the nearby Godavari River. They present it to presiding deity Shiva in the temple. Similarly, people congregate at the holy place during the jathara conducted during the Shivaratri festival. They participate in shopping and recreation.
