= Co-optex =

Indian handloom weaver cooperative

The Tamil Nadu Handloom Weavers' Co-operative Society Limited
- Trade name: Co-optex
- Company type: Government undertaking
- Industry: Handlooms
- Founded: 1935
- Headquarters: Chennai, Tamil Nadu, India
- Key people: Deepak Jacob IAS (Managing Director)
- Owner: Government of Tamil Nadu
- Website: www.cooptex.gov.in

The Tamil Nadu Handloom Weavers' Cooperative Society, popularly known as Co-optex, is a cooperative of traditional handloom weavers of the Indian state of Tamil Nadu. This is under the control of Department of Handlooms, Handicrafts, Textiles and Khadi (Tamil Nadu) of Government of Tamil Nadu. The organisation owns a number of shopping outlets in Tamil Nadu. Co-Optex also has an international arm, Co-optex International which exports its products to Germany, France, Netherlands, Belgium, Spain, Switzerland, Canada, Greece, Hong Kong, U.K., South Africa and the U.A.E.

== See also ==
- Khadi
- Khādī Development and Village Industries Commission (Khadi Gramodyog)
- Government of Tamil Nadu
