= Louise Smith (theatre artist) =

American playwright and actress

- Occupation(s): Playwright, actress

Louise Smith is an American playwright and actress. She graduated with a Bachelor of Arts in Theater from Antioch College in 1977.

Smith won an Obie Award in 2003 for her work in Painted Snake in a Painted Chair and was nominated for an Independent Spirit Award in 1987 for Best Female Lead in the film Working Girls. She received a 1990 Bessie Award for her work in Ping Chong's Brightness.

Smith chaired the Antioch College Department of Theater for 14 years, from 1994 to 2008. She taught at the Nonstop Liberal Arts Institute during Antioch College's struggle for independence following its closure in 2008, and then served as the Dean of Community Life when Antioch College reopened before returning to teaching as a professor of performance.

== Filmography ==
- 1986 - Working Girls
- 1989 - Against the Innocent
- 2003 - Gravel
