= First Run Features =

American film distribution company

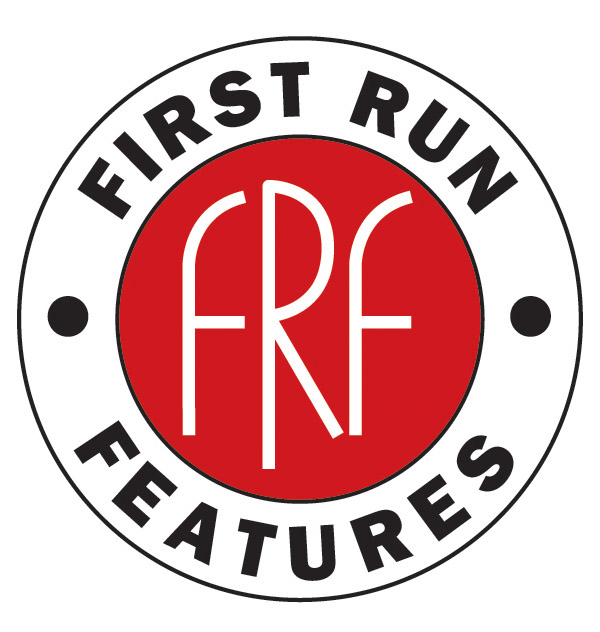
- Industry: Film distribution
- Founded: 1979
- Headquarters: New York, NY, USA
- Products: Films, VOD, DVDs, Blu-rays
- Website: http://www.firstrunfeatures.com

First Run Features is an independent film distribution company based in New York City.

== History ==
First Run was founded in 1979 by a group of filmmakers in order to advance the distribution of independent film. The group included Barry Alexander Brown (The War At Home, Maxi Cohen (Joe & Maxi), John Hanson and Rob Nilsson (Northern Lights) and Deborah Shaffer and Stewart Bird (The Wobblies). In the 1980s, the company focused on more mainstream documentaries and started distributing films on video.

It is one of America's largest independent distributors of documentaries and art films, releasing 12 to 15 films a year in theaters nationwide and 40 to 60 titles on DVD and VOD annually. First Run distributes a large number of documentaries and foreign films, including many films about LGBT issues, Jewish experience, and political and human rights issues.

First Run is the American distributor for Michael Apted's Up series, Ross McElwee's Sherman's March, the Oscar-nominated The Most Dangerous Man in America, Maidentrip, Girl Model, Eames: The Architect and the Painter, For the Bible Tells Me So, A Jihad for Love, God Loves Uganda , D. A. Pennebaker and Chris Hegedus's Kings of Pastry, Joe Berlinger's Crude, Alex Gibney and Eugene Jarecki's The Trials of Henry Kissinger, Alice, Save Me, Anita: Speaking Truth to Power and Moving Midway, among many others. Many of the films First Run Features has distributed have been endorsed by Human Rights Watch.

== Notable films ==
Year	Title
2016	A Matter of Time
2015	Welcome to Leith
2015	Troublemakers: The Story of Land Art
2015	The Looking Glass
2013	A Girl and a Gun
2012	Pink Ribbons, Inc.
2011	The Man Nobody Knew
2010	The Most Dangerous Man in America
2009	Crude
2009	Ballerina
2009	Altiplano
2009	A Wink and a Smile
2008	Moving Midway
2008	A Jihad for Love
2008	Constantine's Sword
2008	Praying with Lior
2007	For the Bible Tells Me So
2007	Save Me
2007	The Power of Forgiveness
2007	Please Vote for Me
2007	Breaking the Maya Code
2004	Howard Zinn: You Can't Be Neutral on a Moving Train
2003	Bonhoeffer
2002	The Butterfly
2001	Venus Boyz
2001	The Fluffer
1999	Gendernauts
1999	After Stonewall
1995	Whitewash
1993	Speak Up! It's So Dark
1992	Utz
1992	Alice
1991	The Architecture of Doom
1986	Sherman's March
1984	Before Stonewall
1983	Wild Style
1979	The War at Home
1975	A Boy and his Dog

== Sources ==
- First Run Features website
- First Run Features box office
