= Rob Nilsson =

American filmmaker

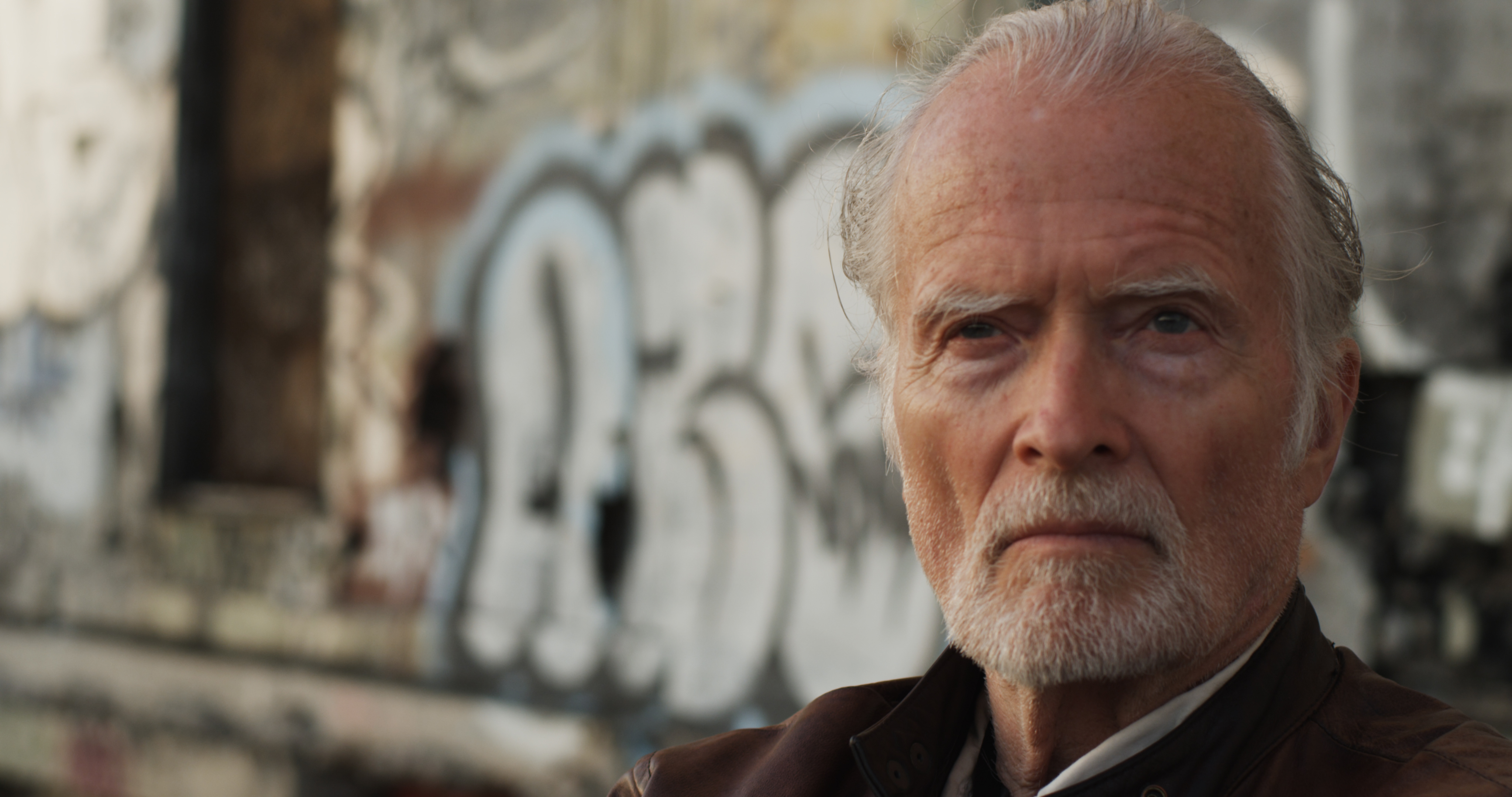
- Born: October 29, 1939 (age 87); Rhinelander, Wisconsin, U.S.
- Occupations: Film director; actor; poet; painter
- Years active: 1978–present
- Awards: Caméra d'Or, Cannes; 1979 Northern Lights; Sundance Grand Jury Prize: Dramatic; 1988 Heat and Sunlight
- Website: robnilsson.com

Rob Nilsson (born October 29, 1939) is a filmmaker, poet and painter, best known for his feature film Northern Lights, co-directed with John Hanson and winner of the Camera d’Or at the Cannes Film Festival (1979). He also is known for directing and playing the lead role in Heat and Sunlight, produced by Steve and Hildy Burns, also featuring Consuelo Faust, Don Bajema and Ernie Fosseliius. Heat and Sunlight won the Grand Jury Prize Dramatic at the Sundance Film Festival in 1988, and his 9 @ Night Film Cycle won the 2008 San Francisco Film Critics Circle Marlon Riggs Award for Courage and Vision in Cinema. Nilsson has also received Lifetime Achievement awards from the Fargo International Film Festival, the St. Louis International Film Festival, the Kansas City Filmmaker's Jubilee, the Master's Award from the Golden Apricot Film Festival, a Filmmaker of the Year Award from the Silver Lake Film Festival and the Milley Award from the city of Mill Valley for accomplishment in the Arts.

The 9 @ Night Film Cycle is a cinematic epic of nine feature films about 40-50 fictional characters living on the rough edges of American society. Consisting of fourteen and a half hours of film shot over the course of fourteen years, all films were produced with members of the Tenderloin Action Group (1992–97) and the Tenderloin yGroup (1998-2009). Each film takes a unique aesthetic approach to its subject, and all nine films depict a world of the homeless, recently homeless and inner city residents, played by workshop members, local actors and established talents such as Robert Viharo and Ron Perlman. This melting-pot of interlocking feature films was shot in diverse locations: Tenderloin hotels and alleys, East Bay homeless encampments and hobo jungles in the Nevada desert. What Mad Pursuit (2013), a feature documentary directed by Denny Dey, is an analysis of the 9 @ Night films, showing how they weave together to form one master work.

Nilsson is also a painter and a poet whose book of poetry From a Refugee of Tristan Da Cunha is a collection of his life's work. In 2013, he published Wild Surmise: A Dissident View, featuring his ideas and experiences in the world of art and cinema. A currently in-progress documentary directed by Michael Edo Keane follows Nilsson's career and will document the making of his new film, Love Twice, a love story set in the Caribbean.

== Early life ==
Born Robin Nelson in Northern Wisconsin in 1939, Nilsson is the grandson of Frithjof Holmboe, an early American documentary filmmaker. His family moved to California in 1954, where Nilsson was president of the 1957 graduating class at Tamalpais High School, Mill Valley. He also ran track and cross country, and was first chair trumpet in the school band. He attended college from 1957–1962 at Harvard, where he began to write poetry, and subsequently won a prize from the American Academy of Poets for his poem “From a Refugee of Tristan Da Cunha.” During a year spent away from school, where he worked on Swedish freighters and hitchhiked through Europe, Nilsson began painting.

After a brief stint working for the American civil rights movement in Mississippi, he traveled to Nigeria to work as an English teacher, where he began to make films. In 1965, he made The Lesson, an hourlong dramatic 8 mm spoof of Neocolonialism that has since been lost. He then spent a year writing and painting on an island off the coast of Cameroon, then called Fernando Pó, now called Malabo. He had a show of his paintings at the Ayuntamiento in Santa Isabel, the capital of the former Spanish Equatorial Guinea.

== Early works ==
Living in Boston in 1968, he made The Country Mouse, a 16 mm hourlong dramatic film which imagined Boston city layabouts and misfits as mice. In 1969 he returned to San Francisco and changed his name to Nilsson to avoid being confused with filmmaker Robert Nelson. He helped found the San Francisco film collective Cine Manifest, active throughout the 1970s, where his first dramatic feature film, Northern Lights (1979), detailed the struggles of North Dakota farmers in 1915 who fought the domination of the Eastern banks, railroads and the grain business. After self-distributing Northern Lights, he co-founded the distribution company First Run Features.

That was followed by Nilsson's landmark independent film, Signal 7 (1984), dedicated to John Cassavetes. It was the first small-format video feature film to be transferred to 35 mm for theatrical release, and was produced by Don Taylor and Ben Myron and presented by Francis Ford Coppola. The film was shot over the course of four nights and premiered at the Telluride Film Festival.

Nilsson's On The Edge (1985) featured Bruce Dern and Pam Grier. Roger Ebert wrote of the film: "It would all be very predictable, I thought, but I was wrong. On the Edge may have a familiar formula, but it is an angry, original, unpredictable movie. And it's not about winning. It's about the reasons that athletes carry in their hearts after all strength and reason have fled.”

== Later life and work ==
Heat and Sunlight (1988) featured Nilsson in the lead role as Mel Hurley, a photographer in the midst of the last days of the Nigerian Civil War.

In 1992, Nilsson moved into a transient hotel south of Market Street in San Francisco, motivated by a search for his missing brother. There, he wrote Hope For The Fourth Ace and helped found the Tenderloin Action Group along with Rand Crook and Ethan Sing. An acting workshop for homeless and inner city residents, The Tenderloin Action Group met weekly and provided the foundation for Nilsson's Direct Action Cinema filmmaking method as well as the production of Chalk, a feature film cast with workshop members and local actors. The film was produced by Crook and Sing and shot by Nilsson's long time collaborator, DP Mickey Freeman. Chalk explores the underworld of pool hustlers and follows a renegade from the Professional Tour (Don Bajema) who challenges a local player (Kelvin Han Yee).

Soon after, Nilsson moved to the Golden Gate YMCA, where the workshop was re-christened the Tenderloin yGroup, free and open to all, emphasizing expressivity, strong emotion and improvisational skills. Along with colleagues Chikara Motomura, Kevin Winterfield and Mira Larkin, Nilsson ran weekly acting workshops and continued work on his 9 @ Night Film Cycle. The Tenderloin yGroup later moved to the Faithful Fools Street Ministry on Hyde Street, run by Carmen Barsody and Kay Jorgensen.

Seven of the 9 @ Night films – Stroke (2000), Singing (2000), Scheme C6 (2001), Need (2004), Pan (2006), Used (2007) and Go Together (2007), many of which were shot by Mickey Freeman - had their world premieres at the Mill Valley Film Festival. Attitude premiered at the Hong Kong International Film Festival in 2003 and Noise at the Virginia Film Festival, also in 2003. The world premiere of all nine features screened together was held at the Harvard Film Archive in 2007. The series played in Bay Area theaters in 2008 and won the San Francisco Film Critic's Circle Marlon Riggs Award that same year. David and Carol Richards were executive producers on many of the 9 @ Night films.

== Direct Action World Cinema ==
Direct Action World Cinema is Nilsson's collection of five feature films shot in different countries and locations. In collaboration with Studio Malaparte in Japan, Nilsson completed the first film in the collection, Winter Oranges, shot off the coast of Hiroshima on Sagi Island. Winter Oranges had its world premiere at the Fukuoka Film Archive in March 2000 and its US premiere at the Mill Valley Film Festival in October 2000.

In September 2000, Nilsson shot Samt in Jordan, working with a cast of young people assembled by ZENID, a Jordanian institute striving for social development. Samt had its world premiere at the Mill Valley Film Festival in 2004. In November 2003, Nilsson, in conjunction with Resfest South Africa, shot Frank Dead Souls in Cape Town locations with a cast selected from towns, townships, squatter camps and art communities.

On September 11, 2005, the Pacific Film Archive hosted the world premiere of Security, shot during Nilsson's residency at the University of California, Berkeley. The film details the paranoia and insecurities of college students post 9/11. Security won the Audience Award at GreenCine's DIVX Film Festival, the first internationally juried film festival created for the internet. Many of the film's students, such as Brett Simon, Debbie Heimowitz and David Herrera, have gone on to successful careers in film.

On April 7, 2006, the Kansas City Filmmaker's Jubilee presented Opening, sponsored and produced by the festival, as its opening night film.

== Feature documentaries ==
In 1988, Nilsson made Words For The Dying, a documentary feature film produced by David Donoghue and Ireland’s Windmill Lane. The documentary follows John Cale and Brian Eno through the Netherlands, Moscow, Wales and London as they create a record featuring lyrics from Dylan Thomas’s poetry, with music composed by Cale and produced by Eno. A battle between Nilsson and Eno runs throughout the film, as it is later discovered that Eno didn't know about the documentary and didn't want to participate.

Nilsson's feature documentary What Happened Here (2011) centers on the life of Leon Trotsky. The film had its world premiere at the Mill Valley Film Festival and played in the cinematheques of Tel Aviv, Jerusalem and Haifa in 2012. The film follows Nilsson, producer Olga Zurzhenko and Mickey Freeman as they search for the spot of Trotsky's vanished birthplace on the Ukrainian Steppes. There, they find the long abandoned site of Koloniya Gromokley, which was founded by Trotsky's father and was the location of a forgotten 1941 Nazi Einsatzgruppen pogrom. Eventually, this leads Nilsson to Israel to meet Mikhael Derenkovski, the last survivor of the atrocity, who now lives in the Golan Heights.

== Television work ==
Nilsson has appeared as minor roles in numerous television shows, starting in 1986 as the character Wango Mack in the Miami Vice series 3 episode Better Living Through Chemistry.

Later in 1988, Nilsson directed the first three episodes of The Street (MCA/Universal) a cinema verite style police drama about cops on the Newark graveyard shift. Featuring Stanley Tucci, Ron Ryan and Bruce MacVittie, Nilsson set the tone for the series, heavily influenced as it was by his film Signal 7.

Nilsson also directed and adapted Rod Serling's script A Town Has Turned to Dust (1998) into a feature film for the USA Network. Working with cinematographer Mickey Freeman, the film was a post-apocalyptic feature about life on earth after humans have emigrated to the asteroids. Town was produced by Nell Nugent and featured Stephen Lang, Ron Perlman and Judy Collins. The film features CGI color schemes created on location in Utah at the last surviving full-scale steel mill west of the Mississippi.

== Films from 2007–present ==
Beginning in 2007, Nilsson collaborated with his workshop and other organizations to bring the 9 @ Night Film Cycle to completion. The Tenderloin yGroup was the model for Nilsson's next workshop, the Berkeley-based Citizen Cinema Player's Ensemble.

Presque Isle (2007) is a narrative feature written and directed by Nilsson, edited by Milena Grozeva Levy, and shot on location in the Santa Cruz Mountains and Northern Wisconsin by Mickey Freeman. The executive producer of the film was Jeremiah Birnbaum, and it was co-produced by the San Francisco School of Digital Filmmaking, Fog City Pictures and Citizen Cinema. The film premiered at the Mill Valley Film Festival.

Imbued (2009) is a narrative feature produced by Michelle Anton Allen, shot by Freeman, and featuring Stacy Keach, Liz Sklar and Allen. The film had its world premiere at the Mill Valley Film Festival. Special screenings and theatrical openings followed in Syracuse, Kansas City, Armenia and Moscow.

Sand (2010) features Irit Levi and William Martin from the Citizen Cinema Player's Ensemble. It won four awards for acting and directing at the Syracuse International Film Festival in 2010.

The Steppes (2011), featuring Irit Levi and produced by Levi, Joel Simone and Nilsson, was included in the Perspectives Competition of the Moscow International Film Festival, which also honored Nilsson with a 2011 Retrospective. The film won three awards for acting and directing at the Syracuse International Film Festival and the Moscow Press Award from the Russia Abroad Film Festival.

What Happened Here (2011) is a documentary, road movie and personal essay shot by Nilsson and Freeman about the life of Leon Trotsky. Aryeh Levin writer and former Israeli Ambassador to the Soviet Union, stated he would "put it in the ranks of Shoah." The documentary premiered at Mill Valley Film Festival and the Tel Aviv Film Festival.

Maelstrom (2012) was produced by Allen and made in collaboration with the Citizen Cinema Player's Ensemble and Marshall Spight's Meets the Eye Productions. The film received its world premiere at the Mill Valley Film Festival, where Nilsson received the festival's Lifetime Award, and was also screened at the Syracuse International Film Festival, where it won three awards for acting and directing and Nilsson received the Sophia Lifetime Achievement Award.

A Leap to Take (2013) is an experimental feature film with twenty-one speaking roles, twenty-five extras and eight locations, including a moving London bus. The film's principal photography was shot in three and a half hours by Freeman and cameraman Vincent Leddy. It was produced with Celik Kayalar's Film Acting Bay Area and the Citizen Cinema Player's Ensemble, and premiered at the Moscow International Film Festival.

Collapse (2013) another Direct Action World Cinema film, was produced by Nilsson and Allen, shot and edited by Deniz Demirer, and cast with current and past principal dancers from the San Francisco Ballet and members of the Citizen Cinema Player's Ensemble. The film had its North American premiere at the Mill Valley Film Festival in October, and its world premiere at the Love Is Folly Film Festival in Varna, Bulgaria.

A Bridge to a Border, also made with Nilsson's Direct Action World Cinema method, focuses on domestic terrorism and was produced by Michelle Anton Allen, Marshall Spight and Nilsson. It was shot by Chris Damm and Galina Pasternak, with additional cinematographers Gustavo Ochoa, Mickey Freeman, Vincent Leddy and Luis de la Para. The film was edited by Ochoa, de la Parra and Faith Vasquez, and will have its world premiere at the Mill Valley Film Festival in the fall of 2014.

Permission to Touch (2015) is an experimental feature shot in a single day featuring T. Moon as a performance artist who hires Rob Nilsson (reprising his role as photographer Mel Hurley in Heat and Sunlight) to shoot erotic pictures of her for a gallery show.

Nilsson completed three features in 2016, including Love Twice, featuring Deniz Demirer as a frustrated screenwriter plagued by his fictional characters who refuse to accept the roles he assigns them (also featuring John Cale, Carl Lumbly and Jeff Kao) with editing by Daniel Kremer. DEVISED is a feature shot entirely at Marshall Spight's Meets the Eye green screen studio featuring members of the Citizen Cinema Players Workshop including Deniz Demirer, Ravi Valleti, Michelle Anton Allen, Lydia Becker, Shiva Ghaemi and Howard Teich, with Ryan Leaneagh as Director of Photography and editor. Next Week in Bologna was conceived, cast and shot in one week with students from the International Filmmaking Academy in Bologna, Italy featuring Sophie Van Der Burg and Raffaello Rossini, produced by Owen and Christine Shapiro and edited by Daniel Kremer.

Fourth Movement (2017), a Citizen Cinema Players dramatic fiction film shot by Aaron Hollander and edited by Deepika Metkar, which takes place on election night, Nov. 8, 2016, and concerns people involved in the jazz music scene; it features Brette McCabe, Marianne Heath, Lydia Becker, Melanie Shaw, Menbere Aklilu, Paul Nicholas, Paul Greenberg, Tiziana Perinotti, Howard Teich and Audrey Shiva Ghaemi, with music by the Fred Randolph Sextet.

== Additional contributions ==
In the 2000s, Nilsson, along with his team of producers (David and Carol Richards, Marshall Spight, John Stout, Michelle Anton Allen, Joel Simone, Kevin Michael Winterfield), collaborators (DP Mickey Freeman, DP/Actor/Editor Deniz Demirer), and editors (Motomura, Arthur Vibert, Michael MacBroom, Karen Kinghan, Gustavo Ochoa, Luis de la Parra and Faith Vasquez), have carried on his Direct Action Cinema approach, focusing on character, circumstance and back-story improvisation, with the goal of documenting the lives of grass-roots survivors who live in the shadow of corporate America. A new 4K documentary about Nilsson, his cinematic practice and his collaborators is currently being produced by Michael Edo Keane and is projected for completion in early 2015.

In Nilsson's Res magazine articles, and in his book Wild Surmise: A Dissident View, he advocates an alternative to mainstream feature filmmaking. He says: “Hollywood-coholism is a disease, and we are all subject to it. It can only be cured by art which seeks personal catharsis, and which searches for ‘the way things seem to be;’ grass roots cinema about real people, engaged in the struggle for personal, political and spiritual survival.”
