= Northern Lights (1978 film) =

- Directed by: John Hanson; Rob Nilsson
- Produced by: Rob Nilsson; John Hanson
- Starring: Robert Behling; Susan Lynch; Joe Spano
- Cinematography: Judy Irola
- Music by: Ozzie Ahlers
- Distributed by: Cine Manifest
- Release date: July 12, 1978
- Country: United States
- Language: English

Northern Lights is a 1978 independent film that dramatizes the founding of the Nonpartisan League in North Dakota, a populist political movement in the American Midwest in the early 1900s.

== Production ==
The film was produced, directed, written and edited by John Hanson and Rob Nilsson, and starred Joe Spano, Robert Behling, Susan Lynch and Michel Wagner. It was filmed on location in North Dakota during the fall and winter of 1977, and used many locals as extras.

The filmmakers filmed in grainy black-and-white 16mm as a conscious rejection of Hollywood production values, and about a third of the dialogue is in Norwegian. Judy Irola's cinematography has been compared favorably to Days of Heaven.

Due to the extreme cold winter weather, with temperatures reaching as low as –40, many of the outdoor scenes had to be shot in short bursts, as cameras and other equipment only functioned for a short time before freezing up.

== Accolades ==
The film was awarded the Caméra d'Or at the 1979 Cannes Film Festival for best first feature film (defined as "the first feature film for theatrical screening (whatever the format; fiction, documentary or animation) of 60 minutes or more in length, by a director who has not made another film of 60 minutes or more in length and released theatrically."

== Reception and legacy ==
After self-releasing Northern Lights, John Hanson and Rob Nilsson co-founded the distribution company First Run Features.

== See also ==
- American Playhouse (which aired the film a decade later)
- Ingmar Bergman
- Social realism
