= Ravi Paturi =

Indian academic (1966–2012)

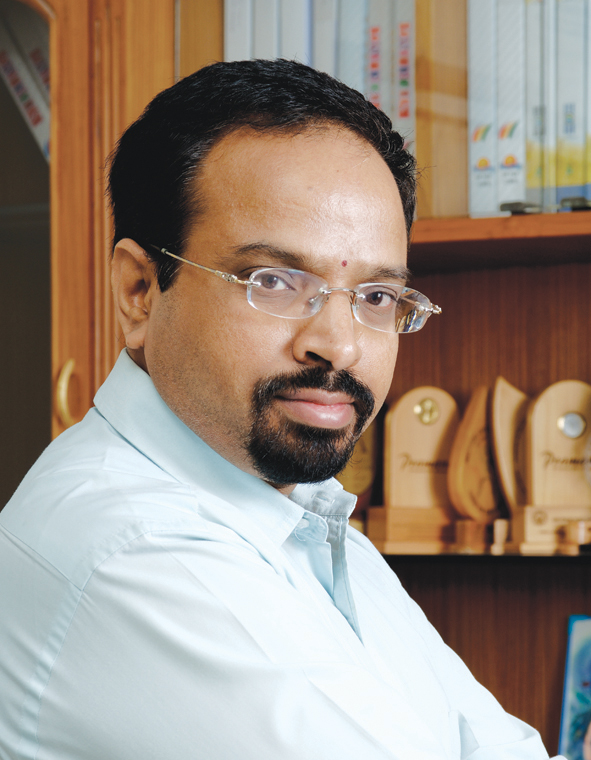
- Born: 28 June 1966
- Died: 7 September 2012 (aged 47)
- Education: Osmania University
- Occupation: Academician

Ravi Paturi was an academician from India. As a principal of Aurora Degree College and Business School, he contributed to the fields of research and literature.

== Life ==
Ravi was the last son of Paturi Sitaramanjaneyulu, a Sanskrit scholar from Adoni. He received a doctorate from Osmania University. He joined Aurora Degree College as the Principal in 1999, and continued working the post until his death. During his tenure he held good ties with premier institutes in India, such as The Centre for Cellular and Molecular Biology, The Indian Institute of Science, The Indian Academy of Sciences, and The University of Hyderabad. Ravi helped in propagation of sciences in Hyderabad.

== Death ==
On 5 September 2012, Ravi gave an interview to a local television channel. He went missing two days later, on the morning of 7 September. His body was found floating in Hussain Sagar Lake on 9 September. The cause of death was determined to be suicide, though other speculations were made.
