= Christina Lane =

American author and film scholar

Christina Lane is an American author and film scholar, best known for her research on women's representation in contemporary and classical Hollywood cinema. Her book Phantom Lady: Hollywood Producer Joan Harrison, the Forgotten Woman Behind Hitchcock won the 2021 Edgar Award for Best Critical/Biographical Work in 2021. Lane is Professor of Film Studies in the Department of Cinematic Arts at the University of Miami, where she served as Department Chair from 2015 to 2021. From 2020 to 2022, she was president of the University Film and Video Association.

== Early life ==
Lane spent her early life in Lexington, Virginia, where her father was a dean of students at Washington and Lee University and her mother launched an artist cooperative. In Lexington, she was often babysat by budding photographer Sally Mann, who would become renowned for her experimental photographs of local, rural landscapes and children. Lane later moved to Silver Spring, Maryland.

== Education ==
Lane earned a BA from Mount Holyoke College and an MA in Women's Studies from The Ohio State University. She received a doctorate in critical and cultural theory from the Radio-TV-Film Department at the University of Texas at Austin in 1999.

== Career ==
Lane's interest in media and gender initially developed through mentoring relationships at The Ohio State University, where she was a research assistant for film theorists Laura Mulvey and Judith Mayne. This foundation in feminist textual analysis led to her formulation of what she has called the "theory gap" that often excludes women's professional experiences from scholarly work. Her first book was Feminist Hollywood: From Born in Flames to Point, which examined the work of such women directors as Kathryn Bigelow, Martha Coolidge, and Darnell Martin, who entered commercial cinema from the realm of independent filmmaking. Upon its publication in 2000, B. Ruby Rich observed, "At long last, here's an informative volume that pays attention to women as participants in a heavily regulated industry, not just as images on a screen."

Lane is known for interdisciplinary research that adeptly incorporates a range of approaches, including cultural theory, industry studies, genre, historiography, and textual analysis. Her monograph, Magnolia, was the first book-length analysis of the Paul Thomas Anderson film.

Lane's later work takes a more biographical and historical turn, reclaiming and theorizing the past work of women in media industries. She is a leading expert on the female collaborators who worked with director Alfred Hitchcock. Her third book Phantom Lady: Hollywood Producer Joan Harrison, the Forgotten Woman Behind Hitchcock chronicles the life and career of Joan Harrison, who began as Alfred Hitchcock's assistant and became a respected powerhouse film producer in the 1940s. In addition to the 2021 Edgar Award, Phantom Lady won the 2020 Agatha Award for Best Nonfiction, making it only the third nonfiction book to claim both awards. It was named one of the Best Arts Books of 2020 by Library Journal.

== Contributions and appearances ==
Lane has contributed essays to outlets including the Air Mail, Ms., and CrimeReads. In March 2020, she appeared as a featured speaker for a two-week series on The Women Behind Hitchcock at the Film Forum in New York City. She appears in the 2021 documentary film I Am Alfred Hitchcock and provides commentary for the digital restoration of the Joan Harrison-produced Circle of Danger (1950) released on Blu-ray by StudioCanal in 2024. Lane appeared as a special guest on the Noir Alley series with Eddie Muller on the Turner Classic Movies network in 2020 and 2021.

== Selected works ==
- Lane, Christina (2000). Feminist Hollywood: From Born in Flames to Point Break. Wayne State University Press. ISBN 978-0814329221.
- Lane, Christina (2010). Magnolia (Studies in Film and Television). Wiley-Blackwell. ISBN 978-1405184625.
- Lane, Christina (2020). Phantom Lady: Hollywood Producer Joan Harrison, the Forgotten Woman Behind Hitchcock. Chicago Review Press. ISBN 978-1613733844.
