= Lizzie Borden (director) =

American filmmaker

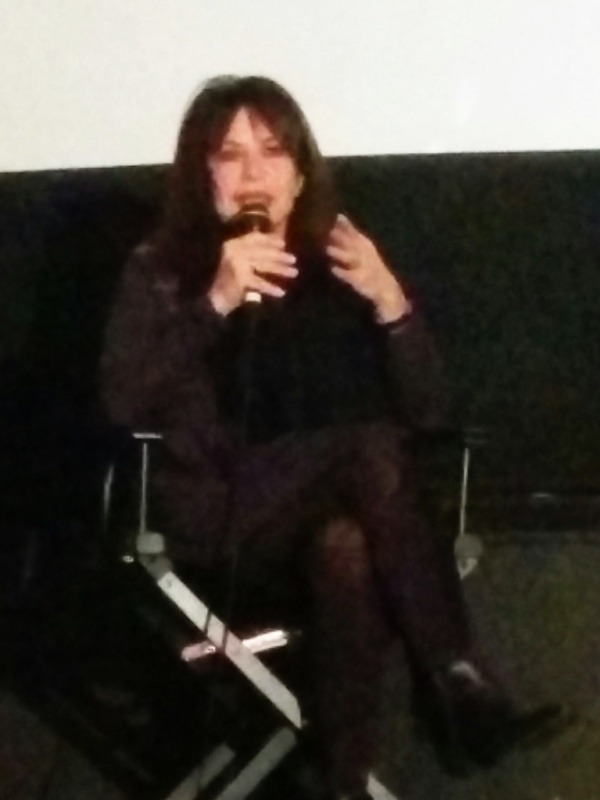
- Lizzie Borden in 2019
- Born: Linda Elizabeth Borden; February 3, 1958 (age 68); Detroit, Michigan, United States
- Occupation: Film director
- Years active: 1976–present

Lizzie Borden (born Linda Elizabeth Borden in 1950; some sources say 1958) is an American filmmaker, best known for her early independent films Born in Flames (1983) and Working Girls (1986).

== Early life and career ==
The daughter of a Detroit stockbroker, she was originally named Linda Elizabeth Borden. At the age of eleven she decided to take the name of the infamous accused double murderer Lizzie Borden, the inspiration for the children's rhyme, "Lizzie Borden took an axe/And gave her father forty whacks,/When she saw what she had done,/She gave her mother forty-one." Of her announcement to her parents that she was legally changing her name, Borden says, "At the time, my name was the best rebellion I could make."

Borden majored in fine arts at Wellesley College in Massachusetts before moving to New York City, and began her career as a writer, art critic (with several articles and reviews for Artforum from 1972 to 1974) and painter. After attending a retrospective of the films of Jean-Luc Godard, she was inspired to become a filmmaker and to experiment with cinema, favoring a "naive" approach to film production.

Borden made an experimental documentary film in 1976, Regrouping, which chronicled the fracturing of a women's collective. The film's portrait of four women artists incorporated avant-garde techniques borrowed from performance art, including a meta-analysis of the role of film itself in the fracturing of the collective that the film portrayed.

== Independent film career ==
Borden's films have been said to be united by an "iconoclastic depiction of sex"—notably, she controversially portrayed prostitution as an "economic choice" in her 1986 film Working Girls. Her body of work also investigates race, class, power, capitalism, and the power that money bestows—all from a feminist viewpoint.

Borden's first feature, Born in Flames, was shot and edited over five years with a budget of $30,000, and completed in 1983. Set in a near-future New York City, the film explores the role media plays in culture. What began as a project about white feminist responses to an oppressive government evolved into a story about women of color, lesbians, and white women of various classes mobilizing into collective action. The film concerned the racial, class, and political conflicts in a future United States socialist democracy. The film is named for a song written by Mayo Thompson of the Red Krayola, a member of the artists' group Art & Language. Borden used nonprofessional actors and the film was produced in a gritty, pseudo-documentary style. One reviewer noted that it pieces together a "disjunctive collage of women's individual and collective work." Born in Flames premiered at the Berlin Film Festival and has won several awards. It was named one of "The Most Important 50 Independent Films" by Filmmaker magazine and has been the subject of extensive feminist analysis, including that of Teresa de Lauretis.

Borden's next film, Working Girls, depicted the lives of sex workers and maintains some of the stylistic and thematic features of her debut, but is more mainstream in its approach. The film was inspired by some of the women who participated in the making of Born in Flames, who coincidentally supported themselves through prostitution. Although Working Girls addresses the subject of prostitution in great detail, Borden prefers the film to be discussed as a narrative fiction film rather than as a documentary. The film was intended to be a "backstage" look at prostitution. In a New York Times review, Vincent Canby writes, "Working Girls, though a work of fiction, sounds as authentic as might a documentary about coal miners." The film portrays prostitution as an often tedious, sometimes depressing, occasionally interesting or funny job. The main character, Molly (portrayed by Louise Smith), claims to have a degree from Yale and is a lesbian in her private life.

Borden wrote, directed and produced the film, which premiered in May 1986 at the 39th Cannes Film Festival after being selected for the Directors' Fortnight. The following January, the film debuted at the 1987 Sundance Film Festival where it won a Special Jury Prize and was picked up for distribution by Miramax Films.

== Hollywood film career ==
Miramax gave Borden a budget of $6 million and a script for Love Crimes, her first Hollywood feature (and her first film based on another writer's script). It was intended as an erotic thriller, but Borden envisioned it as centered more on a woman's genuine sexual feelings. The original script by Allan Moyle was rewritten by Laurie Frank, a female screenwriter specifically requested by Borden. The film starred Sean Young and Patrick Bergin.

Love Crimes was subjected to much studio interference and it fell victim to Hollywood attitudes regarding sex on screen in the 1990s; as a result, it lacked the taboo representations she had previously been able to show in her work. Numerous scenes were removed and some never shot, in the studio's attempts to present what they termed an "acceptable" vision of the lead's sexuality to a mass audience. While Borden found herself in the position to direct a mainstream production, she said her power over the film's content was disrupted by (as she put it) "everyone else's psyches ... with their fetishes, and what they don't like." The studio took away much of Borden's control over the final product and even went so far as to cut out the original ending that Borden had shot, substituting its own. "I went to movie jail after I did this awful movie, Love Crimes. I should have taken my name off it, but I was bullied into not taking my name off it. There are things in it that I didn't shoot. It's just not my movie, really."

Love Crimes was released in theaters on January 24, 1992, and quickly tanked – it was pulled from release after three weeks due to poor box office. It recouped less than half of its budget. For its VHS release, Borden negotiated the restoration of several scenes originally cut from the theatrical release. As a result, two versions of the film were released on video in July 1992: the original 84-minute theatrical version and a second, "unrated" version at 91 minutes. "The problems really came down to sex," Borden said. "My vision of what I wanted, of how I wanted to explore the character (played by Sean Young) and her sexual needs and desires just wasn't acceptable or accepted. The sadomasochistic element of the film as I envisioned it was too scary for the people writing the checks. And then I didn't get the final cut." The VHS release of the film's unrated version became a fast seller and it remains a cult favorite and highly collectible. In 2018, Borden disowned the "director's cut" label as a misnomer, and a marketing ploy by the studio and Harvey Weinstein, who she later said "threatened to destroy my career."

After the critical and box office failure of Love Crimes, Borden suspected that Weinstein branded her as "difficult." As a result, she ran into difficulty setting up further film projects. She ventured into television with mixed results, and worked with such cult stars as Mary Woronov, Alexis Arquette and Joe Dallesandro in a series Propaganda Films had created for Playboy TV (other directors in the series included Bernard Rose and Alexander Payne.) She subsequently directed episodes of Red Shoe Diaries, The Secret World of Alex Mack and other television productions, as well as directing local theater in Hollywood with the Grace Players, a theater troupe led by Natalija Nogulich.

Borden was one of four directors involved in the 1995 sex-vignette anthology film Erotique; and she cast a not-yet-famous Bryan Cranston for her segment.

In 1999, Borden was able to pitch to investors a filmed version of August Strindberg's 1888 play Miss Julie and was in pre-production when director Mike Figgis announced his own version in the trades, and her bank financing collapsed.

In 2001, Borden flew to New York City for final script discussions with actress Susan Sarandon for her next film project, Rialto. She and her partners arrived on the morning of 9/11, just in time to witness the World Trade Center collapse. Sarandon immediately joined the relief effort at Ground Zero and the project was put on hold.

Since the mid-2000s, Borden has been working as a script doctor in Los Angeles, writing scripts for other directors including one about reggae singer Bob Marley's relationship with mobster Danny Sims (based on Rita Marley's autobiography No Woman No Cry). That project was called Rebels and was announced in 2015 as part of slate of projects by Golden Island Filmworks to begin shooting in 2016. She has worked on some pilots for Fox Television, wrote a play about singer Nina Simone, and continues to solicit financing for her independent projects.

== Writing ==
Her other works in progress have included editing a book of stories by strippers, Honey On A Razor, and collaborating on a series about strippers with Antonia Crane, author of the memoir Spent. On December 6, 2022, Seven Stories Press published an anthology of stories by strippers Borden edited over a period of twenty years, Whorephobia, reviewed in Publishers Weekly as "a humane, multidimensional portrait of an industry typically shrouded in artifice and shame."

== Legacy ==
In February 2016, Anthology Film Archives hosted a week-long revival run of Born in Flames to premiere Anthology's new 35mm restoration of the work, funded by The Film Foundation and the Hollywood Foreign Press Association. The restoration was part of a larger multi-year project, "Re-Visions: American Experimental Film 1975–1990," supported by The Andy Warhol Foundation for the Visual Arts. To commemorate the re-release, The New Yorker remarked, "the free, ardent, spontaneous creativity of 'Born in Flames' emerges as an indispensable mode of radical change — one that many contemporary filmmakers with political intentions have yet to assimilate."

The restored and remastered 35mm print of Born In Flames that debuted at the Anthology Film Archives in February 2016 enjoyed something of a second life, traveling to the Walker Art Center, the Toronto Film Festival, the 2017 London Film Festival, the Edinburgh Film Festival and the Seoul International Women's Film Festival; as well as screening in Brussels, Barcelona, Madrid, and San Sebastian; and in many US cities including Detroit, Rochester, San Francisco and New Orleans. Her first film, Regrouping, was also shown at the screenings in Spain and in Brussels, and at the Edinburgh Film Festival, where it first played.

Born In Flames was featured at the fourth annual Final Girls Berlin film festival in 2019; the festival features horror by women directors and presented Borden's dystopian film as part of a sci-fi showcase. The film was also broadcast on Turner Classic Movies on the night of November 3, 2020, along with Borden's commentary on her film and on several other films featured in Mark Cousins' documentary, Women Make Film. The Bronx Museum of the Arts featured Born in Flames as the title piece of an exhibition about feminism and futurity from April to September 2021.

Borden's early films continue to be shown singly and in retrospectives at film festivals, repertory cinemas and art venues worldwide. Regrouping was restored by The Anthology Film Archives for a 2021 release and is part of Borden's early catalog acquired by Criterion. The Criterion Channel has shown Born In Flames and an interview with Borden; and The Criterion Collection restored and released Working Girls on DVD and Blu-Ray in 2021.

On the fate of her Hollywood films, Borden has said, "Born in Flames and Working Girls are the only two films I consider my own. The others – especially Love Crimes and Erotique – were so radically re-cut and interfered with by producers, they're not 'mine', in any sense of the word." (Flashbacks by L. M. "Kit" Carson were added to Love Crimes, and Borden was threatened against taking her name off the film. The producer of Erotique re-edited the film and laid on a music track, among other changes.) "I would like to make films the way I used to in New York, if that is possible. If I am able to make Rialto in ten years – or twenty – I hope it will still be relevant. I don't need to make a lot of films, I just need to believe in the ones I make. I would prefer to remain silent in the sense of the Susan Sontag essay ("The Aesthetics of Silence") until I am able to make something I believe in. And the issues I believe in – social issues, feminist issues, radical issues – are difficult to finance, even independently."

In 2021, Borden was invited to become a member of the Academy of Motion Picture Arts and Sciences.

== Personal life ==
Borden has stated she is bisexual.

== Filmography ==
=== Film ===
Year	Title	Director	Writer	Producer	Editor	Notes
1976	Regrouping	Yes	No	Yes	Yes	Documentary
1983	Born in Flames	Yes	Uncredited	Yes	Yes	Also additional camera operator
1986	Working Girls	Yes	Yes	Yes	Yes	
1991	Inside Out	Yes	Yes	No	No	Segments: "The Diaries", "Shrink Rap"
1992	Love Crimes	Yes	No	Yes	No	
1994	Erotique	Yes	Yes	No	No	Segment: "Let's Talk About Love"

=== Television ===
Year	Title	Director	Writer	Notes
1989	Monsters	Yes	No	Episode: "La Strega"
1996	Silk Stalkings	Yes	No	Episode: "Pre-Judgment Day"
1996	The Secret World of Alex Mack	Yes	No	Episode: "Bad Girl"
1996	Red Shoe Diaries	Yes	Yes	Episode: "Juarez"

== Awards and nominations ==
Year	Film	Award / Nomination	Result
1983	Born in Flames	Berlin International Film Festival Reader Jury of the "Zitty"	Won
1983	Born in Flames	Créteil International Women's Film Festival Grand Prix	Won
1987	Working Girls	Sundance Film Festival Special Jury Prize	Won
1987	Working Girls	Sundance Film Festival Grand Jury Prize	Nominated

== See also ==
- List of female film and television directors
- List of LGBT-related films directed by women
