= Pegadapalli =

Pegadapalli or Pegadapalle is a village in Kalva Srirampur Mandal in Peddapalli District of the Indian state of Telangana. It belongs to the Telangana region.

== Demographics ==
As of 2011 census, Pegadapalle had a population of 1,359. The total population constitute, 663 males and 696 females —a sex ratio of 1,050 females per 1000 males. 137 children are in the age group of 0–6 years. The average literacy rate stands at 60.56% with 740 literates.

== Power station ==
Pegadapalli (Adilabad or Jaipur) power station is an 1,800-megawatt (MW) coal-fired power plant under development in Telangana.
