= John Hanson (director) =

American movie director and cinematographer

John Hanson is an American movie director and cinematographer.

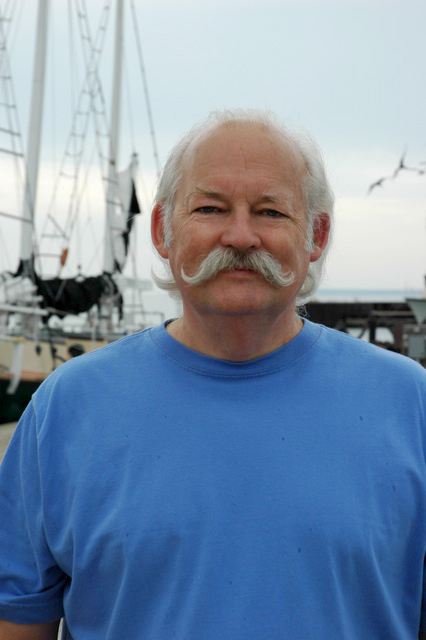
John Hanson, director and cinematographer.

== Early life ==
Born in St. Paul, Minnesota in 1942 and raised in McClusky, North Dakota, Hanson graduated from Phillips Exeter Academy, received his B.A. from Carleton College, and did postgraduate studies in architecture at the Harvard Graduate School of Design.

== Career ==
He began his career in film, going on to direct the motion pictures Northern Lights, Wildrose, and Shimmer, and numerous film, video and television documentaries. He co-founded the distribution company First Run Features. His films have been shown at film festivals around the world, including Venice, Berlin, London, Toronto, New York, Chicago, Sundance and Cannes, where Northern Lights won the Caméra d'Or award at the Cannes Film Festival for Best First Feature of 1979. In addition to many other film awards, he received the Distinguished Achievement Award from Carleton College and an Honorary Doctorate of Humane Letters from Northland College. He is past chair and current board member of the Wisconsin Humanities Council. He was a founding member of Cine Manifest, a seminal independent film collective in San Francisco and the Independent Feature Project. He lives in Bayfield, Wisconsin.

== Works ==
=== Books ===
Below the Sky: Photographs of the High Plains

The High Plains—the Dakotas, Montana, southern Saskatchewan—lie under a vast sky. Weather and wind throw cloud shadows across the landscape, a moving panorama of light, color and form. Earth meets sky at an incredibly distant horizon. Transcendent images materialize, drift away, reappear as the light shifts through the heavens. These remarkable photographs, taken over a span of 30 years, capture the magical moods and textures of a sublime, singular landscape—a rare retrospective of images taken by Hanson as he rambled the back roads of the plains below the sky. With an introduction by Minnesota writer Patricia Hampl and a foreword by Hanson.

=== Film ===
Year	Title	Director	Writer	Producer	Editor	Actor	Notes
1971	Secrets	No	No	Yes	No	No	
1976	Baker's Hawk	No	No	No	Yes	No	As John Stag Hanson
1978	Northern Lights	Yes	Yes	Yes	Yes	No	
1984	Wildrose	Yes	Yes	No	No	No	Screenplay/story
1987	Heat and Sunlight	No	No	No	No	Yes	
1988	Traveling Light	Yes	No	No	No	No	
1993	Shimmer	Yes	No	No	No	No	
2006	Cine Manifest (documentary)	No	No	No	No	Yes	As himself

=== Appearances ===
- Michael Feldman's Whad'Ya Know?, July 9, 2011
