= Billy Weber =

American film editor

- Occupations: Film editor; film director
- Years active: 1973–present

Billy Weber is an American film editor with several film credits dating from Days of Heaven (1978).

One of Weber's first editing roles was as associate editor (as William Weber) on Terrence Malick's first feature as a director, Badlands (1973). Badlands was edited by Robert Estrin; Weber edited Malick's next film Days of Heaven (1978). When Malick returned to film directing twenty years later with The Thin Red Line (1998), he once again hired Weber, along with Leslie Jones and Saar Klein, to edit it. While Weber did not edit Malick's next film, The New World, he was an associate producer on the project. Most recently, Weber was one of five collaborating editors on Malick's fifth feature, The Tree of Life (2011).

Beyond this notable collaboration with Malick, Weber has edited Beverly Hills Cop (directed by Martin Brest, 1984), Pee-wee's Big Adventure (Tim Burton, 1985), Top Gun (Tony Scott, 1986) and Midnight Run (Brest, 1988).

Weber was nominated for the Academy Award for Best Film Editing for Top Gun; he was nominated again for an Academy Award, an ACE Eddie Award and the Satellite Award, for The Thin Red Line. Days of Heaven was listed as the 45th best-edited film of all time in a survey of the membership of the Motion Picture Editors Guild.

Weber has directed one film, Josh and S.A.M. (1993), that was produced by Martin Brest.

== Filmography ==
Editor
| Year | Film | Director | Notes | Other notes |
|---|---|---|---|---|
| 1973 | Badlands | Terrence Malick | First collaboration with Terrence Malick | Uncredited |
| 1978 | Days of Heaven | Terrence Malick | Second collaboration with Terrence Malick | |
| 1979 | The Warriors | Walter Hill | First collaboration with Walter Hill | |
| 1981 | The House of God | Donald Wrye | | |
| 1982 | Jekyll and Hyde... Together Again | Jerry Belson | | |
| 1982 | 48 Hrs. | Walter Hill | Second collaboration with Walter Hill | |
| 1984 | Iceman | Fred Schepisi | | |
| 1984 | Beverly Hills Cop | Martin Brest | First collaboration with Martin Brest | |
| 1985 | Pee-wee's Big Adventure | Tim Burton | First collaboration with Tim Burton | |
| 1986 | Top Gun | Tony Scott | First collaboration with Tony Scott | |
| 1987 | Extreme Prejudice | Walter Hill | Third collaboration with Walter Hill | |
| 1987 | Beverly Hills Cop II | Tony Scott | Second collaboration with Tony Scott | |
| 1988 | Midnight Run | Martin Brest | Second collaboration with Martin Brest | |
| 1989 | The Package | Andrew Davis | | |
| 1990 | Days of Thunder | Tony Scott | Third collaboration with Tony Scott | |
| 1991 | Pure Luck | Nadia Tass | | |
| 1995 | Grumpier Old Men | Howard Deutch | | |
| 1997 | Murder at 1600 | Dwight H. Little | | |
| 1998 | Bulworth | Warren Beatty | First collaboration with Warren Beatty | |
| 1998 | The Thin Red Line | Terrence Malick | Third collaboration with Terrence Malick | |
| 2000 | Miss Congeniality | Donald Petrie | | |
| 2002 | Showtime | Tom Dey | Second collaboration with Tom Dey | |
| 2003 | Gigli | Martin Brest | Third collaboration with Martin Brest | |
| 2006 | Nacho Libre | Jared Hess | | |
| 2006 | Barnyard | Steve Oedekerk | | |
| 2008 | The Love Guru | Marco Schnabel | | |
| 2010 | Passion Play | Mitch Glazer | | |
| 2011 | The Tree of Life | Terrence Malick | Fifth collaboration with Terrence Malick | |
| 2016 | Jack Reacher: Never Go Back | Edward Zwick | | |
| 2016 | Rules Don't Apply | Warren Beatty | Second collaboration with Warren Beatty | |
| 2018 | The Predator | Shane Black | | |
| 2019 | American Skin | Nate Parker | | |
| 2022 | Rise of the Teenage Mutant Ninja Turtles: The Movie | Andy Suriano; Ant Ward | | |
| 2024 | Saving Bikini Bottom: The Sandy Cheeks Movie | Liza Johnson | | |

Editorial department
| Year | Film | Director | Role | Notes |
|---|---|---|---|---|
| 1973 | Badlands | Terrence Malick | Associate editor | |
| 1973 | Messiah of Evil | Willard Huyck; Gloria Katz | Associate editor | First collaboration with Willard Huyck |
| 1976 | Taxi Driver | Martin Scorsese | Assistant editor | |
| 1984 | Best Defense | Willard Huyck | Additional editor | Second collaboration with Willard Huyck |
| 2000 | Shanghai Noon | Tom Dey | Additional editor | First collaboration with Tom Dey |

Actor
| Year | Film | Director | Role | Notes |
|---|---|---|---|---|
| 1973 | Messiah of Evil | Willard Huyck; Gloria Katz | Supermarket Zombie | Uncredited |

Director
| Year | Film |
|---|---|
| 1993 | Josh and S.A.M. |

Producer
| Year | Film | Director | Credit | |
|---|---|---|---|---|
| 2005 | The New World | Terrence Malick | Associate producer | Fourth collaboration with Terrence Malick |

Second unit director or assistant director
| Year | Film | Director | Role | Notes |
|---|---|---|---|---|
| 1992 | Batman Returns | Tim Burton | Second unit director | Second collaboration with Tim Burton |

Soundtrack
| Year | Film | Director | Role |
|---|---|---|---|
| 1947 | Song of the Wasteland | Thomas Carr | Writer: "Somebody's Rose" |

Thanks
| Year | Film | Director | Role |
|---|---|---|---|
| 1995 | Virtuosity | Brett Leonard | Special thanks |
| 2000 | Gun Shy | Eric Blakeney | Special thanks |
| 2003 | Shanghai Knights | David Dobkin | Special thanks |
| 2004 | The Clearing | Pieter Jan Brugge | Special thanks |
| 2004 | The SpongeBob SquarePants Movie | Stephen Hillenburg | Special thanks |
| 2005 | The Hitchhiker's Guide to the Galaxy | Garth Jennings | Thanks |
