= Stephen M. Katz (cinematographer) =

American cinematographer

- Born: Stephen Marshall Katz; August 10, 1946 (age 80); Los Angeles, California, U.S.
- Occupation: Cinematographer

Stephen Marshall Katz (born August 10, 1946) is an American cinematographer. He served as the cinematographer for the 1980 film The Blues Brothers.

== Biography ==
Katz was born in Los Angeles in 1946; his older sister was film producer Gloria Katz. He attended the California Institute of the Arts and ArtCenter College of Design, where he studied design and photography.

He originally made plans to open a photo studio in New York City, but in 1970, he was approached by New World Pictures to be the director of photography for Angels Hard as They Come, which he accepted. From there, Katz worked on several low-budget projects throughout the 1970s, including Messiah of Evil, which was directed by his sister and brother-in-law Willard Huyck.

Some of Katz's notable films include The Kentucky Fried Movie, The Blues Brothers, Gods and Monsters, Baby Geniuses, and I'll Always Know What You Did Last Summer.

== Personal life ==
Katz is gay. His lover Ron Bechard had recommended that Katz shoot Gods and Monsters, but died before the project began. The film is dedicated to Bechard's memory.

== Selected filmography ==
- Angels Hard as They Come (1971)
- Your Three Minutes Are Up (1973)
- Messiah of Evil (1973)
- The Student Teachers (1973)
- Dirty O'Neil (1974)
- Switchblade Sisters (1975)
- Best Friends (1975)
- Las Vegas Lady (1975)
- The Four Deuces (1975)
- The Pom Pom Girls (1976)
- Bittersweet Love (1976)
- Joyride (1977)
- The Kentucky Fried Movie (1977)
- Our Winning Season (1978)
- The Little Dragons (1979)
- The Blues Brothers (1980)
- Last Resort (1986)
- 'night, Mother (1986)
- Nice Girls Don't Explode (1987)
- Sister, Sister (1987)
- And God Created Woman (1988)
- 18 Again! (1988)
- Who's Harry Crumb? (1989)
- Backstreet Dreams (1990)
- White Lie (1991)
- Watch It (1993)
- Arthur Miller's The American Clock (1993)
- My Summer Story (1994)
- Timemaster (1995)
- Gods and Monsters (1998)
- Baby Geniuses (1999)
- I'll Remember April (1999)
- Geppetto (2000)
- Her Majesty (2001)
- The Dust Factory (2004)
- I'll Always Know What You Did Last Summer (2006)
