= 1973 National Society of Film Critics Awards =

Annual US film award ceremony

8th NSFC Awards

January 4, 1974

Best Film:
Day for Night

The 8th National Society of Film Critics Awards honored the best filmmaking of 1973. Voting by nineteen members of the society took place on 2 January 1974 and winners announced that day. Citations were presented to the winners in a ceremony on 20 January 1974. Both the voting and the ceremony occurred at the Algonquin Hotel in Midtown Manhattan.

== Winners ==
=== Best Picture ===
- Day for Night (La nuit américaine)

=== Best Director ===
- François Truffaut – Day for Night (La nuit américaine)

=== Best Actor ===
- Marlon Brando – Last Tango in Paris (Ultimo tango a Parigi)

=== Best Actress ===
- Liv Ullmann – The New Land (Nybyggarna)

=== Best Supporting Actor ===
- Robert De Niro – Mean Streets

=== Best Supporting Actress ===
- Valentina Cortese – Day for Night (La nuit américaine)

=== Best Screenplay ===
- George Lucas, Gloria Katz and Willard Huyck – American Graffiti

=== Best Cinematography ===
- Vilmos Zsigmond – The Long Goodbye

=== Special awards ===
- Tomás Gutiérrez Alea – Memories of Underdevelopment (Memorias del subdesarrollo)
- Daryl Duke
- Robert Ryan – The Iceman Cometh
