= Messiah of Evil =

1974 film by Gloria Katz and Willard Huyck

- Theatrical release poster
- Directed by: Gloria Katz; Willard Huyck
- Written by: Gloria Katz; Willard Huyck
- Produced by: Gloria Katz; Willard Huyck
- Starring: Michael Greer; Marianna Hill; Joy Bang; Anitra Ford; Royal Dano; Elisha Cook Jr.
- Cinematography: Stephen Katz
- Edited by: Scott Conrad
- Music by: Phillan Bishop
- Production company: V/M Productions
- Distributed by: International Cine Film Corp.
- Release dates: December 13, 1974 (Paris, Texas)
- Running time: 90 minutes
- Country: United States
- Language: English
- Budget: < $1 million

Messiah of Evil is a 1974 American supernatural horror film written, produced, and directed by Gloria Katz and Willard Huyck. It stars Michael Greer, Marianna Hill, Joy Bang, Anitra Ford, Royal Dano, and Elisha Cook Jr. Its plot follows Arletty Lang, a woman who travels to a remote coastal town in California to find her missing artist father Joseph; upon arrival, she finds herself in the midst of a series of bizarre incidents.

Shot in 1971 but not premiered until December 1974, the film was released throughout 1975 under several titles, such as Return of the Living Dead, Revenge of the Screaming Dead, Night of the Damned and Dead People. Largely overlooked upon initial release, the film later developed a cult following and underwent a critical reappraisal, with praise directed towards its surrealist, dreamlike tone and elliptical plot.

Husband-and-wife team Huyck and Katz went on to direct and write Howard the Duck. The duo had previously co-written American Graffiti and later wrote Indiana Jones and the Temple of Doom.

== Plot ==
Arletty Lang drives to the small coastal town of Point Dune to visit her estranged father Joseph, an artist. She finds his beach house abandoned and discovers a diary in which he detailed his disturbing nightmares as well as strange occurrences in the town. The next day, an art dealer informs Arletty that three strangers staying at a local motel are looking for her father. In the strangers' motel room, Arletty finds a well-dressed couple, Thom and Laura, and their companion Toni interviewing Charlie, a homeless man who explains that 100 years earlier, the townspeople descended into cannibalism once the moon turned red.

Outside the motel, Charlie privately urges Arletty to kill her father, insisting that she must burn him instead of burying him. The next morning, Arletty awakens to find Thom, Laura, and Toni at Joseph's house. Thom explains that they were evicted from their motel after Charlie's body was found half-eaten in an alley, presumably by dogs. Arletty reluctantly lets them stay. Thom, a collector of old legends, thought Joseph might know something of the legend of Point Dune. Meanwhile, a group of people gather on the beach around bonfires and stare up at the moon every night.

After witnessing Thom flirting with Arletty, Laura leaves the house late one evening and walks into a local grocery store, where she is cornered and devoured by townspeople who are feasting on raw meat. The following day, the police inform Arletty that Joseph's body has been found on the beach, crushed under a large metal sculpture he was building. On the beach, she sees only the hand of a corpse sticking out from under the collapsed sculpture. Later, Arletty reads in Joseph's diary that his body temperature had dropped to 85 degrees and that he feared he was possessed. She tells Thom that the corpse on the beach is not her father.

That night, Toni goes to see a Western film and is devoured by the other theater patrons, who weep blood from their eyes. As Thom searches the town for Toni, he encounters a crowd of zombie-like townspeople. Two police officers arrive in a squad car and start shooting at the townspeople, but one officer notices his partner bleeding from his eye and shoots him. Undaunted, the undead officer shoots his former partner dead, and he and the other townspeople feast on his flesh.

While alone in the house, Arletty finds a spider in her mouth and vomits a lizard, cockroaches, and maggots into the sink. She is later visited by Joseph, who begs her to leave and tell the world about Point Dune. He tells her about the "dark stranger", a survivor of the Donner Party who founded a cannibalistic cult 100 years earlier. He ultimately walked into the ocean, promising to return in a century. Joseph warns Arletty that the dark stranger must be destroyed before the moon turns red and he returns to lead his people up the coast and inland. Joseph then attacks Arletty, reluctantly succumbing to his cannibalistic urges, whereupon she stabs him with garden shears and burns him alive.

When Thom returns to the house in the morning, Arletty stabs him in the arm with the shears before realizing he is not a cannibal. As the two flee to the beach, the townspeople follow them. Arletty and Thom swim out into the waves, hoping to reach a small boat, but he drowns. The townspeople capture Arletty and place her on the beach as an offering to the dark stranger, who emerges from the ocean and frees her, knowing that no one will believe her story. Arletty is eventually committed to an insane asylum, where by day she paints in the sun and by night wanders the halls and futilely tries to warn the others about the dark stranger and his followers.

== Cast ==
- Michael Greer as Thom
- Marianna Hill as Arletty Lang
- Joy Bang as Toni
- Anitra Ford as Laura
- Royal Dano as Joseph Lang
- Elisha Cook Jr. as Charlie
- Charles Dierkop as gas attendant
- Bennie Robinson as albino trucker
- Walter Hill as victim in prologue

== Production ==
The working title of the film was The Second Coming. Jack Fisk (credited as "Jack Fiske") was the film's art director. Principal photography began on September 1, 1971.

Due to the film's low budget, several roles were played by filmmaker friends of Gloria Katz and Willard Huyck. Walter Hill plays the victim in the opening sequence, Billy Weber appears as a zombie in the supermarket sequence (in addition to being one of the film's editors), and Bill L. Norton appears in a bit part.

In a 2011 blog post, Anitra Ford claimed the film's oblique plot was partly due to financial issues that left principal photography incomplete. She wrote "toward the end of the filming, investors pulled their money out, and the film was never finished. A Frenchman bought the unedited footage, edited it and released the movie under the title of Messiah of Evil." Huyck and Katz have given conflicting reports about the film's production: Huyck claims principal photography finished as planned, while Katz claimed two scenes (including the climax) were left unfinished. Critic Gabe Powers referred to the film as "by most accounts, an incomplete movie."

== Analysis ==
Katz later said the film "was a real bowwow," though Huyck claimed in 1984 that "it appeared on a marquee in a Woody Allen film [Annie Hall], and Film Comment called it 'one of the top 10 classic, overlooked horror films of all time.'"

Kim Newman considers the film to be a "neglected" and "surreal" horror film, which has both a convoluted narrative and a peculiar atmosphere. He draws attention to details such as the vanished father being a death-obsessed painter, the daughter falling in with a group of hedonists, the town people turning into ghouls. He also notes that the "dark stranger" was a sinister preacher, whose awaited return comes from the sea. He finds all these details point to the influence of H. P. Lovecraft on the film, while the depiction of the undead derives from their depiction in Night of the Living Dead. Newman assesses the "doomed derelict," whose apt warnings are ignored, as a cliché deriving from gothic fiction.

Ian Cooper comments that the undead of the film seem to be ghoul-like and zombie-like vampires. He states that there was a trend in this direction following the release of Night of the Living Dead (1968) and that Messiah was one of the films that followed it. He cites, among other examples, Let's Scare Jessica to Death (1971), The Return of Count Yorga (1971), Deathdream/Dead of Night (1972) and Lemora (1975).

According to author Glenn Kay, one of the key weaknesses of the film is that "important plot points are never clarified" and that the motivations of the lead characters are insufficiently explained. In particular, Thom is identified as a collector of old legends, but his motivations are even more obscure than those of his female companions Toni and Laura. Newman points out that the strange behavior of the seemingly normal characters adds to the surreal feeling of the film. The titular Messiah of Evil is never properly identified. Kay finds it problematic that no character reads Joseph Lang's diary to the end until it is too late to prevent their fate. It is unclear whether the character Thom is the "dark stranger" himself (Greer does in fact play the "dark stranger" in a flashback sequence), or a reincarnation, or a descendant. In an interview shortly before filming, Greer claimed his character was "the devil's son." A common theory is that key scenes clarifying this plot point were never filmed due to budgetary issues.

The process of transformation for the infected is depicted on screen, but this process is also never really explained. The film features a distinctive pattern of symptoms for the infected population of Point Dune. They start bleeding from their eyes while becoming insensitive to pain. They consume meat regardless of its source, including human flesh and a mouse. Once fully transformed, they "become mere shells of their former selves." They all eagerly await the return of the so-called "dark stranger," passing the time by lighting bonfires on the beach and gathering round them. When the long-awaited return occurs, they are sent to spread their disease to other areas of California.

When a victim is chased through a supermarket and devoured, the death is implied and not depicted. It seems to be a reference to consumerism similar to the satire of consumerism in Dawn of the Dead (1978). Newman finds the highlight of the film to be the scene set in the movie theater. Toni, the "nymphet" as he calls her, is watching a collage of scenes from the Western Gone with the West (1974). Meanwhile, the decayed theater is increasingly filled with undead people.

Brendan Riley notes that the zombie films of George A. Romero are known for their social criticism, but he believes that the same can be said of non-Romero films of the genre. He notes Messiah as an example. The undead hordes consist of strait-laced, suit-wearing people, while their targets include long-haired dandy Thom and his two lovers Toni and Laura.

Newman places the film within a specific era of horror film, which he names "the American Nightmare." He defines it as the era starting with Night of the Living Dead (1968) and ending with Dawn of the Dead (1978). He defines it as an era when writer-directors started their own film projects and then went in search of business partners and shady distributors. The films had commercial value, but the creators managed to express their personal concerns within the framework of the genre. He places Messiah among the one-off oddities produced in this era and notes that such oddities were regularly released alongside marketable hits that spawned sequels. Newman believes the era properly ended in the early 1980s, when formula-driven franchises such as Friday the 13th and A Nightmare on Elm Street started dominating the genre.

Matt Serafini of Dread Central identifies the film as an early example of "nightmare" films, meaning that it portrays many dream-like, psychedelic scenes in an eerie, ominous atmosphere.

== Release ==
The film's world premiere screenings were late shows held at the Cinema 1 & 2 in Paris, Texas, on December 13 and 14, 1974, and first opened in Los Angeles in April 1975.

It was released under several alternate titles in the following years, such as Return of the Living Dead, Revenge of the Screaming Dead and Night of the Damned. The film was involved in a dispute in the 1978 over its title, when a Chicago distributor released it under the title Return of the Living Dead. The title was chosen to make it sound as part of the Living Dead franchise and this was misleading. The Laurel Group (also known as Laurel Entertainment), founded in 1976 by George A. Romero and Richard P. Rubinstein, took legal action against this use of the title. Eventually the Motion Picture Association of America decided that Romero did not hold exclusive rights to the terms Living Dead, but ruled against the use of the misleading title for Messiah. It was re-released theatrically in 1980 with the title Dead People.

=== Home media ===
The film was released on DVD on October 27, 2009, fully remastered by Code Red DVD. A fortieth anniversary Blu-ray edition was released by Code Red in 2013. It had previous been released as a double feature DVD in 2003 paired with The Devil's Nightmare.

Radiance Films released a limited edition Blu-ray (followed by a standard edition) in October 2023 in both the United States and United Kingdom.

== Reception ==
=== Critical response ===
On the review aggregator website Rotten Tomatoes, 100% of 12 critics' reviews are positive. On Metacritic, the film has a weighted average score of 69 out of 100 based on 6 critics, which the site labels as "generally favorable" reviews.

Kevin Thomas of the Los Angeles Times dismissed the film as a "thoroughly dismal horror picture that is sleep-inducing rather than hair-raising."

Nick Spacek from Starburst Magazine rated the film a perfect score of 10 out of 10, calling it "unsettling," and praised the film's soundtrack and disturbing visuals. Ian Jane of DVD Talk gave the film four out of five stars, praising the film's atmosphere, performances, tension, and visual style, calling it "a high point in creativity for the independent American horror film movement of the 1970s." Gabe Powers of Genre Grinder wrote, "Despite and because of all of its production problems, Messiah of Evil is a uniquely frightening experience, dripping with dread, unexpectedly graphic violence, and unexplainably hypnotic artistry."

== Legacy ==
The film was listed at #95 on IndieWire's "The 100 Greatest Horror Movies of All-Time," with the film's entry stating, "While Messiah of Evil is lesser known, it’s full of iconic and memorable scenes that recall to mind some of George A. Romero’s best work."

== See also ==
- List of American films of 1974

== Sources ==
- Bouzereau, Laurent (1997). Star Wars: The Annotated Screenplays. New York: Del Rey. ISBN 0-345-40981-7.
- Cooper, Ian (2013), "Manson, Drugs Black Power: The Countercultural Vampire", in Hunt, Leon; Lockyer, Sharon; Williamson, Milly (eds.), Screening the Undead: Vampires and Zombies in Film and Television, I.B. Tauris, ISBN 978-1848859241
- Dendle, Peter (2001). "Messiah of Evil". The Zombie Movie Encyclopedia. McFarland & Company. ISBN 978-0-786-45520-1.
- Kay, Glenn (2008). "Messiah of Evil (1973)". Zombie Movies: The Ultimate Guide. Chicago Review Press. ISBN 978-1-569-76683-5.
- Newman, Kim (2011). Nightmare Movies: Horror on Screen Since the 1960s. Bloomsbury Publishing. ISBN 978-1-408-81750-6.
- Riley, Brendan (2011). Boluk, Stephanie; Lenz, Wylie (eds.). Generation Zombie: Essays on the Living Dead in Modern Culture. McFarland & Company. ISBN 978-0-786-46140-0.
- Verevis, Constantine (2010). "Redefining the Sequel: The Case of the (Living) Dead". In Jess-Cooke, Carolyn; Verevis, Constantine (eds.). Second Takes: Critical Approaches to the Film Sequel. State University of New York Press. ISBN 978-1-438-43031-7.
