= More American Graffiti =

1979 film by Bill L. Norton

- Theatrical release poster by William Stout
- Directed by: B.W.L. Norton
- Written by: B.W.L. Norton
- Based on: Characters by George Lucas; Gloria Katz; Willard Huyck
- Produced by: Howard Kazanjian
- Starring: Paul Le Mat; Cindy Williams; Candy Clark; Charles Martin Smith; Mackenzie Phillips; Bo Hopkins; Ron Howard
- Cinematography: Caleb Deschanel
- Edited by: Tina Hirsch
- Production company: Lucasfilm Ltd.
- Distributed by: Universal Pictures
- Release date: August 3, 1979
- Running time: 110 minutes
- Country: United States
- Language: English
- Budget: $2.5–3 million
- Box office: $8.1–15 million (US)

More American Graffiti is a 1979 American coming-of-age comedy film written and directed by Bill L. Norton, produced by Howard Kazanjian. The film, shot in multiple aspect ratios for comedic and dramatic emphasis, is the sequel to the 1973 film American Graffiti. While the first film followed a group of friends during the evening before they depart for college, the sequel depicts where they end up on consecutive New Years Eves from 1964 to 1967.

Most of the main cast members from the first film returned for the sequel, including Candy Clark, Ron Howard, Paul Le Mat, Cindy Williams, Mackenzie Phillips, Charles Martin Smith, Bo Hopkins and Harrison Ford. (Richard Dreyfuss was the only principal cast member from the original film not to appear in the sequel). It was the final live-action theatrical film in which Ron Howard would play a credited, named character.

== Plot ==
The film, set over the course of four consecutive New Year's Eves from 1964 to 1967, depicts scenes from each of these years, intertwined with one another as though events happen simultaneously. The audience is protected from confusion by the use of a distinct cinematic style for each section. For example, the 1966 sequences echo the film Woodstock using split screens and multiple angles of the same event simultaneously on screen, the 1965 sequences (set in Vietnam) shot hand-held on grainy super 16 mm film designed to resemble war reporters' footage. The film attempts to memorialize the 1960s with sequences that recreate the sense and style from those days, with references to Haight-Ashbury, the campus peace movement, the beginnings of the modern women's liberation movement and the accompanying social revolt. One character burns his draft card, showing a younger audience what so many Americans had done on the television news ten years before the film's release. Other characters are shown frantically disposing of their marijuana before a traffic stop as a police officer pulls them over, and another scene shows the police overreaction to an anti-Vietnam War protest.

The storylines and fates of the main characters include the following:

- New Year's Eve 1964: John Milner is a drag-strip racer and falls in love with Eva, an attractive young woman from Iceland who speaks no English. Regardless, Milner does his best to communicate with her. He is briefly visited at the drag strip by Steve Bolander, Laurie Henderson, Terry Fields, and Debbie Dunham, with Laurie pregnant and Terry in a military uniform, shipping out to Vietnam the same night. John also briefly reunites with Carol "Rainbow" Morrison, the girl he was goaded into driving around in the first movie. Epilogue: Milner wins the final competition of the season on New Year's Eve 1964. Later that night, he is shown driving his trademark yellow deuce coupe down a long, hilly road with another vehicle's headlights coming from the opposite direction. After disappearing over a small hill, neither Milner's taillights nor the approaching headlights are seen again. Milner, through a brief screen card, is identified as having been killed by a drunk driver. The anniversary of his death is mentioned in both the 1965 and 1966 sequences.
- New Year's Eve 1965: Terry "The Toad" Fields is in Vietnam and wants desperately to get out of the war and the abuse of his superiors, attempting to injure himself to accomplish his goal. His desperation escalates after Joe Young (the leader of The Pharaohs, the lowrider gang of the previous film) is shot and killed by an enemy sniper, after promising to make Fields a Pharaoh once they finally return home. Epilogue: Fields fakes his own death and deserts, heading for Europe. His superiors believe him to be dead in 1965, as do Debbie in 1966 and Steve and Laurie in 1967.
- New Year's Eve 1966: Free-spirited Debbie "Deb" Dunham has switched from Old Harper whisky to marijuana and has given up her platinum blonde persona for one as a hippie/groupie. She misses Terry, mentioning that they were planning to get married before he "died" in Vietnam. She is currently dating a hippie rock and roll musician, Lance Harris, and wants to get married, but he is not interested. At the beginning of the film's storyline, as they drive around San Francisco, they get pulled over by Bob Falfa, the drag racer from the first film. He has gone on to become an SFPD motorcycle patrolman and arrests Lance for possession of a marijuana joint. She bails Lance out, but he still isn't interested in marriage, and acts distant towards her. She then joins some musicians in the band Electric Haze, led by guitarist Newt, on a long, strange trip, running over garbage cans in the process. They end up playing in a country-and-western bar. Epilogue: Dancing at that bar, Debbie sees Lance romantically dancing with another woman, so she hits him in the face and dumps him, causing a bar fight to break out. She joins the Electric Haze on another trip to go watch the sunrise. She ultimately ends up getting a full-time gig as the lead singer of a country-and-western music group.
- New Year's Eve 1967: Steve Bolander and Laurie Henderson are now married with twin boys (it is implied they married because of Laurie's unplanned pregnancy), and living in the suburbs. Their relationship is strained by her insistence that she start her own career. Steve forbids it, saying he wants her only to be a mom to their boys. Way beyond the end of her rope, Laurie leaves Steve and goes to stay with her brother, Andy, who with his girlfriend Vicki Townsend, is participating in an anti-war protest on a college campus, and is unsympathetic about her concerns. However, as Andy goes to the protest, he leaves his wallet behind and calls, asking her to retrieve it and bring it to him. However, when she finds out that Andy is going to burn his draft card at the protest, she refuses to give it to him. Just as the campus is surrounded by the police, they attempt to leave. She criticizes Andy's anti-war protest stance, saying that if the war was ended, Terry would have "died" for nothing. As they evade the police, Steve arrives, they embrace and he agrees to let her work, albeit in a few years, causing another big argument between them. They are arrested by the police as the growing crowd of fleeing protesters and confusion engulfs them. Epilogue: As night falls, with Laurie, Vicki and all the female detainees being held in a police transport bus, Steve talks to her through the window-bars, agreeing to let her work if she wants, and they reconcile. However, as they attempt to convince the police that they are not demonstrators, a policeman hits the bus window-bars with a truncheon, barely missing Laurie's fingers. When Steve tries to intervene, the policeman hits him in the chest, sparking a riot among the protesters, and Steve and Andy escape, driving the police bus off campus. Steve, Laurie, Andy and Vicki watch the Times Square Ball drop on a TV in an appliance store window. Steve continues to work as an insurance agent and Laurie becomes head of a consumer group.

The final scenes show Steve, Laurie, Andy, and Vicki in front of the appliance store watching the TV, Debbie, Newt and the Electric Haze in the band's van, and Terry walking alone wearing civvies, now AWOL after faking his death. All of them are singing "Auld Lang Syne". Milner is in his deuce coupe at night on a hilly road while listening to the song play on the radio, driving toward his fatal encounter.

== Cast ==
- Paul Le Mat as John Milner
- Cindy Williams as Laurie Henderson-Bolander
- Candy Clark as Debbie Dunham
- Ron Howard as Steve Bolander
- Mackenzie Phillips as Carol "Rainbow" Morrison
- Charles Martin Smith as Terry "The Toad" Fields
- Bo Hopkins as Joe "Little Joe" Young
- Anna Bjorn as Eva
- Scott Glenn as Newt
- Mary Kay Place as Teensa
- Wolfman Jack as Himself
- Richard Bradford as Major Creech
- Harrison Ford as Officer Bob Falfa (uncredited)
- James Houghton as Sinclair
- Manuel Padilla Jr. as Carlos
- Will Seltzer as Andy Henderson
- Jonathan Gries as Ron
- John Lansing as Lance Harris
- Monica Tenner as "Moonflower"
- Carol-Ann Williams as Vikki Townsend
- Delroy Lindo as Army Sergeant
- Rosanna Arquette as Girl in Commune
- Naomi Judd as Girl on Bus
- Tom Baker as a Police Officer
- Steve Evans as Racetrack Announcer
- Wayne Coy as Safety Safari

== Production ==
After the success of the original film, George Lucas, who directed American Graffiti, felt that he should direct a sequel. However, his colleague Gary Kurtz and the film's producer Francis Ford Coppola declined to make a sequel since sequels were not as well received. Lucas shelved the sequel to work on Star Wars and Raiders of the Lost Ark. After the success of Star Wars, Universal City Studios president Sid Sheinberg felt that American Graffiti could have a sequel. Lucas was initially reluctant to do a sequel, but after discussions with producer Howard Kazanjian, he agreed to do so.

Lucas felt that he should not direct the film due to various circumstances, such as handling his company's financing, developing Radioland Murders with Willard Huyck and Gloria Katz, whom he had worked with on the film, and writing the screenplay of The Empire Strikes Back and planning his Indiana Jones franchise with fellow director Steven Spielberg. Finding a director was problematic for Lucas and Kazanjian. Kazanjian's top choice was John Landis, who declined to work on it. Lucas’ professor Irvin Kershner was also considered, but rejected the offer due to his lack of experience in comedy.

Lucas considered Robert Zemeckis, who had finished directing his first feature film I Wanna Hold Your Hand, but he turned down the offer. Bill L. Norton was picked by Lucas as being suitable due to his California upbringing and experience with comedy. Lucas and Kazanjian asked him to do a screenplay, which Norton quickly accepted. Lucas was involved in the production by acting as the executive producer, editing both Norton's screenplay and supervising the finished motion picture, and even setting up a camera for sequences set in the Vietnam War.

Wolfman Jack briefly reprises his role, but is only heard in voice-over. The drag racing scenes were filmed at the Fremont Raceway, later Baylands Raceway Park, now the site of multiple automobile dealerships in Fremont, California.

== Home media ==
The film was released on DVD in September 2003 and once more as a double feature teamed with American Graffiti (1973) in January 2004. It was later released on digital disc in 2011 and finally released on Blu-ray for Europe in May 2012 and for North America in June 2018.

== Soundtrack ==
The film also featured a 24-track soundtrack album featuring music from the film, along with the voice-over tracks by Wolfman Jack. That album is out of print and has never been released on CD.

Side one

1. "Heat Wave" – Martha and the Vandellas (2:42)
2. "Moon River" – Andy Williams (2:41)
3. "Mr. Tambourine Man" – The Byrds (2:18)
4. "My Boyfriend's Back" – The Angels (2:36)
5. "The Sound of Silence" – Simon & Garfunkel (3:07)
6. "Season of the Witch" – Donovan (4:58)

Side two

1. "Stop in the Name of Love" – The Supremes (2:47)
2. "Strange Brew" – Cream (2:45)
3. "Just Like a Woman" – Bob Dylan (4:50)
4. "Respect" – Aretha Franklin (2:25)
5. "She's Not There" – The Zombies (2:21)
6. "96 Tears" – ? and the Mysterians (3:01)

Side three

1. "Pipeline" – The Chantays (2:18)
2. "Since I Fell for You" – Lenny Welch (2:50)
3. "Beechwood 4-5789" – The Marvellettes (1:59)
4. "Mr. Lonely" – Bobby Vinton (2:39)
5. "Cool Jerk" – The Capitols (2:45)
6. "I Feel Like I’m Fixin’ to Die Rag" – Country Joe and the Fish (4:12)

Side four

1. "The Ballad of the Green Berets" – Barry Sadler (2:37)
2. "My Guy" – Mary Wells (2:45)
3. "I'm a Man" – Doug Sahm (2:35)
4. "Hang On Sloopy" – The McCoys (with Voice-overs by Wolfman Jack) (3:02)
5. "When a Man Loves a Woman" – Percy Sledge (2:50)
6. "Like a Rolling Stone" – Bob Dylan (6:06)

A fictional band named Electric Haze featuring Doug Sahm appears in the film, most notably performing the Bo Diddley song "I'm a Man".

An earlier album, also titled More American Graffiti, was an official album sequel to 41 Original Hits from the Soundtrack of American Graffiti, the first soundtrack to American Graffiti. The album (MCA 8007) was released in 1975, four years before the film sequel of the same name was released. While only one of the songs in this album was actually used in the 1973 motion picture, this collection was compiled and approved by George Lucas for commercial release. In 1976, MCA Records released a third and final Various Artists double album set titled: American Graffiti Vol. III (MCA 8008). Unlike the first two albums, American Graffiti Vol. III does not include dialogue with Wolfman Jack.

== Reception ==
=== Box office ===
More American Graffiti opened on August 3, 1979, the same weekend as Apocalypse Now and Monty Python's Life of Brian. The Numbers puts the gross at $8.1 million, and Box Office Mojo at $15 million. Despite its minor box office success, its gross was nowhere near as high as that of American Graffiti, even though Ron Howard, Cindy Williams and Harrison Ford were bigger stars (due to their major roles in the TV hits Happy Days and Laverne & Shirley and the film Star Wars) in 1979 than they had been in 1973.

=== Critical reception ===
The film received negative reviews from critics, in contrast to the critical acclaim received by its predecessor. Rotten Tomatoes reported that 27% of critics were positive based on 11 reviews. On Metacritic, the film has a score of 44 out of 100 based on 10 reviews, indicating "mixed or average" reviews.

Janet Maslin of The New York Times called it "grotesquely misconceived, so much so that it nearly eradicates fond memories of the original ... The times— the story is scattered like buckshot from 1964 to 1967— have grown dangerous, but these people haven't awakened at all. They're still the same fun-loving rock-and-rollers, and there's nothing they can't trivialize. So here is a comic look at campus rioting. Here are the beach party aspects of the Vietnam War." Dale Pollock of Variety stated in his review that "More American Graffiti may be one of the most innovative and ambitious films of the last five years, but by no means is it one of the most successful ... without a dramatic glue to hold the disparate story elements together, Graffiti is too disorganized for its own good, and the cross-cutting between different film styles only accentuates the problem."

Gene Siskel of the Chicago Tribune gave the film two out of four stars and called it "one long confusing movie" that is "really too ambitious for its own good." On Sneak Previews, Roger Ebert said he thought it was a "much better film" than Siskel did, that he "had no trouble following it" and that "it's a film worth seeing."

Charles Champlin of the Los Angeles Times was also positive, writing that "the protagonists are affecting as before and More American Graffiti is an uncommonly evocative trip back to our common past— a stirring reminder in both style and substance of what we've been through." Gary Arnold of The Washington Post wrote "All this fussy, arbitrary switching of scenes, years and aspect ratios may wow them back in film school, but the complicated framework reveals nothing but one inconsequential or misleading vignette after another. Norton doesn't achieve a true dramatic convergence of parallel stories; and his historical vision is confined to cheerleading reaffirmations of all the old counterculture clichés about war, cops, Women's Liberation, you name it."

Veronica Geng of The New Yorker called the film "a mess of time shifts and pointless, confusing split-screen techniques that make the images look dinky instead of multiplying their impact. For as busy a movie I have seen, it is visually one of the most boring. Norton trades in the grammar of moving pictures for a formula that says the sixties equals fragmentation equals split screen— and split screen we get; baby's first jigsaw puzzles of simultaneous action, until we long for a simple cut from a moving car to a closeup of the driver." David Ansen of Newsweek wrote "This is all very film-school fancy, but what does it mean? Alas, precious little. More in this case is decidedly less. Once you get used to the cross-cutting— which is rather like switching channels between four different TV shows— the realization dawns that none of the segments is particularly interesting."

==== Retrospective assessments ====
George Lucas reflected on the experience in 1997 during the production of Star Wars: Episode I – The Phantom Menace, remarking to Frank Oz: "You just never know on these things. I did a More American Graffiti; it made ten cents. Just failed miserably."

In 2021, The Guardian's Matt Mitchell wrote about the film, by then "largely forgotten", for the newspaper's "Hear Me Out" series, in which critics argue for more favorable receptions for films often seen as artistic failures. He argued that its commercial failure was all but certain given its box office competition on opening weekend (Apocalypse Now and Monty Python's Life of Brian), and that it suffered by association with most sequels at the time being perceived as financially motivated since they were not part of studios' business models yet. "More American Graffiti is an experimental love-letter to teenage omnipotence becoming adult mortality", centered around Milner's death and the characters in the later storylines processing it. "There is a beautiful melancholia lurking beneath the comedic surface. It's an empathetic look at the distances in which our sorrows can migrate."
