= Indiana Jones and the Temple of Doom =

1984 film by Steven Spielberg

- Theatrical release poster by Drew Struzan
- Directed by: Steven Spielberg
- Screenplay by: Willard Huyck; Gloria Katz
- Story by: George Lucas
- Produced by: Robert Watts
- Starring: Harrison Ford; Kate Capshaw; Amrish Puri; Roshan Seth; Philip Stone; Ke Huy Quan
- Cinematography: Douglas Slocombe
- Edited by: Michael Kahn
- Music by: John Williams
- Production company: Lucasfilm Ltd.
- Distributed by: Paramount Pictures
- Release dates: April 23, 1984 (Thousand Oaks); May 23, 1984 (United States)
- Running time: 117 minutes
- Country: United States
- Language: English
- Budget: $28 million
- Box office: $333.1 million

Indiana Jones and the Temple of Doom is a 1984 American action-adventure film directed by Steven Spielberg from a script by Willard Huyck and Gloria Katz, based on a story by George Lucas. It is the second installment in the Indiana Jones film series and a prequel to Raiders of the Lost Ark. The film stars Harrison Ford, who reprises his role as the titular character. Kate Capshaw, Amrish Puri, Roshan Seth, Philip Stone and Ke Huy Quan (in his film debut) star in supporting roles. In the film, set in 1935, Indiana Jones finds himself stranded in British India, where he is tasked with recovering a village's mystical stone and rescuing its children from a Thuggee cult practicing child slavery, black magic and ritual human sacrifice in honor of the goddess Kali, portrayed as a demon.

Not wishing to feature the Nazis as the villains again, executive producer and story writer George Lucas decided to regard this film as a prequel. Three plot devices were rejected before Lucas wrote a film treatment that resembled the final storyline. As Lawrence Kasdan, Lucas's collaborator on Raiders of the Lost Ark, turned down the offer to write the script, Willard Huyck and Gloria Katz, who had previously worked with Lucas on American Graffiti (1973), were hired as his replacements.

Indiana Jones and the Temple of Doom was released by Paramount Pictures on May 23, 1984, to financial success, grossing $333.1 million worldwide and becoming the highest-grossing film of 1984. Initial critical reviews were mixed, with criticism aimed at the strong violence, darker story elements, and Capshaw's performance, as well as controversy over the film's portrayal of India. Critical opinion has improved since 1984, citing the film's intensity and imagination. In response to some of the more violent sequences in the film, and with similar complaints about the Spielberg-produced Gremlins (which released two weeks later), Spielberg suggested that the Motion Picture Association of America (MPAA) alter its rating system, which it did within two months of the film's release, creating a new PG-13 rating. (Note: Contrary to popular belief, Indiana Jones and the Temple of Doom and Gremlins were both released in the US with a PG (not PG-13) rating, although controversy surrounding the two films did lead to the subsequent creation of the PG-13 rating. The first film to be issued the new PG-13 rating was The Flamingo Kid, although Red Dawn was the first to be released theatrically under the new rating.) Temple of Doom was nominated for the Academy Award for Best Original Score and won the Academy Award for Best Visual Effects. A third film, Indiana Jones and the Last Crusade, followed in 1989.

== Plot ==
In 1935, American archeologist Indiana Jones survives a murder attempt in Shanghai by Triad crime boss Lao Che, who hired him to retrieve the remains of Nurhaci. (Note: As depicted in the video game Indiana Jones and the Emperor's Tomb (2003)) Jones flees from the city accompanied by his young orphan sidekick Short Round and nightclub singer Willie Scott, unaware that the plane they are traveling on is owned by Lao Che. The plane's pilots dump the fuel and parachute away, but Jones, Willie, and Short Round escape using an inflatable raft before the plane crashes. The trio ride down the slopes of the Himalayas and fall into a river before arriving at the Indian village of Mayapore.

The villagers plead for Jones' aid in retrieving a sacred lingam stone, along with the village's children, who were supposedly taken by evil forces from the nearby Pankot Palace. Jones agrees to do so, hypothesizing that the stone is one of five Sankara stones given by the Hindu gods to help humanity fight evil. Traveling to the palace, the trio are warmly welcomed and allowed to stay for the night as guests, attending a banquet hosted by the palace's young maharaja, Zalim Singh. During the night, Jones is attacked by an assassin, but manages to kill him. He discovers a series of tunnels underneath the palace and explores them with Willie and Short Round.

Finding a temple and a complex of mine tunnels, they observe Thuggee cultists conducting a human sacrifice. The cult, which possesses three Sankara stones, is revealed to have brainwashed Singh and abducted the children of Mayapore, using them as slave labor to find the remaining stones. During Jones' attempt to retrieve the stones, the trio is captured. Thuggee high priest Mola Ram forces Jones to drink a potion that places him into a trance-like state, under which he prepares Willie for sacrifice. Short Round is briefly enslaved in the tunnels, but he escapes and interrupts Willie's sacrifice by freeing Jones from his trance, allowing him to rescue Willie.

The trio defeat multiple cultists, collect the Sankara stones, and free Singh and the children, escaping an attempt by Mola Ram to drown them. When he and his men ambush the trio on a rope bridge, Jones severs it with a sword, causing several cultists to fall into the crocodile-infested river far below. As Jones, Willie, Short Round, and Mola Ram struggle to climb up the broken bridge, Jones invokes the name of Shiva, triggering the stones to burn through his satchel. Two stones fall into the river; Mola Ram catches the third, but it burns his hand and he falls to his death, being devoured by the crocodiles.

Jones catches the stone with no ill effects and climbs up as a regiment of British Indian Army soldiers arrives, alerted by Singh, to defeat the remaining cultists. Jones, Willie, and Short Round return to Mayapore to hand over the stone, and Jones and Willie embrace as the villagers celebrate its and their children's return.

== Cast ==
- Harrison Ford as Indiana Jones: An archaeologist adventurer who is asked by a desperate Indian village to retrieve a mysterious stone and rescue the missing village children. Ford undertook a strict physical exercise regimen headed by Jake Steinfeld to gain a more muscular tone for the part.
- Ke Huy Quan as Short Round: Indy's young Chinese sidekick, who drives the 1936 Auburn Boat Tail Speedster that allows Indy to escape Shanghai. Quan was chosen as part of a casting call in Los Angeles. Around 6,000 actors auditioned worldwide for the part, including Peter Shinkoda; Quan was cast after his brother auditioned for the role. Spielberg liked his personality, so he and Ford improvised the scene where Short Round accuses Indy of cheating during a card game.
- Kate Capshaw as Wilhelmina "Willie" Scott: An American nightclub singer working in Shanghai. In a nod to the Star Wars franchise, the nightclub is called Club Obi-Wan. Willie is unprepared for her adventure with Indy and Short Round, and appears to be a damsel in distress. She also forms a romantic relationship with Indy. Over 120 actresses auditioned for the role, including Sharon Stone. To prepare for the role, Capshaw watched The African Queen (1951) and A Guy Named Joe (1943). Spielberg wanted Willie to be a complete contrast to Marion Ravenwood from Raiders of the Lost Ark, so Capshaw dyed her brown hair blonde for the part. Costume designer Anthony Powell wanted the character to have red hair.
- Amrish Puri as Mola Ram: A Thuggee priest who performs rites of human sacrifices. The character is named after an 18th-century Indian painter. Lucas wanted Mola Ram to be terrifying, so the screenwriters added elements of Aztec and Hawaiian human sacrificers and European devil worship to the character. To create his headdress, make-up artist Tom Smith based the skull on a cow (as this would be sacrilegious), and used a latex shrunken head.
- Roshan Seth as Chattar Lal: The Prime Minister of the Maharaja of Pankot. Chattar, also a Thuggee worshipper, is enchanted by Indy, Willie, and Short Round's arrival, but is offended by Indy's questioning of the palace's history and the archaeologist's own dubious past.
- Philip Stone as Captain Philip Blumburtt: A British Indian Army officer on a routine inspection tour of Pankot Palace and the surrounding area. He assists Indiana by fighting off Thuggee cultists at the bridge with his regiment, the 11th Poona Rifles.

Additionally, Roy Chiao portrays Lao Che, a Shanghai crime boss who, with his sons Chen (Chua Kah Joo) and Kao Kan (Ric Young), hires Indy to recover the cremated ashes of one of his ancestors. David Yip (in his film debut) portrays Wu Han, a friend of Indy, who is killed in Club Obi Wan. Raj Singh portrays Zalim Singh, the adolescent Maharaja of Pankot (his voice is dubbed by Katie Leigh). D. R. Nanayakkara portrays the village Shaman, the leader of the small village of Mayapore that recruits Indy to retrieve their stolen sacred stone. Denawaka Hamine and Iranganie Serasinghe play two of the village women.

Professional wrestler Pat Roach plays the Thuggee overseer in the mines whom Indy has a large brawl with; Roach had previously appeared as a German mechanic and a Giant Sherpa who brawls with Indy in Raiders of the Lost Ark. Dan Aykroyd appears briefly and with a British accent as Earl Weber, who arranges air transport out of Shanghai for Jones, Willie, and Short Round and meets them at the airport. Steven Spielberg, George Lucas, Frank Marshall, and Kathleen Kennedy have cameos at the airport.

== Production ==
=== Development ===
Spielberg later recalled that when Lucas first approached him for Raiders of the Lost Ark, "George said if I directed the first one then I would have to direct a trilogy. He had three stories in mind. It turned out George did not have three stories in mind, and we had to make up subsequent stories." Both men later attributed the film's tone, which was darker than Raiders of the Lost Ark, to their personal moods following the breakups of their relationships. In addition, Lucas felt "it had to have been a dark film. The way Empire Strikes Back was the dark second act of the Star Wars trilogy." Spielberg had said "The danger in making a sequel is that you can never satisfy everyone. If you give people the same movie with different scenes, they say 'why weren't you more original?'" "But if you give them the same character in another fantastic adventure, but with a different tone, you risk disappointing the other half of the audience who just wanted a carbon copy of the first film with a different girl and a different bad guy. So you win and you lose both ways."

Lucas set the film a year earlier than the first to avoid re-using the Nazis as the villains. Spielberg originally wanted to bring Marion Ravenwood back, with Abner Ravenwood considered as a possible character. In developing the story, Lucas conceived of an opening chase scene with Indiana Jones on a motorcycle on the Great Wall of China, followed by the discovery of a "Lost World pastiche with a hidden valley inhabited by dinosaurs". Another idea was to feature the Monkey King as the plot device. However, Chinese authorities refused permission for them to film in the country, requiring a different setting. Lucas wrote a film treatment that included a haunted castle in Scotland, but Spielberg felt it was too similar to Poltergeist (1982); so the setting transformed into a demonic temple in India.

Lucas came up with ideas that involved a religious cult devoted to child slavery, black magic, and ritual human sacrifice. Lawrence Kasdan of Raiders of the Lost Ark was asked to write the script. "I didn't want to be associated with Temple of Doom," he reflected. "I just thought it was horrible. It's so mean. There's nothing pleasant about it. I think Temple of Doom represents a chaotic period in both their [Lucas's and Spielberg's] lives, and the movie is very ugly and mean-spirited." Lucas hired Willard Huyck and Gloria Katz to write the script because of their knowledge of Indian culture. Gunga Din (1939) served as an influence for the film.

Huyck and Katz spent four days at Skywalker Ranch for story discussions with Lucas and Spielberg in early 1982. They later said the early plot consisted of two notions of Lucas's: that Indy would recover something stolen from a village and decide whether to give it back, and that the picture would start in China and work its way to India. Huyck says Lucas was very single-minded about getting through meetings, while "Steve would always stop and think about visual stuff."

Lucas's initial idea for Indiana's sidekick was a virginal young princess, but Huyck, Katz, and Spielberg disliked the idea. Just as Indiana Jones was named after Lucas's Alaskan Malamute, the character of Willie was named after Spielberg's Cocker Spaniel, and Short Round was named after Huyck's dog, whose name was derived from The Steel Helmet (1951).

Lucas handed Huyck and Katz a 20-page treatment in May 1982 titled Indiana Jones and the Temple of Death to adapt into a screenplay. Scenes such as the fight scene in Shanghai, the escape from the airplane, and the mine cart chase came from earlier scripts of Raiders of the Lost Ark. In Raiders, the headpiece for the Staff of Ra was originally conceived to be in two pieces, with the first piece in the museum of General Hok, a Japanese-allied Chinese warlord in Shanghai. Jones was planned to steal that piece, and then use a giant gong as a shield as General Hok fired a submachine gun at him during his escape, much like the final moments in Club Obi-Wan. Kasdan said that was too expensive to produce for the earlier movie. After that, Jones was to fly to Nepal to find Marion and the second piece. In flight, he fell asleep and all of the other passengers on the plane bailed out and parachuted to safety, leaving him to escape alone using an inflatable raft to slide down a Himalayan slope to Marion's bar. Kasdan said this was cut because it interrupted the story flow and was "too unbelievable," a complaint leveled by some critics at the finished scene.

Lucas, Huyck, and Katz had been developing Radioland Murders (1994) since the early 1970s. The opening music was taken from that script and applied to Temple of Doom. Spielberg reflected, "George's idea was to start the movie with a musical number. He wanted to do a Busby Berkeley dance number. At all our story meetings he would say, 'Hey, Steven, you always said you wanted to shoot musicals.' I thought, 'Yeah, that could be fun.'"

Lucas, Spielberg, Katz, and Huyck were concerned how to keep the audience interested while explaining the Thuggee cult. Huyck and Katz proposed a tiger hunt but Spielberg stated, "There's no way I'm going to stay in India long enough to shoot a tiger hunt." They eventually decided on a dinner scene involving eating bugs (which were made of rubber and filled with custard), monkey brains (raspberry flavored custard), and the like. "Steve and George both still react like children, so their idea was to make it as gross as possible," says Katz.

Lucas sent Huyck and Katz a 500-page transcript of their taped conversations to help them with the script. The first draft was written in six weeks, in early August 1982. "Steve was coming off an enormously successful movie [E.T.] and George didn't want to lose him," said Katz. "He desperately wanted him to direct (Temple of Doom). We were under a lot of pressure to do it really, really fast so we could hold on to Steve."

A second draft was finished by September. Captain Blumburtt, Chattar Lal, and the boy Maharaja originally had more crucial roles. A dogfight scene was deleted, as were scenes where those who drank the Kali blood turned into zombies with physical superhuman abilities. During pre-production, the Temple of Death title was replaced with Temple of Doom. From March to April 1983, Huyck and Katz simultaneously performed rewrites for a final shooting script. One scene that made it into the script, but was dropped during filming, was about a snake coiling around Willie. As Capshaw has a fear of snakes, Spielberg noticed how difficult it was for her to film the scene, and decided to skip it.

Huyck and Katz later said Harrison Ford took many of the one liners originally given to Short Round.

=== Casting ===
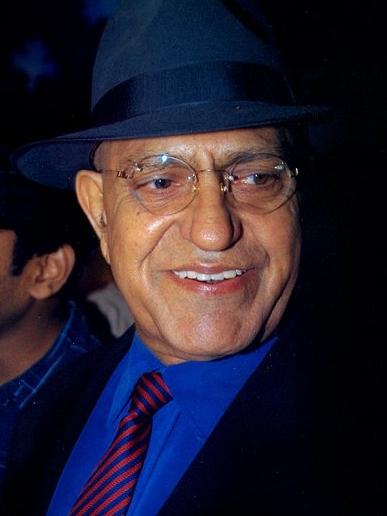
Amrish Puri had been working on 18 films in India upon being cast as the villain Mola Ram. Spielberg later remarked "Amrish is my favorite villain. The best the world has ever produced and ever will."

Harrison Ford reprised his role of Indiana Jones from Raiders of the Lost Ark. For the role of Willie Scott, more than 100 actresses auditioned. Among the totally unknown actresses auditioning for the role was Sharon Stone. Finally, Spielberg chose Kate Capshaw after viewing her videotaped test and showing it to Ford. For the role of Short Round, casting director Mike Fenton arranged open calls for East Asian boys to come in to audition in several major cities, including New York, San Francisco, Los Angeles, Hawaii, Toronto, Chicago, Montreal, Hong Kong, and London. Originally, Ke Huy Quan's younger brother went to audition for the role while Quan tagged along. The producers had noticed that Quan was giving his brother directions behind the camera during the audition, so the casting director had asked Quan to give it a shot, and was cast a few days later.

For the various Indian characters in the film, the villagers were played by Sri Lankan actors and actresses, while the characters in Pankot Palace were primarily played by Indian actors. For the role of Mola Ram, the arch-villain, they searched through England and the United States to find someone to play the part, as both Lucas and Spielberg were most anxious that they did not cast the principal Indian roles with Western actors darkened down. They couldn't find anybody amongst the resident Indian actors in the United States, and so they got a permit for Amrish Puri, who was working on 18 films in India simultaneously at the time of his casting. Puri had met with Spielberg and initially declined the role, but was convinced after speaking with Richard Attenborough, whom Puri had worked with on a small part in Gandhi (1982). Roshan Seth, who played prime minister Chattar Lal, also appeared in Gandhi alongside Puri.

=== Filming ===
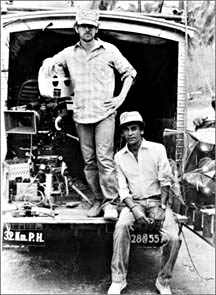
Steven Spielberg and Production Supervisor Chandran Rutnam on location in Kandy, Sri Lanka, during the filming of Indiana Jones and the Temple of Doom

The filmmakers were denied permission to film in North India and Amer Fort, due to the government finding the script offensive. Producer Frank Marshall explained that "originally the scenes were going to be shot in India at a fantastic palace. They required us to give them a script, so we sent it over and we didn't think it was going to be a problem. But because of the voodoo element with Mola Ram and the Thuggees, the Indian government was a little bit hesitant to give us permission. They wanted us to do things like not use the term Maharajah, and they didn't want us to shoot in a particular temple that we had picked. The Indian government wanted changes to the script and final cut privilege."

As a result, location work went to Kandy, Sri Lanka, with matte paintings and scale models applied for the village, temple, and Pankot Palace. Budgetary inflation also caused Temple of Doom to cost $28.17 million, $8 million more than Raiders of the Lost Ark. Filming began on April 18, 1983, in Kandy, and moved to Elstree Studios in Hertfordshire, England on May 5. Marshall recalled, "when filming the bug scenes, crew members would go home and find bugs in their hair, clothes and shoes." Eight out of the nine sound stages at Elstree housed the filming of Temple of Doom. Lucas biographer Marcus Hearn observed, "Douglas Slocombe's skillful lighting helped disguise the fact that about 80 percent of the film was shot with sound stages."

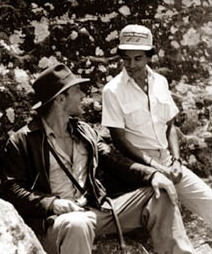
Harrison Ford with Rutnam on the set of Indiana Jones and the Temple of Doom in Sri Lanka in 1983

Danny Daniels choreographed the opening music number "Anything Goes". Capshaw learned to sing in Mandarin and took tap dance lessons. However the dress was fitted so tightly that Capshaw was not able to dance in it. Made by Barbara Matera out of original 1920s and 1930s beads, the dress was one of a kind. The opening dance number was actually the last scene to be shot, but the dress did feature in some earlier location shots in Sri Lanka, drying on a nearby tree. An elephant started to eat it, tearing the whole back of the dress. Consequently, some emergency repair work had to be done by Matera with what remained of the original beads, and it was costume designer Anthony Powell who had to fill in the insurance forms. As to the reason for damage, he had no option but to put "dress eaten by elephant".

In a 2003 documentary on the making of the film (first released when the original trilogy made its debut on DVD), costume designer Anthony Powell stated that only one evening dress was made for Capshaw due to the limited amount of original 1920s and 1930s beads and sequins (story above). However, there have been more than one of Capshaw's evening dresses on display at the same time in different countries during exhibitions – from late 2014, a dress was on display at the Hollywood Costume exhibition in Los Angeles (exhibition ran from October 2, 2014 – March 2, 2015). At the very same time, the traveling "Indiana Jones: Adventure of Archaeology" exhibition was on display in Edmonton in Canada (October 11, 2014 – April 6, 2015) and there featured another of the red and gold dresses.

Production designer Norman Reynolds could not return for Temple of Doom because of his commitment to Return to Oz (1985). Elliot Scott, Reynolds' mentor, was hired. To build the rope bridge the filmmakers found a group of British engineers from Balfour Beatty working on the nearby Victoria Dam. Harrison Ford suffered a severe spinal disc herniation by performing a somersault while filming the scene with the assassin in Jones's bedroom. A hospital bed was brought on set for Ford to rest between takes. Lucas stated, "He could barely stand up, yet he was there every day so shooting would not stop. He was in incomprehensible pain, but he was still trying to make it happen." With no alternatives, Lucas shut down production while Ford was flown to Centinela Hospital on June 21 for recovery. Stunt double Vic Armstrong spent five weeks as a stand-in for various shots. Wendy Leech, Armstrong's wife, served as Capshaw's stunt double.

Macau, then a Portuguese colony, was substituted for Shanghai, while cinematographer Douglas Slocombe caught fever from June 24 to July 7 and could not work. Ford returned on August 8. Despite the problems during filming, Spielberg was able to complete Temple of Doom on schedule and on budget, finishing principal photography on August 26. Various pickups took place afterwards. This included Mammoth Mountain, Tuolumne River, American River, Yosemite National Park, San Joaquin Valley, Hamilton Air Force Base (all located in California), Snake River Canyon in Idaho, and Arizona. Producer Marshall directed a second unit in Florida in January 1984, using alligators to double as crocodiles. The mine chase was a combination of a roller coaster and scale models with dolls doubling for the actors. Minor stop-motion was also used for the sequence. Visual effects supervisors Dennis Muren, Joe Johnston and a crew at Industrial Light & Magic provided the visual effects work, while Skywalker Sound, headed by Ben Burtt, commissioned the sound design. Burtt recorded roller coasters at Disneyland Park in Anaheim for the mine cart scene. Marshall recalled that filming the bugs was difficult, more so than the snakes in Raiders of the Lost Ark: "The bugs were much harder to work with than the snakes. You can arrange a pile of snakes. That's impossible with bugs. People were also much more scared of the insects. Every once in a while you'd hear this shriek when the bugs found their way on to the tap-dance rehearsal stage - a bad place for any bug to be." Ke Huy Quan recalled that while filming a scary sequence, he started crying until Ford calmed him down, assuring him "I will never hurt you!".

=== Editing ===
"After I showed the film to George [Lucas], at an hour and 55 minutes, we looked at each other," Spielberg remembered. "The first thing that we said was, 'Too fast'. We needed to decelerate the action. I did a few more matte shots to slow it down. We made it a little bit slower, by putting breathing room back in so there'd be a two-hour oxygen supply for the audience."

== Release ==
=== Box office ===
Temple of Doom was released on May 23, 1984, in the United States, accumulating a record-breaking $45.7 million in its first week. The film went on to gross $333.1 million worldwide, with $180 million in North America and $153.1 million in other markets. The film had the highest opening weekend of 1984, and was that year's highest-grossing film (third in North America, behind Beverly Hills Cop and Ghostbusters). It was also the tenth highest-grossing film of all time during its release. It sold an estimated 53,532,800 tickets in the United States. In South Korea, the film recorded 808,492 admissions in Seoul following its release on May 8, 1985, ranking second at the box office that year behind The Killing Fields.

=== Promotion ===
Marvel Comics published a comic book adaptation of the film by writer David Michelinie and artists Jackson Guice, Ian Akin, Brian Garvey, and Bob Camp. It was published as Marvel Super Special No. 30 and as a three-issue limited series.

LucasArts and Atari Games promoted the film by releasing an arcade game. Hasbro released a toy line based on the film in September 2008.

=== Home media ===
The video was released at Christmas 1986 with a retail price of $29.95 and sold a record 1.4 million units. A DVD version of the film was released in 2003 together with the two other films in the Indiana Jones then-trilogy. A Blu-ray version for the film was released in 2012 as part of a box set for the series, which had four films at the time. In 2021, a remastered 4K version of the film was released on Ultra HD Blu-ray, produced using scans of the original film negatives. It was released as part of a box set for the then four films in the Indiana Jones film series.

=== Television ===
In Japan, the film was aired on Nippon TV (NTV), on October 16, 1987. It became NTV's most-watched film up until then with a 26.9% audience rating, surpassing the 25.3% record previously set by First Blood (1982) in 1985. In turn, Temple of Doom was later surpassed by Tsuribaka Nisshi 4 (1991) in 1994, but remained NTV's most-watched foreign film up until Harry Potter and the Philosopher's Stone (2001) in 2004.

In the United Kingdom, the film's 2005 airing was watched by 5 million viewers on BBC1, becoming the channel's ninth most-watched film during the first half of 2005.

== Reception ==
=== Critical response ===
Indiana Jones and the Temple of Doom received mixed reviews upon its release, but over the years, the film's critical reception has improved. On Rotten Tomatoes, the film has an approval rating of 77% based on 138 reviews, with an average rating of 7.4/10. The site's critical consensus reads, "It may be too 'dark' for some, but Indiana Jones and the Temple of Doom remains an ingenious adventure spectacle that showcases one of Hollywood's finest filmmaking teams in vintage form." On Metacritic the film has a weighted average score of 57 out of 100, based on 14 critics, indicating "mixed or average" reviews.

Roger Ebert gave the film a perfect four-star rating, calling it "one of the greatest Bruised Forearm Movies ever made. You know what a Bruised Forearm Movie is. That's the kind of movie where your date is always grabbing your forearm in a vice-like grip, as unbearable excitement unfolds on the screen ... Indiana Jones and the Temple of Doom makes no apologies for being exactly what it is: Exhilarating, manic, wildly imaginative escapism ... This is the most cheerfully exciting, bizarre, goofy, romantic adventure movie since Raiders, and it is high praise to say that it's not so much a sequel as an equal ... You stagger out with a silly grin." Vincent Canby felt the film was "too shapeless to be the fun that Raiders is, but shape may be beside the point. Old-time, 15-part movie serials didn't have shape. They just went on and on and on, which is what Temple of Doom does with humor and technical invention." Neal Gabler commented that "I think in some ways, Indiana Jones and the Temple of Doom was better than Raiders of the Lost Ark. In some ways it was less. In sum total, I'd have to say I enjoyed it more. That doesn't mean it's better necessarily, but I got more enjoyment out of it."

John Nubbin reviewed Indiana Jones and the Temple of Doom for Different Worlds magazine and stated that "Spielberg, for better or worse, has gone past the parameters of the first film, doing more with the period he is recreating and the type of film and story he is honoring."

Colin Covert of the Star Tribune called the film "sillier, darkly violent and a bit dumbed down, but still great fun." Pauline Kael preferred it to Raiders, writing: "The subject of a movie can be momentum. It has often been the true—even if not fully acknowledged—subject of movies. In Indiana Jones and the Temple of Doom, it's not just acknowledged, it's gloried in...The whole movie is a shoot-the-chutes, and toward the end, when the heroic trio, having found the sacred stone and freed the stolen children from the maharajah's mines, are trying to escape in a tiny mine car, and a shift in camera angles places us with them on a literal rollercoaster ride, the audience laughs in recognition that that's what we've been on all along...The movie relates to Americans' love of getting in the car and just taking off—it's a breeze."

Dave Kehr stated "The film betrays no human impulse higher than that of a ten-year-old boy trying to gross out his baby sister by dangling a dead worm in her face." Ralph Novak of People complained "The ads that say 'this film may be too intense for younger children' are fraudulent. No parent should allow a young child to see this traumatizing movie; it would be a cinematic form of child abuse. Even Harrison Ford is required to slap Quan and abuse Capshaw. There are no heroes connected with the film, only two villains; their names are Steven Spielberg and George Lucas." The Observer described it as "a thin, arch, graceless affair." The Guardian summarized it as "a two-hour series of none too carefully linked chase sequences ... sitting on the edge of your seat gives you a sore bum but also a numb brain." Leonard Maltin gave the film only two out of four stars, saying that it is "headache inducing" and "never gives us a chance to breathe", and chiding the "'gross-out' gags." Colin Greenland reviewed the film for Imagine magazine, and stated that "Raiders had the wit and lightness of touch not to take itself too seriously. Temple starts well, but promptly loses itself in clamorous self-importance. I couldn't care less if it outgrosses Raiders. It grossed me out."

In 2014, Time Out polled several film critics, directors, actors, and stunt actors to list their top action films. Indiana Jones and the Temple of Doom was listed at 71st place on this list.

Director Quentin Tarantino stated that Indiana Jones and the Temple of Doom is his favorite of the series, as well as Spielberg's second-best film behind Jaws (1975). "[Spielberg] pushes the envelope, he creates PG-13, a movie so badass it created a new level in the MPAA," further adding "there is a comedy aspect as gruesome as the cinema is; there is an ultimate comedy aspect that's just not quite there as much in the first one."

=== Reception from the cast and crew ===
The character Willie Scott has often been criticized for its shrillness, with Capshaw calling Willie "not much more than a dumb screaming blonde," further adding that she "was blind-sided" by the reaction to her character. "The thing that surprised me the most was that the critics, women critics in particular, were very critical of Willie Scott, as if we were making a political statement and I was doing nothing for my sisters. I found it odd that it was an action-adventure film and we were meant to be doing message work."

When promoting the sequel Indiana Jones and the Last Crusade in 1989, Spielberg said "I wasn't happy with Temple of Doom at all. It was too dark, too subterranean, and much too horrific. I thought it out-poltered Poltergeist. There's not an ounce of my own personal feeling in Temple of Doom." He later added during the Making of Indiana Jones and the Temple of Doom documentary, "Temple of Doom is my least favorite of the trilogy. I look back and I say, 'Well the greatest thing that I got out of that was I met Kate Capshaw.' We married years later and that to me was the reason I was fated to make Temple of Doom." Lucas, who had been going through a divorce with Marcia Lucas during the making of the film, attributed the film's darkness to his relationship problems, but in regard to the film said, "I love the movie, it's just slightly darker in tone and not as fun as the first."

Seth commented "Let me tell you—the first 15 minutes of Indiana Jones And The Temple of Doom are perhaps the greatest 15 minutes in cinema. They are all about what cinema should be: sitting on the edge of your seat in excitement." Ford remarked "I felt it was funny and explored interesting, dark places. That scene where he takes the heart out, that was a new thing, a dark thing. But I enjoyed that about it. It also possesses some of the craziest action, the most energy. I think it is a good film."

=== Depiction of India ===
The depiction of India in Temple of Doom was criticized, and the film received a temporary ban in India. It was later released in the country when it came out on home video. A group of 30–50 people in Seattle, Washington, appeared in the local newspapers when they protested the film for depicting Indians as either helpless or evil.

The depiction of Indian cuisine was heavily criticized, as dishes such as baby snakes, eyeball soup, beetles, and chilled monkey brains are not Indian foods. Professor Yvette Rosser wrote that "[it] seems to have been taken as a valid portrayal of India by many teachers, since a large number of students surveyed complained that teachers referred to the eating of monkey brains." Another heavily criticized aspect was the film's white savior narrative, with Indiana being depicted as a great white hero upon landing in a remote Indian village, with the villagers unable to help themselves.

Roshan Seth, who played Chattar Lal, mentioned that the banquet scene was a joke that went wrong, saying, "Steven intended it as a joke, the joke being that Indians were so smart that they knew all Westerners think that Indians eat cockroaches, so they served them what they expected. The joke was too subtle for that film." In his autobiography, Amrish Puri described the controversy around the film as "silly". He wrote that "it's based on an ancient cult that existed in India and was recreated like a fantasy. If you recall those imaginary places like Pankot Palace, starting with Shanghai, where the plane breaks down and the passengers use a raft to jump over it, slide down a hill and reach India, can this ever happen? But fantasies are fantasies, like our Panchatantra and folklore. I know we are sensitive about our cultural identity, but we do this to ourselves in our own films. It's only when some foreign directors do it that we start cribbing."

=== Depiction of Hinduism ===
The movie has additionally been criticized for its depiction of the Hindu religion. Kali, a Hindu mother goddess, is portrayed within the movie as a demon whose devotees commit ritual murder, in a direct tribute to Gunga Din. This depiction, as well as the depiction of the Thuggee as a murderous Hindu sect, has been traced to the times of the British Raj. Scholars have found no evidence that the Thuggee were particularly associated with worship of Kali, nor of them having been anything more than bandits; they argue this religious framing was the invention of Orientalists with a limited knowledge of the Hindu Shakta tradition.

Advocacy group Hindus for Human Rights (HfHR), and Pushpita Prasad writing for American Kahani, both argue that the movie portrayed Hinduism in a highly derogatory and bigoted manner; they also note this portrayal has deeply shaped the way American outsiders have viewed Hinduism. Additionally, Sailaja Krishnamurti, professor at Queen's University, notes Temple of Doom's depiction of Hindu ritual, which she derides as "obviously fantastical" but "among the only representations of Hinduism of any kind in American popular culture", in establishing "very problematic perceptions of Hinduism as a mysterious, dangerous Eastern religion'.

=== PG rating ===
Many parents who took their children to see the film complained that some sequences in the film were too violent for its PG rating, particularly sequences involving human sacrifice and children being flogged. Spielberg had initially defended the violence, stating "the picture is not called Temple of Roses, it is called Temple of Doom. There are parts of this film that are too intense for younger children, but this is a fantasy adventure. It is the kind of violence that does not really happen and cannot be perpetuated by people leaving the cinema and performing those tricks on their friends at home."

In response to some of the more violent sequences in the film, and with similar complaints about Gremlins (which released two weeks later), Spielberg suggested that the Motion Picture Association of America (MPAA) alter its rating system by introducing an intermediary between the PG and R ratings. The MPAA concurred, and a new PG-13 rating was introduced two months after the film's release. In the UK, the film was heavily censored for a PG rating. The United Kingdom followed suit five years later, with the BBFC introducing the 12 rating and Batman (1989) being the first film to receive it. Temple of Doom was itself re-rated 12, uncut, in 2012.

== Accolades ==
Dennis Muren and Industrial Light & Magic's visual effects department won the Academy Award for Best Visual Effects at the 57th Academy Awards. Soundtrack composer John Williams was, as he had been for his work on Raiders of the Lost Ark, again nominated for Original Music Score. The visual effects crew won the same category at the 38th British Academy Film Awards. Cinematographer Douglas Slocombe, editor Michael Kahn, Ben Burtt and other sound designers at Skywalker Sound received nominations. Spielberg, the writers, Harrison Ford, Jonathan Ke Quan, Anthony Powell and makeup designer Tom Smith were nominated for their work at the Saturn Awards. Temple of Doom was nominated for Best Fantasy Film but lost to Ghostbusters.

| Award | Category | Recipient | Result |
|---|---|---|---|
| Academy Awards | Best Original Score | John Williams | Nominated |
| Academy Awards | Best Visual Effects | Dennis Muren, Michael J. McAlister, Lorne Peterson, George Gibbs | Won |
| British Academy Film Awards | Best Cinematography | Douglas Slocombe | Nominated |
| British Academy Film Awards | Best Editing | Michael Kahn | Nominated |
| British Academy Film Awards | Best Sound | Ben Burtt, Simon Kaye, Laurel Ladevich | Nominated |
| British Academy Film Awards | Best Special Visual Effects | Dennis Muren, George Gibbs, Michael J. McAlister, Lorne Peterson | Won |
| Saturn Awards | Best Fantasy Film | Indiana Jones and the Temple of Doom | Nominated |
| Saturn Awards | Best Director | Steven Spielberg | Nominated |
| Saturn Awards | Best Actor | Harrison Ford | Nominated |
| Saturn Awards | Best Performance by a Younger Actor | Jonathan Ke Quan | Nominated |
| Saturn Awards | Best Writing | Willard Huyck, Gloria Katz | Nominated |
| Saturn Awards | Best Costume Design | Anthony Powell | Nominated |
| Saturn Awards | Best Make-up | Tom Smith | Nominated |

== Bibliography ==
- Huyck, Willard; Katz, Gloria (October 1984). Indiana Jones and the Temple of Doom: The Illustrated Screenplay. Ballantine Books. ISBN 0345318781.
- Kahn, James (May 1984). Indiana Jones and the Temple of Doom. novelization of the film. Ballantine Books. ISBN 9780345314574.
- Rinzler, J. W.; Bouzereau, Laurent (January 1, 2008). The Complete Making of Indiana Jones. Ebury Publishing. ISBN 9780091926618.
