= Stacey (film) =

1973 film by Andy Sidaris

- Film poster by John Solie
- Directed by: Andy Sidaris
- Written by: William Edgar
- Starring: Anne Randall; Marjorie Bennett; Anitra Ford
- Music by: Don Randi
- Distributed by: New World Pictures
- Release date: June 1973
- Running time: 82 minutes
- Country: United States
- Language: English

Stacey is a 1973 exploitation film directed by Andy Sidaris. Half the budget was provided by Roger Corman for New World Pictures; the rest was raised by Sidaris. It was re-released in 1975 as Stacy and Her Gangbusters.

== Plot ==
The protagonist is Stacey Hanson (Anne Randall), a private eye and race car driver. She is hired by aging heiress Florence Chambers (Marjorie Bennett) to investigate several close members of the Chambers family for potential inclusion in her will. They are Florence's nephew John (Stewart Moss), his wife Tish (Anitra Ford), and Florence's grand-niece Pamela (Cristina Raines). All live in Florence's mansion

As it happens, all three potential heirs have something to hide. John is a discreet homosexual; Tish is having an affair with the houseboy Frank (James Westmoreland); and Pamela has dubious friends. Stacey uncovers some family secrets but a greater scandal arises: the scheming houseboy, who was sleeping with and/or blackmailing nearly all members of the family, is murdered. Everyone is a suspect.

Stacey's investigation leads to a helicopter and car chase and gunplay. The murderer turns out to be Pamela, who is a member of a Manson family-like cult. She was planning to frame John and emerge as the last viable heir to the family fortune.

== Cast ==
- Anne Randall as Stacey Hanson
- Marjorie Bennett as Florence Chambers
- Anitra Ford as Tish Chambers
- Alan Landers as Bob Eastwood
- James Westmoreland as Frank Elroy
- Cristina Raines as Pamela Chambers
- Nicholas Georgiade as Matthew
- Richard LePore as Luke
- John Alderman as Dick Hannon
- Stewart Moss as John Chambers

== Production ==
This was the first attempt by Sidaris to produce a film with a female protagonist fighting crime, a traditionally masculine role. The film presaged many 1980s films, including a number of B-pictures produced by Sidaris himself in what he referred to as his "Bullets, Bombs, and Babes" series.

Anne Randall was a Playboy Playmate, the first to appear in a Sidaris' film. Following this film nearly all major female roles in a Sidaris' film were cast with either Playboy Playmates or Penthouse Pets.

== Sources ==
- Andrews, David (2006), "The Disorderly Feminization of Classical Sexploitation", Soft in the Middle: The Contemporary Softcore Feature in Its Contexts, Ohio State University Press, ISBN 978-0814210222
- Coffman, Jason (2012), "The Early Films of Andy Sidaris", Cashiers du Cinemart Issue 17, Impossibly Funky Productions, ISBN 978-1300351405

== See also ==
- List of American films of 1973
