= 1984 Stinkers Bad Movie Awards =

Awards for worst films of 1984

The 7th Stinkers Bad Movie Awards were released by the Hastings Bad Cinema Society in 1985 to honour the worst films the film industry had to offer in 1984. As follows, there was only a Worst Picture category with provided commentary for each nominee, as well as a list of films that were also considered for the final list but ultimately failed to make the cut (26 films total).

== Worst Picture Ballot ==
Film	Production company(s)
Dune	Universal Pictures
Best Defense	Paramount Pictures
Bolero	Cannon Films
The Gods Must Be Crazy	Mimosa/Trimark
Rhinestone	20th Century Fox

=== Dishonourable Mentions ===
- Beat Street (Orion)
- Body Rock (New World)
- Breakin' (MGM/UA)
- Breakin' 2: Electric Boogaloo (TriStar)
- Cannonball Run II (Warner Bros.)
- Cheech & Chong's The Corsican Brothers (Orion)
- City Heat (Warner Bros.)
- The Company of Wolves (ITC)
- Exterminator 2 (Cannon)
- Give My Regards to Broad Street (Fox)
- Hard to Hold (Universal)
- Hot Dog...The Movie (MGM/UA)
- The Ice Pirates (MGM/UA)
- Irreconcilable Differences (Warner Bros.)
- Joy of Sex (Paramount)
- The Lonely Guy (Universal)
- Oh, God! You Devil (Warner Bros.)
- Red Dawn (MGM/UA)
- Sahara (MGM/UA)
- Sheena, Queen of the Jungle (Columbia)
- Silent Night, Deadly Night (TriStar)
- Slapstick of Another Kind (International Film Marketing)
- Supergirl (Columbia-EMI-Warner)
- Teachers (UA)
- Top Secret! (Paramount)
- Where the Boys Are '84 (TriStar)
