= Invasion of the Bee Girls =

1973 film by Denis Sanders

- Theatrical release poster
- Directed by: Denis Sanders
- Written by: Nicholas Meyer
- Produced by: Fred Weintraub; Paul Heller
- Starring: William Smith; Anitra Ford; Victoria Vetri
- Cinematography: Gary Graver
- Edited by: H. & R. Travis Editorial Services
- Music by: Charles Bernstein
- Production company: Sequoia Pictures
- Distributed by: Centaur Releasing
- Release date: June 1, 1973
- Running time: 85 minutes
- Country: United States
- Language: English

Invasion of the Bee Girls (re-released in 1981 as Graveyard Tramps) is a 1973 American science-fiction thriller film directed by Denis Sanders from a screenplay written by Nicholas Meyer, and starring William Smith, Anitra Ford and Victoria Vetri. In the film, a mad scientist (Ford) uses radiation-mutated bee serum to create an army of female beauties who seduce men to death. One by one, the male victims are killed before the local police catch on to the plans of the infected females.

The film was the first film venture of writer Nicholas Meyer, as well as the last feature film directed by Sanders before his death in 1987. The script was altered while Meyer was visiting his parents. When he saw the new script, he wanted to take his name off the project, but was convinced by his manager that he needed a credit.

Invasion of the Bee Girls was released by Centaur Releasing on June 1, 1973.

== Plot ==
Neil Agar, a special agent with the State Department's Office of Security (the predecessor of the Diplomatic Security Service), is dispatched to Peckham, California to investigate the death of John Grubowsky, a bacteriologist working at the government-sponsored Brandt Research. Quickly making the acquaintance of the laboratory's head librarian, Julie Zorn, he begins interviewing the firm's leading scientists, many of whom have reputations as sexual philanderers. His investigation is soon complicated by a growing number of deaths, all men who died of congestive heart failure caused by "sexual exhaustion".

Faced with a rapidly escalating body count, the local sheriff, Captain Peters, holds a town meeting at which the laboratory's leading sex researcher, Henry Murger, urges the town populace to practice sexual abstinence – an idea greeted with derision by the locals. Neil and Julie arrange a meeting with Murger afterwards to discuss his theories as to the cause of his deaths, only to see him chased down and run over by a car with an unseen driver. While Agar is telephoning the agency, Julie is attacked and sexually assaulted by a group of local thugs, who are then beaten up by Agar on his return. During his investigation of Murger's home in search of clues, Neil discovers a secret room concealing sexual paraphernalia and Murger's gay lover, Joe, who informs Neil that he saw Murger driving off with an unknown woman prior to his death.

Despite a curfew and the establishment of a military quarantine, the scientists continue playing their sex games. One of them, Herb Kline, is approached by Susan Harris, a beautiful entomologist working on bees. Though described by the men as an "iceberg", she flirts with Kline and invites him over for dinner. That night, as they engage in sex, Kline suffers a fatal thrombosis and Harris reveals black compound eyes, suggesting that she is more than she seems to be.

Meanwhile, convinced there is a similar pattern at work, Neil begins studying the sexual patterns of insects. Seeking information about the mating habits of honey bees, he interrogates Dr. Harris at her lab; when he departs, she resumes her project – the transformation of Kline's wife Nora into a Bee Girl through a process of controlled mutation. With the aid of other previously mutated women, she cocoons Nora and places her in a chamber where she is swarmed by mutated honey bees; when she emerges, she is bombarded with radiation and awakens with the same black compound eyes and drive to mate that the other transformed women possess. The next morning, Herb Kline's body is discovered; when Captain Peters goes to inform Nora, she attempts unsuccessfully to seduce him.

Having worked out much of what has taken place, Neil summons the remaining department chairs and presents his theory. Though the geneticist, Stan Williams, scorns the idea, the head of the diagnostics department, Aldo Ferrara, is more receptive. At Grubowsky's funeral, Neil and Julie bring a radiation detector, which picks up the gamma radiation coming from the women in attendance who have been subjected to the treatment. Aware that they have been detected, the transformed women move to eliminate the remaining scientists; Williams is nearly killed by his now-mutated wife and Ferrara dies during a visit by Dr. Harris, who then lures Julie to her lab to be transformed.

When Neil discovers Ferrara's body, he realizes what the women are up to. Racing to the lab, he interrupts the women as they begin the process of turning Julie into one of them. With Harris threatening to kill Julie unless he leaves, he moves to depart, but pulls out a revolver instead and shoots the machinery. Neil then rescues Julie and bars the door, leaving the mutated women to die amidst a cascade of exploding machinery.

== Cast ==
- William Smith as Neil Agar
- Anitra Ford as Dr. Susan Harris
- Victoria Vetri as Julie Zorn
- Cliff Osmond as Captain Peters
- Wright King as Dr. Henry Murger
- Ben Hammer as Herb Kline
- Anna Aries as Nora Kline
- Andre Philippe as Aldo Ferrara
- Sid Kaiser as Stan Williams
- Katie Saylor as Gretchen Grubowsky
- Beverly Powers as Harriet Williams
- Tom Pittman as Harv
- Bill Keller as Joe
- Cliff Emmich as Coroner
- Al Bordighi as Herm
- Jack Perkins as Barney
- Danielle Dupont as Elvira Ferrara
- Rene Bond as Bee Lady

== Home media ==
The movie was released on DVD as Graveyard Tramps and featured on the compilation Stephen Romano Presents Shock Festival. Invasion of the Bee Girls was also released on DVD as part of a four-movie package called Four Cult Movie Marathon Volume 1.

Scream Factory released the movie on Blu-ray on April 4, 2017.

== Stage play ==
A semi-sequel to the movie, the play Beyond the Invasion of the Bee Girls was produced by House of Dames in 1998 in Seattle, Washington.

== See also ==
- List of American films of 1973
