= Tom Smith (make-up artist) =

British make-up artist (1920–2009)

- Born: 15 August 1920; UK
- Died: 3 April 2009 (aged 88); UK
- Occupation: Make-up artist
- Years active: 1950–1988

Tom Smith (15 August 1920 – 3 April 2009) was a British make-up artist who was nominated at the 1982 Academy Awards for Best Makeup for the film Gandhi. He was also known for the make-up in Raiders of the Lost Ark and Return of the Jedi.

He died of a heart attack on 3 April 2009 at the age of 88.

== Selected filmography ==
- Indiana Jones and the Temple of Doom (1984)
- Return of the Jedi (1983)
- Gandhi (1982)
- Raiders of the Lost Ark (1981)
- The Shining (1980)
- A Bridge Too Far (1977)
- The Land That Time Forgot (1975)
- Sleuth (1972)
- The Horror of Frankenstein (1970)
- Anne of the Thousand Days (1969)
- The Fearless Vampire Killers (1967)
- The Haunting (1963)
- Around the World in 80 Days (1956-uncredited)
