= Lucky Lady =

1975 film by Stanley Donen

- Theatrical poster by Richard Amsel
- Directed by: Stanley Donen
- Written by: Gloria Katz; Willard Huyck
- Produced by: Michael Gruskoff
- Starring: Liza Minnelli; Gene Hackman; Burt Reynolds
- Cinematography: Geoffrey Unsworth
- Edited by: Peter Boita
- Music by: Ralph Burns
- Production company: Gruskoff/Venture Films
- Distributed by: 20th Century Fox
- Release date: December 25, 1975
- Running time: 118 minutes
- Country: United States
- Language: English
- Budget: $12.1 million
- Box office: $24.4 million

Lucky Lady is a 1975 American comedy-drama film directed by Stanley Donen and starring Liza Minnelli, Gene Hackman, Burt Reynolds and Robby Benson. Its story takes place in 1930 during Prohibition in the United States.

== Plot ==
Late in the Prohibition era, Claire is an American living in Tijuana, Mexico. After her husband, who owned a dive bar, dies, she wants to return to the United States. Walker Ellis, a loser with whom she has long been having an affair, agrees to help wind up her business in Tijuana, which includes smuggling a last truckload of illegal Mexican immigrants across the border; this does not go according to plan, as the Border Patrol turn up and start shooting.

Walker is forced to go into business rum running across the border with Kibby Womack, one of those he was trying to smuggle across the border (as Kibby is also in trouble with the U.S. government). Instead of moving the goods overland, Walker hires Billy Mason to captain a sailboat to transport the contraband via water. While Billy is wise to the ways of the sea, he is unwise to the ways of the world. As Walker, Claire, Kibby, and Billy navigate the waters on this venture, they find two inherent risks. The first is the U.S. Coast Guard, led by the irritatingly officious Captain Moseley, who patrols these waters. Moseley and the Coast Guard can do nothing against vessels in international waters unless there is a sign of illegal cargo or a sale of illegal merchandise. Instead, Moseley works to "starve" rum runners, who can only sail up and down the coast, blocked from entering a U.S. port.

The second hazard is other rum runners. While the small players generally leave each other alone, the East Coast mob has sent Christie McTeague to establish a foothold then a stranglehold on the entire West Coast Mexico–U.S. trade. Through it all, Claire has convinced Kibby and an initially reluctant Walker that their three partner business should extend into the bedroom.

== Cast ==
- Liza Minnelli as Claire
- Gene Hackman as Kibby
- Burt Reynolds as Walker
- Robby Benson as Billy
- John Hillerman as McTeague
- Geoffrey Lewis as Coast Guard Captain Moseley
- Michael Hordern as Capt. Rockwell
- Anthony Holland as Mr. Tully
- John McLiam as Rass Huggins
- Val Avery as Dolph
- Louis Guss as Bernie
- William Bassett as Charley

== Production ==
=== Development ===
Katz and Huyck at the time were best known for writing American Graffiti. Before that film came out they were struggling writers, looking for an original project. While Huyck was in the Army reserves, Katz would go to the UCLA library "looking for anything for an idea." She came across an article in American Mercury magazine about rumrunners operating off Ensenada during Prohibition and, feeling that this background had never been used for a film before, started researching the period. When Huyck got out of the army they brought the idea to Mike Gruskoff, a producer, who liked the similarities to Butch Cassidy and the Sundance Kid and agreed to finance the duo writing a screenplay for $75,000

They worked on the script for six months. "It took us a long time to get our characters down," said Katz. "We tried it a lot of different ways. And we did a lot of research into the period and the language."

When they handed the script in, Gruskoff sold the film within eighteen hours to 20th Century Fox for $450,000, which was then a record amount for an original screenplay. This sale was helped by the fact that American Graffiti had since come out and been a huge success. "Mike Gruskoff was incredible, just incredible at selling a script," said Katz. "He got it immediately to the heads of the studios and he sold it very, very fast." The producer paid the writers $100,000 of the $450,000.

=== Director ===
The writers wanted Steven Spielberg to direct and he was interested but had made a commitment to do Jaws. Eventually Stanley Donen signed. Donen's fee was $600,000, Grusskoff's was $400,000. Katz said, "our reaction was, Stanley Donen seems so bizarre for this kind of film! Then we realized he's the ideal director because he is really a romantic director, and he can do this kind of character stuff and the kind of humor that the film has."

Once Donen came on board, some changes to the script were made. "Stanley wanted very much to play up the relationships, the menage-à-trois," said Huyck. "Which was fine with us. The script was probably overloaded with action since we wanted to sell it. Actually, action is boring to write. We have much more fun with dialogue." "Stanley's big emphasis to us is that you must love the characters," said Katz. "And any place he feels the characters are being lost, he wants us to put in something to develop the characters further. "

=== Casting ===
The writers said their inspiration for the lead characters were Jean Harlow, Clark Gable and Spencer Tracy.

It took 18 months for Donen to cast the film. Donen says this was due to problems with billing, pay and the fact the woman's role was central made it difficult to find male stars to play opposite her. "We thought the idea of three stars was a terrific notion because it would make Lucky Lady very salable and very castable," said Katz. "Ironically, it made it salable, but casting turned out to be a very big problem because one of the three stars was a woman. A lot of male actors didn't want to be in an ensemble piece or a piece with a woman as a strong character."

The only two female stars considered "bankable" at the time were Barbra Streisand and Liza Minnelli. Minnelli was the first star cast, for a minimum of $350,000. Donen originally wanted the male leads to be Paul Newman (who also wanted Spielberg to direct) and Warren Beatty, with production scheduled to begin in October 1974. However the stars could not be locked down and production was pushed back.

By November 1974, Burt Reynolds and George Segal were cast as the male leads. Huyck said Reynolds "didn't really like doing macho roles, he didn't want to play the tough guy role, he wanted the silly part." Reynolds' fee was reportedly $500,000, Segal's $750,000. Reynolds said it was "very important" the film was a success "since my last three films went down the tubes."

Segal later dropped out of the project and was quickly replaced with Gene Hackman. Hackman initially did not want to do the film, but 20th Century Fox kept offering him more and more money. Finally, Fox offered him $1.25 million, and according to talent agent Sue Mengers, "it was almost obscene for him not to do the film." "I was seduced," said Hackman.

=== Shooting ===
Filming began in Guaymas, Mexico in February 1975 and finished in July of that year. It was an exceedingly difficult shoot, compounded by the isolation of the location, poor weather, and the fact so much of it was shot on water. "I remember water," said Minnelli later. "For days. And shrimp. That's all we ate – shrimp. We were stranded. There was no TV, no radio, no American papers. The only way we knew what was going on away from the location was by telephone." "I will never make another film on water," said Donen later. "I can't tell you how painful it is." "I'm going bananas," said Hackman during the shoot. "The work is not satisfying."

The film went over budget to nearly $13 million. Other estimates put it as high as $22 million. The artist Lilly Fenichel served as the film's art director. Reynolds later recalled:

I loved Liza Minnelli and Gene Hackman, and I loved the Jack Lemmon kind of character I played, but there were times when I felt Stanley Donen was petrified and lost. Scared of the boats, scared of the explosions, of the gunshots. I'd look at him between takes and he'd be like this [crouching with hands over his head]. But the bedroom scene with the three of us was so beautifully done. I remember going to rushes and saying, "This is going to be a winner – it really works." It was a beautifully mounted picture, but the last forty minutes, the battle, was not his kind of film. Nobody knew what was happening and you didn't care for the characters.

=== New ending ===
In the original script, the two male leads were killed by government agents and the final scene happened ten years later with Liza Minnelli's character married to a boring businessman remembering the men she once loved. The writers said when they sold it, "The studio loved the script, and at that point no one objected to the ending."

"One of the first images in our minds when we began to work on the script was the ending," said Katz. "The idea of this woman remembering the two men she loved. We worked backwards from that. To us, the romance of the piece was in the idea of separation and loss.

Because the film was booked in for a Christmas release, Donen only had three months to edit the film. During this time Donen became concerned about the ending, feeling that the film had become much lighter than originally intended. He tried several different endings, including simply cutting off the final ten minutes. Donen eventually decided the film needed a happy ending and Fox agreed to finance a reshot scene. Because Minnelli was filming A Matter of Time in Rome, Donen, Hackman and Reynolds flew to Rome in November and filmed a new ending. This consisted of the three characters in bed together ten years later. Huyck and Katz wrote the scene, albeit reluctantly. "To us the original ending made a comment about the choices a woman has to make. But instead of making it the story of this woman, Stanley has made it a story of three people. That's valid. It's just different from what we originally intended."

Gareth Wigan, a Fox executive at the time, later recalled, "We previewed the movie nine times. The 2-hour, 30-minute version was wonderful. Burt Reynolds and Liza Minnelli died at the end and everything was set up for them to die. But market research told us they shouldn't die, so we started chopping a bit here, a bit there. We took the seriousness out. The only good preview we had was when the film broke, and Stanley Donen, the director, did a dance for the audience while it was being spliced."

It was decided that the new ending was not suitable, in part due to poor make up. So a third ending was used, which cut off the last ten minutes of the film. "We had four endings and none of them worked," claimed Donen later.

Reynolds and Minnelli both criticized the new ending, requesting that the studio show the three different endings to the press. Donen refused and since he had final cut the studio backed him. Donen called Minnelli an "emotional child" for this criticism. Minnelli also criticized Donen for taking "out the part that made you feel like the three of us are in peril. I saw the finished picture and I never once was afraid for us. Most of the serious moments were removed too."

== Release ==
The film opened on Christmas Day 1975.

=== Reception ===
Roger Ebert gave the film 2 stars out of 4 and called it "a big, expensive, good-looking flop of a movie; rarely is so much effort expended on a movie so inconsequential." Vincent Canby of The New York Times called the film "ridiculous without the compensation of being funny or fun. This is difficult to understand, considering the people who are involved." Pauline Kael of The New Yorker wrote, "This mercenaries' film is so coarsely conceived it obliterates any emotion, any art." Arthur D. Murphy of Variety called the film "strident, forced hokum. Stanley Donen's film caroms from one sequence to another with pointless abandon ... This is a major disappointment." Gene Siskel of the Chicago Tribune gave the film 2 stars out of 4 and stated, "There's an arrogance to this project I don't like. Apparently the filmmakers believed that the public would be sufficiently impressed with the antics of Gene, Liza, and Burt that it wouldn't care if the story made sense." Charles Champlin of the Los Angeles Times declared, "By squinting hard in the mind's eye, you can almost make out what it was that made 'Lucky Lady' seem worth doing. The movie we actually see is a cynical, vulgar, contrived, mismated, violent, uneven and uninteresting disaster." Gary Arnold of The Washington Post wrote, "If you were looking forward to an entertainment with a little class ... 'Lucky Lady' ... is likely to prove a resounding letdown. Despite all the big-time reputations involved, class is the last word that would spring to mind while one was watching the film."

Donen said "on the whole I thought the movie was fun, and it was pretty to look at."

On the review aggregator website Rotten Tomatoes, 25% of 12 critics' reviews are positive.

=== Box office ===
The film grossed $2,265,103 in its opening weekend (Thursday to Sunday) from 213 cities. It went on to earn theatrical rentals of $12.1 million in the United States and Canada.

According to Donen the film made a profit. However the director says there's "no doubt" the film "hurt me professionally. It was looked on as a huge failure. And it hurt me personally because of some of the things Liza and Reynolds said to the media."

=== Home media ===
The film went unreleased on DVD until February 1, 2011, via Shout! Factory.

== Additional information ==
This film was also released under the following titles:

- Abenteurer auf der Lucky Lady – West Germany
- Belali sevgili – Turkey
- I tyheri kyria – Greece (transliterated ISO-LATIN-1 title)
- In 3 sul Lucky Lady – Italy
- Los aventureros de Lucky Lady – Spain
- Oh, vilket sjöslag! – Sweden
- Os aventureiros de Lucky Lady – Brazil (TV title)
- Tre smarte smuglere på 'Lucky Lady' – Denmark
- Uma Mulher dos Diabos – Portugal (imdb display title)
- Una dama con suerte – Venezuela
- Viskiseikkailu Lucky Ladyllä – Finland

== Soundtrack ==
- "Empty Bed Blues" – Written by J.C. Johnson, Performed by Bessie Smith
- "Ain't Misbehavin'" – Music by Fats Waller and Harry Brooks, Lyrics by Andy Razaf, Performed by Burt Reynolds
- "A Hot Time in the Old Town" – Music by Theo. A. Metz, Lyrics by Joe Hayden, Performed by Bessie Smith
- "(Get) While the Getting is Good" – Written by John Kander and Fred Ebb, Performed by Liza Minnelli
- "Lucky Lady Montage" – Written by John Kander and Fred Ebb, Performed by Liza Minnelli
- "Lucky Lady (reprise)" – Written by John Kander and Fred Ebb, Performed by Liza Minnelli

== Novelization ==
A month before the release of the film, Bantam Books issued a tie-in novelization of the screenplay by historical fiction writer Cecelia Holland under the pseudonym "Julia Rood." It achieved some minor notoriety at the time for retaining the original ending, which reflected the earlier draft script from which Holland worked.
