= Nicholas Georgiade =

American film and television actor (1933–2021)

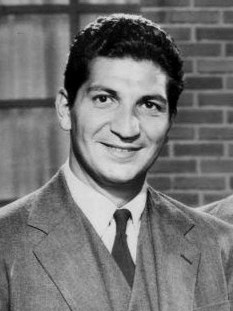
- Georgiade in 1960
- Born: March 25, 1933; New York City, New York, U.S.
- Died: December 19, 2021 (aged 88); Las Vegas, Nevada, U.S.
- Occupation: Actor
- Years active: 1958–2007
- Spouses: Anita Khanzadian (m. 1956, divorced) Davee Decker (m. 1964; div. 1967) Alicia Razaf (m. 1977; died 2017)
- Children: 1

Nicholas Georgiade (March 25, 1933 – December 19, 2021) was an American film and television actor, best known for playing Agent Rico Rossi in the television series The Untouchables.

== Early life and education ==
Georgiade was born in New York City on March 25, 1933, of Greek ancestry. After serving four years with the U.S. Army in Berlin, he attended Syracuse University, where he was a heavyweight boxer for three years. Intending to become a teacher, he majored in sociology and psychology, and graduated 1956. Lucille Ball discovered him when he acted in a little theatre production in Hollywood, which led to his participation in the Desilu Workshop theater.

== Career ==
Television

Georgiade's career in television began on the December 11, 1958 Playhouse 90 episode titled Seven Against the Wall, about the Saint Valentine's Day Massacre, featuring actors Warren Oates, Tige Andrews, and Paul Lambert.

In April 1959, he made an appearance as Frank Kotter, who is caught during a brewery raid on the CBS anthology, Westinghouse Desilu Playhouse in the episode, "The Untouchables: Part 1" which serves as the pilot for the ABC series of the same name. Georgiade's best-known role is Federal Agent Enrico "Rico" Rossi on 105 episodes of the 1959-1963 hit program, The Untouchables.

Also on Westinghouse Desilu Playhouse, he played Tommy on the January 23, 1960 episode Meeting at Appalachia which included Cameron Mitchell and Jack Warden. Other appearances were on such notable programs as Hawaiian Eye (1959), Daniel Boone (1966), I Spy (1966), Batman (1967), Hawaii Five-O (1970), The Rockford Files (1976), Kojak (1978), and The Equalizer (1987).

Film

In theatrical films, he had a small uncredited role as a police detective in It's a Mad, Mad, Mad, Mad World (1963). He also had a brief uncredited appearance as a prisoner in Hang 'Em High. Georgiade had roles in The Young Runaways (1968), Stacey (1973), Seven (1979), Mugsy's Girls (1985), Picasso Trigger (1988) and Indecent Proposal (1993).

From May 2016 until his death, Georgiade was the last living regular cast member of The Untouchables, as well as one of two surviving cast members of It's a Mad, Mad, Mad, Mad World, the other being Barrie Chase.

== Personal life and death ==
Georgiade married Anita Khanzadian in 1956, whilst he was a senior in college. In 1964, he remarried after meeting New York model, Davee Decker, who was then 28. In 1977, he married Alicia Razaf, who was 18 years his senior. They remained married until her death in January 2017, at the age of 102.

He died in Las Vegas on December 19, 2021, at the age of 88. He was survived by his daughter, Anastazia Juliet Georgiade.

== Filmography ==
=== Film ===
- 1963: It's a Mad, Mad, Mad, Mad World – Detective at Grogan's Crash Site (uncredited)
- 1968: The Young Runaways – Driver
- 1973: Stacey – Matthew
- 1979: Seven – Niko
- 1985: Mugsy's Girls (aka Delta Pi) – Cupcake
- 1988: Picasso Trigger – Schiavo
- 1993: Indecent Proposal – Croupler

=== Television ===
Nicholas Georgiade television credits
Year	Title	Role	Notes	Ref.
1958	Playhouse 90	Rocco	Episode: "Seven Against the Wall" (S3.E11)	
1958	Whirlybirds	Anders	1 episode	
1959	Hawaiian Eye	Kala	1 episode	
1960	Westinghouse Desilu Playhouse	Frank Kotter	Episode: "The Untouchables: Part 1" (S1.E20)	
1959	The Untouchables	Frank Kotter (uncredited)	Episode: "Pilot"	
1959–1963	The Untouchables	Agent Enrico "Rico" Rossi	Main cast	
1960	Westinghouse Desilu Playhouse	Tommy	Episode: "Meeting at Appalachia" (S2.E11)	
1963	Combat!	Londos	1 episode	
1966	I Spy	1st Guard	1 episode	
1966	Daniel Boone	Chief White Wolf	1 episode	
1966	Run, Buddy, Run	Mobster	Episode: "Steam Bath & Chicken Little"	
1966	Run, Buddy, Run	Wendell	3 episodes	
1967	Batman	Kayo	1 episode	
1968	Mannix	Logan	2 episodes: "Deadfall", "Deadfall: Part II"	
1970	Hawaii Five-O	Andreas	1 episode	
1970	Get Smart	Marcus	5 episode	
1976	The Rockford Files	Danny	1 episode	
1978	Kojak	Gino	1 episode	
1978–1982	Quincy, M.E.	Andros / Lew Malloy / Bob Gooden / Vince Lasker	4 episodes	
1987	The Equalizer	FBI Agent #2	Episode: "Blood and Wine (Part 1)" (S3.E1)	
