= Bill L. Norton =

American film and television director

- Born: August 13, 1943 (age 83)
- Occupations: Film and television director, writer, and producer
- Spouse: Rosanna Norton (m. 1967; div. 1979)
- Father: William W. Norton

Bill L. Norton (born August 13, 1943) is an American film and television director, writer, and producer. Among many projects, he is the writer-director of the films Cisco Pike (1971) and More American Graffiti (1979).

== Life and career ==
Norton is most notable as a film director, including his first feature film, Cisco Pike in 1971, which he also wrote. He worked as a screenwriter in the 1970s and '80s, writing the scripts for Convoy and Outlaw Blues, among other films.

He also has directed many television series, among them Buffy the Vampire Slayer, Angel, John Doe, Hack, Las Vegas, Law & Order: Criminal Intent, Lincoln Heights and Roswell.

He was married to costume designer Rosanna Norton. He is the son of screenwriter William W. Norton, who was convicted in 1986 of importing arms to Northern Ireland for the IRA and the INLA.

Sometimes, he is credited as B.W.L. Norton, Bill Norton or William Lloyd Norton.

== Filmography ==
=== Films ===
Year	Title	Director	Writer
1964	How to Succeed with Girls	No	Yes
1971	Cisco Pike	Yes	Yes
1977	Outlaw Blues	No	Yes
1978	Convoy	No	Yes
1979	More American Graffiti	Yes	Yes
1982	Losin' It	No	Yes
1985	Baby: Secret of the Lost Legend	Yes	No
1987	Back to the Beach	No	Story
1987	Three for the Road	Yes	No

Other credits
Year	Title	Role
1965	Girl Happy	Uncredited camera operator
1966	The Chase	Uncredited camera operator
1966	The Fortune Cookie	Uncredited camera operator
1973	Messiah of Evil	Actor

=== Television ===
As Director
Title	Year(s)	Episode	Notes
Gargoyles	1972	—N/a	TV movie
The Twilight Zone	1985-1986	"Teacher's Aide"	
The Twilight Zone	1985-1986	''Monsters!"	
Tour of Duty	1987-1989	''Pilot''	Also co-executive producer
Tour of Duty	1987-1989	''Notes from the Underground''	Also writer & co-executive producer
Tour of Duty	1987-1989	''Brothers, Fathers, and Sons''	Also writer & co-executive producer
Tour of Duty	1987-1989	''Battling Baker Brothers''	Also writer & co-executive producer
Tour of Duty	1987-1989	''Pushin' Too Hard''	Also co-executive producer
Tour of Duty	1987-1989	''Soldiers''	Also co-executive producer
Tour of Duty	1987-1989	''Angel of Mercy''	Also co-executive producer
Tour of Duty	1987-1989	''Saigon: Part 1''	
Tour of Duty	1987-1989	''Saigon: Part 2"	
Tour of Duty	1987-1989	''Popular Forces''	
Grand Slam	1990	''Grand Slam''	
Grand Slam	1990	''Chop Shop''	
Angel of Death	1990	—N/a	TV movies
False Arrest	1991	—N/a	TV movies
The Boys of Twilight	1992	"A Bend in the River"	
Crossroads	1992	Unknown episodes	
Seaquest DSV	1993	''Brothers and Sisters''	
Seaquest DSV	1993	''Give Me Liberte''	
Hercules: The Legendary	1994	''Hercules and the Amazon Women''	
Hercules: The Legendary	1994	''Hercules in the Underworld''	
The Women of Spring Break	1995	—N/a	TV movies
Deadly Whispers	1995	—N/a	TV movies
Stolen Innocence	1995	—N/a	TV movies
Gone in the Night	1996	—N/a	TV movies
Them	1996	—N/a	TV movies
Vows of Deception	1996	—N/a	TV movies
A Deadly Vision	1997	—N/a	TV movies
Our Mother's Murder	1997	—N/a	TV movies
Bad to the Bone	1997	—N/a	TV movies
Every Mother's Worst Fear	1998	—N/a	TV movies
Thirst	1998	—N/a	TV movies
Vengeance Unlimited	1998-1999	''Justice''	
Vengeance Unlimited	1998-1999	''Legalese''	
Sons of Thunder	1999	''Moment of Truth''	
A Crime of Passion	1999	—N/a	TV movie
Profiler	2000	''Quid Pro Quo''	
Profiler	2000	''Pianissimo''	
The Fugitive	2000	''Sanctuary''	
Roswell	2000-2001	''The End of the World''	
Roswell	2000-2001	''Control''	
FreakyLinks	2001	''Subject: Sunrise at Sunset Streams''	
The Invisible Man	2001	''Going Postal''	
The Invisible Man	2001	''Den of Thieves''	
The Invisible Man	2001	''Flash to Bang''	
Angel	2001-2003	''Happy Anniversary''	
Angel	2001-2003	''That Vision Thing''	
Angel	2001-2003	''Provider''	
Angel	2001-2003	''Supersymmetry''	
Angel	2001-2003	''Calvary''	
Angel	2001-2003	''Life of the Party''	
Buffy the Vampire Slayer	2002	''Two to Go''	
Pasadena	2002	''Someone to Talk To''	
Haunted	2002	''Last Call''	
John Doe	2002	''Past Imperfect''	
Hack	2003	''Sinners and Saints''	
The Guardian	2004	''Amends''	
The Guardian	2004	''Remember''	
Medium	2005	''Coded''	
Medium	2005	''A Priest, a Doctor and a Medium Walk Into an Execution Chamber''	
Threshold	2005	''Pulse''	
Ghost Whisperer	2005	''Hope and Mercy''	
Law & Order: Criminal Intent	2005-2006	''Ex Stasis''	
Law & Order: Criminal Intent	2005-2006	''Slither''	
Law & Order: Criminal Intent	2005-2006	''Country Crossover''	
The Unit	2006-2009	''Unannounced''	
The Unit	2006-2009	''Silver Star''	
The Unit	2006-2009	''Two Coins''	
The Unit	2006-2009	''Inside Out''	
The Unit	2006-2009	''Bad Beat''	
Heartland	2007	''Picking Up Little Things''	
Lincoln Heights	2007-2009	''Missing''	
Lincoln Heights	2007-2009	''The Old Man and the G''	
Lincoln Heights	2007-2009	''Ode to Joy''	
Lincoln Heights	2007-2009	''Persons of Interest''	
Las Vegas	2008	''Three Weddings and a Funeral: Part 1''	
Generation Gap	2008	—N/a	TV movie

As Producer only
Title	Year(s)	Episode	Notes
Tour of Duty	1987-1988	''Dislocations''	Co-executive producer
Tour of Duty	1987-1988	''War Lover''	Co-executive producer
Tour of Duty	1987-1988	''Sitting Ducks''	Co-executive producer
Tour of Duty	1987-1988	''Burn Baby, Burn''	Co-executive producer
Tour of Duty	1987-1988	''The Good, the Bad, and the Dead''	Co-executive producer
Tour of Duty	1987-1988	''Nowhere to Run''	Co-executive producer
Tour of Duty	1987-1988	''Roadrunner''	Co-executive producer
Tour of Duty	1987-1988	''USO Down''	Co-executive producer
Tour of Duty	1987-1988	''Under Siege''	Co-executive producer
Tour of Duty	1987-1988	''Gray-Brown Odyssey''	Co-executive producer
Tour of Duty	1987-1988	''Blood Brothers''	Co-executive producer
Tour of Duty	1987-1988	''The Short Timer''	Co-executive producer
Tour of Duty	1987-1988	''Paradise Lost''	Co-executive producer
Tour of Duty	1987-1988	''The Hill''	Co-executive producer
Grand Slam	1990	''Who's Crazy?''	Executive producer

=== Video game ===
- Law & Order: Criminal Intent (2005, director)
