= 1973 New York Film Critics Circle Awards =

39th New York Film Critics Circle Awards

39th New York Film Critics Circle Awards

January 27, 1974
(announced January 3, 1974)

Best Picture:
Day for Night

The 39th New York Film Critics Circle Awards, 27 January 1974, honored the best filmmaking of 1973.

== Winners ==
- Best Actor:
  - Marlon Brando - Last Tango in Paris (Ultimo tango a Parigi)
  - Runner-up: Al Pacino - Serpico
- Best Actress:
  - Joanne Woodward - Summer Wishes, Winter Dreams
  - Runner-up: Glenda Jackson - A Touch of Class
- Best Director:
  - François Truffaut - Day for Night (La nuit américaine)
  - Runner-up: Costa-Gavras - State of Siege (État de siège)
- Best Film:
  - Day for Night (La nuit américaine)
  - Runners-up: American Graffiti and Last Tango in Paris (Ultimo tango a Parigi)
- Best Screenplay:
  - George Lucas, Gloria Katz and Willard Huyck - American Graffiti
- Best Supporting Actor:
  - Robert De Niro - Mean Streets
  - Runner-up: John Houseman - The Paper Chase
- Best Supporting Actress:
  - Valentina Cortese - Day for Night (La nuit américaine)
