= Radioland Murders =

- Theatrical release poster
- Directed by: Mel Smith
- Screenplay by: Willard Huyck; Gloria Katz; Jeff Reno; Ron Osborn
- Story by: George Lucas
- Produced by: George Lucas; Rick McCallum; Fred Roos
- Starring: Mary Stuart Masterson; Brian Benben; Ned Beatty; Scott Michael Campbell; Michael Lerner; Michael McKean; Jeffrey Tambor; Stephen Tobolowsky; Christopher Lloyd
- Cinematography: David Tattersall
- Edited by: Paul Trejo
- Music by: Joel McNeely
- Production company: Lucasfilm Ltd.
- Distributed by: Universal Pictures
- Release date: October 21, 1994
- Running time: 108 minutes
- Country: United States
- Language: English
- Budget: $15 million
- Box office: $1.3 million

Radioland Murders is a 1994 American comedy thriller film directed by Mel Smith and executive produced by George Lucas from a story by Lucas. Radioland Murders is set in the 1939 atmosphere of old-time radio and pays homage to the screwball comedy films of the 1930s. The film tells the story of writer Roger Henderson trying to settle relationship issues with his wife Penny while dealing with a whodunit murder mystery in a radio station. It is a prequel to the film American Graffiti (1973).

The film stars an ensemble cast, including Brian Benben, Mary Stuart Masterson, Scott Michael Campbell, Michael Lerner and Ned Beatty. Radioland Murders also features numerous small roles and cameo appearances, including Michael McKean, Bobcat Goldthwait, Jeffrey Tambor, Christopher Lloyd, George Burns (in his final film appearance), Billy Barty and Rosemary Clooney.

George Lucas began development for the film in the 1970s, originally attached as director for Willard Huyck and Gloria Katz's script, from a story by Lucas. Universal Pictures commenced pre-production and both Steve Martin and Cindy Williams had already been approached for the two leads before Radioland Murders languished in development hell for over 20 years. In 1993, Lucas told Universal that advances in computer-generated imagery from Industrial Light & Magic (owned by Lucasfilm), particularly in digital mattes, would help bring Radioland Murders in for a relatively low budget of about $10 million, which eventually rose to $15 million. Mel Smith was hired to direct and filming lasted from October to December 1993. Radioland Murders was released on October 21, 1994, to negative reviews from critics and bombed at the box office, only grossing $1.3 million in the United States.

== Plot ==
In 1939, a new radio network based at station WBN in Chicago, Illinois, begins its inaugural night. The station's owner, General Walt Whalen, depends on his employees to impress main sponsor Bernie King. This includes writer Roger Henderson, assistant director Penny Henderson (Roger's wife, seeking divorce), page boy Billy Budget, engineer Max Applewhite, conductor Rick Rochester, announcer Dexter Morris, director Walt Whalen Jr. and stage manager Herman Katzenback. After King commissions rewrites on the radio scripts, the WBN writers get angry, complaining that they have not been paid in weeks.

When trumpet player Ruffles Reedy falls dead from rat poisoning, a series of events ensue. Director Walt Jr. is hanged (the mysterious killer makes it look like a suicide), and his father, the General, has the Chicago Police Department (CPD) get involved to solve the murder mysteries as the nightly radio performance continues. Katzenback is killed after attempting to fix the main stage when the machinery malfunctions. Penny is appointed stage manager and director due to Walt Jr. and Katzenback's deaths. Roger tries to solve the killings, which greatly annoys the police, led by Lieutenant Cross.

Because Roger unfortunately appears at every crime scene just as the murders take place, he is ruled as the prime suspect. Roger and Billy then theorize that Dexter is the next to die. Dexter ignores their warning and is fatally electrocuted. By going through private documents in WBN's file room, Roger finds that the victims all previously worked together at a radio station in Peoria, Illinois, which he then correlates into a secretive FCC scandal. King (laughing gas) and General Whalen (falls down an elevator shaft) are the next to die after Roger's warning, making the police even more suspicious.

After escaping custody, Roger uses Billy to communicate and send scripts to Penny. When rewriting one of the programs, Gork: Son of Fire, Roger attempts to write the script with self-referential events, proving to everyone that the mysterious killer is Max. Max explains that his killings were a revenge scheme that dealt with stockholders and patents, explicitly detailing his invention of television, which other scientists have copied. Max takes Roger and Penny atop the radio tower at gunpoint, but is eventually killed when a biplane shows up and guns him down. Impressed by the nightly performance, the sponsors decide to fund WBN. Roger and Penny reconcile their complex relationship and choose not to divorce.

== Cast ==
- Mary Stuart Masterson as Penny Henderson, the General's secretary, who seems to function as an assistant director.
- Brian Benben as Roger Henderson, a writer at WBN and Penny's estranged husband.

=== Station staff ===
- Ned Beatty as General Walt Whalen, the owner of WBN
- Scott Michael Campbell as Billy Budget, a page, who keeps attempting to break out of it.
- Jennifer Dundas as Deirdre
- Brion James as Bernie King, the station's main sponsor
- Leighann Lord as Morgana, a janitor who helps the writers and Zoltan
- Larry Miller as Herman Katzenback, the German station manager of WBN
- Jeffrey Tambor as Walt Whalen Jr., the General's toupéed son and the show director
- Stephen Tobolowsky as Max Applewhite, the station's sound engineer
- Robert Walden as Tommy, a control room worker

=== Writers ===
- Anne De Salvo as the female writer
- Bobcat Goldthwait as the wild writer
- Robert Klein as the dad writer
- Harvey Korman as Jules Cogley
- Peter MacNicol as the son writer

=== Performers ===
- Billy Barty as himself
- Corbin Bernsen as Dexter Morris, the station's announcer
- George Burns as Milt Lackey, a centenarian comedian
- Tracy Byrd as himself
- Rosemary Clooney as Anna, a singer
- Ellen Albertini Dow as the organist
- Joey Lawrence as Frankie Marshall, a singer
- Christopher Lloyd as Zoltan, the eccentric foley artist
- Michael McKean as Rick Rochester, the station's band conductor
- Anita Morris as Claudette Katzenback, the station's star singer and Herman's wife
- Bridgett Newton, Amy Parrish, and Nina Repeta as The Miller Sisters, a close harmony trio
- Jack Sheldon as Ruffles Reed, the band's trumpeter

=== Others ===
- Michael Lerner as Lieutenant Cross, a short-tempered policeman who believes Roger is the murderer
- Dylan Baker as Detective Jasper, Cross' idiot assistant
- Candy Clark and Bo Hopkins as Billy's parents

According to George Lucas, Penny and Roger later becomes the mother and father of Curt Henderson, Laurie Henderson, and Andy Henderson from the films American Graffiti (1973) and More American Graffiti (1979). An older Penny and older Roger cameos at the end of American Graffiti. Candy Clark and Bo Hopkins appeared in both American Graffiti movies as Debbie Dunham and Joe "Little Joe" Young. However, no connection is made between Debbie, Little Joe, and the characters in Radioland Murders.

== Production ==
=== Development ===
The genesis of Radioland Murders came from executive producer/co-writer George Lucas's obsession with old-time radio. Lucas conceived the storyline of the film during the writing phase of American Graffiti, viewing it as a homage to the various Abbott and Costello films, primarily Who Done It (1942), in which Abbott and Costello star as Chick Larkin and Mervin Q. Milgrim, two soda jerks solving a murder in a radio station. Radioland Murders also shares some inspiration from The Big Clock (1948). When Universal Pictures accepted American Graffiti in 1972, Lucas also allowed the studio first-look deals for both Radioland Murders and an untitled science fiction film (which eventually became the basis for Star Wars).

Lucas eventually negotiated a deal to produce Radioland Murders for Universal shortly after the successful release of American Graffiti in late 1973. Willard Huyck and Gloria Katz prepared a rough draft based on Lucas's 1974 film treatment, and Universal was confident enough to announce pre-production soon after. Lucas was set to direct with Gary Kurtz producing. In the original Huyck/Katz script, Roger Henderson and Penny were not a married couple seeking divorce, but were boyfriend and girlfriend with a love-hate relationship. Their script also included the controversy over the invention of radio.

In July 1978, Lucas revealed that Radioland Murders was still in development, and that both Steve Martin and Cindy Williams were approached for the two leads. The script was being rewritten and the planned start date was early 1979. However, throughout the 1970s to early 1990s, Radioland Murders remained in development hell. Between this time, Lucas commissioned Theodore J. Flicker to perform a rewrite. In early 1993 Lucas told Universal that advances in computer-generated imagery from Industrial Light & Magic (owned by Lucasfilm), particularly in digital mattes, would help bring Radioland Murders in for a relatively low budget of about $10 million, which eventually rose to $15 million.

=== Pre-production ===
Universal agreed in 1993 to greenlight Radioland Murders if Lucas would modify the script. The original Huyck/Katz script might have been appreciated by older filmgoers back in 1972, but Universal wanted it modified "for an audience accustomed to parodies like Mel Brooks's Spaceballs." Based on Ron Howard's recommendation, Lucas hired Jeff Reno and Ron Osborn (known for their work on Moonlighting) to "update" the screenplay. The shooting script was prepared by Lucas, who combined his favorite elements of the Reno/Osborn draft with the original Huyck/Katz script from the 1970s. Lucas then hired Mel Smith to direct, who recommended Brian Benben for the lead role. Lucas specifically chose Smith because he believed the British comedian/filmmaker could handle Radioland Murders' form of slapstick comedy and dark humor. Universal was adamant that the ensemble cast be filled with then-popular TV stars of the early 1990s. Christopher Lloyd agreed to make a small appearance as the eccentric sound designer Zoltan on the agreement that all of his scenes were shot in one day.

=== Filming ===
Principal photography for Radioland Murders began on October 28, 1993 at Carolco Studios in Wilmington, North Carolina. Brief filming also took place at Hollywood Center Studios. Production designer Gavin Bocquet (Star Wars prequels, Young Indiana Jones, Stardust) disguised the film's limited rooms in a beehivelike structure. Larger areas, notably the exterior of the building and the transmission tower on the roof, were created or augmented with digital mattes added by visual effects supervisor Scott Squires (The Lost World: Jurassic Park, Star Wars: Episode I – The Phantom Menace) at Industrial Light & Magic. Following a break, in which Lucas, director Mel Smith and editor Paul Trejo reviewed the footage using the new digital Avid Technology editing system (the successor to EditDroid), the cast and crew were reassembled for a further two weeks of filming. Principal photography for Radioland Murders ended on December 23, 1993. There were over 100 visual effects shots in the film. According to Michael McKean, the last days of production were rough in getting as many shots and inserts done as possible, with Smith and Lucas each directing units simultaneously to go with 24-hour days for a film he later labeled as “cinematic pickup sticks… they just spilled it out onto the carpet.”

== Release ==
To market Radioland Murders, Universal attached a film trailer to The Flintstones in May 1994. The studio believed both films would specifically appeal to the Baby Boom Generation. Radioland Murders was originally set to be theatrically released in September 1994 before it was pushed back. The film was released in the United States on October 21, 1994, in 844 theaters, only grossing $1.37 million. Ultimately the film bombed at the box office and did not recoup its $15 million budget. It ranks among the top ten widely released films for having the biggest second weekend drop at the box office, dropping 78.5% from $835,570 to $179,315.

=== Critical reception ===
Radioland Murders received negative reviews with Rotten Tomatoes calculating a 32% approval rating based on 19 reviews collected. Roger Ebert criticized the film for containing too much slapstick comedy instead of subtle humor. Although he praised the art direction and visual effects, Ebert believed "the movie just doesn't work. It's all action and no character, all situation and no comedy. The slapstick starts so soon and lasts so long that we don't have an opportunity to meet or care about the characters in a way that would make their actions funny." Richard Schickel, writing in Time magazine gave a mixed review, mainly criticizing the film for its fast pacing. Caryn James of The New York Times dismissed the film for trying too hard to pay homage to screwball comedy films of the 1930s.

Mick LaSalle of the San Francisco Chronicle gave a mixed reaction, feeling the filmmakers failed in attempting to woo audiences with nostalgia. Internet reviewer James Berardinelli called the film a "horrible concoction synthesizing elements of The Hudsucker Proxy and Brain Donors, and setting them in the world of David Lynch's On the Air. This film has more gags in it than anything this side of a Zucker, Abrahams and Zucker production, too few of which work."

=== Year-end lists ===
- 1st worst – Michael Mills, The Palm Beach Post
- 1st worst – Stephen Hunter, The Baltimore Sun
- 4th worst – Desson Howe, The Washington Post
- Top 10 worst (listed alphabetically, not ranked) – William Arnold, Seattle Post-Intelligencer
- Top 10 worst (listed alphabetically, not ranked) – Mike Mayo, The Roanoke Times
- #9 Worst - Michael Medved, Sneak Previews

=== Home media ===
The first Region 1 DVD release came in March 1998 by Image Entertainment. Universal Studios Home Entertainment re-released the film on DVD in August 2006. Universal Studios Home Entertainment released the film on Blu-ray on August 13, 2019 ahead of its 25th anniversary. Kino Lorber released the film on Blu-ray on October 21, 2025.

== See also ==
- Danger on the Air, a 1938 mystery-comedy film set in a radio station
- Up in the Air, a 1940 mystery-comedy film set in a radio station
- Who Done It?, a 1942 mystery-comedy film set in a radio station
