= Anitra Ford =

American former actress and model

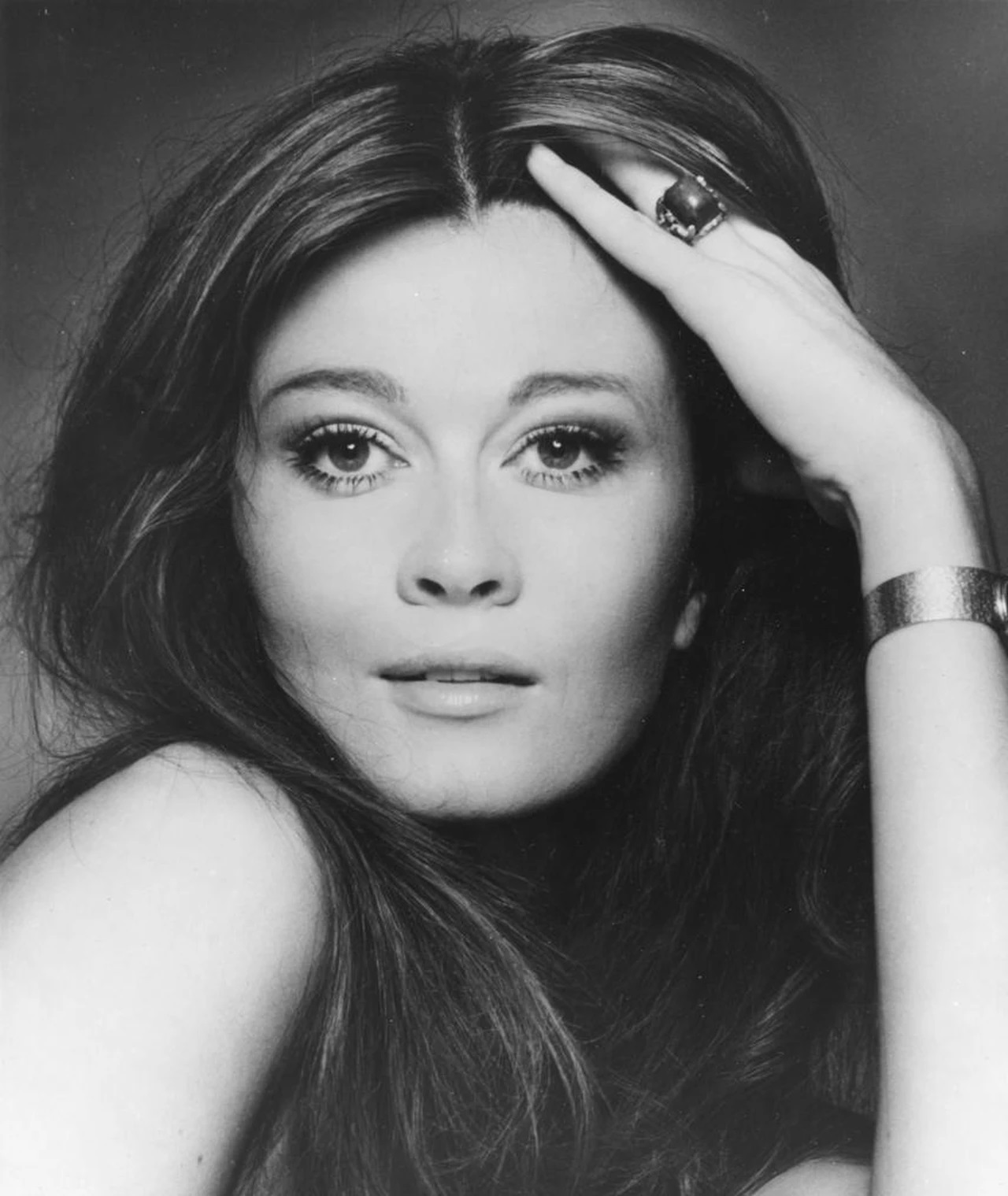
- Ford in 1976
- Born: 1942 (age 83–84)
- Occupations: Actress, model
- Years active: 1966–1977
- Known for: The Price Is Right

Anitra Ford (born 1942) is an American former actress and former model. She is best known for her work as a model from 1972 to 1976 on the CBS daytime and syndicated nighttime game show The Price Is Right starring Bob Barker (CBS) and Dennis James (syndication).

Ford's mother acted in summer stock theater productions, and her father was a jazz musician. After she graduated from high school, she became a model.

Ford's first modeling assignment was a swimsuit spread for Life magazine that featured her on the cover. Her film appearances included The Love Machine (1971), Where Does It Hurt? (1972), The Big Bird Cage (1972), Invasion of the Bee Girls (1973), Messiah of Evil (1973), Stacey (1973), Wonder Woman (1974), Dirty O'Neil (1974) and The Longest Yard (1974), and she appeared in episodes of the television programs Banacek, S.W.A.T., Mannix and Starsky and Hutch, as Hutch's girlfriend Molly.

She also appeared on a 2018 episode of the TV game show To Tell The Truth in which she played the contestant who was indeed telling the truth about being a former model on The Price Is Right. She also appeared on Match Game in 1976 as guest panelist for a single week.

== Filmography ==
Year	Title	Role	Notes
1966	The Oscar	Party Guest (uncredited)	
1970	The Odd Couple	Jeannie	Season 1 Episode 11: "Felix Is Missing"
1971	The Love Machine	Model (uncredited)	
1971	Columbo	Woman at Theatre (uncredited)	Season 1 Episode 1: "Murder by the Book"
1971	Love, American Style	Brunette	Season 3 Episode 4: "segment: Love and the Television Weekend"
1971	Mannix	Chris	Season 5 Episode 6: "Days Beyond Recall"
1971	Monty Nash	Hotel Clerk	Season 1 Episode 8: "The Visitor"
1972	The Big Bird Cage	Terry	
1972	Where Does It Hurt?	Nurse at Reception Desk	
1972	Banacek	Susan	Season 1 Episode 1: "Let's Hear It for a Living Legend"
1972-76	The Price is Right	Model	
1973	Search	Miss Lewis	Season 1 Episode 14: "The 24 Carat Hit"
1973	Stacey	Tish Chambers	
1973	Invasion of the Bee Girls	Dr. Susan Harris	
1974	Wonder Woman	Ahnjayla	TV Movie
1974	Dirty O'Neil	Kyote Passenger	
1974	The Longest Yard	Melissa	
1974	Messiah of Evil	Laura	
1975	Baretta	Cecilia	Season 1 Episode 8: "Walk Like You Talk"
1975	The Streets of San Francisco	Mildred Parker	Season 4 Episode 4: "Men Will Die"
1975	S.W.A.T.	Gloria / Peggy	2 episodes
1975–1977	Starsky and Hutch	Molly / Silky	2 episodes
1977	We've Got Each Other	Model	Season 1 Episode 1: Pilot

== See also ==
- The Price Is Right models
