= Candy Clark =

American actress (born 1947)

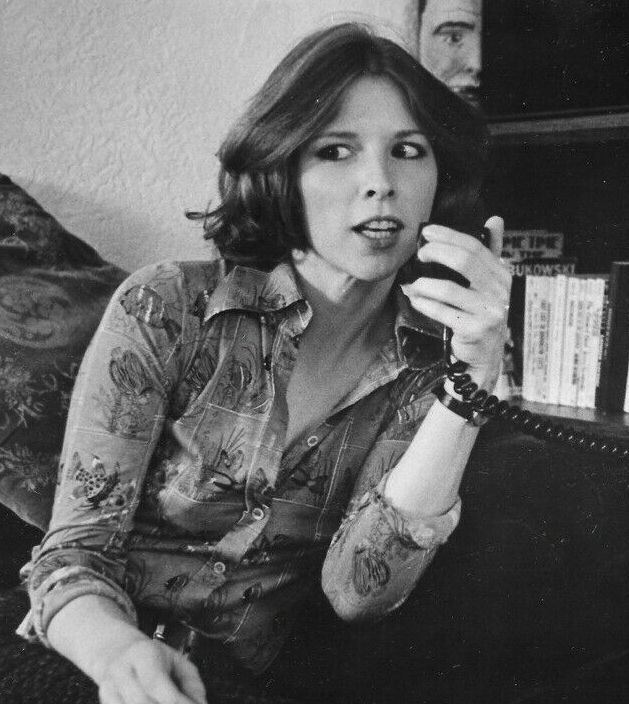
- Clark in Handle with Care (1977)
- Born: Candace June Clark; June 20, 1947 (age 79); Norman, Oklahoma, U.S.
- Education: Green B. Trimble Technical High School
- Occupations: Actress; model
- Years active: 1972–present
- Known for: American Graffiti; Blue Thunder; The Man Who Fell to Earth
- Spouses: Marjoe Gortner (m. 1978; div. 1979) Jeff Wald (m. 1987; div. 1988)

Candace June Clark (born June 20, 1947) is an American actress and model. She is best known for her role as Debbie Dunham in the 1973 film American Graffiti, for which she received a nomination for the Academy Award for Best Supporting Actress at the 46th Academy Awards, and her role as Mary-Lou in the 1976 film The Man Who Fell to Earth.

== Early life ==
Clark was born in Norman, Oklahoma, to Ella (née Padberg) and Thomas Clark, a chef. She grew up in Fort Worth, Texas and attended Green B. Trimble Technical High School.

== Career ==
Clark's first acting role was the role of Andrea Martin in "The Witch of Whitman High", season 3 episode 21 of the television series Room 222 in 1972, then as the character of Faye Murdock in John Huston's film Fat City (1972). She also starred or acted in American Graffiti (1973), The Man Who Fell to Earth (1976), The Big Sleep (1978), More American Graffiti (1979), Q (1982), Blue Thunder (1983), Amityville 3-D (1983), Cat's Eye (1985) and At Close Range (1986) and played the role of Francine Hewitt in The Blob (1988). She appeared in a very small role as Buffy Summers (Kristy Swanson)'s mom Joyce in Buffy The Vampire Slayer (1992). She appeared in the 2009 film The Informant! as the mother of Mark Whitacre, played by Matt Damon. In 2011, Clark went to Berlin to work on the play Images of Louise Brooks directed by Sven Mundt.

Along with her film work, Clark also has made guest appearances on television series, including The Dating Game, Magnum, P.I., Banacek, Simon & Simon, Matlock, Baywatch Nights, Criminal Minds and Twin Peaks: The Return. Clark appeared on Ken Reid's TV Guidance Counselor podcast on January 20, 2017. Her 2025 memoir, Tight Heads, features her Polaroid photographs capturing her time during the New Hollywood era.

== Personal life ==
Clark dated Jeff Bridges for several years after they met on the set of Fat City in 1972. She was married to Marjoe Gortner from 1978 to 1979. She married Jeff Wald in 1987 and divorced him in 1988.

== Filmography ==
=== Film ===
Year	Title	Role	Notes
1972	Fat City	Faye Murdock	
1973	American Graffiti	Debbie Dunham	Nominated for the Academy Award for Best Supporting Actress
1976	I Will, I Will... for Now	Sally Bingham	
1976	The Man Who Fell to Earth	Mary-Lou	
1977	Handle with Care	Pam "Electra" Armbruster	
1978	The Big Sleep	Camilla Sternwood	
1979	When You Comin' Back, Red Ryder?	Cheryl	
1979	More American Graffiti	Debbie Dunham	
1979	Starcrash	Stella Star	English version, voice
1982	National Lampoon's Movie Madness	Susan Cooper	
1982	Q	Joan	
1983	Blue Thunder	Kate	
1983	Amityville 3-D	Melanie	
1984	Hambone and Hillie	Nancy Rollins	
1985	Cat's Eye	Sally Ann Cressner	
1986	At Close Range	Mary Sue Whitewood	
1988	The Blob	Fran Hewitt	
1988	Blind Curve	Mimi	
1991	Cool as Ice	Grace Winslow	
1992	Deuce Coupe	Jean Fitzpatrick	
1992	Original Intent	Jessica Cameron	
1992	Buffy the Vampire Slayer	Joyce Summers	
1997	Niagara, Niagara	Sally	
2000	Cherry Falls	Marge Marken	
2002	The Month of August	Tina	
2007	Zodiac	Carol Fisher	
2008	Dog Tags	Deb Merritt	
2009	The Informant!	Mrs. Whitacre	
2009	Cry of the Mummy	Jane Torquemada	Short
2011	Bob's New Suit	Aunt Tootie	
2016	Cold Moon	Evelyn Larkin	
2018	5 Weddings	Claudia Burrell	
2018	Two Girls	Adult Ida	Voice
2019	Five Old Comedy Writers Talking Sh*t	Actress	Short
2023	Amends of the Father	Michele Kantino	

=== Television ===
Year	Title	Role	Notes
1972	Room 222	Andrea Martin	Episode: "The Witch of Whitman High"
1973	The New Perry Mason	Julie Potter	Episode: "The Case of the Prodigal Prophet"
1973	Banacek	Gretel	Episode: "No Stone Unturned"
1973–1974	Insight	Ginny	2 episodes
1974	The New Dick Van Dyke Show	Pamela Sherry	Episode: "The Hickey"
1976	James Dean	Chris White	TV film
1979	Amateur Night at the Dixie Bar and Grill	Sharee	TV film
1980	Where the Ladies Go	Charlene	TV film
1980	Rodeo Girl	J.R. Patterson	TV film
1982	Faerie Tale Theatre	Queen Gwynneth	Episode: "The Tale of the Frog Prince"
1982	Johnny Belinda	Julie Sayles	TV film
1983	Cocaine and Blue Eyes	Ruthann Gideon	TV film
1984	I Gave at the Office	Julie	TV film
1985–1986	Magnum, P.I.	Leslie "Scooter" Emory	2 episodes
1986	Simon & Simon	Cotton	Episode: "Act Five"
1986	Popeye Doyle	Corinne Evans	TV film
1986	Starman	Shannon McGovern	Episode: "Like Father, Like Son"
1986	Hunter	Jody Stone	Episode: "Crime of Passion"
1987	The Hitchhiker	Cheryl Barnes	Episode: "Secret Ingredient"
1987	Brothers	Candy	Episode: "There's a Lid for Every Pot"
1987	Matlock	Kitty Carroll	Episode: "The Country Boy"
1988	St. Elsewhere	Harry	Episode: "Their Town"
1990	Father Dowling Mysteries	Iris Blackman	Episode: "The Passionate Painter Mystery"
1992	The Price She Paid	Marlene	TV film
1995	The Wright Verdicts	Eileen Cates	Episode: "Ex-Corpus Delicti"
1995	Baywatch Nights	Julie Young	Episode: "Just a Gigolo"
2006	Mystery Woman: Redemption	Kathy Starkwell	TV film
2012–2025	Criminal Minds	Sandy Jareau	4 episodes
2013	On Cinema	Herself	Episode: "The First Annual On Cinema Oscar Special"
2016	Roadside Stars	Grandma Lambert	TV film
2017	Twin Peaks	Doris Truman	2 episodes

== Awards and nominations ==
Year	Award	Category	Production	Result
1973	Academy Awards	Academy Award for Best Supporting Actress	American Graffiti	Nominated
