= Best Defense =

1984 film by Willard Huyck

- Theatrical release poster by Steven Chorney
- Directed by: Willard Huyck
- Screenplay by: Willard Huyck; Gloria Katz
- Based on: Easy and Hard Ways Out by Robert Grossbach
- Produced by: Gloria Katz
- Starring: Dudley Moore; Eddie Murphy; Kate Capshaw
- Cinematography: Donald Peterman
- Edited by: Sidney Wolinsky
- Music by: Patrick Williams
- Production company: Cinema Group Ventures
- Distributed by: Paramount Pictures
- Release date: July 20, 1984 (U.S.)
- Running time: 94 minutes
- Country: United States
- Language: English
- Budget: $18 million
- Box office: $19,265,302 (domestic)

Best Defense is a 1984 American action comedy film, starring Dudley Moore and Eddie Murphy. The original music score was composed by Patrick Williams. It was released by Paramount Pictures.

The film follows the lives of Wylie Cooper and T.M. Landry, two different characters who never interact. One of the two sub-plots involves Cooper, an engineer who tries to develop a new gyroscope for tanks, and eventually uses the design plans of a murdered competitor. The other subplot involves Landry, a tank commander who accidentally wanders into a war zone while trying to navigate a poorly designed tank.

The film was released on July 20, 1984, grossing a total of $19 million at the box office, and received negative reviews from critics.

== Plot ==
The film takes place as two parallel plots separated by a couple of years: In 1982, Wylie Cooper is an engineer developing a targeting system on a tank for the United States Army. In 1984, US Army tank commander Lt. T.M. Landry is sent to Kuwait to demonstrate the "XM-10 Annihilator," America's latest main battle tank, which is equipped with Cooper's system. Because of the tank's poor design and shoddy construction, Landry and his crew are barely able to control or navigate the XM-10 before it leaves the proving grounds and wanders into a combat zone during Iraq's invasion of Kuwait. Cooper and Landry never directly interact during the film, but the plot shows how the decisions made by Cooper affect Landry's tank.

Cooper, an engineer for a troubled defense contractor, is in charge of designing the "DYP-gyro," a gyroscope for the army's new tank. The company's future hinges on the success of the project. Cooper's gyro fails a crucial test, dooming the company. Downtrodden, Cooper later crosses paths with another engineer named Frank Holtzman who has also designed a DYP-gyro. Holtzman, fearful of what will happen in his meeting with Jeff (Rasche), a deep-cover KGB agent, secretly hides the plans in Cooper's briefcase. After Holtzman is murdered, Cooper discovers the plans. Cooper's co-worker and best friend Steve Loparino later puts Cooper's name on the plans, and when the "new" gyro works, Cooper is hailed for saving the company. In 1984, Landry's tank comes under fire from Iraqi jets, leading Landry to plead that he does not belong in this war, shouting "I'm from Cleveland!" at the attacking planes.

Back in 1982, Cooper is contacted by Jeff who tries to obtain the DYP plans. The FBI, knowing that Cooper took credit for somebody else's work, forces him to act as bait for Jeff in a set-up operation. The set-up nearly fails - Jeff is killed during a gun battle, and Cooper himself is shot. Realizing his mortality while being put on an ambulance, Cooper confesses to Clair Lewis, an attractive co-worker, that he stole the DYP. This triggers an angry response from Clair and also from his wife Laura who, arriving on the scene, realizes that Cooper has been cheating on her. Surviving the bullet, Cooper receives even worse news from a co-worker: the DYP-gyro he claimed credit for will not work, because it will cause overheating in the WAM, another critical component, crippling the tank's fire control and, in a combat situation, dooming the tank.

The film reaches its climax in a sequence weaving between 1982 when a more conscientious Cooper, having recovered, confronts his employers about the flaws in the DYP, while in 1984, Landry attempts to fire the main gun while under attack by an Iraqi gunship. As had been predicted, the DYP causes failure in the WAM, suggesting that Cooper's protest was ignored.

Instead, the camera cuts to the innards and shows that the DYP has been redesigned according to an idea that Cooper had in 1982 while fixing one of his son's toys. The redesign works, enabling the tank's air defense rockets to launch and destroy the Iraqi gunship. The film ends with Cooper and Landry as heroes in their respective jobs.

== Cast ==
- Dudley Moore as Wylie Cooper
- Eddie Murphy as Lieutenant T.M. Landry
- Kate Capshaw as Laura Cooper
- George Dzundza as Steve Loparino
- Helen Shaver as Clair Lewis
- Mark Arnott as Harvey Brank
- Peter Michael Goetz as Frank Joyner
- Tom Noonan as Frank Holtzman
- David Rasche as KGB Agent Jeff
- Paul Comi as Chief Agent
- John Hostetter as Quirk

== Production ==
The film did not originally feature Eddie Murphy's character T.M. Landry, and was solely a Dudley Moore film. The film's preview screenings were received poorly, and the studio suggested filming a role for Murphy, who was at the peak of his popularity. Murphy's part was almost completely unconnected from the rest of the film, and his character never even comes into contact with any of the main cast. There had been a scene filmed during the re-shoots which featured Moore and Murphy's characters Wylie Cooper and Landry meeting, but it was cut from the film. Additionally, several other scenes that were important to the original plot were cut in order to fit the newly shot scenes with Murphy into the film, thus contributing to the film's poor reception and reputation as a "meandering mess."

== Reception ==
The movie received negative reviews from critics. On Metacritic the film has a weighted average score of 29 out of 100, based on eight critics, indicating "generally unfavorable" reviews. It opened strong at No. 2 behind Ghostbusters with $7.8 million but quickly lost steam, and grossed a disappointing $19.2 million. It was nominated for a 1984 Stinkers Bad Movie Awards for Worst Picture, losing to Dune. Audiences polled by CinemaScore gave the film an average grade of "C" on an A+ to F scale.

The immense losses suffered by theater owners on the film led to the outlawing of blind bidding contracts in Pennsylvania and the overall decline of the practice.

When Murphy hosted Saturday Night Live about five months after the film was released, he admitted in his opening monologue that he knew the film was awful and did it for the money: "After I did 48 Hrs. and Trading Places, all these scripts started coming from everywhere, and I picked up a script called Best Defense. There's a movie that sucked real bad! At first, I wasn't going to do it because I read the script, and I felt like I was an actor at first. But the money they gave me to do Best Defense, y'all would have done Best Defense too, OK? ... I was like, 'What?! How dare you give me a script like this! Oh, that much money? Let's go!' Best Defense turned out to be the worst movie ever done in the history of anything, and all of a sudden, I wasn't that hot no more. So, I called up the producer of Saturday Night Live, and I go, 'Um, you still got my dressin' room?'"

Footage of David Rasche from this film was successfully used as a screen test for his lead role in the 1986 comedy TV series Sledge Hammer!

== See also ==
- The Pentagon Wars
