= Willard Huyck =

American film director

- Born: Willard Miller Huyck, Jr. September 8, 1945 (age 80); Los Angeles, California, U.S.
- Occupations: Screenwriter, film director
- Years active: 1969–2008
- Spouse: Gloria Katz (m. 1969; died 2018)
- Awards: National Society of Film Critics Award for Best Screenplay; 1973 American Graffiti New York Film Critics Circle Award for Best Screenplay; 1973 American Graffiti

Willard Miller Huyck, Jr. (born September 8, 1945) is an American retired screenwriter, director and producer, best known for his association with George Lucas.

== Career ==
Huyck and Lucas met as students at the USC School of Cinematic Arts and became members of Francis Ford Coppola's American Zoetrope group of filmmakers. Along with his wife Gloria Katz, Huyck wrote screenplays for films including American Graffiti, Lucky Lady, Indiana Jones and the Temple of Doom, Radioland Murders, and the unproduced film Night Ride Down. They also performed uncredited script polishing on the original Star Wars: Episode IV- A New Hope.

Huyck also directed four films, which he co-wrote with Gloria Katz: Messiah of Evil, French Postcards, Best Defense, and Howard the Duck. The latter film received universally negative reviews at its release, but in subsequent years has become a cult classic. Katz and Huyck also wrote and produced the NBC television films A Father's Homecoming and Mothers, Daughters and Lovers. Willard Huyck is a current member of the Writers Guild of America and Directors Guild of America.

In addition to their work in the film industry, Katz and Huyck are well known as art collectors, having collected Indian miniature paintings beginning in the 1970s. This collection was sold at a Sotheby's auction in New York City in 2001. In subsequent years, they amassed a collection of Japanese photography that spanned from the late 1850s to the present. This collection was acquired in 2018 by the Smithsonian's National Museum of Asian Art. The couple also wrote a photographic catalogue of the collection entitled "Views of Japan," designed and edited by Manfred Heiting and published by Steidl. Huyck is a member of the J. Paul Getty Museum Photography Council.

== Personal life ==
Huyck married Katz in 1969. They remained married until her death in 2018. They have one daughter, Rebecca, born in 1983.

== Filmography ==
=== Film ===
Year	Title	Director	Writer	Notes
1968	The Devil's 8	No	Yes	
1973	American Graffiti	No	Yes	
1974	Messiah of Evil	Yes	Yes	Also uncredited producer and actor Role: Zombie in a car
1975	Lucky Lady	No	Yes	
1979	French Postcards	Yes	Yes	
1984	Indiana Jones and the Temple of Doom	No	Yes	
1984	Best Defense	Yes	Yes	
1986	Howard the Duck	Yes	Yes	
1994	Radioland Murders	No	Yes	

==== Other credits ====
Year	Title	Role	Notes
1977	Star Wars	Script doctor	Uncredited
1979	More American Graffiti	Based on the characters created by	
2009	Remembering Messiah of Evil	Special thanks	Video documentary short
2013	A Fuller Life	Thanks	Documentary film

=== Television ===
Year	Title	Writer	Executive producer	Notes
1988	A Father's Homecoming	Yes	Yes	
1989	Mothers, Daughters and Lovers	Yes	Yes	
2008	Secrets of a Hollywood Nurse	Yes	No	Also actor Role: Electronic Larynx Man
