= Gloria Katz =

American film producer

- Katz in 1974
- Born: Gloria Pearl Katz; October 25, 1942; Los Angeles, California, U.S.
- Died: November 25, 2018 (aged 76); Los Angeles, California, U.S.
- Occupations: Screenwriter; Film producer
- Years active: 1973-1994
- Spouse: Willard Huyck (m. 1969–2018)
- Children: 1
- Awards: National Society of Film Critics Award for Best Screenplay; 1973 American Graffiti; New York Film Critics Circle Award for Best Screenplay; 1973 American Graffiti

Gloria Pearl Katz (October 25, 1942 – November 25, 2018) was an American screenwriter and film producer, best known for her association with film director George Lucas.

== Biography ==
=== Early life ===
Katz was born in Los Angeles, California; the oldest of two children born to homemaker Pauline Wallach and Reuben Katz, who owned a truck terminal. Her younger brother is cinematographer Stephen M. Katz.

She majored in English as an undergraduate at the University of California, Berkeley and obtained a masters in film at UCLA.

=== Career ===
Along with her husband Willard Huyck - a college friend of George Lucas - Katz's credited screenplays include American Graffiti, Indiana Jones and the Temple of Doom, Howard the Duck, and the unproduced film Night Ride Down.

As uncredited script doctors, a common practice, Katz and Huyck helped polish Lucas's script for Star Wars: Katz and Huyck are responsible for helping Lucas write some of the humor in the film and create some developments for Princess Leia.

In 1973, Katz, alongside Huyck and Lucas, were nominated for the Academy Award for Best Screenplay for American Graffiti.

== Personal life and death ==
Katz and Huyck married in 1969; they stayed married until her death. They had one child, a daughter named Rebecca.

Katz died from ovarian cancer on November 25, 2018, one month after her 76th birthday.

== Filmography ==
=== Film ===
Year	Film	Writer	Producer	Notes
1973	Messiah of Evil	Yes	Yes	Also uncredited co-director with Willard Huyck and uncredited actress; Role: Ticket Booth Zombie
1973	American Graffiti	Yes	No	
1975	Lucky Lady	Yes	No	
1979	French Postcards	Yes	Yes	Also actress; Role: Chief Snail
1984	Indiana Jones and the Temple of Doom	Yes	No	
1984	Best Defense	Yes	Yes	
1986	Howard the Duck	Yes	Yes	
1994	Radioland Murders	Yes	No	

==== Other credits ====
Year	Film	Role	Notes
1977	Star Wars	Script doctor	Uncredited
1979	More American Graffiti	Based on characters created by	
TBA	Go West!	Special thanks	

=== Television ===
Year	Title	Writer	Executive producer	Notes
1988	A Father's Homecoming	Yes	Yes	Television film
1989	Mothers, Daughters and Lovers	Yes	Yes	Television film
