= The Projection Booth =

American film podcast

- Genre: Film
- Country of origin: United States
- Language: English

Cast and voices
- Hosted by: Mike White

Production
- Length: Variable

Technical specifications
- Audio format: MP3

Publication
- No. of episodes: 813 (as of September 2026)
- Original release: 7 March 2011
- Provider: SpreakerWeirding Way Media
- Updates: Wednesdays

Related
- Website: www.projectionboothpodcast.com

The Projection Booth is an American podcast about film, hosted by Mike White. Each episode examines a single film in depth, usually with guests who worked on it or who have particular expertise on it, and its subjects range from Hollywood classics and international art cinema to exploitation and cult films and documentaries. The first episode, on The Stunt Man, was released on 7 March 2011, and by March 2026 the show had released nearly 800 episodes.

The show is hosted by Mike White, the founder of the film fanzine Cashiers du Cinemart. Guests have included Jeff Goldblum, John Waters, William Friedkin, Joe Dante, Dolph Lundgren, and Peter Bogdanovich as well as Ed Harris, Luke Wilson, Chris Elliott, Ellen Burstyn, Bruce Dern, Michael Murphy, Nicholas Meyer, Julie Taymor, Joe Bob Briggs, and Nancy Allen. The podcast is part of Weirding Way Media and has been nominated for the Rondo Hatton Classic Horror Awards.

== Format ==
Each show contains a discussion of a single main film. Sometimes other films that complement or contrast the main topic are discussed. Often, guest interviews are included. Guests have included other podcast hosts, authors, or people with particular insights on a given film or topic, and at times, the filmmakers themselves.

Episodes are researched at length and are often long. For Eyes Wide Shut, the hosts went through the film scene by scene in an episode of about three hours, and a 2017 profile noted a three-hour episode on Mulholland Drive. Episode lengths vary; many are less than an hour.

White has said that preparing an episode involves watching the film, reading about it, and listening to its soundtrack, which he estimated in 2023 at twenty to forty hours of research per episode; a 2017 profile put the figure at about 100 hours and reported about 5,000 weekly listeners.

Some of the show's most popular episodes include shows on RoboCop (with star Nancy Allen), described in 2013 as the show's most popular, The Magnificent Ambersons, and Conan the Barbarian.

While covering a wide array of films, the show has been criticized for occasionally dedicating episodes to obscure films not available on DVD.

== History ==
The podcast started when the original hosts, Mike White and Justin Bozung, were driving from Detroit to the 2010 B Movie Celebration in Franklin, Indiana and discussing their favorite, and least favorite, film podcasts. in Franklin, Indiana and discussing their favorite, and least favorite, film podcasts. The first episode, on The Stunt Man (1980), featured director Richard Rush and star Steve Railsback, arranged by Bozung.

In its early years the show's files were hosted on the same server as White's original website, which slowed as the audience grew. By its hundredth episode in 2013, on the television film KISS Meets the Phantom of the Park with producer Terry Morse Jr., the show had partnered with Jackalope Radio.

Bozung left the show after the Hickey & Boggs episode. After a series of guest co-hosts, Rob St. Mary became a semi-permanent co-host. St. Mary's first full-time show was the 29 February 2012 episode on Frankenhooker. He left his full-time spot following the 24 November 2015 episode on Shadow of a Doubt.

=== Weirding Way Media ===
The Projection Booth is part of Weirding Way Media, which describes itself as an independent, creator-driven podcast network. The show is supported by listeners through Patreon and is partnered with Seattle's Scarecrow Video. In March 2026 the network marked the show's fifteenth anniversary.

== Reception ==
The Projection Booth has been highlighted by The Washington Post, IndieWire, Entertainment Weekly, Filmmaker, and Mental Floss as one of the best film and movie podcasts available.

Though not specifically a horror film podcast, The Projection Booth has been nominated multiple times for the Rondo Hatton Classic Horror Awards, including in the multimedia (podcast) category.

== Hosts ==
Mike White is a writer based in Westland, Michigan, who started the Cashiers du Cinemart zine in 1994. Best known for his work Who Do You Think You're Fooling?, White has appeared in documentaries such as David Goodis: To A Pulp and The People vs. George Lucas. His collected zine writing was published as Impossibly Funky (BearManor Media, 2010). In 2013, White was part of the panel discussion at the Rue Morgue Festival of Fear, "Misadventures in Horror Podcasting". White has also served on the juries of film festivals including Slamdance, Cinekink, MicroCineFest, Blue Water, and Kansas City.

The show also has a "Robohost", developed by Bell Laboratories. Robohost is a computer program that continuously updates with all episodes of The Projection Booth podcast as well as anything written about or said about the show on other podcasts. Robohost has made appearances on the episodes Auschwitz and American Mary.

=== Co-hosts ===
Revolving co-hosts since 2014 have included film critic and author Maitland McDonagh, David Kittredge, Chris Stachiw, Samm Deighan, Skizz Cyzyk, Chris Cummins, Heather "Boom Boom" Drain, and Kat Ellinger. The show's website lists a rotating cast of co-hosts.

=== Former ===
The show was formerly co-hosted by Rob St. Mary and Justin Bozung. St. Mary is a writer who worked at WDET Public Radio in Detroit. He produced the horror-comedy Tainted which was released via Troma Entertainment in 1998. After the publication of his book Re-Entry: The Orbit Book Anthology, he left full-time hosting but returns for select discussions. Bozung, also known as "Mondo Justin", was the creator of the Mondo Film & Video Guide. He was on episodes 1 (The Stunt Man) to episode 36 (Hickey & Boggs). He has also hosted his own podcast.

== Commentary tracks ==
Members of the Projection Booth team have recorded audio commentary tracks for home-video releases, including The Thing (Arrow Video), Exorcist II: The Heretic (Shout! Factory), Valerie and Her Week of Wonders (Second Run), and Bloodsucking Freaks (XT Video).

== Related shows ==
White co-hosts other podcasts with Chris Stachiw, including The Kolchak Tapes (focused on Kolchak: The Night Stalker), Dreams for Sale (focused on the 1985 revival of The Twilight Zone; with Father Malone), and The Shabby Detective: Yet Another Columbo Podcast (focused on Columbo). He has also co-hosted The Life & Times of Captain Barney Miller (focused on Barney Miller).

== Episodes ==
Episode – Film discussed	Release date	Guest(s)	Guest Co-Host(s)
20 Years of Madness (2015)	22 November 2015	Jeremy Royce, Jerry White Jr.	
24 Hour Party People (2002)	8 January 2025		Father Malone, Axel Kohagen
322 (1969)	18 September 2024		Angela Mac, Jonathan Owen
35000 Watts - The Story of College Radio (2024)	22 March 2024	Michael Millard	Skizz Cyzyk, Maurice Bursztynski
3:10 to Yuma (1957)	14 February 2024	C. Courtney Joyner, Gregg Sutter	Rob St. Mary, Jedidiah Ayres
The 5,000 Fingers of Dr. T. (1953)	7 November 2024		John Monaghan, David MacGregor
90 Degrees in the Shade (1965)	14 November 2022		Jonathan Owen, Kat Ellinger
Abar: the First Black Superman (1977)	16 March 2011	Tobar Mayo	
Adelheid (1969)	25 September 2024		Cerise Howard, Jonathan Owen
The Adventure of Sherlock Holmes' Smarter Brother (1975)	12 April 2023		David MacGregor, Aaron Peterson
The Adventures of Ford Fairlane (1990)	14 August 2012	Rex Weiner, Daniel Waters, Floyd Mutrux	Stuart "Feedback" Andrews
After Dark, My Sweet (1990)	16 June 2015	James Foley, Robert Redlin	Robert Polito
After Hours (1985)	3 May 2023		Tim Luz, Chris Stachiw
Age of Audio (2025)	11 August 2025	Shaun Michael Colón	James Cridland, Chris Stachiw
Airplane II: The Sequel (1982)	30 April 2025	Ken Finkeleman, Robert Hays, James A. Watson Jr., Al Jean, Mike Reiss	Mark Begley, Chris Stachiw
Akira (1988)	25 July 2017	Jonathan Clements	El Goro, Chris Cummins
Alien - Romulus (2024)	21 August 2024		Chris Stachiw, Father Malone
Alien 3 (1992)	21 July 2015	Lance Henriksen, Holt McCallany, Vincent Ward, John Fasano, Mark Verheiden	Brad Jones
Alien Nation (1988)	16 March 2022	Graham Baker, Rockne S. O'Bannon, Peter Jason	Josh Stewart, Cecil Trachenberg
Alien Resurrection (1997)	15 January 2021	Gary Dourdan, Leland Orser, Pitof	El Goro, Mike Thompson
All My Good Countrymen (1969)	2 September 2020		Spencer Parsons, Chris Stachiw
All That Jazz (1979)	19 August 2020	Alan Heim, Keith Gordon, Deborah Geffner	Emma Westwood, David Kittredge
All the President's Men (1976)	15 January 2025		Andras Jones, Robert Bellissimo
All Things Must Pass: The Rise and Fall of Tower Records (2016)	1 November 2015	Sean M. Stuart	Carol Borden
Alphaville (1965)	10 November 2015	David Sterritt	Cullen Gallagher
Altered States (1980)	28 April 2015	Bob Balaban, Charles Haid	Scott Clickers
Alucarda (1977)	22 October 2025		Mark Begley, Ryan Luis Rodriguez
The American Astronaut (2001)	28 December 2011	Cory McAbee	Josh Johnson, Skizz Cyzyk
An American Carol (2008)	20 March 2018	Myrna Sokoloff	Mike Sullivan, Rob St. Mary
An American Hippie in Israel (1972)	17 July 2012		Yaniv Eidelstein
American Mary (2012)	7 October 2014	Jen Soska, Sylvia Soska, Tristan Risk	Iris-Dora Saravia
American Psycho (2000)	20 June 2017	Mary Harron, Guinevere Turner, Roberta Hanley	David Rodgers Paula Guthat
American Tiger (1989)	10 April 2019		Kat Ellinger, Cullen Gallagher
The Amphibian Man (1962)	4 May 2022		Gianna D'Emilio, Alistair Pitts
Angel Face (1952)	26 November 2024		Jedidiah Ayres, Lexi Van Dyke
Angel's Egg (1985)	18 November 2025	Lyle Zanca, Dan Schindel	
Ángeles y querubines (1971)	30 May 2025		Miguel Llanso, Aaron Peterson
Annihilation (2018)	10 July 2019		Tony Black, Chris Stachiw
Another State of Mind (1984)	1 November 2019	Adam Small, Peter Stuart	Heather Drain, Eric J. Peterson
The Antenna (2019)	2 October 2020	Orçun Behram	David Rodgers, Mark Begley
Apocalypse Now (1979)	7 June 2016	Fax Bahr	Paul Zimmerman, Rich Edwards
The Apocalypse Series	16 August 2019	André van Heerden	Jen Handorf, Dan Martin
The Apple (1980)	18 January 2012	Menahem Golan, Coby Recht, Iris Yotvat, Joss Ackland, George S. Clinton, Catherine Mary Stewart	Eric Bresler, Dan Tabor
Arcana (1972)	22 December 2023		Kat Ellinger, Kyler Fey
Arizona Dream (1993)	28 January 2026	David Atkins	Andras Jones, David Rodgers
Army of Shadows (1969)	4 September 2024	Ginette Vincendeau	Samm Deighan, Andrew Leavold
Arrebato (1979)	4 July 2017		Elric Kane
Arsenic & Old Lace (1944)	29 April 2022	Joseph McBride, Charles Dennis	Sylvia Hubbard, Kat Ellinger
The Art of Dying (1991)	15 June 2011	Wings Hauser	
Assault on Precinct 13 (1976)	21 April 2021	Troy Howarth, Tommy Wallace	Aaron Peterson, Father Malone
Auschwitz (2011)	4 January 2012	Dr, Uwe Boll	Robohost
Avanti Popolo (1986)	4 December 2024	Zohar M. Sela	Will Youmans, Yaniv Eidelstein
The Awful Truth (1937)	20 April 2022		Aaron Peterson, Kat Ellinger
Baby, Baby, Baby	14 April 2015	Ian Jones, David Mooney, Skip, Todaler, Chrissy	Fräulein von B
The Bad Lieutenant Films	22 April 2014	Edward Pressman, William M. Finkelstein	Patrick Bromley
Bad Timing: A Sensual Obsession (1980)	29 March 2016	Nicolas Roeg, Yale Udoff, Anthony Lawson	Elric Kane, Adam Long
Ball of Fire (1941)	6 April 2022	Joseph McBride	Kat Ellinger, Maitland McDonagh
Bamboozled (2000)	17 February 2014	John Strausbaugh	Jay Scott Smith
The Baron (1977)	8 February 2023	Alan Metzger, Phillip Fenty	David Walker, Father Malone
Barton Fink (1991)	24 May 2016	Christopher Murney	Adam Schartoff, Rob St. Mary
Batman Returns (1992)	30 December 2014	Daniel Waters, Sam Hamm, Mark Reinhart	Mark Gledhill
Battle Beyond the Stars (1980)	18 July 2025	Allan Holzman	Father Malone, Chris Stachiw
Battle Royale (2000)	22 February 2012	Linda Hoaglund	Coffin Jon
Battlefield Earth (2000)	4 June 2013	Roger Christian, J.D. Shapiro	
Battles without Honor and Humanity (1974)	12 June 2012	Linda Hoaglund	
The Beaver Trilogy (& Part IV) (2000/2015)	10 July 2020	Trent Harris, Brad Besser	Rahne Alexander, Bill Ackerman
Beetlejuice, Beetlejuice (2024)	12 September 2024		Chris Stachiw, Father Malone
Begotten (1990)	22 October 2018		Heather Drain, Ben Buckingham
Being There (1979)	29 January 2025	Aaron Hunter	Suzen Tekla Kruglinska, Maurice Bursztynski
Bela Lugosi Meets a Brooklyn Gorilla (1952)	6 October 2021	Michael Barrie, Gary D. Rhodes	Fredde Duke, Richard Whitley, Jamie Klein
The Bell from Hell (1973)	30 October 2024		Nicholas Schlegel, Heather Drain
Belladonna of Sadness (1973)	26 June 2019		Heather Drain, Kat Ellinger
The Bellboy (1960)	9 August 2017	Shawn Levy	Craig Bierko, Peter Flynn
Belle de Jour (1967)	23 February 2022		Samm Deighan
Better Off Dead (1985)	23 July 2020	Diane Franklin, Savage Steve Holland, Curtis Armstrong	Mike "McBeardo" McPadden, Jess Byard
A Better Tomorrow (1986)	26 December 2017	Karen Fang, Kenneth E. Hall, Barna William Donovan	Beth Accomando
Bettie Page Reveals All (2012)	28 November 2013	Mark Mori	
Beverly Hills Cop (1984)	21 March 2017	Daniel Petrie Jr., Steven Berkoff, Ronny Cox, John Ashton, Harold Faltermeyer, Steven E. de Sousa	Elric Kane, Chris Cummins
Beverly Hills Cop: Axel F (2024)	11 July 2024		Chris Stachiw, Father Malone
The Beyond (1981)	13 October 2015		Troy Howarth
Beyond the Valley of the Dolls (1970)	10 January 2017	Doyle Green, Dolly Read-Martin, Marcia McBroom, John Lazar, Erica Gavin, Stu Phillips, Lynn Carey	Heather Drain, Jordan Blossey
The Big Clock (1947)	4 November 2020		Terry Frost, Tim Luz
The Big Combo (1955)	6 November 2019		Jedidiah Ayres, Brian Hoyle
The Big Dig (1969)	4 March 2020	Rafi Kishon	Maurice Bursztynski, Yaniv Eidelstein
The Big Fix (1978)	22 November 2023	Jeremy Kagan, Roger L. Simon	Jedidiah Ayres, Andrew Nette
The Big Gundown (1968)	21 July 2021		Beth Accomando, Mike Malloy
Big Gus, What's the Fuss? (1973)	31 December 2013	Lloyd Kaufman	
The Big Heat (1953)	4 November 2014	Patrick McGilligan	Jay A. Gertzman
The Big Red One (1980)	12 July 2011	Robert Carradine, Christa Fuller, Samantha Fuller	
The Big Sleep (1946)	20 November 2018	Dahlia Schweitzer	Terry Frost, Eric Cohen
Big Trouble in Little China (1986)	8 January 2019	Sandy King Carpenter, W.D. Richter	Vincenzo Natali, Tony Black
Big Wednesday (1978)	4 October 2011	William Katt	
Bill & Ted Trilogy, The (1989-2020)	29 January 2021	Dan Shor, William Sadler, Alex Winter, Chris Matheson	Chris Stachiw, Josh Stewart
The Bird with the Crystal Plumage (1970)	28 August 2012	Elena Past, Maitland McDonagh	
Birds, Orphans, and Fools (1969)	23 September 2020		Kat Ellinger, Jonathan Owen
The Bitter Tears of Petra von Kant (1972)	3 March 2021		Kat Ellinger, Heather Drain
The Black Cat (1934)	25 August 2015	Noah Isenberg, Edward G. Pettit	Maitland McDonagh
Black Christmas (1974)	22 December 2021	Simon Fitzjohn, Art Hindle, Paul Downey, David Hastings	Maitland McDonagh, Mark Begley
Black Dynamite (2009)	4 March 2014	Scott Sanders, Byron Minns	
Black God, White Devil (1964)	8 July 2020		Chris Stachiw, Ken Stanley
Black Gravel (1961)	12 November 2025		Samm Deighan, Andrew Nette
The Black Hole (1979)	16 June 2021		El Goro, David Kittredge
Black Legion (1937)	9 August 2023	Tom Stanton	Otto Bruno, Rahne Alexander
Black Lizard (1962)	10 August 2022	Earl Jackson	Carol Borden, Samm Deighan
Black Moon (1975)	9 February 2022	Hugo Frey	Aaron Peterson, Kat Ellinger
Black Roses (1988)	3 June 2014	John Fasano	Mike McBeardo McPadden
Black Shampoo (1976)	23 December 2013	Greydon Clark, Dean Cundey	
Blade Runner (1982)	20 September 2012	David Hyde, Paul M. Sammon, William Sanderson	Josh Hadley
Blade Runner 2049 (2017)	19 July 2023		Rob St. Mary, Chris Stachiw
Blast of Silence (1964)	29 April 2014	Allen Baron	Howard A. Rodman
Blind Beast (1969)	5 February 2020		Coffin Jon, Elric Kane
Blonde Ambition (1981)	30 March 2022	John Amero, Larry Revene, LaRue Watts, Kurt Mann	Heather Drain, April Hall
Blood and Diamonds (1977)	19 March 2025		Jedidiah Ayres, Ryan Luis Rodriguez
Bloodsucking Freaks (1976)	7 December 2011	Joel M. Reed	
Blow Out (1981)	12 November 2013	Dennis Franz, Nancy Allen, Fred C. Caruso, Bill Mesce Jr.	
Blue Collar (1978)	1 September 2015	Paul Schrader	Maitland McDonagh
Blue Velvet (1986)	5 March 2013	Paul M. Sammon	Vincenzo Natali
The Blues Brothers (1980)	20 January 2021	John Landis, Steven Williams, Laila Nablusi	Brad Jones, Suzen Tekla Kruglnska
Bob Le Flambeur (1956)	8 March 2023	Ginette Vincendeau	Samm Deighan, Andrew Leavold
Body Double (1984)	6 March 2019	Robert J. Avrech, Gregg Henry	Bill Ackerman, Jim Vendiola
Bone (1972)	25 February 2014	Larry Cohen	Joe Bannerman
Book of Revelation (2006)	24 December 2025	Ana Kokkinos	Spencer Parsons, Rob St. Mary
Boss Nigger (1974)	13 May 2014	Fred "The Hammer" Williamson	
Bowfinger (1999)	1 May 2024		Kevin Lehane, Rob St. Mary
Boxing Helena (1993)	22 December 2015	Jennifer Chambers Lynch	Heather Drain, Cecil Trachenberg
Boys in the Sand (1971)	14 January 2014	Wakefield Poole	
The Brain That Wouldn't Die (1962)	10 December 2013	Jon Gillespie, Tom Sivak, Kevin Frei	
Brainstorm (1983)	30 December 2019	Douglas Trumbull, Louise Fletcher, Bruce Joel Rubin, Philip Frank Messina, Robert Stitzel, Joseph Maddrey	Samm Deighan, David Kittredge
Brand X (1970)	26 May 2015	Sam Chamberlain, Frank Cavestani	
Branded to Kill (1967)	2 April 2013		Coffin Jon, Bill Fulkerson
The Brave (1997)	4 June 2025	Paul McCudden, Charles Evans Jr.	Jedidiah Ayres, Spencer Parsons
Brazil (1985)	30 December 2020	Sir Michael Palin	Jeff Meyers, Skizz Cyzyk
The Bride! (2027)	16 March 2026		Chris Stachiw
Brief Encounters (1967)	25 May 2022	Jane Taubman	Gianna D'Emilio, Alistair Pitts
Bring Me the Head of Alfredo Garcia (1974)	2 October 2012	Gordon Dawson, Ian Cooper	
The Brood (1979)	30 October 2020	Cindy Hinds, Stephen Bissette	Samm Deighan, Mark Begley
Buddy Buddy (1981)	29 June 2022	Miles Chapin	Kat Ellinger, Heather Drain
Bullet (1996)	30 August 2023	Bruce Rubenstein	Chris Stachiw, Father Malone
A Bullet for the General (1966)	2 August 2021		Andrew Leavold, Samm Deighan
The Burglar (1957)	25 November 2014		Duane Swierczynski
Burglar (1987)	12 February 2025	Lawrence Block	Kevin Lehane, Cullen Gallagher
A Buster Keaton Celebration	31 March 2021	Gus Macmillan	Heather Drain, Maurice Bursztynski
But I'm a Cheerleader (1999)	19 June 2019	Jamie Babbit	Joshua Grannell, Cassandra Baker
Cabin Boy (1994)	5 November 2013	Chris Elliott, Adam Resnick	Mike Sullivan
Caligula (1979)	5 August 2014	Ranjit Sandhu, Alexander Tuschinski	Maitland McDonagh
Caligula - The Ultimate Cut (2023)	19 August 2024	Caroline Kirkendoll, Alexander Tuschinski	Heather Drain, Rob St. Mary
Can Dialectics Break Bricks? (1973)	24 June 2020	Keith Sanborn	Rob St. Mary, Spencer Parsons
The Candy Tangerine Man (1975)	5 July 2011	Matt Cimber	
Capricious Summer (1968)	29 September 2021		Jonathan Owen, Kat Ellinger
Captain America (1990)	2 August 2011	Albert Pyun	Josh Hadley
Captain America: Brave New World (2025)	28 February 2025		Chris Stachiw
Careful (1992)	26 February 2013	Guy Maddin, George Toles, Greg Klymkiw	
Carrie (1976)	31 October 2021	Joseph Aisenberg, Nancy Allen, William Katt, Piper Laurie, Joe Maddrey	Jamey Duvall, Keith Gordon
The Cars That Ate Paris (1974)	21 February 2017	Jonathan Rayner, Hal McElroy, Terry Camilleri, Bruce Spence	Ben Buckingham, Kevin Heffernan
Casablanca (1942)	2 April 2025	Noah Isenberg, Alan K. Rode	Bill Ackerman, Federico Bertolini
Case for a Rookie Hangman (1970)	12 September 2017	Peter Hames	Kat Ellinger, Kevin Heffernan
The Cassandra Cat (1963)	28 September 2022		Spencer Parsons, Chris Stachiw
Céline and Julie Go Boating (1974)	28 June 2016	Jonathan Rosenbaum, Mary Wiles	Heather Drain, Chris Stachiw
Cemetery Without Crosses (1969)	15 July 2026		Oren Shai, Rich Edwards
Chameleon Street (1990)	24 November 2021	Daniel Noga, Wendell B. Harris Jr.	Jay Jackson, Jonathan Melville
The Changeling (1980)	1 March 2016	Peter Medak	Axel Kohagen, Andrew Jupin
Charley Varrick (1973)	16 May 2018	Andy Robinson	Heather Drain, Maurice Bursztynski
The Chase (1946)	29 November 2016	Francis M. Nevins Jr.	Maitland McDonagh, Cullen Gallagher
Chemical Cut	17 January 2014	Marjorie Conrad	
Chicken Park (1994)	2 February 2012	Mike Sullivan	
Children of Paradise (1945)	15 March 2023		Samm Dieghan, Keith Gordon
Chilly Scenes of Winter (1979)	14 February 2017	Joan Micklin Silver, John Heard, Amy Robinson, Griffin Dunne, Mark Metcalf	Daniel Kremer, Bill Ackerman
Chimes at Midnight (1965)	14 May 2026		David MacGregor, Spencer Parsons
Civil War (2024)	17 April 2024		Chris Stachiw, Father Malone
Cleanflix (2009)	23 July 2013	Andrew James, Joshua Ligairi	
Cleo/Leo (1989)	22 September 2015	Scott Baker, Jane Hamilton, Ginger Lynn Allen, Larry Revene	Jill Nelson
A Clockwork Orange (1971)	5 January 2022	Mike Kaplan, Andrew Biswell	Rob St. Mary, Yaniv Eidelstein
Close Encounters of the Third Kind (1977)	23 June 2021	Joe Alves, Matthew Robbins, Jim Bloom, Douglas Trumbull	Suzen Tekla Kruglnska, El Goro
Closely Watched Trains (1966)	5 September 2017	Jiri Menzel, Peter Hames	Jonathan Owen, Samm Deighan
Cockfighter (1974)	2 October 2024	Kier-la Janisse	Heather Drain, Jedidiah Ayres
Code 46 (2003)	20 July 2022	Frank Cottrell-Boyce, Andrew Eaton	Jedidiah Ayres, Dylan Davis
The Coffin Joe Trilogy	31 July 2012	André Barcinski	
The Color of Pomegranates (1969)	19 April 2018	Daniel Bird, James Steffen	Larry Revene
Colossus: The Forbin Project (1970)	1 December 2015	Eric Braeden	Maitland McDonagh, James Kruth, Chris Bricklemyer
Commando (1985)	30 July 2020	Steven E. DeSouza, Richard Tuggle	Ti Singh, Chris Stachiw
Communion (1989)	27 March 2024	Whitley Strieber, Philippe Mora	Joseph Maddrey, Jonathan Penner
The Company of Wolves (1984)	14 October 2020	James Gracey	Kat Ellinger, Heather Drain
Conan the Barbarian (1982)	24 February 2015	Edward R. Pressman, Sven-Ole Thorsen, Gerry Lopez, Roy Thomas, Paul M. Sammon, Mark Finn, Sean Hood, Josh Adkins	Josh Hadley, El Goro
The Conformist (1970)	31 August 2022		Samm Deighan, Dahlia Schweitzer
Conscience (1968)	8 December 2023	Sam Goff	Chris Stachiw, Ryan Luis Rodriguez
Conspirators of Pleasure (1996)	29 September 2025	Peter Hames	Jim Vendiola, Samm Deighan
Contact (1997)	15 December 2015	James V. Hart, William Fichtner, Lynda Obst, Seth Shostak	Jamey Duvall, Emily Intravia
The Conversation (1974)	20 November 2019		Vincenzo Natali, Jamey Duvall
The Cook, the Thief, His Wife & Her Lover (1989)	11 July 2017		Ken Stanley, Samm Deighan
Cool Hand Luke (1967)	19 June 2024		El Goro, Andrew Nette
Cop (1988)	26 November 2025	James B. Harris	Andrew Nette, Rod Lott
Corbeau, Le (1943)	20 May 2020	Judith Mayne	Ken Stanley, Kat Ellinger
Cosy Dens (1999)	10 September 2025		Philip Marinello, Rob St. Mary
The Counselor (2013)	26 January 2022	Steven Frye	John Walker, James Lawrence
The Cow (1969)	27 March 2020		Chris Stachiw, Heather Drain
The Creation of the Humanoids (1960)	11 December 2019		Jennifer Handorf, Dan Martin
The Cremator (1968)	19 September 2017		Samm Deighan
Crime Wave (1985)	19 July 2011	Eva Kovacs, Neil Lawrie, Greg Klymkiw	Skizz Cyzyk
Crimes and Misdemeanors (1989)	25 December 2024	Eric Lax	Keith Gordon, Andras Jones
Cruel Story of Youth (1960)	2 June 2015	David Desser, Linda Hoaglund	Miguel Rodriguez
Cruising (1980)	21 January 2014	Don Scardino, Randy Jurgensen, Travis Mathews	Jeffrey Schwarz
Crumbs (2015)	9 December 2020	Miguel Llanso	Mark Begley, Chris Stachiw
CSA: Confederate States of America (2004)	7 August 2012	Kevin Willmott	
Cube (1997)	15 February 2012	Vincenzo Natali	Rod Lott
Cut-Throats Nine (1972)	5 August 2026		Nicholas Schlegel, Heather Drain
Cuties (2020)	12 May 2021		Judith Mayne, Angela Mac
Cutter's Way (1981)	24 November 2022	Jeffrey Alan Fiskin, Arthur Rosenberg, Ann Dusenberry, Lisa Eichhorn	Maitland McDonagh, Mike Watt
Dakan (1997)	18 August 2021		Spencer Seams, Chris Stachiw
Danger Diabolik (1968)	29 December 2022		Samm Deighan, Father Malone
Daratt (2006)	11 August 2021	Kenneth Harrow	Spencer Seams, Chris Stachiw
Dark City (1998)	17 June 2026		Rob St. Mary, Rob Spencer
The Dark Crystal (1982)	22 May 2018	Brian Jay Jones	Kat Ellinger, El Goro
The Dark Knight Rises (2012)	14 January 2026		Chris Stachiw, Spencer Parsons
Dark of the Sun (1968)	3 June 2026		Andrew Nette, Jedidiah Ayres
Darktown Strutters (1975)	14 September 2011	Trina Parks	
Daughters of Darkness (1971)	22 May 2019	Danielle Ouimet	Kat Ellinger, Heather Drain
Dawn of the Dead (1978)	13 October 2022	Gaylen Ross, John Amplas, Jon Towlson	Jamie Russell, Father Malone
Day of the Jackal (1973)	29 December 2023		Ian Brownell, Rich Edwards
The Day The Clown Cried (1972)	1 April 2011		
The Dead Eyes of London & Creature with the Blue Hand	1 April 2021		Nick Schlegel, Samm Deighan
Dead Heat (1988)	30 October 2019	Mark Goldblatt, Terry Black	Heather Drain, Noel Thingvall
Dead Man's Line (2018)	5 January 2026	Mark Enochs, Alan Berry	
Dead Ringer (1981)	13 April 2011	Allan F. Nicholls	
Deadbeat at Dawn (1988)	31 May 2011	Jim Van Bebber	Jason Buchanan
Deadheads (2011)	1 April 2014	Brett Pierce, Drew Pierce	Jamie Russell
Deadlock (1970)	22 July 2026		Jessica Shires, Spencer Parsons
Death Game Redux	22 May 2016	Dyan Traynor	
Death Game/Knock Knock	16 January 2016	Sondra Locke, Larry Spiegel, David Worth	Nicholas Schlegel
The Death of "Superman Lives": What Happened? (2015)	18 September 2015	Jon Schnepp, Holly Payne	Chris Cummins
Death of a Bureaucrat (1966)	5 March 2025		Cullen Gallagher, Rob St. Mary
Death Race 2000 (1975)	2 July 2013	Adam Spiegelman	
Death to Smoochy (2002)	16 December 2014	Adam Resnick, Danny Woodburn	Mike Sullivan
Decoy (1946)	15 November 2016		Maitland McDonagh, Christa Faust
Deep End (1970)	24 August 2018		Jonathan Owen, Alicia Malone
Deep Red (1975)	15 January 2013	Maitland McDonagh, Elena Past, Claudio Simonetti	
Demolition Man (1993)	10 May 2018	Peter M. Lenkov, Fred Dekker, Daniel Waters, David L. Snyder	Laura Helen Marks, Chris Bricklemyer
Demon Seed (1977)	9 February 2016	Gerrit Graham, Rebecca Umland, Sam Umland	Bill Ackerman, Maitland McDonagh
Demons (1970)	24 April 2024		Samm Deighan, Emily Intravia
Desperate Living (1977)	27 September 2011	Mink Stole, John Waters	
Detour (1945)	11 November 2014	Noah Isenberg	Richard Edwards
Detroit 9000 (1974)	11 September 2012	Arthur Marks, Alex Rocco	
Detroit Rock City (1999)	19 June 2018	James Campion, Tim Sullivan, Carl V. Dupre, Lin Shaye, Adam Rifkin	Heather Drain, Josh Stewart
Detroit Unleaded (2013)	1 November 2013	Rola Nashef	
Detropia (2012)	13 September 2012	Heidi Ewing, Florent Tillon, Philip Lauri	
The Devil in Miss Jones (1972)	29 October 2013	Georgina Spelvin, Gerard Damiano Jr.	Jill Nelson
The Devils (1971)	27 May 2014	Richard Crouse	Vincenzo Natali
Diamonds of the Night (1964)	11 September 2024		Heather Drain, Rob St. Mary
Dick & Harry	10 July 2014	Elijah Drenner, Sophie Huber	Steve Byrne
Dick Tracy (1990)	2 August 2016	Glenne Headly, Garyn G. Roberts, Dan Kampling	Jared Case, Frank Santopadre
Die Laughing (1980)	3 October 2019	Jeff Werner, Carel Struycken	David Kittredge, Maurice Bursztynski
The Discreet Charm of the Bourgeoisie (1972)	17 December 2013	John Baxter, Jean-Claude Carrière	
Dita Saxová (1968)	11 September 2018		Chris Stachiw
Django Kill... If You Live, Shoot! (1967)	18 December 2012	Kevin Grant	
Doctor Detroit (1983)	28 March 2017	Michael Pressman, Carl Gottlieb, Robert Boris, Glenne Headly	Heather Drain, Aaron Peterson
Don's Plum (2001)	1 June 2020	Dale Wheatley	Andrew J. Rausch, Mike Sullivan
Doomed!: The Untold Story of Roger Corman's The Fantastic Four (2015)	9 October 2016	Marty Langford, Carl Ciarfalio, Chris Gore	Rod Lott, Rob St. Mary
Double Indemnity (1944)	27 November 2019		Kat Ellinger, Keith Gordon
Doulos, Le (1962)	6 May 2020		Samm Deighan, Ken Stanley
Downtown (1975)	11 December 2024		Jessica Shires, Heather Drain
Dr. Caligari (1989)	15 September 2015	Stephen Sayadian, Jerry Stahl	Heather Drain
Dread Zeppelin - A Song of Hope (2024)	6 January 2025	Sharif Nakhleh, Jason USA	
The Driver (1978)	5 November 2025		Beth Accomando, Walter Chaw
du BEAT-e-o (1984)	20 November 2020	Marc Sheffler, Mark Wheaton, Alan Sacks	Heather Drain, Adam Spiegelman
Duck Soup (1933)	27 September 2016	Robert S. Bader, Robert Weide, Joseph Adamson	Rob St. Mary, Jon Cross
Duets (2000)	27 January 2021	John Byrum, Kevin Jones	Emily Intravia, Maurice Bursztynski
The Duke of Burgundy (2014)	10 March 2021	Peter Strickland	Samm Deighan, Jim Vendiola
Dumb and Dumber (1994)	26 March 2025	Bennett Yellin	Ryan Luis Rodriguez, John Walker
Dune (1984)	30 March 2011	Ed Naha	Chris Stachiw
Dune Part Two (2024)	9 March 2024	Max Evry	Chris Stachiw
The Dybbuk (1937)	3 May 2016	Yossi Chajes	Daniel Bird, John Walker
The Dying of the Light (2015)	29 May 2016	Peter Flynn	Chris Bricklemyer
The Ear (1970)	11 September 2019		Ben Buckingham, Martin Kessler
The Earrings of Madame de... (1953)	27 June 2018	Susan White	Paula Guthat, Ken Stanley
Eating Raoul (1982)	26 November 2013	Mary Woronov, Dick Blackburn, Susan Saiger, Jed Feuer	Adam Spiegelman
Ed Wood (1994)	13 April 2016	Larry Karaszewski, Mike Starr, Lydia Kavina, Andrew J. Rausch	Rob St. Mary, Steve Sholtes
Election Special	28 October 2014	Herschell Gordon Lewis, Harry Lennix	Josh Gravel
Electra Glide in Blue (1973)	20 December 2011	Rupert Hitzig, Bob Boris	
Elevator to the Gallows (1958)	17 November 2015	Nathan Southern, Jack Chambers	Jedidiah Ayres
Elvira, Mistress of the Dark (1988)	5 April 2016	Frank Collison, Sam Egan	Josh Hadley, John Pilate
Emperor of the North Pole (1973)	28 May 2019		Cullen Gallagher, Noel Thingvall
The Empire Strikes Back (1980)	2 June 2021	Peter Suschitzky, Paul Hirsch, Jim Bloom, Rebecca Harrison, J.W. Rinzler	Jamie Benning, Chris Bricklemyer
End of August at the Hotel Ozone (1967)	4 September 2019		Rahne Alexander, Kat Ellinger
Enemy Mine (1985)	12 August 2020	Barry Longyear, Richard Loncraine, Edward Khmara	Corinne Luz, Tim Luz
Entertaining Mr. Sloane (1970)	21 January 2026		Jonathan Owen, Rob St. Mary
The Entity (1982)	20 October 2015	Peter Tscherkassky, David Labiosa	Daniel Kremer
Entranced Earth (1967)	15 July 2020		Chris Stachiw, Ken Stanley
Equinox (1970)	4 December 2012	Mark Thomas McGee, Ben Ness	Ben Nes
Eros + Massacre (1969)	1 January 2020	Dick Stegewerns	Chris Stachiw, Samm Deighan
Escape from New York (1981)	3 May 2021	Nick Castle, Adrienne Barbeau, Joseph Alves	Aaron Peterson, Father Malone
Eternity and a Day (1998)	26 May 2021	Andrew Horton	John Atom, Agatha Luz
Evita (1996)	6 January 2021	Sir Tim Rice	Paul Mow, Todd Nathanson
The Executioner's Song (1982)	12 June 2024	Lawrence Schiller	Amanda Reyes, Mark Begley
Executive Action (1973)	19 November 2013	Donald Freed, Alex Cox, Joseph McBride	
Existenz (1999)	25 April 2017	Ernest Mathijs	Jessica Kramer, Dustin Kramer
Existo (1999)	1 November 2016	Coke Sams, Bruce Arntson, J. Clarke Gallivan, Justin Lloyd	Skizz Cyzyk, Scott Calonico
Exorcist II: The Heretic (1977)	21 September 2018	Brian Hoyle, Paul Talbot	David Kittredge, Samm Deighan
Exposure 36 (2022)	1 April 2026	Mackenzie G. Mauro	Ben Buckingham
The Exterminating Angel (1962)	18 June 2025		Rob St. Mary, Miguel Llanso
Eyes Wide Shut (1999)	23 December 2012	Alison Castle	Alexis Borelli
Eyes Wide Shut Redux	4 January 2023	Nathan Abrams, Robert P. Kolker	Matthew Asprey Gear, Rob St. Mary
Eyes Without a Face (1960)	5 July 2016	Kate Ince	Maitland McDonagh, Alexandra West
F for Fake (1973)	26 August 2020	Matthew Asprey Gear	Peter Flynn, Spencer Parsons
F/X Murder by Illusion (1986)	29 January 2019	Robert Mandel, Alan Ormsby, Cliff DeYoung	Adam Schartoff, Jedidiah Ayres
Face/Off (1997)	5 July 2023	Mike Werb, Michael Colleary	Samm Deighan, AJ Black
Fade to Black (1980)	9 October 2019	Dennis Christopher, Irwin Yablans, Craig Safan, Tim Thomerson	Heather Drain, Bill Ackerman
The Fall (2008)	29 August 2019	Ged Clarke	Maurice Bursztynski, Brian Hoyle
Falling Down (1993)	7 March 2018	Timothy Harris, Ebbe Roe Smith, Joel Schumacher	Jamey Duvall, Aaron Peterson
Fantastic Planet (1973)	17 January 2017		Vincenzo Natali, Jeffrey Babcock
Far From Home (1989)	2 November 2022	Meiert Avis, Tommy Lee Wallace, Paul Miller, Donald P. Borchers	Andras Jones, Bryan Connolly
Faster, Pussycat! Kill! Kill! (1965)	3 January 2017	Dean Defino, Jimmy McDonough	Beth Accomando, Miguel Rodriguez
Fat City (1972)	27 December 2018	Stacy Keach	Heather Drain, Jedidiah Ayres
Fatal Beauty (1987)	19 February 2025	Bill Svanoe, Tom Holland	Kevin Lehane, Rob St. Mary
Fear and Loathing in the Projection Booth	30 June 2015	Anita Thompson	
Fear, Anxiety and Depression (1989)	22 April 2026		Mike Sullivan, David Rodgers
The Feeling That the Time for Doing Something Has Passed (2023)	31 December 2025		Keith Gordon, Lisa Vandever
Fellini Satyricon (1969)	19 August 2014	John Baxter	Jim Tushinski
Female Trouble (1974)	11 March 2014	Mink Stole	
Fiend Without a Face (1958)	3 October 2018		Maitland McDonagh, Troy Howarth
The Fifth Element (1997)	31 July 2024	Robert Mark Kamen, Mark A. Mangini, John A. Amicarella	Paul Zimmerman, Galen Howard
The Fifth Horseman Is Fear (1965)	4 September 2018		Kat Ellinger, Ben Buckingham
The Fifth Seal (1976)	1 December 2023		Samm Deighan, Spencer Parsons
Fight Club (1999)	15 December 2021	Chuck Palahniuk, Ross Grayson Bell, Jim Uhls	Maitland McDonagh, Rob St. Mary
Figures in a Landscape (1970)	10 July 2018		Cullen Gallagher, Heather Drain
The Final Programme (1973)	8 September 2015	Michael Moorcock, Sarah Douglas	Eric Cohen
Fire Walk with Me Redux / Twin Peaks: The Return (2017)	25 October 2017	Chrysta Bell, Clare Nina Norelli	Christine Makepeace, John Walker
The First Nudie Musical (1976)	26 July 2016	Bruce Kimmel	Angela Mac, Trevor Gumbel
Flash Gordon (1980)	31 December 2021	John Walsh, Michael Allin	Chris Bricklemyer, Scott Weinberg
Flight to Fury (1964)	7 June 2011	Monte Hellman	
Flooding with Love for First Blood, Son	22 May 2012	Ted Kotcheff, Zachary Oberzan, David Morrell, Garth Jennings	
The Fly (1986)	18 March 2019	Emma Westwood, Stuart Cornfeld	Bill Ackerman, Samm Deighan
For Y'ur Height Only (1981)	12 March 2013	Andrew Leavold	
Forbidden Planet (1956)	7 August 2024		Mike Faloon, Lexy Van Dyke
Forbidden Zone (1981)	16 August 2011	Richard Elfman	Skizz Cyzyk
Forman Vs. Forman (2019)	18 September 2020	Helena Trestíková, Daniel Vadocký	
Four Murders Are Enough, Darling (1971)	20 September 2023		Cerise Howard, Rahne Alexander
Frankenhooker (1990)	29 February 2012	Frank Henenlotter	
Freaked (1993)	18 May 2011	Alex Winter, Tom Stern, Tim Burns, Megan Ward, Lee Arenberg	
Freddy Got Fingered (2001)	29 April 2026	Lauren Lloyd	Heather Drain, Rob St. Mary
Free Enterprise (1998)	4 May 2011	Robert Burnett	
Freejack (1992)	5 June 2012	Fredric Fritz	
Frenzy (1972)	13 March 2024		Rebecca McCallum, Ian Cooper
The Friends of Eddie Coyle (1973)	18 November 2020	Eric J. Peterson Andrew J. Rausch	Eric J. Peterson, Andrew J. Rausch
Fright Night (1985)	18 August 2011	Tom Holland	
The Frighteners (1996)	28 October 2020	Jeffrey Combs, Grant Major	Jeff Meyers, Chris Stachiw
The Frontier (2015)	14 November 2016	Oren Shai, Webb Wilcoxen	Jared Case
Fruit of Paradise (1969)	30 September 2020		Samm Deighan, Kat Ellinger
Fucktoys (2025)	31 March 2026	Annapurna Sriram	Payton McCarty-Simas, Rob St. Mary
Fuego (1969)	26 February 2020		Heather Drain, Rod Lott
Furiosa - A Mad Max Saga (2024)	29 May 2024		Chris Stachiw, Father Malone
Future Shock! The Story of 2000AD (2014)	2 February 2017	Paul Goodwin, Sean Hogan	Josh Hadley
Ganja & Hess (1973)	1 February 2023	Sam Waymon, Christopher Sieving	Heather Drain, Leon Chase
Gattaca (1997)	28 August 2018	Xander Berkeley	Chris Cummins, Skizz Cyzyk
Get Carter	30 December 2015	Mike Hodges, George Armitage, Stephen Kay, John C. McGinley	Eric Zaldivar, Maitland McDonagh
Get Rollin' (1980)	13 February 2019		Benjamin Buxton, Leon Chase
The Getaway (1972)	6 November 2018		Maitland McDonagh, Aaron Carruthers
The Ghastly Love of Johnny X (2012)	2 May 2012	Paul Bunnell, Reggie Bannister, Will Keenan	
Ghost Dog: The Way of the Samurai	3 November 2015	Tim Palmer, Sara Piazza	Peter Rozovsky
Gingers Girls and Little Fishes	19 April 2014	Alexia Anastasio	
The Girl on a Broomstick (1972)	1 September 2021	Hermína Franková, Hanna Frank	Kat Ellinger, Gil Kenan
Glengarry Glen Ross (1992)	23 June 2015	James Foley, Ed Harris	Chris Stachiw
Gloria (1980)	2 July 2025		Judith Mayne, Andrew Rausch
Go for Sisters	7 November 2013	John Sayles	
Godzilla vs. Kong (2021)	3 April 2021	Chris Stachiw	Chris Stachiw
Gone in Sixty Seconds (1974)	28 May 2021		Chris Stachiw, El Goro
The Good Fairy (1935)	2 April 2026		Rahne Alexander, Federico Bertolini
Good Hair (2009)	8 October 2013	David Humphries, Espy Thomas, Jennifer Thomas	
Goto, Island of Love (1964)	22 April 2020		Daniel Bird, Kat Ellinger
Grace of My Heart (1996)	25 April 2012	Illeana Douglas	Skizz Cyzyk
The Graduate (1967)	1 July 2024	Beverly Gray	Keith Gordon, Katharine Coldiron
Grande Illusion, La (1937)	16 April 2017	Nick Macdonald	Tom Jennings, Ken Stanley
The Greasy Strangler (2016)	11 November 2016	Jim Hosking	Skizz Cyzyk
The Great Silence (1968)	14 July 2021		Maitland McDonagh, Ivo Ritzer
Gremlins (1984)	13 August 2013	Joe Dante	Chris Cummins
The Grifters (1990)	6 December 2024	Peggy Rajski, Barbara De Fina	Jedidiah Ayres, Andrew Nette
The Gumball Rally (1976)	24 August 2022	Nicholas Pryor	Father Malone, Chris Stachiw
Hackers (1995)	16 July 2013	Renoly Santiago, Iain Softley	
Hair (1979)	13 January 2021	Michael Weller, Miles Chapin	Gil Kenan, Lee Gambin
Hamburger: The Motion Picture (1986)	2 December 2014	Mike Marvin	Stephen Sajdak
Happy End (1966)	26 September 2017		Ben Buckingham, Kat Ellinger
Hard to Be a God (2013)	26 April 2016	Daniel Bird	Carol Borden, Travis Crawford
Hard-Boiled (1992)	5 May 2021		Beth Accomando, Jess Byard
The Haunting of Julia (1977)	25 September 2012	Richard Loncraine, Peter Straub	Kier-la Janisse
Haxan (1922)	26 October 2015	Robert Thurston	
Head (1968)	11 May 2011	Eric Lefcowitz, Monte Hellman	
Head-On (2004)	4 March 2026		Rahne Alexander, Keith Gordon
Heaven (1998)	1 April 2019	Daniel Edwards, Jeremy Birchall, Chad Taylor	David Kittredge, Spencer Parsons
Heroic Purgatory (1970)	17 April 2024		Axel Kohagen, Earl Jackson
Hickey & Boggs (1972)	9 November 2011	Richard Edwards, Joe Robin	
The Hidden (1987)	9 August 2016	Jack Sholder	Jamie Sammons, Eric J. Peterson
High & Low (1963)	2 November 2011		Coffin Jon
Highlander (1986)	6 December 2016	Russell Mulcahy, Gregory Widen	Mike Thompson, Josh Hadley
Hit & Stay (2013)	25 June 2013	Joe Tropea, Skizz Cyzyk	
Hit! (1973)	11 February 2014	Sidney J. Furie	Daniel Kremer
The Hitcher (1986)	14 March 2012	Rutger Hauer, Robert Harmon	Brian Kelly, Josh Johnson
Hollywood Bulldogs (2021)	23 July 2021	Jon Spira	
The Holy Mountain (1973)	8 July 2014	Heatherleigh Navarre	Stephen Scarlata
Homicidal (1961)	6 October 2015		Jeffrey Schwarz
An Honest Liar (2014)	11 April 2012	Justin Weinstein, Tyler Measom	
Horrors of Malformed Men (1969)	29 January 2020		Jess Byard, Ben Buckingham
The Hourglass Sanatorium (1973)	28 April 2020		Jonathan Owen, Spencer Parsons
House (1977)	12 July 2016		Rob St. Mary, Miguel Rodriguez
House Party (1990)	6 February 2019	Reginald Hudlin	Jay Scott Smith, Patrick Bromley
How to Drown Dr. Mracek, the Lawyer (1975)	29 September 2023		Rahne Alexander, Spenser Parsons
The Howling (1981)	21 May 2013	Joe Dante, Gary Brandner	Josh Hadley
Hudson Hawk (1991)	26 January 2016	Daniel Waters	Stephen Scarlata, Jamey Duvall
The Hudsucker Proxy (1994)	22 May 2024		Rahne Alexander, David Kittredge
Human Highway (1982)	17 May 2023	Charlotte Stewart	Darren Williams, Heather Drain
The Hunger (1983)	26 October 2022	Whitley Strieber, Michael Thomas	Christine Makepeace, Kat Ellinger
Hush... Hush, Sweet Charlotte (1964)	27 August 2025		Tim Madigan, Otto Bruno
I Am Divine (2013)	30 July 2013	Jeffrey Schwarz, Mink Stole	
I Am Not a Witch (2017)	25 August 2021		Samm Deighan, Spencer Seams
I Can't Sleep (1994)	16 February 2022		Judith Mayne, Cullen Gallagher
I Married a Monster from Outer Space (1958)	24 June 2026		Bill Ackerman, Ben Buckingham
I Saw the TV Glow (2024)	25 March 2026		Lu Etienne, Maxi Breckwoldt
I'm Gonna Git You Sucka (1988)	14 July 2017	Antonio Fargas, Peter McCarthy	Chris Cummins
Ice Harvest (2005)	23 December 2014	Scott Phillips	
The Ice Pirates (1984)	25 January 2023	Stewart Raffill, Bruce Vilanch	Duane Swierczynski, Chris Stachiw
Idiocracy (2006)	9 December 2014	Luke Wilson	Jeff Wattrick
If.... (1968), O Lucky Man! (1973) and Britannia Hospital (1982) (Mick Travis Trilogy)	16 December 2020	David Wood	Jonathan Owen, Samm Deighan
The Image (1975)	17 December 2025	Rob King, Lina Mannheimer	Jessica Shires, Heather Drain
In a Lonely Place (1950)	18 November 2014	Patrick McGilligan, Steven Rybin, Will Scheibel, Steve Anderson	Jared Case
In My Skin (2002)	8 October 2025		Axel Kohagen, Ben Buckingham
The Incredible 2-Headed Transplant (1971)	31 October 2024		Agatha Luz, Tim Luz
The Incredible Shrinking Man (1957)	27 July 2022		Emily Intravia, John Atom
Intacto (2001)	22 August 2017	Andrés M. Koppel	Jamey Duvall, Heather Drain
Intimate Lighting (1965)	21 November 2022		Spencer Parsons, Matthew Asprey Gear
The Intruder (1962)	20 January 2017	Jason V. Brock	Elric Kane, Chris Stachiw
Invasion of the Body Snatchers (1956)	3 September 2013	Mark McGee	Jamie Jenkins
Is There Sex After Death? (1971)	10 February 2021	Jeanne Abel, Jenny Abel	Skizz Cyzyk, Heather Drain
The Island of Lost Souls (1932)	4 October 2023		Ian Brownell, Tim Luz
It Happened Here (1964)	24 July 2019	Peter Suschitzky	Wynter Tyson, Caelum Vatnsdal
The Italian Connection (1972)	30 November 2011		Mike Malloy
Jacob's Ladder (1990)	24 March 2023	Bruce Joel Rubin, Adrian Lyne	Stephen Scarlata, Yaniv Eidelstein
Jaws (1975)	28 August 2020	Carl Gottlieb, John LeMay	Jamie Benning, Chris Sasser
Jesus Christ Vampire Hunter (2001)	8 April 2014	Lee Demarbre, Ian Driscoll	
Jodorowsky's Dune (2013)	1 May 2014	Stephen Scarlata	
John Badham on Directing	5 May 2014	John Badham	
John Dies at the End (2012)	6 June 2017	Glynn Turman	Thomas Barker, Chris Stachiw
Johnny Guitar (1954)	21 February 2024		Andras Jones, David Kittredge
Johnny Mnemonic (1995)	26 July 2023	Robert Longo	Duane Swierczynski, Dahlia Schweitzer
The Joke (1969)	18 September 2019		Kat Ellinger, Spencer Parsons
Joker - Folie à Deux (2024)	11 October 2024		Chris Stachiw
Josie and the Pussycats (2001)	15 November 2023		Emily Intravia, Chris Cummins
Joysticks (1983)	14 March 2017	Greydon Clark, Jon Gries	Chris Cummins, Heather Drain
Jubilee Hitchhiker (2012)	10 July 2012	William Hjortsberg	
Juliet of the Spirits (1965)	20 January 2015	John Baxter	Jim Tushinski
Jumpin' Jack Flash (1986)	5 February 2025	David H. Franzoni	Kevin Lehane, Ian Brownell
Just One of the Guys (1985)	8 December 2021	Lisa Gottlieb	Rahne Alexander, Jim Laczkowski
Kamikaze 1989 (1982)	18 December 2024		Heather Drain, Chris Stachiw
The Keep (1983)	18 October 2023	Hawk Koch, F. Paul Wilson, Ivo Ritzer	John Walker, Jedidiah Ayres
Kelly's Heroes (1970)	7 April 2021	John Landis, Stuart Margolin, Gavin MacLeod	Samm Deighan, Bill Ackerman
Kenneth Anger's Magick Lantern Cycle (1947-81)	6 September 2011	Michelle Clifford	
Khrustalyov, My Car! (1998)	19 May 2021	Jonathan Brent, Guy Seligmann	Gianna D’Emilio, Spencer Parsons
Kill Me Again (1989)	26 August 2026	John Dahl, David Warfield	Jedidiah Ayres, Rob Spencer
The Killer (1989)	11 October 2011	Kenneth Hall	
The Killer (1989) - Redux	1 December 2025		Jackie Stargrove, Carol Borden
Killer Party (1986)	16 October 2016	Barney Cohen	Jim Laczkowski, Kat Ellinger
Killing Mr. Devil (1970)	13 September 2023		Kat Ellinger, Jonathan Owen
Kin-Dza-Dza (1986)	25 December 2019		Dan Martin, Jen Handorf
King Cohen: The Wild World of Filmmaker Larry Cohen (2017)	2 January 2018	Steve Mitchell, Larry Cohen	
The King of Comedy (1982)	6 May 2014	Shawn Levy	Skizz Cyzyk
The King of Marvin Gardens (1972)	17 June 2014	Ellen Burstyn	
Kings and Desperate Men (1981)	24 July 2018	Andrea Marcovicci, Arden R. Ryshpan	Daniel Kremer, Jonathan Marlow
Kiss Kiss Bang Bang (2005)	15 April 2020	Shane Black	Jedidiah Ayres, Andrew Nette
Kiss Me Deadly (1955)	13 February 2018	Max Allan Collins	Kevin Heffernan, Andrew Nette
Kiss Meets the Phantom of the Park (1978)	5 February 2013	Terry Morse Jr., Ron Albanese	John Stockwell
Kissed (1996)	4 April 2017	Barbara Gowdy, Lynne Stopkewich, Molly Parker, Gregory Middleton	Rob St. Mary, Axel Kohagen
Knife in the Water (1962)	1 April 2020		Samm Deighan, Spencer Parsons
Korla (2015)	17 July 2016	John Turner, Eric Christensen	Rob St. Mary
Kraven the Hunter (2024)	19 December 2024		Father Malone, Chris Stachiw
Krull (1983)	17 July 2019	Peter Suschitzky	Samm Deighan, Noel Thingvall
L'Age d'or (1930)	29 March 2023		Rob St. Mary, Robert Bellissimo
L'Amour fou (1969)	11 March 2020		Samm Deighan, Jonathan Owen
L.A. Confidential (1997)	27 February 2018	James Ellroy	Richard Edwards, Eric Cohen
La Haine (1995)	23 April 2025	Ginette Vincendeau	Judith Mayne, Lumi Etienne
The Lady from Shanghai (1947)	17 November 2021		Spencer Parsons, Peter Flynn
The Langoliers (1995)	3 December 2025	Tom Holland, Aristotelis Maragkos	Joe Maddrey, Marta Djordjevic
The Last Action Hero (1993)	20 September 2011	Sam U. Rai	
Last Action Hero: Round Two	28 October 2011	Sam U. Rai	Sam U. Rai
The Last Dragon (1985)	5 January 2016	Taimak, Christopher Murney, Mike Starr, Louis Venosta, Rupert Hitzig	Julian Boyance, Chris Cummins
The Last Movie (1971)	16 August 2018	Craig Rogers, David Marriott, John Buck Wilkin, Jessica Hundley, Nick Ebeling, Satya de la Manitou	Ben Buckingham, Nick Dawson
The Last Seduction (1994)	19 March 2013	John Dahl	
The Last Starfighter (1984)	31 December 2012	Lance Guest, Catherine Mary Stewart	Chris Bricklemyer
The Last Supper (1995)	10 May 2023	Jonathan Penner, Dan Rosen	Rob St. Mary, Martin Kessler
The Last Temptation of Christ (1988)	26 March 2013	Michael Ballhaus, Darren J. N. Middleton	
Last Year at Marienbad (1961)	13 May 2020		Samm Deighan, Jim Vendiola
Latitude Zero (1969)	24 July 2024		Carol Borden, Walter Chaw
The Laughing Woman (1969)	12 February 2020		Kat Ellinger, Elric Kane
The Legend of Boggy Creek (1972)	29 May 2012	Dave Coleman	
Lemon Popsicle (1978)	20 December 2016	Boaz Davidson, Zachi Noy, Diane Franklin	Oren Shai, Heather Drain
Lemonade Joe (1964)	17 September 2025		Jonathan Owen, Alistair Pitts
Let the Right One In (2008)	19 October 2022		Chris Bricklemyer, Kyler Fey
Let's Scare Jessica to Death (1971)	14 October 2014	John D. Hancock, Lee Kalcheim	Cameron Cloutier
The Life and Deaths of Christopher Lee (2024)	19 September 2024	Jon Spira	
Life of Brian (1979)	12 August 2014	Roger Christian, Will Yapp, Owen Harris	Ken Stanley
The Limey (1999)	14 July 2015	Mark Gallagher, Anthony Kaufman	
Linda Linda Linda (2005)	15 September 2025	Chance Huskey	
The Lion Has Seven Heads (1970)	29 July 2020		Chris Stachiw, Heather Drain
Lips of Blood (1973)	27 May 2020		Samm Deighan, Maitland McDonagh
Liquid Sky (1982)	21 October 2014	Slava Tsukerman	Skizz Cyzyk
Little Orphan Dusty (1978)	23 March 2022	Rhonda Jo Petty	Jill Nelson, Rahne Alexander
Local Hero (1983)	8 December 2022	Peter Riegert	Jonathan Melville, Rob St. Mary
Logan's Run (1976)	7 April 2015	William F. Nolan, George Clayton Johnson	Eric Cohen
Lone Wolf & Cub Saga	31 December 2016	Marc Walkow	Geoff Todd, Axel Kohagen
The Long Goodbye (1973)	27 November 2018	Elliott Gould	Terry Frost, Eric Cohen
Looker (1981)	2 February 2016		Marjorie Conrad, Heather Drain
Lost Highway (1997)	27 November 2021	Barry Gifford	Bill Ackerman, Jedidiah Ayres
The Lost One (1951)	24 May 2017	Stephen Youngkin	Samm Deighan, Daniel Bird
Love & Death (1975)	22 January 2013	Keith Gordon	
Love Circle (1969)	12 March 2025		Spencer Parsons, David A Heath
The Love Witch (2016)	10 July 2016	Anna Biller	Heather Drain
Loves of a Blonde (1966)	30 September 2019		Samm Deighan, Kevin Heffernan
The Lure (2015)	17 November 2017	Mermaid Cindy, John Athanason	Carol Borden, David Rodgers
M (1931)	23 April 2019		Samm Deighan, Jamey Duvall
The Mack (1973)	7 August 2018		Jon Cross, Moe Porne
Macunaíma (1969)	22 July 2020		David Kittredge, Chris Stachiw
Mad Dog Time (1996)	20 August 2021	Larry Bishop, Dina Lipton	Bryan Connolly, Andras Jones
Mad Love (1935)	3 October 2017	Gregory W. Mank, Stephen D. Youngkin	Samm Deighan
The Mad Max Series	15 May 2019	Roger Ward, Vernon Wells, Virginia Hey, Bruce Spence, Luke Buckmaster, Hugh Keays-Byrne	Mike Thompson, Ben Buckingham
The Mafu Cage (1978)	13 September 2016	Karen Arthur	Kier-La Janisse, Josh Johnson
The Magic Garden of Stanley Sweetheart (1970)	3 June 2020	Robert T. Westbrook, Linda Gillen, Brandon Maggart	Daniel Kremer, Jarrod Labine
The Magnificent Ambersons (1942)	4 December 2013	William Friedkin, Joseph McBride, Christopher Welles Feder, Peter Bogdanovich, Jonathan Rosenbaum	Roger L. Ryan, Rob St. Mary, Justin Bozung
Maîtresse (1976)	1 March 2023		Jim Vendiola, Samm Deighan
Making Mr. Right (1987)	7 March 2017	Susan Seidelman, Ann Magnuson, Glenne Headly, Laurie Frank, Floyd Byars	Beth Accomando, Miguel Rodriguez
Malpertuis (1971)	16 October 2024	Harry Kümel	Jessica Shires, Matthew Asprey Gear
The Maltese Falcon (1941)	20 February 2018		Richard Edwards, Eric Cohen
Man Bites Dog (1992)	11 October 2023		Rob St. Mary
A Man for All Seasons (1966)	7 July 2025		Spencer Parsons, Robert Bellissimo
Man from Earth (2007)	18 October 2011	Richard Schenkman, Emerson Bixby	
The Man in the White Suit (1951)	21 December 2022	Robert Sellers	Mark Begley, A.J. Black
Man on a Swing (1974)	3 April 2018	Justin Bozung	Dennis Tafoya, Scout Tafoya
The Man Who Fell to Earth (1976)	4 December 2019	Candy Clark, Samuel J. Umland, Susan Compo	Skizz Cyzyk, Samm Deighan
The Man Who Shot Liberty Valance (1962)	3 May 2018	Kenneth E. Hall, Joseph McBride	Jon Cross, Ben Buckingham
Mandingo (1975)	14 March 2018		Paul Talbot, Greg Klymkiw
Manhunter (1986)	10 June 2014	Tom Noonan, Chris Elliott, Adam Resnick, Jonathan Rayner	Mister X
Manos: The Hands of Fate (1966)	27 January 2012	Benjamin Solovey	
Marge, La (1976)	2 August 2017	Jeremy Richey, Noël Véry, Michael Levy	Daniel Bird, Samm Deighan
Marketa Lazarova (1967)	19 September 2018		Kat Ellinger, Samm Deighan
Marnie (1964)	24 January 2018	Tony Lee Moral, Tippi Hedren	Tania Modleski, Susan White
Martin (1978)	9 April 2013	Mike Mayo	Edward G. Pettit
Martyrs (2008)	18 October 2016		Alexandra West, Elric Kane
Mary & Max (2009)	24 February 2021	Adam Elliot	Maurice Bursztynski
Massacre at Central High (1976)	23 August 2016	Derrel Maury, Rex Sikes, Jeffrey Winner, Robert Carradine, Andrew Stevens	Heather Drain, Doug Tilley
Massacre Time (1966)	8 July 2026		Spencer Parsons, Joe Odber
Matalo! (1970)	7 July 2021		Cullen Gallagher, Chris Stachiw
Matilda (1978)	15 April 2026	Timothy Galfas, Albert S. Ruddy, Gary Morgan, Elliott Gould	Cullen Gallagher, Mike Sullivan
The Matrix (1999)	1 December 2021		Christine Makepeace, Ben Buckingham
Me and Him (1988)	21 March 2019	Doris Dörrie	Adam Spiegelman, Heather Drain
Mean Guns (1997)	27 March 2012	Albert Pyun	
The Medusa Touch (1978)	27 October 2021		Jeff Meyers, Agatha Luz
Megalopolis (2024)	26 December 2025		Mike Thompson, Rob St. Mary
Memoirs of an Invisible Man (1992)	24 December 2025		Chris Stachiw, Mark Begley
Memories Within Miss Aggie (1974)	2 March 2022		Ashley West, Samm Deighan
The Mephisto Waltz (1971)	20 October 2021	Jacqueline Bisset	Rahne Alexander, Andrew Nette
Message from the Future (AKA Sheder Min Ha'Atid) (1981)	24 March 2015	Oded Carmeli	Yaniv Eidelstein
Messiah of Evil (1973)	31 October 2019	Willard Huyck	Maitland McDonagh, Bill Ackerman
Metropolis (1927)	14 July 2025		Ranjit Sandhu, Federico Bertolini
Miami Blues (1990)	9 May 2012	Scott Phillips	
Midnight Cowboy (1969)	4 March 2024	Glenn Frankel	Jon Towlson, Chris Stachiw
Milius (2013)	21 April 2014	Joey Figueroa	
Millennium (1989)	18 December 2019		Chris Bricklemyer, Jedidiah Ayres
Millennium Actress (2001)	10 April 2024		Earl Jackson, El Goro
Mimesis (2011)	27 September 2012	Douglas Schulze, Sid Haig	
Minority Report (2002)	12 June 2019	Scott Frank	Corinne Luz, Tim Luz
Miracle Mile (1988)	3 March 2015	Steve De Jarnatt, O-Lan Jones	David J. Moore
The Miracle of Morgan's Creek (1944)	16 May 2024	Stuart Klawans	Ian Brownell, Otto Bruno
Mission Caligula (2018)	23 July 2018	Kelly Holland, Alexander Tuschinski	Maitland McDonagh, Rob St. Mary
Mock Up on Mu (2008)	27 May 2013	Craig Baldwin, Adam Parfrey	
Mommie Dearest (1981)	10 May 2017	Rutanya Alda, Justin Bozung	Terry Frost, Joshua Grannell
More American Graffiti (1979)	8 September 2019	Bill Norton, Candy Clark Willard Huyck	Terry Frost, Trevor Gumbel
Morgana (2019)	13 August 2020	Josie Hess, Isabel Peppard, Morgana Muses	Lisa Vandever, Kevin Heffernan
Morgiana (1972)	16 September 2020		Kat Ellinger, Ben Buckingham
Morons from Outer Space (1985)	3 August 2022	Griff Rhys Jones	Jon Spira, Cecil Trachenburg
Motel Hell (1980)	21 October 2020	Kevin Connor, Frank Cotolo	Heather Drain, Ben Buckingham
Mother Night (1996)	24 June 2014	Robert Weide, Gregory D. Sumner, Mary Kenny	Keith Gordon
Mothra (1961)	27 November 2012	Stuart Galbraith IV, Peter H. Brothers	
Move (1970)	26 May 2025	Paula Prentiss, Elliot Gould	Mike Sullivan, Emily Intravia
Mr. Freedom (1968)	1 October 2013	Alison Smith	Phil Hall
The Mr. Vampire Series	23 October 2018		Samm Deighan, El Goro
Mulholland Drive (2001)	8 November 2016	Laura Harring, Patrick Fischler	Jedidiah Ayres, Erik Marshall
Murder by Decree (1979)	26 April 2023	S. Brent Morris, Susan Clark	David MacGregor, Aaron Peterson
Murder Czech Style (1967)	6 September 2023		Kat Ellinger, Jonathan Owen
Murder My Sweet (1944)	13 November 2018	Tom Williams	Terry Frost, Eric Cohen
My Man Godfrey (1936)	13 April 2022	Kat Ellinger. Maurice Bursztynski	Kat Ellinger, Maurice Bursztynski
Myra Breckinridge (1970)	17 September 2013	Jay Parini, Nicholas D. Wrathall	Juniper Moore
The Mysterious Castle in the Carpathians (1981)	27 September 2023	Tereza Brdeckova, Irena Kovarova	Jonathan Owen, Emily Barney
Naked (1993)	28 August 2024		Elinor Lewy, Nick Kujawa
The Naked Gun (2025)	23 September 2025		Mark Begley, Chris Stachiw
The Naked Kiss (1964)	8 November 2023	Michael Dante, Constance Towers	Philip Marinello, Spencer Parsons
Near Dark (1987)	9 July 2013	Lance Henriksen, Mike Mayo	
Never Cry Wolf (1983)	17 March 2021	John Houston, Sam Hamm, Richard Kletter, Eugene Corr, Michael Chandler, Hiro Narita	Chris Stachiw, Matthew Socey
Never Too Young to Die (1986)	28 February 2017	Gil Bettman, David Worth, Peter Kwong	Heather Drain, Josh Stewart
New Wave Hookers (1985)	1 April 2022		Ashley West, Robin Bougie
Night Moves (1975)	28 July 2015	Nat Segaloff	Carol Borden
Night of the Comet (1984)	8 March 2016	Thom Eberhardt, Catherine Mary Stewart, Kelli Maroney	Angela Mac, Jon Abrams
Night of the Creeps (1986)	4 October 2016	Fred Dekker, Tom Atkins	Heather Drain, Maitland McDonagh
The Night of the Following Day (1969)	2 August 2023		Adam Schartoff, Joseph Aisenberg
The Night Porter (1974)	7 September 2022	Gaetana Marrone	Emma Westwood, Kat Ellinger
Nightbreed (1990)	9 October 2020	Charles Haid	Samm Deighan, Tim Luz
Nightdreams (1981)	4 April 2012	Susie Bright	
Nightmare Alley (1947)	9 November 2022		Samm Deighan, Andrew Nette
Nineteen Eighty Four (1984)	28 May 2017	Michael Radford	Samm Deighan, Emily Intravia
Ninotchka (1939)	24 May 2023	Joseph McBride	Otto Bruno, Robert Bellissimo
The Ninth Configuration (1980)	16 May 2017	Stacy Keach	Samm Deighan, Heather Drain
The Ninth Gate (1999)	14 December 2022		Matthew Asprey Gear, A.J. Black
No Retreat, No Surrender (1986)	1 July 2014	Keith W. Strandberg	Zachary Oberzan
The North Avenue Irregulars (1979)	12 January 2022	Bruce Bilson, Don Tait, Edward Herrmann	David Kittredge, Rod Lott
Nothing Lasts Forever (1984)	12 May 2015	Tom Schiller, Lauren Tom, Michael Streeter, Laila Nabulsi	Skizz Cyzyk
The November Men (1993)	28 June 2023	Paul Williams	Paul Cronin, Andras Jones
O Pagador de Promessas (1962)	25 June 2025		Robert Bellissimo, Philip Marinello
Office Killer (1997)	5 October 2022	Tom Kalin	Dahlia Schweitzer, Chris Stachiw
Oil Lamps (1971)	22 September 2021		Jonathan Owen, Kat Ellinger
Old School Gangstas 2	10 January 2014	Fred "The Hammer" Williamson	
Oldboy (2003)	11 September 2020		Bill Ackerman, John Atom
The Omega Man (1971)	3 July 2019	Joyce Hooper Corrington, Mark Protosevich	Andrew Nette, Maurice Bursztynski
On the Beach (1959)	16 April 2025		Jonathan Melville, Maurice Bursztynski
On the Silver Globe (1988)	27 June 2017	Daniel Bird	Heather Drain, Joe Yanick
Once Upon a Time in the West (1968)	6 January 2015	Sir Christopher Frayling	Josh Johnson
One-Eyed Jacks (1961)	1 June 2017	Toby Roan	Paul Zimmerman, Jamey Duvall
The Opening of Misty Beethoven (1976)	23 April 2013	Steven Morowitz, Veronica Hart	
Orgazmo (1997)	11 January 2023	Toddy Walters, Jason McHugh	David Rodgers, Brad Jones
Orgy of the Dead (1965)	28 January 2014	Andrew Rausch	
The Original Sin (1948)	10 January 2024		Samm Deighan, Emily Intravia
Othello (1951)	23 September 2014	Samantha White	Joseph McBride
The Other Side of the Wind	5 May 2015	Josh Karp, Joseph McBride	Andrew Rausch
The Other Side of the Wind: Redux	11 May 2019	Bob Murawski, Joseph McBride, Josh Karp	Ken Stanley, Rob St. Mary
The Outfit (1973)	28 July 2026		Gary Phillips, Jedidiah Ayres
Outland (1981)	2 May 2019	James B. Sikking	Jedidiah Ayres, Josh Hadley
Over the Edge (1979)	25 June 2017	Charlie Haas, Tim Hunter, Vincent Spano, Andy Romano, Harry Northup	Heather Drain, Leon Chase
The Ox-Bow Incident (1943)	28 February 2024	Carl Rollyson	Angela Mac, Ian Brownell
Pandemonium (1982)	5 March 2021	Miles Chapin, Alfred Sole, Jamie Klein, Richard Whitley	Rod Lott, Gary Hill
Pandemonium (1987)	11 February 2026	Haydn Keenan	Heather Drain, Payton McCarty-Simas
Panic in Year Zero! (1962)	6 August 2025		Emily Intravia, Howard A. Rodman
The Parallax View (1974)	15 August 2018	William Daniels, Bonnie Bartlett, Barna William Donovan, Shane O’Sullivan	Chris Stachiw, Jess Byard
The Passover Plot (1976)	18 April 2019		Spencer Parsons, Chris Bricklemyer
Pastoral: To Die in the Country (1974)	6 November 2012	Steven C. Ridgely	
Pat Garrett & Billy the Kid (1973)	18 January 2018	Rudy Wurlitzer, David Wolf, Paul Seydor	David Lambert, Mike Faloon
Peeping Tom (1960)	8 January 2013	Laura Mulvey, Adam Lowenstein	
Performance (1970)	23 December 2022	Sam Umland, Keiron Pim	Maitland McDonagh, Ben Slater
Perfume: The Story of a Murderer (2006)	13 March 2019	Andrew Birkin	David Kittredge, Josh Stewart
Phantom of the Paradise (1974)	30 August 2011	Jessica Harper	Ari the Archivist
Phase IV (1974)	8 December 2015	Michael Murphy, Mayo Simon, Brian Gascoigne	Robert Hubbard, Josh Hadley
Phynx. The (1970)	2 December 2020	Bob Booker, Lou Antonio, Larry Hankin	Mike Sullivan, Terry Frost
The Piano Teacher (2001)	10 August 2018	Christian Berger	Jared Bauer, Chris Stachiw
Pin (1988)	23 October 2016	Caelum Vatnsdal, Sandor Stern, Andrew Neiderman, Cynthia Preston	Paul Corupe, Elric Kane
Pink Narcissus (1971)	17 June 2020		Maitland McDonagh, David Kittredge
Pitfall (1948)	6 November 2024		Philip Marinello, Ian Brownell
Planet of the Apes (1968)	9 June 2021		Edward G. Pettit, Richard Hatem
Planet of the Vampires (1965)	15 July 2014		Troy Howarth
The Plastic Dome of Norma Jean (1966)	27 January 2023	Juleen Compton	Richard Hatem, Jim Donahue
Plump Fiction (1997)	24 August 2019	Bob Koherr	Chis Gore, Mike Sullivan
Point Blank (1967)	10 November 2021		Jedidiah Ayres, Andrew Nette
Poison (1991)	1 January 2025		Rahne Alexander, Kyler Fey
Poltergeist (1982)	7 October 2020	Dahlia Schweitzer, Chris O'Neill, Oliver Robins, Mark Victor, Gary Sherman, Gil Kenan	Christine Makepeace, Vincenzo Natali
Pontypool (2008)	25 October 2016	Bruce McDonald, Tony Burgess	Maurice Bursztynski
Pootie Tang (2001)	22 June 2022		Mike McGranahan, Josh Stewart
Popeye (1980)	8 June 2022	Allan F. Nicholls, Paul Dooley, MacIntyre Dixon	Paul Zimmerman, Father Malone
Porcile (1969)	15 January 2020		Jonathan Owen, Ken Stanley
Possession (1981)	20 May 2014	Frederic Tuten, Daniel Bird	Chris Bricklemyer
The Postman (1997)	1 July 2026		Emily Intravia, Carol Borden
Pound (1970)	1 November 2023		Spencer Parsons, Rob St. Mary
Pretty Poison (1968)	7 June 2023		Darren Williams, Bill Ackerman
Prime Cut (1972)	16 April 2013	Cameron Ashley	
The Private Life of Sherlock Holmes (1970)	5 April 2023	Aaron Peterson. David MacGregor	Aaron Peterson, David MacGregor
Psycho (1960)	11 December 2018	Alexandre Philippe	Christine Makepeace
The Public Image is Rotten (2018)	13 September 2018	Martin Atkins, Bill Laswell, Tabbert Fiiller	Skizz Cyzyk, Chris Cummins
Pump Up the Volume (1990)	23 February 2016	Allan Moyle	Rob St. Mary
Punisher: War Zone (2008)	9 July 2015	Lexi Alexander, Gerry Conway, Doug Hutchison	Adam Spiegelman
Punishment Park (1971)	13 January 2012	Joseph A. Gomez, Jon Dieringer	
Purple Rain (1984)	6 March 2024	Alan Light	Bill Ackerman, Samm Deighan
Putney Swope (1968)	21 March 2012	Robert Downey	
Puzzle of a Downfall Child (1970)	7 February 2017	Jerry Schatzberg, Barry Primus	Bill Ackerman, Daniel Kremer
The Quiet Earth (1985)	10 March 2015	Geoff Murphy, Sam Pillsbury, Jonathan Rayner	Keith Gordon
QWERTY (2012)	6 September 2012	Bill Sebastian, Nat Dykeman	
R100 (2013)	3 April 2024		Samm Deighan, Jim Vendiola
Radio On (1979)	23 August 2024	Chris Petit	Ben Slater, Mark Begley
Raiders!: The Story of the Greatest Fan Film Ever Made (2015)	3 July 2016	Tim Skousen, Jeremy Coon	Rod Lott
Raising Arizona (1987)	31 May 2023	Joseph McBride	Keith Gordon, Rob St. Mary
Rancho Notorious (1952)	7 February 2024		Otto Bruno, Jonathan Penner
Raw (2016)	15 October 2025	Barbara Creed	Suzen Tekla Kruglnska, Beth Accomando
Raw Force (1982)	24 July 2012	Frank E. Johnson	
Raw Talent (1984)	19 June 2012	Joyce Snyder, Larry Revene, Jerry Butler	
Real Genius (1985)	9 September 2022	Neal Israel, Gabriel Jarret, Jon Gries	Chris Bricklemyer, Ryan Luis Rodriguez
The Reckless Moment (1949)	13 November 2019	Lutz Bacher	Samm Deighan, Cullen Gallagher
Reconstituirea (1968)	27 May 2026	Radu Toderici	Andrei Idu, Spencer Parsons
The Red Circle (1970)	2 February 2022	Rui Nogueira	Samm Deighan, Andrew Leavold
Red Lights (2012)	22 January 2025		Rod Lott, Ryan Luis Rodiguez
Red Scorpion (1988)	6 April 2011	Dolph Lundgren	
The Red Shoes (1948)	20 April 2017		Daniel Bird, Maitland McDonagh
The Rep (2012)	11 June 2013	Morgan White	
Requiem for a Dream (2000)	31 March 2015	Ellen Burstyn, Keith David, Christopher McDonald, Mark Margolis	Emily Intravia
Reservoir Dogs (1992)	12 February 2013	Paul Zimmerman, Monte Hellman	Jamie Jenkins
Return of the Jedi (1983)	28 July 2025	Jim Bloom	Jamie Benning, Stephen Scarlata
The Revenge of VHS	21 July 2013	Mike Malloy, Steven Spinelli	
Richard III (1995)	16 September 2014	Dr, Philip Stone, Richard Loncraine	Ed Pettit
Ricky 6 (2000)	20 November 2012	Peter Filardi	Josh Gravel
Ride the Pink Horse (1947)	11 November 2020	Sarah Weinman	Carol Borden, Jedidiah Ayres
Robocop (1987)	21 June 2011	Nancy Allen, Ronny Cox, Miguel Ferrer, Monte Hellman, Michael Miner, Ed Naha, Ed Neumeier, Jerry Paffendorf	
Robot Monster (1953)	17 July 2024	Bob Furmanek, Anders Runestad	Katharine Coldiron, Tim Luz
Rock 'n' Roll High School (1979)	9 June 2015	Allan Arkush, Dean Cundey, Russ Dvonch, Clint Howard, Joseph McBride, PJ Soles, Richard Whitley, Mary Woronov, Dey Young	Adam Schartoff
Rock Steady Row (2018)	20 July 2018	Trevor Stevens, Bomani Story	
The Rocketeer (1991)	18 August 2015	Joe Johnston, Paul De Meo, Danny Bilson, Jon Polito	Chris Stachiw
The Rocking Horse Winner (1949)	24 January 2017		Maitland McDonagh
The Rocky Horror Picture Show (1975)	29 October 2014	Sal Piro, Larry Viezel, Shawn Stutler, Scott Michaels, Jeffrey Weinstock	
Rollerball (1975)	17 March 2015	Ashlie Atkinson	John Kenneth Muir
Romance for Bugle (1967)	24 September 2025		Spencer Parsons, Emily Barney
Roommates (1981)	4 December 2018	Jane Hamilton, Larry Revene, Rick Marx	Heather Drain, Ashley West
Rosemary's Baby (1968)	23 October 2019	Suzen Tekla Kruglinska	Suzen Tekla Kruglnska, Kat Ellinger
Rosencrantz & Guildenstern Are Dead (1990)	9 September 2014	Jim Hunter	Ed Pettit
Rucker (2022)	23 October 2024	Amy Hesketh	Chris Stachiw, Father Malone
Rules of the Game (1939)	22 March 2023		Robert Bellissimo, Otto Bruno
Run of the Arrow (1957)	13 December 2016	Samantha Fuller, Christa Fuller, Paul Talbot	Joseph Maddrey, Cullen Gallagher
Runaway (1984)	5 August 2020		Carol Borden, Josh Stewart
The Running Man (1987)	10 September 2017	Steven E. de Souza, Kurt Fuller, George Linder, Rob Cohen	Andrew Nette, Aaron Peterson
The Rutles – All You Need is Cash (1978)	22 January 2019	Greg Weis, Neil Innes	Skizz Cyzyk, Maurice Bursztynski
Sabata (1969)	28 July 2021	Heather Drain. Mark Begley	Heather Drain, Mark Begley
Saint Jack (1979)	9 October 2012	Peter Bogdanovich	Ben Slater
Salo: The 120 Days of Sodom (1975)	16 May 2012	David Pendleton	Fräulein von B
Salvador (1986)	12 January 2016	Michael Murphy	Matt Zoller Seitz, Jamey Duvall
Santo vs. the Diabolical Hatchet (1965)	15 April 2014	Bobb Cotter	El Goro
The Saragossa Manuscript (1965)	18 December 2018		Samm Deighan, Rob St. Mary
The Sarnos - A Life in Dirty Movies (2013)	9 April 2014	Wiktor Ericsson	
Saturday Night Fever (1977)	13 January 2015	John Badham, Lloyd Kaufman	Mark Christopher
Scarecrow (1973)	3 July 2018	Jerry Schatzberg, Garry Michael White	Bill Ackerman, Jamey Duvall
Scarecrow in a Garden of Cucumbers (1972)	11 June 2025	Jeff Copeland, Sandra Scoppettone	Rahne Alexander, Elizabeth Purchell
A Scent of Heather (1980)	30 April 2013	Jane Hamilton	
Science Crazed (1991)	22 March 2016		Josh Johnson, Angela Mac
Scooby-Doo! Mystery Incorporated (2010-2013)	16 October 2020	Mitch Watson	Carol Borden, Father Malone
Score (1974)	25 January 2012	Radley Metzger	Lisa Vandever
Season of the Witch (1972)	29 October 2025	Payton McCarty-Simas, Adam Lowenstein	Father Malone, Rahne Alexander
Seconds (1966)	10 September 2013	Stephen Armstrong	Sam U. Rai
Secret Honor (1984)	30 October 2012	Donald Freed, Mark Feeney, Frank Beaver	
The Secret of NIMH (1982)	10 August 2019	Gary Goldman	El Goro, Kat Ellinger
Secretary (2002)	15 March 2016	Judy Dodge Cummings, Claire Cavanah	Rachel Kramer Bussel
The Seed of Man (1969)	19 February 2020	Nicoletta Ercole	Heather Drain, Kat Ellinger
Series 7: The Contenders (1999)	8 February 2012	Daniel Minahan, Brooke Smith	
Session 9 (2001)	30 October 2018	Brad Anderson, Stephen Gevedon	Axel Kohagen, Jedidiah Ayres
Seven Beauties (1975)	24 March 2021		Kat Ellinger, Samm Deighan
The Seven-Per-Cent Solution (1976)	19 April 2023	Nicholas Meyer	Aaron Peterson, David MacGregor
Sgt. Pepper's Lonely Hearts Club Band (1978)	29 November 2023	Dianne Steinberg	Agatha Luz, Andrew Nette
Shadow of a Doubt (1943)	16 October 2012	Tania Modleski	
Shag (1989)	23 August 2011	Robert Rusler, Scott Coffey, Page Hannah, Grace Smith	
Shallow Grave (1994)	24 November 2015	Mark Browning, John Hodge	Jeff Meyers
The Shining (1980)	11 October 2016	Douglas Milsome, Garrett Brown, Rodney Ascher, Rob Ager	Keith Gordon, Vincenzo Natali
Shirley Thompson Versus the Aliens (1972)	4 February 2026	Brian Thomson	Heather Drain, Chris O'Neill
Shock Treatment (1981)	24 May 2011	Jessica Harper, Cliff DeYoung	
Sholay (1975)	16 February 2016		Todd Stadtman, Beth Watkins
Shoot the Piano Player (1960)	13 November 2012	Richard Edwards	
The Shop on Main Street (1965)	25 September 2019		Jonathan Owen
Showgirls (1995)	18 January 2016	Rena Riffel, Jessica Flowers, David Schmader, Adam Nayman	Heather Drain, Jay Bauman
The Silent Partner (1978)	3 November 2021	Elliott Gould	Jonathan Melville, Cullen Gallagher
Simon (1980)	11 December 2012	Marshall Brickman	
Singapore Sling (1990)	14 May 2013	Professor Vrasidas Karalis	Fraulein Von B
The Slanted Screen (2006)	15 May 2016	Jeff Adachi	Rita Su
Smile (1975)	19 April 2016	Bruce Dern, Nicholas Pryor, Barbara Feldon, Denise Nickerson, Annette O'Toole	Carol Borden, Kevin Heffernan
Smoker (1983)	18 March 2014	Ron Jeremy, Sharon Mitchell, David Christopher, Susie Bright	Heather Drain
So I Married an Axe Murderer (1993)	7 May 2025	Cary Woods, Rob Fried	Amy Nicholson, Mike Sullivan
Society (1989)	31 July 2018	Brian Yuzna	Terry Frost, Jay Bauman
Solarbabies (1986)	4 August 2015	D.A. Metrov	Patrick Bromley
Solaris (1972)	31 July 2019		Keith Gordon, Rob St. Mary
Solo: A Star Wars Story (2018)	28 July 2019	Rob Bredow	Chris Bricklemyer, Josh Stewart
Solomon King (1974)	28 August 2022	Belinda Burton-Watts, Dennis Bartok, Craig Rogers	David Walker, Leon Chase
Some Call It Loving (1973)	14 June 2016	James B. Harris	Heather Drain, Aaron Peterson
Some Like it Hot (1959)	8 April 2026	Noah Isenberg	Heidi Honeycutt, Keith Gordon
Sonatine (1993)	13 December 2023		Beth Accomando, Cullen Gallagher
Song of the South (1946)	19 February 2013	Bruce Bickley, Jim Korkis, Jason Sperb	
Sonny Boy (1989)	20 September 2016	Robert Martin Carroll, Graeme Whifler, Michael Boston	Maitland McDonagh, Mike Malloy
Sorcerer (1977)	27 August 2013	William Friedkin	Eric Cohen
Sorority Babes in the Slimeball Bowl-O-Rama (1988)	11 July 2016	David DeCoteau	
Southland Tales (2006)	17 February 2021	Richard Kelly	Rob St. Mary, David Kittredge
The Sparks Brothers (2021)	26 June 2021	Paul Trewartha	
Spider-Man 2 (2004)	2 May 2024		Dan Merritt
Spirit of the Beehive (1973)	14 August 2024		Heather Drain, Robert Bellissimo
Spirits of the Air, Gremlins of the Clouds (1989)	18 February 2026		Cullen Gallagher, Rob Spencer
Splice (2009)	21 April 2015	Vincenzo Natali	Jamie Jenkins
The Spook Who Sat by the Door (1973)	26 October 2011	Christine Acham, Clifford Ward	
Spring, Summer, Fall, Winter... and Spring (2003)	16 August 2023		Beth Accomando, John Atom
Stage Fright (1950)	10 May 2016	Patrick McGilligan	Tania Modleski, Filip Önell
Stalker (1979)	31 January 2017	Geoff Dyer	Elric Kane, Joe Yanick
Star Trek II (1982)	4 September 2012	Nicholas Meyer	
Star Trek: The Motion Picture (1979)	13 July 2022	Alan Dean Foster, Jon Povill, Walter Koenig	A.J. Black, Trevor Gumbel
Star Wars (1977)	19 May 2015	Roger Christian, Michael Kaminsky, Chris Taylor, Alexandre O. Philippe, Harmy	Chris Bricklemyer
Starship Troopers (1997)	29 January 2013	Ed Neumeier, Paul M. Sammon	
Static (1985)	11 January 2012	Keith Gordon	
Story of O (1975)	10 December 2025	Pola Rapaport, Maya Gallus	Samm Deighan, Jessica Shires
Straight Time (1978)	14 December 2011	Andrew Rausch	
Strange Brew (1983)	2 September 2014	Dave Thomas, Steve De Jarnatt, Lynne Griffin, Jeff Robbins	Craig Bierko, Skizz Cyzyk
Stranger on the Third Floor (1940)	22 November 2016	Stephen D. Youngkin	Maitland McDonagh, Samm Deighan
The Strangler (1964)	20 August 2025		Otto Bruno, Tim Madigan
Straw Dogs (1971)	6 September 2016	Gordon Williams, David Weddle	Maitland McDonagh, Eric J. Peterson
Streets of Fire (1984)	9 August 2011	Michael Paré	
Stripteaser (1995)	20 April 2011	Dan Golden, Joe Bob Briggs	
The Stunt Man (1980)	7 March 2011	Richard Rush, Steve Railsback	
Sugar Hill (1974)	19 July 2016	Paul Maslansky, Don Pedro Colley, Joy Bostic	Heather Drain, Chris Stachiw
Sunset Blvd (1950)	30 November 2022	Steven Cohan, Jeffrey Schwarz	Agatha Luz, Philip Marinello
Super Fly (1972)	27 February 2019		Rob St. Mary, Chris Stachiw
Super Mario Bros. (1993)	3 March 2023	Jeff Ryan, Jim Jennewein, Tom S. Parker, Fred Caruso, David L. Snyder, Chris F. Woods, Dick Clement, Ian La Frenais, Parker Bennett, Mojo Nixon, Richard Edson, Ed Solomon	Chris Stachiw
Superbman: The Other Movie (1981)	18 April 2012	Vern Dietsche, Dave Teubner	
Superman (2025)	16 July 2025	Jeff East, Sarah Douglas, James Lawrence, Mike Thompson	Father Malone, Chris Stachiw
Superman: The Movie (1978)	28 April 2021	Jeff East, Sarah Douglas	James Lawrence, Mike Thompson
Surf Nazis Must Die (1987)	20 August 2013	Peter George	Mike Murphy
Surfer© Teen Confronts Fear (2018)	24 December 2018	Douglas Burke, Carol Connors	Timon Singh
Suspiria (1977)	9 October 2018	Alexandra Heller-Nicholas, Clare Nina Norelli	Maitland McDonagh, Rob St Mary
Suzi Q (2019)	10 August 2020	Suzi Quatro, Liam Firmager, Tait Brady	Maurice Bursztynski, Leon Chase
Sweet, Sweet Rachel (1971)	1 October 2025	Stefanie Powers	Amanda Reyes, Kendall R. Phillips
Swept Away (1974)	19 January 2022		Samm Deighan, Trevor Gumbel
The Swimmer (1968)	29 August 2017	Justin Bozung, Kate Buford, Preston Neal Jones	Rob St. Mary, Elric Kane
Tainted	31 March 2014		
The Taking of Pelham One Two Three (1974)	23 March 2011	Chris Gore	
Taking of Pelham One Two Three, The (1974) (Redux)	31 January 2024	Sal Viscuso	Keith Gordon, Duane Swierczynski
Taking Tiger Mountain Revisited (2019)	26 May 2019	Tom Huckabee	Heather Drain, Chris Stachiw
Tango & Cash (1989)	8 May 2024	Randy Feldman, Peter MacDonald	Lizzie Bassett, Chris Winterbauer
Tank Girl (1995)	20 March 2024	Rachel Talalay	Dahlia Schweitzer, Rahne Alexander
Tapeheads (1988)	2 August 2011	Bill Fishman, Peter McCarthy	Skizz Cyzyk
Taxidermia (2006)	17 January 2024		Jonathan Owen, Lumi Etienne
Ten Canoes (2006)	29 September 2015	Rolf de Heer, Ian Jones	Miguel Rodriguez
The Tenant (1976)	10 October 2017		Alex Winter, Jamey Duvall
Terror Firmer (1999)	23 October 2012	Lloyd Kaufman, Will Keenan	
TerrorVision (1986)	19 October 2017	Ted Nicolaou, Diane Franklin, Gerrit Graham	Josh Hadley, Moe Porne
Theodore Rex (1995)	26 February 2025	Jonathan Betuel	Brad Jones, Kevin Lehane
There Is No 13 (1974)	14 May 2025		Ben Buckingham, Heather Drain
There She Is (2014)	26 July 2013	Emily Sheskin	
There Will Be Blood (2007)	24 September 2013	Kevin Mattson, C.J. Wallis	
They Live (1988)	11 April 2017	D. Harlan Wilson, Sandy King, Peter Jason, Keith David	El Goro, Patrick Bromley
They Shoot Horses, Don't They? (1969)	18 March 2020		Emily Intravia, Scott Frank
The Thing (1982)	23 December 2016	John Kenneth Muir, Jez Conolly, Dean Cundey, Joel Polis, Thomas G. Waites	El Goro, Patrick Bromley
The Third Part of the Night (1970) / The Devil	8 April 2020		Samm Deighan, Kat Ellinger
The Thirteenth Floor (1999)	18 September 2012	Craig Bierko	
Three O'Clock High (1987)	5 June 2024	Richard Christian Matheson, Phil Joanou	Agatha Luz, Tim Luz
Three Poplars in Plyushchikha (1968)	18 May 2022		Gianna D'Emilio, Alistair Pitts
THX-1138 (1971)	16 August 2017	Brian Jay Jones, Matthew Robbins, Maggie McOmie, Bruce Chesse, Sid Haig	Jay Bauman, Chris Bricklemyer
Tickled (2016)	1 July 2016	David Ferrier, Dylan Reeve	
Time Bandits (1981)	30 June 2021	Michael Palin, Mike Edmonds	Eric J. Peterson, Maurice Bursztynski
A Time of Roses (1969)	3 January 2024	Jyrki Siukonen	Samm Deighan, Eric J. Peterson
Time Warped - The Greatest Cult Films of All Time (2020)	18 May 2020	Paul Fishbein, Danny Wolf, Edwin Neal	Chris Stachiw, Rod Lott
Timerider - The Adventure of Lyle Swann (1982)	15 June 2026	William Dear	Aaron Carruthers
Titus (1999)	26 August 2014	Julie Taymor, Harry Lennix	Edward Pettit
To Be or Not to Be (1942)	15 January 2019	Joseph McBride	Lutz Bacher, Ken Stanley, Paula Guthat
To Live & Die in L.A. (1985)	25 November 2020	Willem Dafoe, M. Scott Smith	Jedidiah Ayres, Andrew Nette
Tom of Finland (2017)	11 November 2017	Dome Karukoski, Pekka Strang, Seumas F. Sargent, Jessica Grabowsky	Maitland McDonagh
Tommy (1975)	19 March 2020	Kit Power, Arthur Brown	Heather Drain, Skizz Cyzyk
Tomorrow I'll Wake Up and Scald Myself with Tea (1977)	9 September 2020	Jonathan Owen	Noel Thingvall, Jim Donahue
Top of the Heap (1972)	15 February 2023	Christopher St. John	Gary Phillips, Samm Deighan
Top Secret! (1984)	17 February 2023	Ian McNeice, Christopher Villiers, Martyn Burke, Jim Abrahams, David Zucker	Mark Begley, Chris Stachiw
Torchbearer (2016)	2 July 2017	Zach Dasher	David Pace-Bonello, Chris Bricklemyer
Total Recall (1990)	4 June 2019	Gary L. Goldman	Jedidiah Ayres, Rob St. Mary
Toto le Heros (1991)	25 March 2014	Jaco Van Dormael	Marcelline Block
Touki Bouki (1973)	4 August 2021		Spencer Seams, Ben Buckingham
Tourist Trap (1979)	17 February 2015	David Schmoeller, Charles Band, Nicholas Von Sternberg	Alex Jowski
The Toxic Avenger (1984)	26 June 2012	Lloyd Kaufman	
The Toxic Avenger (2023)	12 May 2026	Lloyd Kaufman, Andrew L. Miller	Rob St. Mary
Trancers (1984)	3 February 2015	Charles Band, Danny Bilson, Tim Thomerson	Jay Bauman
Traxx (1988)	27 July 2011	Shadoe Stevens	
Tremors (1990)	27 January 2015	Ron Underwood, S.S. Wilson	Jonathan Melville
The Trial (1962)	26 June 2024		David MacGregor, Mike Faloon
Tromeo & Juliet (1996)	21 August 2012	Lloyd Kaufman, Jane Jensen, Will Keenan	
Trouble in Paradise (1932)	11 January 2019	Joseph McBride	Lutz Bacher, Ken Stanley, Paula Guthat
Trouble Man (1972)	21 February 2019	Robert Hooks, John D. F. Black, Mary Black	Heather Drain, Maurice Bursztynski
True Romance (1993)	14 June 2023		Andrew J. Rausch, Kendall R. Phillips
True Stories (1986)	21 June 2023	Stephen Tobolowsky, Alix Elias	Chris Stachiw, Axel Kohagen
Turkey Shoot (1982)	28 October 2024	Roger Ward, Brian Trenchard Smith	Heather Drain, Andrew Nette
Twelve Monkeys (1995)	5 June 2018	Dahlia Schweitzer	Jedidiah Ayres, Tony Black
Twin Peaks: Fire Walk With Me (1992)	15 October 2013	Michael J. Anderson, Robert Engels	
Two Men in Manhattan (1959)	9 April 2025	Ginette Vincendeau	Samm Deighan, Andrew Leavold
Two-Lane Blacktop (1971)	7 May 2013	Monte Hellman	
UHF (1989)	2 June 2016	Jay Levey	Skizz Cyzyk, Cecil Trachenberg
The Umbrellas of Cherbourg (1964)	16 August 2016	Nino Castelnuovo, Anne E. Duggan	Ken Stanley, Rob St. Mary
Under the Flag of the Rising Sun (1972)	14 April 2021	Linda Hoaglund	Rob St. Mary, Chris Stachiw
Under the Silver Lake (2018)	16 November 2022		Jedidiah Ayres, Tim Luz
Under the Skin (2014)	11 August 2015	Alexander Stuart	Alexandra West
The Unknown Man of Shandigor (1967)	3 July 2024		Samm Deighan, Axel Kohagen
Upstream Color (2013)	23 July 2025		Ben Buckingham, Jim Laczkowski
V.I. Warshawski (1991)	19 November 2025	Sara Paretsky, David Aaron Cohen, Nick Thiel, Jeff Kanew, Warren Leight	Dahlia Schweitzer, Rahne Alexander
Valerie and Her Week of Wonders (1970)	21 June 2016	Peter Hames	Nicholas Schlegel, Kevin Heffernan, Axel Kohagen
Vanishing Point (1971)	3 July 2012	Malcolm Hart	Cullen Gallagher
The Ventures - Stars on Guitars (2020)	28 December 2020	Staci Layne Wilson	Maurice Bursztynski, Skizz Cyzyk
Venus in Furs (1969)	22 January 2020		Samm Deighan, Brad Jones
Vertigo (1958)	30 August 2016	Patrick McGilligan, Dan Auiler	Tania Modleski, Susan White
VHS Extravaganza	18 June 2013	Josh Johnson, Mike Malloy, Dan Kinem, Thomas Edward Seymour, Ken Powell	
Vice Squad (1982)	23 August 2023	Gary Sherman, Steve Mitchell	Brad Jones, Heather Drain
Vidas Secas (1963)	1 July 2020		Chris Stachiw, Trevor Gumbel
A Virgin Among the Living Dead (1973)	25 October 2023		Jessica Shires, Heather Drain
The Visitor (1979)	7 March 2012	Lance Henriksen, Paige Conner	Josh Hadley
Visitor Q (2001)	19 July 2017	Tom Mes	Kevin Heffernan, Patrick Bromley
Visitors from the Arkana Galaxy (1981)	10 July 2024		Ryan Verrill, Samm Deighan
Viva La Muerte (1971)	10 June 2020		Heather Drain, Jess Byard
Wacko (1983)	27 April 2011	Greydon Clark, Zack Carlson	
Wake in Fright (1971)	17 May 2016	Ted Kotcheff, Anthony Buckley, Jack Thompson	Maitland McDonagh, Maurice Bursztynski
Walking the Edge (1985)	20 December 2023		Rahne Alexander, Mark Begley
Wanda (1970)	30 May 2018		Jordan Blossey, Roxy MacDonald
Wanda Whips Wall Street (1981)	2 May 2017	Larry Revene	Kevin Heffernan, Heather Drain
The Warriors (1979)	29 June 2011	Michael Beck, Deborah Van Valkenburgh, David Patrick Kelly, Terry Michos, David Harris, Sam Shaber	
Water Power (1977)	22 July 2014	Shaun Costello, Sharon Mitchell, Jeanne Silver	Heather Drain
Watermelon Man (1970)	4 February 2014	Estelle Parsons, Joe Angio	Bill Fulkerson
Weekend (1967)	31 January 2025		Andrei Idu, Rob St. Mary
Welcome Home Brother Charles (1975)	22 February 2023	Sam Ingraffia	Gary Phillips, Jackie Stewart
Welcome to Woop Woop (1997)	25 February 2026		Rahne Alexander, Ben Buckingham
Welcome, or No Trespassing (1964)	11 May 2022		Gianna D'Emilio, Alistair Pitts
What Ever Happened to Baby Jane? (1962)	15 August 2025	Dominic Burgess	Otto Bruno, Tim Madigan
What Would You Say to a Nice Plate of Spinach? (1977)	15 September 2021		Jonathan Owen, Ben Buckingham
When We Went Mad (2024)	30 September 2024	Alan Bernstein	
The White Reindeer (1952)	24 January 2024		El Goro, Kat Ellinger
White Sands (1992)	3 February 2021	Daniel Pyne	Andrew Nette, Jedidiah Ayres
Who Can Kill a Child? (1976)	22 October 2013		Nicholas Schlegel
Who Framed Roger Rabbit (1988)	4 April 2019	Gary K. Wolf	Chris Stachiw, Axel Kohagen
Who is Arthur Chu? (2017)	14 May 2017	Scott Drucker, Yu Gu	Rod Lott
Who Killed Teddy Bear? (1965)	1 November 2017		Heather Drain, Terry Frost
Who Wants to Kill Jessie? (1966)	26 September 2018		Jonathan Owen, Jim Laczkowski
Who's Minding the Mint? (1967)	3 September 2025		Tim Madigan, Otto Bruno
Whoops Apocalypse (1986)	6 July 2022	David Renwick, Brian Eastman	Josh Hadley, Mike Sullivan
The Wild Boys (2017)	18 March 2026	Bertrand Mandico	Kyler Fey, Michelle Kisner
The Wild Bunch (1969)	17 August 2026	Walon Green, Alfonso Arau, Lilia Castillo, Kathryn Jones, Bill Mesce	Rob St. Mary, Josh Hadley
Wings of Desire (1987)	13 June 2017		Joe Yanick
Winter Kills (1979)	25 April 2018	William Richert	Jeff Meyers, Matthew Socey
Wise Blood (1979)	14 September 2022	Jean W. Cash, Michael Fitzgerald, Dan Shor, Amy Wright	Maitland McDonagh, Philip Marinello
Witchhammer (1970)	8 September 2021		Rahne Alexander, Samm Deighan
Witching & Bitching (2013)	13 October 2021		Elena Romea, Andrew Leavold
Withnail & I (1987)	23 December 2020	Ralph Brown, Kim Leggatt	Jon Cross, Vincenzo Natali
Wizards (1977)	12 July 2023		Vincenzo Natali, Agatha Luz
Wolfen (1981)	16 October 2019	Whitley Strieber, Rupert Hitzig, John D. Hancock, Craig Safan	Stephen Graham Jones, Jedidiah Ayres
The Woman Chaser (1999)	23 November 2011	Robinson Devor, Joe McSpadden, Patrick Warburton	Paul Freitag
The Woman in the Dunes (1964)	27 December 2023		Samm Deighan, Beth Accomando
The Woman on the Beach (1947)	20 November 2024		Robert Bellissimo, Otto Bruno
Working Girls (1986)	30 September 2014	Lizzie Borden, Amanda Goodwin	Grace Smith
World War Z (2013)	2 October 2019	Sarah Juliet Lauro	Patrick Bromley, Dahlia Schweitzer
World's Greatest Sinner (1962)	16 November 2011	Michael C. Gwynne, Romeo Carey, John Easdale	Marisa Young
WR: Mysteries of the Organism (1971)	6 August 2013	Lorraine Mortimer	
The Wraith (1986)	10 February 2015	Mike Marvin, Clint Howard, Jamie Bozian	Patrick Bromley
The Writer with No Hands (2017)	3 September 2018	William Westaway, Matthew Alford	Rod Lott
Yojimbo (1961)	17 July 2018		Jordan Blossey, Eric Cohen
Young, Hot 'N Nasty Teenage Cruisers (1977)	9 March 2022	Serena Czarnecki	Heather Drain, Anthony King
Z (1969)	8 January 2020		Keith Gordon, Eric Cohen
Z Channel: A Magnificent Obsession (2004)	7 January 2026		Adam Long, Josh Hadley
Z.P.G. (1972) & Children of Men (2006)	28 March 2018	Mei Fong	Keith Gordon, Christine Makepeace
Zack Snyder's Justice League (2021)	22 March 2021		Josh Hadley, Chris Stachiw
Zappa (2020)	23 November 2020	Alex Winter	Skizz Cyzyk, Yaniv Eidelstein
Zardoz (1974)	7 January 2014	Brian Hoyle	Josh Johnson
Zerograd (1988)	18 January 2023	Karen Shakhnazarov	Samm Deighan, Alistair Pitts
Zoom In: Sex Apartments (1980)	29 July 2014	Jerry Chandler	Coffin Jon
