= Love Forbidden =

- Directed by: Rodolphe Marconi
- Written by: Rodolphe Marconi
- Produced by: Rodolphe Marconi
- Starring: Rodolphe Marconi; Andrea Necci; Echo Danon; Orietta Gianjorio; Hervé Brunon
- Cinematography: Duccio Cimatti
- Edited by: Isabelle Denvick
- Music by: Bruno Alexiu
- Production companies: Marconi Films; Zincou Films; Centre national du cinéma et de l'image animée
- Distributed by: Pyramide Distribution
- Release date: 16 October 2002
- Running time: 96 minutes
- Country: France
- Languages: French; English; Italian

Love Forbidden (French: Défense d'aimer) is a 2002 French drama film directed by Rodolphe Marconi, starring Rodolphe Marconi, Andrea Necci, Echo Danon, Orietta Gianjorio and Hervé Brunon.

== Cast ==
- Rodolphe Marconi as Bruce
- Andrea Necci as Matteo
- Echo Danon as Aston
- Orietta Gianjorio as Orietta
- Hervé Brunon as Germain
- Maria Teresa De Belis as Maria Teresa
- Irene D'Agostino as Irene
- Tomaso D'Ulizia as Tomaso

== Reception ==
Dave Kehr of The New York Times wrote that while the film "falls back on a screenwriting convention for its unfortunately abrupt ending", it "suggests" that Marconi "possesses a talent and a sensibility likely to flower in the future." Frank Schenk of The Hollywood Reporter wrote that while the film's exploration of the shifting nature of sexuality is "sometimes provocative", it is "ultimately undone by its pretensions". Maitland McDonagh of TV Guide rated the film 2 stars out of 5 and wrote that the film is "sometimes fascinating, other times just infuriating."

Scott Foundas of Variety called the film a "step backward" for Marconi. The film received negative reviews in Film Journal International, The Village Voice and Video Store Magazine.
