= Cashiers du Cinemart =

American film zine and magazine (1994–2014)

'Cashiers du Cinemart'
- Editor and publisher: Mike White
- Categories: Film criticism, cult film, independent film
- Frequency: Irregular
- Founder: Mike White
- First issue: September 1994
- Final issue Number: 2014; 18
- Country: United States
- Based in: Riverview, Michigan
- Language: English
- Website: www.cashiersducinemart.com
- ISSN: 1528-0586

Cashiers du Cinemart (often abbreviated CdC) was an American zine and online magazine about cult film, independent film and exploitation film, founded in 1994 and published and edited by Mike White. It began as a photocopied, cut-and-paste fanzine published from Riverview, Michigan, grew over the late 1990s into a more conventional magazine, added an online edition in 1997, and ran for eighteen issues between 1994 and 2014. The title is a play on the French film magazine Cahiers du cinéma.

The publication began as a mocking response to big-budget Hollywood filmmaking but became better known for long, researched pieces on overlooked directors, writers and films, including David Goodis, James Ellroy, Keith Gordon, John Paizs and the 1970s film Black Shampoo. After a hiatus in the late 2000s it returned in 2011 as a print-on-demand and e-book publication. In 2010, BearManor Media issued a collection of its articles, Impossibly Funky: A Cashiers du Cinemart Collection.

== History ==
=== Origins (1994–1996) ===
White has said he thought of the title while working in the ticket booth of a movie theater, probably while reading Factsheet Five, the directory of zine reviews. Before the first issue he had made a short video comparing Reservoir Dogs with Ringo Lam's City on Fire, titled Who Do You Think You're Fooling?, and the first issue followed. He released it in September 1994, several months after graduating from college. The issue carried the first part of "Tale of the Tape", a piece on the similarities between the two films, alongside writing on music and local Detroit-area subjects.

In its first form the zine ran about twelve pages of black-and-white photocopies, laid out with a typewriter and scissors and paste. White made the copies after hours at his day job and used the office's postage machine to mail them; he produced the first three issues this way, until their size made the method impractical. The zine's mailing address was a post office box in Riverview.

Growing page counts raised mailing and printing costs, and White gradually stopped courting individual subscribers. By the end of the print run he had roughly thirty subscribers but sent a couple of thousand copies per issue to distributors, who were his main source of income.

=== Growth (1996–2004) ===
White has said that issue 5 (1996) was his first desktop-published issue. It was also the first to feature an interview, with actor Bruce Campbell, and the first with cover art by Nathan Kane of Bongo Comics, who went on to draw covers for eight issues. Through the late 1990s and early 2000s the zine grew in length and added contributors, interviews, festival coverage and recurring sections. Issue 13 (2002), for example, included an interview with Canadian filmmaker Guy Maddin, and issue 14 (2004) included "Modern Day Midnight Movies", a list of fifty cult films from the preceding decade compiled by Skizz Cyzyk and White.

In 1997 White began work on an online edition of the zine, his first web-development project, and later kept the back issues archived online at impossiblefunky.com.

=== Hiatus (2004–2010) ===
After issue 14 in 2004 the gaps between issues lengthened. Issue 15 appeared in 2007; White has said he took the zine "off life support" after that issue, and in 2011 described it as having ended in 2007. By 2010 it was published exclusively online, and White told a local paper that the zine was effectively dead.

=== Revival (2011–2014) ===
In August 2011 White released issue 16 as part of what he called "the revenge of print", a wave of zines returning to publication. The issue was sold as a print-on-demand paperback through Lulu, as a Kindle edition and as an iBooks edition, and included an editorial titled "The Revenge of Print". White also produced old-style photocopied and stapled copies of the issue for his distributor, and several of its writers were people he had met while touring in support of Impossibly Funky. Later issues were released through print-on-demand and e-book channels: issue 17 in 2012 and issue 18, a twentieth-anniversary issue, in 2014. Issues 6 through 18 were later released as Kindle editions.

== Content and style ==
The magazine championed exploitation films, genre cinema and underseen independent work and took a deliberately irreverent stance toward mainstream criticism and film theory. Its writers favored subjects such as blaxploitation and sexploitation films, Hong Kong and Filipino action cinema, Japanese cinema, hardboiled crime fiction, unmade or unproduced screenplays, Star Wars fan films, mock-dubbed movies and cult television. White edited the magazine and wrote much of its content. One reviewer noted that its satire was balanced by genuine appreciation for well-made mainstream films rather than reflexive dismissal of them.

Issues were divided into recurring sections: Focus for features and interviews, View for film reviews, Hear for music, Read for books and zine reviews, and Festival for coverage of film festivals, along with comics, an editorial and a letters column. Interview subjects included Bruce Campbell, Keith Gordon, Alex Winter, Rich Koz (Svengoolie), Guy Maddin, Adam Resnick, Heywood Gould, Sid Haig and Filipino director Eddie Romero, and, in the 2010 collection, Dr. Demento.

=== Contributors ===
Besides White, contributors across the run included Skizz Cyzyk, Leon Chase, Karen Lillis, Mike Malloy, David MacGregor, Rich Osmond, Mike Thompson, Terry Gilmer, Andrew Grant, Chris Cummins, Clifton Howard, Andrew Rausch, Heather Drain, Andrew Leavold and Brian Frye.

== Issues ==
The magazine's eighteen issues appeared irregularly between 1994 and 2014.

No.	Year	Notes
1	1994	First issue; released September 1994.
2–3	1995	
4–6	1996	Issue 5 includes the zine's first interview (Bruce Campbell).
7	1997	
8	1998	Includes pieces on Black Shampoo.
9	1999	Star Wars fan films, Turkish remakes and lost cuts.
10	2000	Interviews with Keith Gordon and Alex Winter; pieces on unmade Planet of the Apes films.
11–12	2001	Issue 11 includes an interview with Rich Koz and film festival coverage.
13	2002	Interview with Guy Maddin.
14	2004	"Modern Day Midnight Movies".
15	2007	Pieces on David Goodis adaptations; last issue before the hiatus.
16	2011	"Revenge of Print" issue; print-on-demand and e-book editions.
17	2012	Features on Filipino exploitation film, Chuck Vincent and Andy Sidaris.
18	2014	Twentieth-anniversary issue.

== Impossibly Funky and other books ==
The idea for a collection came from Clint Johns, a zine specialist at Tower Records. After the chain filed for bankruptcy, White decided to self-publish, and he later reached an agreement with BearManor Media. In 2010 BearManor published Impossibly Funky: A Cashiers du Cinemart Collection, a 392-page selection of pieces from the first fifteen issues, with sections on Quentin Tarantino, Star Wars, Black Shampoo, unproduced screenplays and celebrity interviews. It has an introduction by Herschell Gordon Lewis and a foreword by Chris Gore, and many of the pieces were revised or expanded for the book.

White promoted the book with a screening of Black Shampoo at the Burton Theatre in Detroit and appearances at the Vault of Midnight comics shop, The Raconteur bookshop in Metuchen, New Jersey, and Quimby's Bookstore in Chicago. The book was reviewed in Fangoria and on the website Schlockmania, among others, and one reviewer, while calling the original zine uneven, found many of its articles essential.

White has since published other books, including Cinema Detours (2013), a collection of 220 reviews, and Mad Movies with the L.A. Connection (BearManor Media, 2019), a history of the L.A. Connection and its mock-dubbed late-night television show.

== Legacy ==
White has hosted the film podcast The Projection Booth since 2011. The magazine's back catalog is available on the Cashiers du Cinemart website, which as of October 2026 listed 477 of 504 pieces as readable online.

== See also ==
- The Projection Booth
- Cahiers du cinéma
- Factsheet Five
- Film Threat
