= Justin Bozung =

American author and editor

Justin Bozung is an American biographer, author, and editor as well as part-time archivist and award-winning filmmaker.

== Career ==
Bozung has written for Fangoria, Shock Cinema, Paracinema, and Phantom of the Movies' Videoscope. He was the co-creator of The Projection Booth Podcast with Mike White and served as the editor of the Mondo Film & Video Guide from 2010 until 2012.

He sits on the board of the Norman Mailer Society, serves as part-time archivist for Project Mailer, and is the host of the Norman Mailer Society Podcast.

He has contributed to two books on Stanley Kubrick including Stanley Kubrick's The Shining: Studies in the Horror Film, and is the editor of The Cinema of Norman Mailer: Film is Like Death.

He has been researching Frank Perry's life since 2013 for a planned official biography titled Character Is Story: The Life & Films of Frank Perry.

== Bibliography ==
- (2015) Stanley Kubrick's The Shining: Studies in the Horror Film, Ed. Danel Olson, Centipede Press, Lakewood, Colorado, pages 335-665, ISBN 978-1613470695.
- (2015) Last Summer: Take Two in Movie Outlaw Vol. 1, Ed. Mike Watt, Createspace Independent Publishing, Seattle, pages 295-96, ISBN 978-1511452793.
- (2015) The American Antonioni, in The Mailer Review, Volume 9, 2015, Ed. Phillip Sipiora, University of South Florida Press, ISBN 978-1511452793.
- (2016) Norman Mailer's Dark Forces, in The Mailer Review, Volume 10, 2016, Ed. Phillip Sipiora, University of South Florida Press, ISBN 978-1511452793.
- (2017) The Cinema of Norman Mailer: Film is Like Death, Bloomsbury, New York, ISBN 978-1501325502.
- (2018) Mailer De Facto: How Norman Mailer Saved Barney Rosset, in The Mailer Review, Volume 12, 2018, Ed. Phillip Sipiora, University of South Florida Press, ISBN 978-1511452793.
- (2021) Norman Mailer in Context, Ed. Maggie McKinley, Cambridge University Press, pages 91–101, ISBN 9781108774413

== Filmography ==
- (2024) Invocation of the Memory of Mary Turner, lynched on May 19, 1918
- (2025) Afterword
- (2025) Paul Morrissey...Will You Marry Me?
- (2026) Your Title Here
