= Jill Nelson =

American novelist

Jill Nelson (born June 14, 1952) is an American journalist and novelist. She has written several books, including the autobiographical Volunteer Slavery: My Authentic Negro Experience, which won an American Book Award. She was Professor of Journalism at the City College of New York from 1998 to 2003.

== Biography ==
Born in Harlem, Jill Nelson grew up in New York's West Side, spending summers on Martha's Vineyard. She attended a boarding school, Solebury School. Her brother is filmmaker Stanley Nelson. She graduated from the City College of New York and went on to study at the Columbia School of Journalism. Nelson wrote for the Washington Post Magazine at its inception, and was awarded the Washington D.C. Journalist of the Year for her contributions. Her work has also appeared in The New York Times, Essence, The Nation, Ms., the Chicago Tribune, the Village Voice, USA Today, USA Weekend, and msnbc.com.

Nelson wrote the autobiographical Volunteer Slavery: My Authentic Negro Experience (1993) about her experiences as a black female journalist at the Washington Post. Her 1997 book Straight, No Chaser: How I Became A Grown-Up Black Woman, also autobiographical, discussed role models for black women.

Her first work of fiction, Sexual Healing, was published in 2003.

== List of works ==
- Volunteer Slavery: My Authentic Negro Experience 1993. Hardback ISBN 1-879360-24-1; Softback ISBN 0-14-023716-X
- Straight, No Chaser: How I Became A Grown-Up Black Woman. 1997. ISBN 0-14-027724-2
- Editor, Police Brutality: An Anthology. 2000. ISBN 0-393-32163-0
- Sexual Healing. 2003. Hardback ISBN 978-0-9724562-0-3; paperback ISBN 978-0-9724562-5-8
- Finding Martha's Vineyard: African Americans at Home on an Island. 2005. ISBN 0-385-50566-3
- Let's Get It On. 2009. ISBN 0-060-76330-2
