= Zachary Oberzan =

American filmmaker and theatre director

- Born: Zachary Aaron Oberzan; Saco, Maine, U.S.
- Occupations: Film & theater maker, actor, singer/songwriter
- Years active: 1997–present
- Website: www.oberzan.com

Zachary Aaron Oberzan is an American filmmaker, theater director, actor, and Singer-songwriter.

== Early life and education ==
Oberzan was born and raised in the town of Saco, Maine.

He graduated from Dartmouth College in 1997 and moved to New York City to pursue a career in the arts. Major depression has influenced his work.

== Career ==
Oberzan is a filmmaker, theater director, actor, and singer/songwriter.

=== Theater ===
As a founding member of the New York City-based theater collective Nature Theater of Oklahoma, he collaborated in the creation and performance of No Dice, Poetics: A ballet brut, and the one-man show Rambo Solo, in which Oberzan conveyed the plot and the pathos of David Morrell's 1972 thriller First Blood.

In 2010, Oberzan's solo theater/film piece Your brother. Remember? premiered at Kunstenfestivaldesarts in Brussels. An examination of family deterioration and redemption, the piece uses twenty-year-old home movie footage, recreated shot-for-shot in the present day, and employs the life of Belgian action star Jean-Claude Van Damme as a means to tell its bittersweet story. As of December 2016, Oberzan has performed the piece in over fifty cities worldwide. Ben Walters, Guardian UK, writes: “Oberzan's 'Your brother. Remember?' is a brilliant piece of 21st-century art, an elegant mash-up of pop culture and the intensely personal, of live performance and the moving image, of memento mori and joie de vivre, the death wish and the creative impulse. It's funny, clever and profound.” In April 2012 Your brother. Remember? was released as a stand-alone film to critical praise.

On Mr. Van Damme's 53rd birthday in October 2013, Oberzan's theater/film/musical, Tell Me Love Is Real, premiered at the International Arts Campus deSingel in Belgium, followed by a world tour. Having overdosed on the anxiety drug Xanax at approximately the same time and under similar circumstances as Whitney Houston, Oberzan leans on the personages of Amelia Earhart, Serge Gainsbourg, Bruce Lee, Buddy Holly, Leonard Cohen, and a host of others to examine existential quandaries through pop culture. Tages Anzeiger writes: “'Tell Me Love Is Real' is a highly aestheticized autobiography and deeply moving collage of film clips, live performance, and songs. Oberzan, the delicate extreme experimentalist, tells and sings and DJs his own story, understated yet unrestrained and heartbreaking.“

Oberzan's most recent work, The Great Pretender, a theater/film/concert inspired by Iranian director Abbas Kiarostami's film Close-Up and the persona of Elvis Presley, premiered in Belgium in December 2015 followed by a European tour. Writes Norway's Adressavisen, "Very funny, very sad, very strange, and very serious...A very impressive performance when [Oberzan] shows his stage personality Elvis/Oberzan in various stages of barbiturate intoxication, from the euphoric to the absolutely helpless, all disturbingly credible."

=== Film ===
In 2007 Oberzan, burnt out from complete failure in the film industry, created his first feature film, a "one-man cinematic war," Flooding with Love for The Kid. Meticulously adapting his favorite novel First Blood, Oberzan, as a metaphor representative of Rambo's own alienated and deeply frustrated struggle, shot, designed, edited, and portrayed all 26 characters by himself (including hunting dogs) in his minuscule 220-square-foot (20 m^{2}) Manhattan studio apartment, with a total budget of $95.51. Never intended for public viewing, the film eventually was discovered by both film critics and fans of First Blood, prompting a run at Anthology Film Archives in January 2010. Worldwide screenings and critical acclaim followed. Film Quarterly wrote: "Sheer logistic complexity...a thrilling and mind boggling experience." Pulitzer-prize nominated critic Matt Zoller Seitz released a video essay contrasting the film with the better-known Sylvester Stallone version. The New School Professor and Fulbright winner Carol Wilder devoted a chapter of her 2013 book Crossing the Street in Hanoi to Flooding with Love for The Kid. From her interview with Oberzan:

"[Audiences respond] to my deep personal love for the story and its characters...[they have] a sudden new appreciation for the depth of the story of Rambo. That made me feel proud that I was offering this illumination. Spreading the Gospel, as I like to think of it. It's like, imagine if everyone thought Hamlet was a dumb story with dumb characters because they had never taken the time to read it? And I was able to show them the true depth and humanity of Hamlet. So my attachment and love of the book grew even more, being this conduit. People understand these projects because of their form and passion. They personally couldn't care less about Rambo, but they appreciate it as a vehicle for excellent storytelling. And I can live with that, because I've done my job, and I have forever embedded myself in the world of First Blood, a world of tremendous struggle and bloodshed, but also a world of boundless love."

Oberzan began work on a follow-up film in 2008, again not intended for public viewing. Your brother. Remember? began as a film project, but soon morphed into a multi media piece involving live performance, film, and music. The live aspects were filmed during a performance in Vienna and coupled with the film footage to create a stand-alone film, premiering in New York City in 2012. Slant Magazine writes: "...A surprisingly sophisticated meditation on the specificity of cinematic representation and the impossibility of successfully reclaiming the past, as well as a secondhand character study as exhaustive and authentic as any in recent memory. That it does all of this amid Van Damme impersonations and toilet humor is what elevates it from a work that's merely accomplished to something like a work of genius.”

A full film version of Tell Me Love Is Real, with live aspects filmed in Vienna and Berlin, premiered in Copenhagen in May 2016. A full film version of The Great Pretender, with live aspects filmed in Vienna, Berlin, and Malmö, premiered in Los Angeles at the Poetic Research Bureau in May 2019. Writes Nick Toti of Hammer To Nail, "the greatest movie that never should have been made by the greatest filmmaker you've never heard of."

=== Music ===
A self-taught guitarist and singer, Oberzan has released two albums, Songs of Straw & Gold (1999) and Athletes of Romance (2006). Songs from these albums have been used in his films and plays and commercials for The Wes Anderson Collection.

== Recognition ==
Nature Theater of Oklahoma's No Dice won an Obie Award in 2008.

Marilyn Stasio of Variety wrote: "Watching Oberzan (on screen and in person) express his thoughts and damned-up feelings is funny as hell. And sadder than mere words can express."
