= Tania Modleski =

American feminist scholar

Tania Modleski (born 1949) is an American feminist scholar and cultural critic, Professor of English at the University of Southern California.

Modleski's Loving with a Vengeance, "to begin a feminist analysis of women's reading", considered three popular fictional genres: the Harlequin romance, the Gothic novel and the daytime US soap opera. Modleski argued that the formulaic nature of these genres gave readers the freedom to construct their own response, at a distance from the text. Her next book, The Women Who Knew Too Much, examined seven Hitchcock films: Blackmail, Murder, Rebecca, Notorious, Rear Window, Vertigo and Frenzy. Modelski now challenged the terms of taking 'distance' from a text, arguing that "the desire for distance itself [is] ... bound up with the male's insistence on his difference from woman." By contrast to male violence, the 'feminine' could embrace "narrative empathy, spectatorial passivity, and the subconscious imaginary".

In Feminism Without Women, Modleski argued that "male power frequently works to efface female subjectivity by occupying the site of femininity", and that the writer has a responsibility to re-articulate women's shared experience.

== Works ==
- Loving with a Vengeance: Mass-Produced Fantasies for Women. London: Methuen, 1982
- The Women Who Knew Too Much: Hitchcock and feminist theory. New York: Methuen, 1983
- (ed.) Studies in entertainment: critical approaches to mass culture. Bloomington: Indiana University Press, 1986.
- Feminism Without Women: Culture and Criticism in a "Postfeminist" Age. New York: Routledge, 1991.
- Old wives' tales, and other women's stories. New York: New York University Press, 1998.
