= Todd Stadtman =

American singer-songwriter (1961–2021)

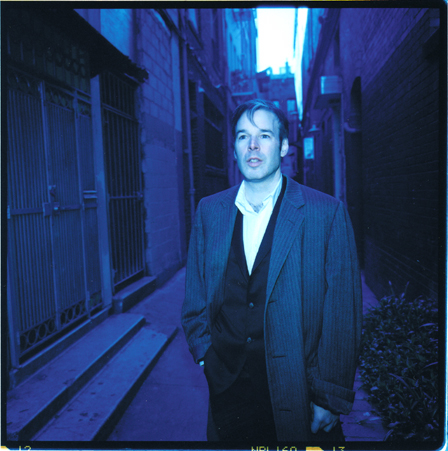
Todd Stadtman, Chinatown, San Francisco. 2004.

Todd Alan Stadtman (August 21, 1961 – January 9, 2021) was an American singer, songwriter, musician, producer, author, blogger, and podcaster.

Stadtman's musical works combine an affinity for classic pop songcraft, with a wide range of post-punk, electronic and alternative music influences. His literary work encompassed a wide array of genres, including lucha libre, foreign horror, and Bollywood, with Stadtman publishing a celebrated guidebook to that genre. His foray into fiction included a trilogy of novels, the "SF Punk Trio", which paid homage to his punk rock days in 1980s San Francisco. In addition to his own "Friday’s Best Pop Song Ever" podcast, Stadtman also co-hosted several movie podcasts.

== Early life ==
The youngest of four children, Stadtman was born on August 21, 1961, at Alta Bates Hospital in Berkeley, California, to Jackolyn Stadtman, a homemaker, and Verne Stadtman, a writer and editor, known for The 100 Year History: The University of California 1868-1968.

From a young age, he pursued many different creative outlets, including making super-8 films; drawing, including many cartoons and graphic stories; and songwriting. As a teenager, he was a voracious consumer of culture and media, with special interests in Japanese animation, horror films, and music.

He attended Berkeley High School. He was often seen during those years at the Kittredge Street Cafe, drinking coffee, writing, and hanging out with friends; at local record stores or writing and rehearsing music at friends' homes in Berkeley during the 1970s.

== Career ==
=== Music ===
Stadtman made his debut in the San Francisco music scene as singer and bassist for punk/power-pop group The Blitz in 1978, and later for the popular local art-punk band B Team, along with friends David Rubenstein and Greg Baker. B Team released two EPs, First Product and Buy American, between 1981 and 1983. In 1985, he then fronted The Naked Into, a dark pop outfit also featuring Lisa Davis, later of American Music Club and the Toiling Midgets; Dave Hawkins, later of Engine 88; and David Rubenstein. The band released one LP, 1987's Here Comes the World, on local label Infrasonic Records, before breaking up the following year.

As a member of the duo Zikzak – which also featured guitarist/arranger David Rubinstein – Stadtman co-wrote, co-produced, and performed on See You There, released on Bitter Records in 2000. Following that group's dissolution in 2001, he embarked upon a solo career, releasing two solo albums in the ensuing years. The first of these, Anxotica, released in 2003, featured contributions from San Francisco soundtrack artists Pray for Rain, singer-songwriter Hannah Marcus, and American Music Club guitarist Vudi. For Only I Can Save You, released on Prix Fixe Records in 2005 – a disc with a far more minimal, electro-influenced sound than its predecessor – Stadtman co-produced with Pray for Rain's Dan Wool. He continued to write new music – in 2017, a musical, Mad Girl, and a new album, Black Seed, in 2018. In January 2020, Stadtman participated in a reunion of The Naked Into at The Ivy Room in Albany, California. Due to the continuation of dysfunctional band dynamics that persisted from the '80s, Stadtman and Rubinstein performed the reunion as a duo.

=== Writing ===
Stadtman began writing for Teleport City, one of the longest-running cult cinema websites on the internet, in February 2008. Around the same time, he started his Rondo Award-nominated blog Die, Danger, Die, Die, Kill! He also contributed to the Movie-fan Princess and Cinemaazi blogs.

In March 2015, he released his first book, Funky Bollywood: The Wild World of 1970s Indian Action Cinema, which was published by Britain's FAB Press to international acclaim. His writing has also appeared in the Times of India, Famous Monsters of Filmland magazine, and on the websites io9, Mondo Macabro, and The Cultural Gutter. He also contributed to the Turkey edition of the World Directory of Cinema, published by Intellect, Ltd. In 2017, he published his first novel in the "SF Punk Trio", Please Don't Be Waiting for Me, which was followed in 2018 by its sequel, So Good Its Bad. He completed the trilogy with Never Divided in 2019. Stadtman's last film book, "The Sophisticate's Guide to Global Cinema" will be released by FAB Press in 2026.

=== Podcasts and radio shows ===
In April 2018, Stadtman hosted "Friday's Best Pop Song Ever", a podcast that became an extension of his blog, Die, Danger, Die, Die, Kill!, in which he showcased unique pop songs. Additionally, his contributions to the following podcasts reflect his passion to cult cinema: Infernal Brains, with Tars Tarkas; Taiwan Noir, with Ken Brorsson; and Monster Island Resort, with Miguel Rodriguez. Stadtman also co-hosted the radio show "Pop Offensive" from 2014 to 2020, celebrating global pop songs with 67 episodes on Peralta College's Oakland-based KGPC-FM station.

== Personal life ==
In 2002, Stadtman met Liza Sotelo; the pair were married in San Francisco in 2007, and moved to Oakland, California in 2016. They relocated to Brooklyn, New York in 2020.

=== Death ===
Stadtman fell ill in November 2020. He died from multiple medical complications related to pre-existing conditions in Brooklyn, New York, on January 9, 2021, with his wife by his side.
