= Maitland McDonagh =

American film critic

Maitland McDonagh (/ˈmeɪtlənd mɪkˈdɒnə/) is an American film critic, writer-editor and podcaster. She is the author of Broken Mirrors/Broken Minds: The Dark Dreams of Dario Argento (1991) and other books and articles on horror and exploitation films, as well as about erotic fiction and erotic cinema. In 2022, McDonagh was inducted into the Rondo Hatton Classic Horror Awards' Monster Kid Hall of Fame. She is the founder of the small press 120 Days Books, which became an imprint of Riverdale Avenue Books.

== Early life ==
McDonagh was born in New York City, the daughter of Don McDonagh, a dance critic and author, and Jennifer Jane Tobutt, She is of Irish and English descent. Her paternal grandparents, both Irish emigrants, operated the Moylan Tavern in Morningside Heights.

She received her Bachelor of Arts from Hunter College and her Master of Fine Arts from Columbia University, where she co-founded and edited the magazine Columbia Film Review. She was simultaneously working in the publicity department of the New York City Ballet, eventually becoming head of publicity.

== Career ==
In 1991, McDonagh released her book Broken Mirrors, Broken Minds, a scholarly analysis, expanded from her master's thesis, of the films of Italian giallo writer-producer-director Dario Argento. An expanded 2010 reissue was named one of PopMatters' "Best Non-Fiction of 2010".

After leaving New York City Ballet, McDonagh taught film as an adjunct professor at Brooklyn College, during which time she completed Filmmaking on the Fringe: The Good, The Bad, and the Deviant Directors and The 50 Most Erotic Films of All Time. Her freelance work during this period included film pieces for The New York Times, Entertainment Weekly, Film Comment, Time Out New York, Premiere Fangoria, and other magazines and newspapers. From 1995 to 2008, she was senior movies editor for the website of the magazine TV Guide.

Her book Movie Lust (2006) was third in the Sasquatch Books series begun with Book Lust by Nancy Pearl and Music Lust by Nic Harcourt. In 2006, she was a co-founder of the Alliance of Women Film Journalists. She is also a member of the New York Film Critics Online.

In 2014, McDonagh created the company 120 Days Books to republish rare 1970s and 1980s gay-erotica genre novels, beginning with a pair of two-in-one volumes: the crime thrillers Man Eater and Night of the Sadist and the supernatural fantasies Vampire's Kiss and Gay Vampire. Later in the decade, this became an imprint of Riverdale Avenue Books.

McDonagh provides interviews and second-channel commentary on DVD / Blu-ray releases, including for director Paul Schrader's Blue Collar, Dario Argento's Tenebrae, and Douglas Buck's Family Portraits: A Trilogy of America, and liner notes, including for the Criterion Collection releases The Tunnel, The Innocents, Kuroneko, and the paired Corridors of Blood/The Haunted Strangler, Arrow Video's Dressed to Kill, and Second Sight Films' The Texas Chain Saw Massacre 4K UHD. She stars in a documentary short, speaking on serial-killer cinema, on the Criterion Collection release of The Silence of the Lambs. Since 2016, she has been a recurring guest host of the podcast The Projection Booth. In 2024, she began reviewing horror and other genre films weekly at her online website, Maitland on Movies.

She has appeared in documentaries, including Night Bites: Women and Their Vampires (2003) for WE: Women's Entertainment, Pretty Bloody: The Women of Horror (2009) for Canada's Space network, Still Screaming: The Ultimate Scary Movie Retrospective (2011) for MasiMedia LCC and as a panelist at film events by the Museum of the Moving Image and others. She has served on the juries of film festivals including the 2022 Fantasia International Film Festival in Montreal, Canada.

== Bibliography ==
- Broken Mirrors/Broken Minds: The Dark Dreams of Dario Argento, (London, England, Sun Tavern Fields, 1991; reissued New York, Citadel Press, 1994) ISBN 0-9517012-4-X; expanded and reissued, Minneapolis, Minnesota, University of Minnesota Press, 2010 ISBN 978-0816656073
- Filmmaking on the Fringe: The Good, the Bad, and the Deviant Directors (New York, Carol Publishing, 1995) ISBN 0-8065-1557-0
- The 50 Most Erotic Films of All Time: From Pandora's Box to Basic Instinct (New York, Carol Publishing Corporation, 1996) ISBN 0-8065-1697-6
- Movie Lust: Recommended Viewing for Every Mood, Moment, and Reason (Seattle, Wash., Sasquatch Books, 2006) ISBN 1-57061-478-4

=== As co-author ===
- Lassalle, Nancy, and Maitland McDonagh, Lincoln Kirstein, Peter Martins, Jerome Robbins, New York City Ballet: Fortieth Anniversary (New York, New York City Ballet, 1988)

=== As editor ===
- McDonagh, Maitland (editor). Holiday Gay: Tales of Love, Lust, Romance and Other Seasonal Gifts (2018) New York: Riverdale Avenue Books. ISBN 978-1-626-01494-7

=== Anthologies ===
Maitland McDonagh essays appear in:

- Bryce, Allan, ed. (2000). "The Living Dead at Miskatonic Morgue [and] Sometimes They Come Back...Again". Zombie. Liskead, Cornwall, England: Stray Cat Publishing. ISBN 978-0953326129.
- Bryce, Allan, ed. (2000). "Martine Beswicke: Sister Hyde [and] Barbara Steele: Witches and Bitches". Fantasy Females. Liskead, Cornwall, England: Stray Cat Publishing. ISBN 0953326144.
- White, Andrew, ed. (2000). "You Gotta Have Park: Come Down by the Riverside". Time Out Book of New York Walks. London: Time Out / Penguin. ISBN 978-0140296228.
- Sidaris, Andy (2003). "On Andy's Gang". Bullets Bombs and Babes. Heavy Metal Books. ISBN 978-1932413007.
- Horwath, Alexander, ed. (2004). "The Exploitation Generation. or: How Marginal Movies Came in from the Cold". The Last Great American Picture Show: New Hollywood Cinema in the 1970s. Amsterdam University Press. ISBN 978-9053564936.
- Edwards, Matthew, ed. (2007). "Writing Argento". Film Out of Bounds: Essays and Interviews on Non-Mainstream Cinema Worldwide. McFarland & Company. ISBN 978-0786429707.
- Nette, Andrew, ed. (2019). "Fifty Shades of Gay: An Introduction to the Gay Adult Pulp of the 1970s". Sticking It to the Man: Revolution and Counterculture in Pulp and Popular Fiction, 1950 to 1980. PM Press. ISBN 9781629636665.
- Nette, Andrew; Iain McIntyre, eds. (2021). "The Stars My Destination: The Future According to Gay Adult Science Fiction Novels of the 1970s". Dangerous Visions and New Worlds: Radical Science Fiction, 1950 to 1985. PM Press. pp. 111–119. ISBN 978-1629639321. Book a finalist nominee for a Hugo Award.
- Doyle, Michael, ed. (2022). "Re-Animator: Stuart Gordon". Stuart Gordon: Interviews (Conversations with Filmmakers Series). University Press of Mississippi. pp. 73–85. ISBN 978-1496837745.
