= Dahlia Schweitzer =

American pop culture critic (born 1976)

Dahlia Schweitzer (born 1976) is an American pop culture critic and writer. She is chair of the Film and Media program at the Fashion Institute of Technology in New York City. She is the author of various books and articles on film, television, music, gender, and identity.

== Biography ==
Born in Baton Rouge in 1976, Schweitzer studied English and studio art at Wesleyan University before moving to New York and Berlin to live and work. She moved to Los Angeles in 2006 to study criticism and theory at ArtCenter College of Design, where she taught in the Humanities and Science Department. In 2013, Schweitzer began in the PhD program in cinema and media studies at UCLA School of Theater, Film and Television. Her book Cindy Sherman's Office Killer: Another Kind of Monster is the only text to investigate Cindy Sherman's feature-length studio film, Office Killer. Going Viral, her second scholarly publication, focuses on the proliferation of outbreak narratives in media and popular culture. L.A. Private Eyes, published in 2019, examines the character of the private detective in Los Angeles as depicted in film, television, and literature. Haunted Homes, published in 2021, explores why haunted homes have become a prime stage for dramatizing anxieties about family, gender, race, and economic collapse.

== Selected bibliography ==
- Cindy Sherman's Office Killer: Another Kind of Monster (2014)
- Going Viral: Zombies, Viruses, and the End of the World (2018)
- L.A. Private Eyes (2019)
- Haunted Homes (2021)
