= Noah Isenberg =

American film scholar and historian

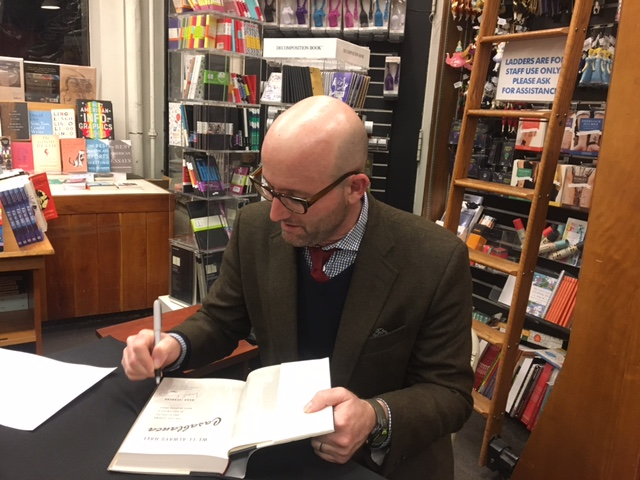
- Isenberg at a book signing in Cambridge, Massachusetts in 2017
- Born: Noah William Isenberg; June 28, 1967 (age 59)
- Occupation: Charles Sapp Centennial Professor University of Texas at Austin

Academic background
- Education: University of Pennsylvania (BA), University of Washington (MA), University of California, Berkeley (PhD)

Academic work
- Discipline: Film scholar
- Sub-discipline: Film historian
- School or tradition: Media Studies, Film Studies, Frankfurt School, Critical Theory, Cultural Studies
- Institutions: Moody College of Communication, University of Texas at Austin
- Main interests: German Cinema, Austrian Cinema, Classical Hollywood, Modernism, Film Noir, Fin-de-siècle Vienna, Frankfurt School,
- Website: www.noahisenberg.com

Noah William Isenberg (born June 28, 1967) is an American film scholar and historian. Isenberg is currently the Charles Sapp Centennial Professor and former Chair of the Department of Radio-Television-Film at The University of Texas at Austin. He previously served as Professor of Culture and Media at Eugene Lang College, where he was also the founding director of the Screen Studies program. In April 2026, he received the 2026 Guggenheim Fellowship in Film, Video, & New Media Studies.

== Education ==
Isenberg received his BA in History from the University of Pennsylvania, his MA in German Literature from the University of Washington, and his PhD in German Studies from the University of California at Berkeley.

== Career ==
=== Positions ===
Isenberg taught film studies and German at Wesleyan University from 1995 to 2004. In 2004, Isenberg began teaching as Professor of Culture and Media and the founding Director of Screen Studies at the New School in Greenwich Village. During the summer terms 2013 to 2017, Isenberg was a visiting professor of Film and Media studies at Dartmouth College, where he also held a visiting scholar position at the Leslie Center for the Humanities. In 2017, he was also a visiting professor of Film Studies at the University of Pennsylvania. In 2019, he became chair of the Radio-Television-Film department at the University of Texas at Austin, and served as Associate Dean for Professional Programs in Moody College 2023-24. He currently serves as the executive director of the university's two study-away centers in Los Angeles and New York.

=== Work ===
==== Edgar Ulmer ====
Isenberg has written extensively on Austrian-American film director Edgar Ulmer and his work. In 2004, he wrote his first article on Ulmer, highlighting the role of exile in Ulmer's work and aesthetics. On the basis of the article, Isenberg received a contract from the University of California for a biography of Edgar Ulmer. While researching Ulmer, Isenberg wrote a book-length study of Ulmer's film Detour, publishing it in 2008. He based that study on unpublished letters, interviews, and other archival materials, covering the film's production history, legacy, and subsequent interpretation. While writing the biography of Ulmer, Isenberg tried to strike a balance between expressing admiration for Ulmer's accomplishments while shying away from "the more hagiographic treatments" the director had received. Due to the uncertain nature of Ulmer's life, Isenberg claims the book is more of a work of "creative nonfiction" than a straightforward biography. The book was published in hardcover in 2014 as Edgar G. Ulmer: A Filmmaker at the Margins; a tenth-anniversary paperback edition is due out in 2024. The New York Times hailed the biography as "a page turner of a biography."

Isenberg describes Ulmer as an inspiration to the do-it-yourself generation of film. He emphasizes the breakneck pace at which Ulmer made his films, as well as the ways in which the director cut corners to speed up production. Isenberg's work also notes the ways in which Ulmer's filmmaking career pays homage to Weimar cinema. Isenberg states that Ulmer never received the recognition he deserved, as he is often dismissed as a director of B-movies, but that he brought an Old World sensibility to a unique and expansive body of work.

==== Casablanca ====
Isenberg began working on a book on the film Casablanca out of a desire to "understand something that defies comprehension," namely the widespread appeal of the film to himself and general audiences. Isenberg first pitched the book as Everybody Comes to Rick's: How Casablanca Taught Us to Love Movies. He claims that it was difficult as a film historian not to "get too enraptured" by certain moments in the film. He worked on the book at a quicker pace than usual out of pressure to release it by the film's 75th anniversary. While writing, Isenberg decided to divide the book by the film's themes rather than chronologically. Isenberg interviewed descendants of cast and crew members on the film for the book. It was published in 2017 as We'll Always Have Casablanca: The Life, Legend, and Afterlife of Hollywood's Most Beloved Movie, and was chosen as a Summer Book of 2017 in the Financial Times, while earning a spot on the bestseller list of the Los Angeles Times. In the book, Isenberg details the film's production history, as well as reactions to the film from both mainstream and African-American newspapers. He also draws attention to his conception of the film as primarily a refugee story rather than a romance.

==== Billy Wilder ====
Isenberg has written extensively on American filmmaker Billy Wilder. In 2021, he edited and introduced an anthology of Wilder's journalistic writings of the 1920s and early 30s as Billy Wilder on Assignment: Dispatches from Weimar Berlin and Interwar Vienna. It was selected by distinguished playwright Tom Stoppard as a 2021 Book of the Year in the Times Literary Supplement. Isenberg is currently working on a cultural history of Wilder's Some Like It Hot as well as a short biography of Wilder for the Yale Jewish Lives series. For his Some Like It Hot book, he was a faculty research fellow at the Harry Ransom Center in spring 2022. For his work on Wilder, he was selected as a 2026 Guggenheim fellow.

==== Other work ====
In 2016, Isenberg wrote an introduction to the reissue of Vicki Baum's 1929 novel Grand Hotel for the New York Review of Books Classics series. Isenberg serves on the editorial board of the academic journals Film Quarterly and New Review of Film and Television Studies. He is also on the Editorial Advisory Board of the British Film Institute's Screen Studies list and of WeimarCinema.org. He has provided video and audio commentaries for the Criterion Collection, Kino Lorber, and the Cohen Media Group. Isenberg is a standing fellow at the New York Institute for the Humanities, and was the recipient of an inaugural National Endowment for the Humanities Public Scholar Award in 2015-16. His writing has appeared in a number of diverse publications including The Nation, New York Times Book Review, The New Republic, Bookforum, Chronicle of Higher Education, The Paris Review Daily, The Daily Beast, Salon, the Times Literary Supplement, and the Wall Street Journal.

== Select bibliography ==
=== Books (selected) ===
- "Billy Wilder on Assignment: Dispatches from Weimar Berlin and Interwar Vienna" (Princeton, NJ: Princeton University Press, 2021)
- "We'll Always Have ‘Casablanca’: The Life, Legend, and Afterlife of Hollywood's Most Beloved Movie" (New York: W.W. Norton; London: Faber & Faber; Budapest: Európa, 2017)
- "Edgar G. Ulmer: A Filmmaker at the Margins " (Berkeley, CA: University of California Press, 2014)
- "Editor, Weimar Cinema: An Essential Guide to Classic Films of the Era" (New York: Columbia University Press, 2009)
- "Detour" (London: British Film Institute, 2008)
- "Editor and translator, with a critical introduction, The Face of East European Jewry by Arnold Zweig" (Berkeley, CA: University of California Press, 2004)
- "Between Redemption and Doom: The Strains of German-Jewish Modernism" (Lincoln, NE: University of Nebraska Press, 1999; paperback edition 2008).

=== Articles (selected) ===
- "A Man In Transit" (The Nation, 2022)
- "The Making of Billy Wilder" (The Paris Review, 2021)
- "Why Movie Musicals Work" (The New York Times, 2019)
- "Making the Movies Un-American" (The New Republic, 2018)
- "Voluptuous Panic" (The New York Review of Books, 2018)
- "Hollywood's Biggest Stars Seen Inside and Out" (The New York Times, 2017)
- "The Poet of Ill Tidings" (The Nation, 2017)
- "Casablanca's Refugee Tale is shockingly Relevant for 2017" (The Daily Beast, 2017)
- "The Reluctant Enthusiast: Orson Welles on Casablanca" (The Paris Review, 2017)
- "The Making of Steven Spielberg (review essay on Molly Haskell, Steven Spielberg: A Life in Films)"(New Republic, 2017)
- "Eavesdropping on Weimar" (The New York Review of Books, 2016)
- "Maniacal Quests (review essay on Werner Herzog, Of Walking on Ice)" (The Nation, 2016)
- "Made in Hollywood: Budd Schulberg's Centennial" (The Paris Review Daily, 2014)
- "Grand Collusion (Rev. of Ben Urwand, The Collaboration: Hollywood's Pact with Hitler)," ( Bookforum, 2014)
- "Other Worlds: Edgar G. Ulmer's Underground Films of the 1950s" (Los Angeles Review of Books, 2013)
- "A Last Gasp of Stale Air: Edgar G. Ulmer's late noir Murder Is My Beat" (Moving Image Source, 2013.)
- "Play It Again, Sam’—and Again and Again" (Wall Street Journal, 2012.)
- ""Illuminations" (Rev. of Miriam Hansen, Cinema and Experience: Siegfried Kracauer, Walter Benjamin, Theodor W. Adorno" ( Bookforum, 2012)
