= Wayne Woodson =

American actor

- Born: Melvin Wayne Woodson; January 13, 1949 (age 77); Gary, Indiana
- Occupation: Actor
- Years active: 1980s

Wayne Woodson is a stage and film actor who appeared in a number of films in the 1980s which include the Paul Wendkos made for television drama, The Five of Me and Norbert Meisel's 1985 crime action film, Walking the Edge He was also in the 1988 romantic comedy The Perfect Match.

== Film work ==
In 1981, he had a role as the jail guard in a Paul Wendkos directed TV drama The Five of Me which starred David Birney, Dee Wallace, Mitch Ryan and James Whitmore. The following year, he had a part in the 1982 film I Ought to Be in Pictures which was written by Neil Simon and directed by Herbert Ross. This film starred Walter Matthau, Ann-Margret and Dinah Manoff.

He played the part of McKee, a criminal gang member in the Norbert Meisel directed 1983 revenge film Walking the Edge, which starred Robert Forster and Nancy Kwan. His slick character, was a member of a ruthless criminal gang which included Jesus (played by Luis Contreras) and Jimmy (played by James McIntire). The gang which had killed a woman's husband and son were led by Bruster played by Joe Spinnell.

In 1988, he appeared in A Perfect Match, a romantic comedy about a man and woman pretending to be people they are not. It starred Mark McClure, Jennifer Edwards and Rob Paulsen and was directed by Mark Deimel.

== Filmography ==
Film
Title	Role	Director	Year	Notes #
The Five of Me	Jail Guard	Paul Wendkos	1981	
I Ought to Be in Pictures	Baseball fan	Herbert Ross	1982	
Walking the Edge	McKee	Norbert Meisel	1983	
The Perfect Match	Tim's Boss	Mark Deimel	1988	

Television shows
Title	Episode	Role	Director	Year	Notes #
Frank's Place	"Frank Returns"	Happy Dinner Guest	Hugh Wilson	1987	
