= Extreme Prejudice (film) =

1987 American film by Walter Hill

- Theatrical release poster
- Directed by: Walter Hill
- Screenplay by: Deric Washburn; Harry Kleiner
- Story by: John Milius; Fred Rexer
- Produced by: Buzz Feitshans; Mario Kassar
- Starring: Nick Nolte; Powers Boothe; Michael Ironside; María Conchita Alonso; Rip Torn
- Cinematography: Matthew F. Leonetti
- Edited by: Freeman A. Davies; David Holden; Billy Weber
- Music by: Jerry Goldsmith
- Production company: Carolco Pictures
- Distributed by: Tri-Star Pictures
- Release date: April 24, 1987
- Running time: 104 minutes
- Country: United States
- Language: English
- Budget: $22 million
- Box office: $11.3 million

Extreme Prejudice is a 1987 American neo-Western action thriller film directed by Walter Hill, from a screenplay by Harry Kleiner and Deric Washburn, from a story by John Milius and Fred Rexer. It stars Nick Nolte and Powers Boothe, with a supporting cast including Michael Ironside, María Conchita Alonso, Rip Torn, William Forsythe, and Clancy Brown.

Set in South Texas near the U.S.-Mexico border, the film's plot centers on the conflict between two former friends-turned-rivals, one a Texas Ranger (Nolte) and one a drug trafficker (Boothe), who both become embroiled in a political conspiracy involving a black ops military unit. The film was released by Tri-Star Pictures on April 24, 1987. It received a positive critical response, but was not a financial success.

Extreme Prejudice is an homage, of sorts, to The Wild Bunch, a western directed by Sam Peckinpah, with whom Hill worked on The Getaway. Both films end with a massive gunfight in a Mexican border town. The title originates from "terminate with extreme prejudice", a phrase popularized by Apocalypse Now, also written by Milius.

== Plot ==
At the airport in El Paso, Texas, five U.S. Army sergeants meet up with Major Paul Hackett, the leader of the clandestine Zombie Unit, composed of soldiers reported to be killed in action and on temporary assignment under Hackett for the duration of a secret mission.

Jack Benteen is a tough Texas Ranger. His best friend from high school is Cash Bailey, a former police leaker who has crossed into Mexico and become a major cocaine trafficker. Bailey tries to bribe Benteen to look the other way while sending major flake shipments to the U.S. When Benteen refuses, he is left with a warning by Bailey: Look the other way, or die trying.

Benteen and his friend, Sheriff Hank Pearson, are ambushed by Bailey's men at a gas station outside of town, and Pearson is killed in the shootout; Benteen realizes Bailey set them up. Two of Bailey's men escape the shootout and try to steal Hackett's vehicle but are killed.

The Zombie Unit arrives in town tracking Bailey. When they attempt to rob a local bank, the getaway is inadvertently foiled; one member, Luther Fry, is killed and two others - Buck Atwater and Declan Patrick Coker - are caught and detained by Benteen in the process. Benteen discovers the men are listed as dead in all official records, and their ammunition is the kind issued to members of the Army Special Forces.

Benteen is confronted at his home by Major Hackett, who tells him they were robbing the bank in order to get Bailey's money and a safety deposit box containing accounts on all the drug money deposited in his name. Bailey was a previous government informant under Hackett's management, who turned rogue, and Hackett is leading an off-the-books mission to eliminate him and the documents linking him to the U.S. Government.

Now understanding the full story, Benteen teams up with the soldiers and crosses the border into Mexico to track down Bailey and end his snow running operation. At Bailey's hacienda, they are joined by Benteen's girlfriend Sarita Cisneros, who was once Bailey's woman and has followed Benteen into Mexico.

At an Independence Day festival, Benteen confronts Bailey while the soldiers prepare to attack Bailey's private army - telling them to "[terminate] with extreme prejudice," including Benteen. Hackett is caught murdering Bailey's accountant by his right-hand man Larry McRose. It is revealed that there never was a sanctioned mission - Hackett was actually Bailey's former partner who Bailey stopped cutting in, and now he is trying to get his money while covering up his own involvement in the drug trade. The orders to the "Zombie Unit" were all forged by Hackett, who intends for them to die at the mission's conclusion.

Atwater warns Benteen about Hackett's orders to be shot on sight and tells Benteen to go for himself. The town erupts into a massive gunfight, with the surviving Zombie Unit fending off both Hackett and Bailey's men, as Benteen and Sarita escape in a Jeep. McRose guns down Hackett and is killed instantly, along with the rest of the Unit, among them are Charles Biddle, Monday and Chub Luke, a coke smuggler and the brother of T.C. Luke, who was killed by Benteen in a tavern several days earlier.

Afterwards, Benteen and Bailey confront each other again in a duel. Benteen pleads with Bailey to surrender, but Bailey refuses, fires at Benteen, and Benteen returns fire, killing Bailey. Benteen strikes a deal with Bailey's right-hand man, Lupo, allowing him to take over the local dope business in exchange for being allowed to leave Mexico unharmed with Sarita; Lupo advises Benteen to return the favor for him someday, as the two walk off to an uncertain future.

== Cast ==
Credits from the AFI Catalog of Feature Films:

- Nick Nolte as Ranger Jack Benteen
- Powers Boothe as Cash Bailey
- María Conchita Alonso as Sarita Cisneros
- Michael Ironside as Major Paul Hackett
- Rip Torn as Sheriff Hank Pearson
- Clancy Brown as Master Sergeant Larry McRose
- William Forsythe as Sergeant 1st Class Buckman Atwater
- Matt Mulhern as Staff Sergeant Declan Patrick Coker
- Larry B. Scott as Sergeant 1st Class Charles Biddle
- Dan Tullis, Jr. as Sergeant 1st Class Luther Fry
- John Dennis Johnston as Merv
- Marco Rodríguez as Deputy Emil Cortez
- James Lashly as Deputy Mike Purvis
- Luis Contreras as Lupo
- Gary Carlos Cervantes as Hector
- Tommy "Tiny" Lister as Monday
- Tony Frank as Clarence King
- Mickey Jones as Chub Luke
- Kent Lipham as T.C. Luke
- Thomas Rosales Jr. as Scarza
- Lin Shaye as Employment Office clerk

== Production ==
=== Development ===
==== Under John Milius ====
The film was first announced for production in 1976, with John Milius to direct from a script he co-wrote with Fred Rexer. "It's very complicated", said Milius. "I've never been able to put what the movie's about in a few words. All I can say is it's a modern-day story about subversion and espionage."

He elaborated in a 1976 interview saying it was "about Special Forces. It's a rightwing political thriller, a rightwing Costa-Gavras film. It takes place in Texas and involves the Texas Rangers as well. I shouldn't talk about it." However he did describe one scene:

There's an operation carried out with peak efficiency where four highly trained specialists wipe out forty men. They don't wipe them out in the usual sense, because they're so good and heroic. I wanted to give the sense that these four are more than a match for forty because they're so skilled at what they do: use of explosives, automatic weapons fire, interlocking fields of fire. Their planning is so precise and perfect: they're used to thinking this way. When you come away from this battle, you're not just impressed with their skill, but also with how cold they are. Ruthlessly efficient.

He also said there was a line in the film "where a Ranger is talking about being in a gunfight with people in a car and the other guy says, 'That gun won't stop a car', and the Ranger says, 'It will if you shoot it in the driver.' That's a Milius line. I'm trying to get away from that; the rest of the script is very flat. I'm trying to write more mundane now. Rather than dazzle constantly, I'm trying to let the weight of the story carry it, and the more subtle implications of it, letting scenes play themselves out the way they would in reality. We'll see what happens. It's a definite development."

In an interview for the July 1978 issue of Crawdaddy magazine, Milius spoke about the film as a future project, giving away the original ending. "A group of drug dealers take over a town in Texas, then finally one person, a Vietnam veteran, stands up to them and wipes them out. Then we cut to a meeting room at the Pentagon, where we find out it was all a top secret experiment to find out how far Americans can be pushed before they fight back."

The film was to be made in October 1976 in Texas, but Milius instead decided to make Big Wednesday. Rexer later worked as the military advisor on Apocalypse Now (written by Milius) and Red Dawn (written-directed by Milius).

==== Under Walter Hill ====
In 1982 the project was in the hands of Walter Hill. He assigned Larry Gross to do some work on the script before the latter did work on 48 Hrs.

In 1983 it was reported that Carolco Pictures, then flush with money from the success of First Blood, had purchased the script from Warner Bros and were hoping for Ted Kotcheff to direct. Milius was reportedly rewriting the script to bring it up to date.

In 1985 Jonathan Demme was linked to the project. Then Carolco signed Walter Hill to direct and he hired Harry Kleiner to rewrite the film. Hill had known Kleiner from the film Bullitt, on which Hill was an assistant director and Kleiner the writer; Hill was impressed by Kleiner's talent for writing and rewriting on the set daily, which he needed for this film.

Lukas Heller, who had co-written Blue City (1986) with Hill, did uncredited revisions on the script.

=== Casting ===
The lead role was played by Nick Nolte with whom Hill had made 48 Hrs. Hill:

I wanted someone who was representative of the tradition of the American West—taciturn, stoical, enduring. Someone who carried a lot of pain with him. I told Nick, "The kind of thing I'm talking about is Cooperesque." I had him look at a lot of Gary Cooper films.

Nick Nolte said the role made a change of pace for him:

It was a chance to play a morally perfect character. Like Walter said, we spent a lot of time looking at old films to get this Old West flavor. We looked at Wayne films, at Cooper films, at Randolph Scott films. Yeah, there's a lot of High Noon in this movie. There's a lot of Howard Hawks director of Red River. There's a lot of Sam Peckinpah ... I needed to find the demeanor of how those '40s characters carried themselves—how they dressed and carried their guns.

Nolte got writer friend Peter Gent, who had written North Dallas Forty, to recommend a real-life Texas Ranger to act as a model for his character. Gent suggested veteran Ranger Joaquin Jackson. Jackson later said he:

More or less edited the script with Nick. We got more into the type of language Rangers use, as well as the Rangers' relationship with other law enforcement agencies—the federal narcotics people, FBI, etc. What I'm trying to get back to the press is that it all relates back to narcotics.

Nolte spent three weeks in Texas with Jackson learning the day-to-day activities of a Ranger. Nolte took what he learned and incorporated it into his character's mannerisms and dress.

Nolte concurred:

This film is kind of about the drug wars. Walter and I wanted to do a story about the distribution of drugs, not in the city, but across the border. There's two points of view about this drug situation in America. One is educational, and the other has to do with the prevalence of drugs, the availability of them. Being a child out of the '60s, I was very much involved in drugs. If you wanted to be part of the subculture in the '60s, you had to seek out your drugs. It's different today. Kids don't have a chance. They're confronted by drugs on every block ... It sounds hypocritical, I know, but there's not so much hypocrisy being a child of the '60s and having to make this kind of change because we come from a generation that accepts change.

The role of Nolte's antagonist was played by another actor who had worked with Hill before, Powers Boothe. Boothe:

Every movie Walter's ever made is a western—it's just that people don't know it. Thematically, men standing up for themselves and making their way in the world is a theme that's been in movies throughout the world. But it's particularly an American genre, and it has to do, in my mind, with the development of our nation: you can do anything you're strong enough to do; right is right, and wrong is wrong. And at least in the movies, right wins out.

=== Shooting ===
Walter Hill had worked with Sam Peckinpah in the early 1970s on The Getaway and said he "tipped my hat to Sam a couple of times" in the film. The film contains several direct references to Peckinpah's The Wild Bunch, most notably a climactic shootout in Mexican border town.

Principal photography took place in El Paso, Texas and in Santa Clarita, California (doubling for northern Mexico). Initial plans to shoot on-location in Mexico were abandoned due to financial considerations. Studio interiors were filmed at Culver Studios.

Michael Ironside said a highlight of the film was meeting composer Ry Cooder.

Ry had an ancient guitar—it was about 100 years old—that he was using for the soundtrack, and it got stolen off the set when we were shooting. That was a priceless guitar that he'd brought in because he was giving Walter ideas on what he wanted to do. We were shooting down on one of the old sets, at the studio where they shot the burning of Atlanta in Gone with the Wind, and there were a lot of other things shooting there, so there was a lot of traffic going through the studio. I remember him coming back at one point, and he was all panicked. I said, "What's the matter?" He said, "I can't find my guitar!" Someone had just picked up his guitar case and walked off. I remember he was so devastated by that. He said, "It's not that they stole it; it's that they won't understand the value of it." He was just gutted by that. It was such a sad day.

=== Editing ===
During post-production, veteran editor Billy Weber was brought in to reduce the runtime by 45 minutes. Michael Ironside recalled that his role was reduced, notably including a subplot involving a CIA agent played by Andrew Robinson, who does not appear in the final film. Ironside:

Andy Robinson and I play CIA agents, we're trying to do this whole covert op, and my character was the go-between between the military side of the story, the police side of the story, and the government side of the story. But when they put it all together, Walter [Hill] said to me, "It looks like it's starring Michael Ironside, with Nick Nolte, Powers Boothe, and Rip Torn supporting him, so we're gonna cut the whole Andy Robinson side of the film out." [Laughs.] ... They cut something like 45 minutes out of it!

Another cut scene was the funeral of Sheriff Perason, though the soundtrack release still includes a track ("The Funeral") written for the sequence.

After filming of final shootout was done, director Walter Hill was told to include more of it so he went back and shot more footage but in the end he cut it down because, in his words, "it got too big". Several action scenes were trimmed to avoid an X rating.

=== Trailer ===
Tri-Star Pictures studio executives disliked the first version of theatrical trailer so they made their own. However, their version of the trailer made the movie look like it is ex-soldiers versus Texas Ranger type of movie, which it is not. Jerry Goldsmith composed the music for original trailer but after it was rejected the track which he composed was not used. Instead the trailer which was released included two tracks from other movies: "Paul's Theme" by Giorgio Moroder from Cat People (1982) and "Evacuation" by Mike Oldfield from The Killing Fields (1984).

== Release ==
Tri-Star announced the film as their Christmas release for the year which upset the filmmakers as they had planned to finish it by April.

=== Home media ===
The film was released on videocassette in the United States in 1987 by International Video Entertainment and again in 1989 by the same company. In 1991, it was re-released on VHS by Avid Home Entertainment, but in the EP (low-quality) mode. In 2001, Artisan Entertainment released the film on DVD in a pan-and-scan format. A DVD in the United Kingdom shows the film in widescreen and also contains the theatrical trailer as well as the teaser trailer and a 1987 five-minute documentary.

In Scandinavia a Blu-ray is available, but only in 1080i50 and a compressed English Dolby Digital 2.0 audio. In Japan a region-free 1080p Blu-ray is available with an English Dolby TrueHD 2.0 track. In France, a combo Blu-ray/DVD including a region-free 1080p Blu-ray is also available with an English DTS-HD Master Audio 2.0 stereo (possibly with forced French subtitles).

Lionsgate released a Region A 1080p Blu-ray on May 17, 2022, presented in 1.85:1 and English 2.0 DTS-HD Master Audio. It contains a commentary track with film historians C. Courtney Joyner and Henry Parke. Also included are interviews with director Walter Hill, actors Micheal Ironside and Clancy Brown, and director of photography Matthew F. Leonetti, as well as trailers and TV spots.

== Reception ==
=== Box office ===
Extreme Prejudice debuted at the U.S. box office with $3.5 million at 1,071 screens its first weekend. It was not a box office success.

=== Critical response ===
The movie received generally positive reviews. It currently holds an 82% approval rating on Rotten Tomatoes based on 11 reviews with an average rating of 7/10.

Audiences polled by CinemaScore gave the film an average grade of "C" on an A+ to F scale.

Hill later said "I don't think it was understood how much genre parodying was involved in that picture. It rather mystified a lot of American critics but it has its defenders."

Nick Nolte later said the response to the movie was "a little tougher" than the success of his previous collaboration with Hill, 48 Hrs.

Co-editor Billy Weber was also very fond of the movie despite the lukewarm reception: "Critics didn't like it, and it didn't do any business, but it's a fun movie, and it's a pure Walter movie. Powers Boothe was fantastic as the villain and of course, Nick Nolte was great. He's always great."

== Connection to other media ==
Luis Contreras reprises his role as Lupo in Hill's following film Red Heat (1988), now wearing Bailey's white suit.

== See also ==
- List of American films of 1987
