= Timothy Burrill =

British film producer (1931–2026)

Timothy Peckover Burrill (8 June 1931 – 23 July 2026) was a British film producer. He produced Chariots of Fire, The Fourth Protocol, and Supergirl. Timothy Peckover Burrill was born in St Asaph, Wales on 8 June 1931. He died on 23 July 2026, aged 95.
