= Angel City (film) =

- Genre: Drama
- Based on: Angel City by Patrick Smith
- Teleplay by: James Lee Barrett
- Directed by: Philip Leacock
- Starring: Ralph Waite; Paul Winfield; Jennifer Warren; Jennifer Jason Leigh; Mitchell Ryan
- Music by: Mark Snow
- Country of origin: United States
- Original language: English

Production
- Executive producers: John Newland; Alan Jay Factor
- Producers: Alan Jay Factor; John Newland
- Cinematography: James Pergola
- Editor: Dann Cahn
- Running time: 95 minutes
- Production company: The Factor-Newland Production Corporation

Original release
- Network: CBS
- Release: November 12, 1980

Angel City is a 1980 American drama television film directed by Philip Leacock and starring Ralph Waite, Paul Winfield, Jennifer Warren, Jennifer Jason Leigh, and Mitchell Ryan. The teleplay by James Lee Barrett is based on the 1978 novel by Patrick D. Smith. It aired on CBS on November 12, 1980.

== Premise ==
In search of a better life, Jared Teeter moves his family from West Virginia to Florida, where they end up trapped with other migrant workers at a forced labor camp run by the sadistic Silas Creedy.

== Cast ==
- Ralph Waite as Jared Teeter
- Paul Winfield as Cy
- Jennifer Warren as Cloma Teeter
- Jennifer Jason Leigh as Kristy Teeter
- Mitchell Ryan as Silas Creedy
- Robert MacNaughton as Bennie Teeter
- Red West as Sud
- Bob Minor as Jabbo
- Ken Renard as The Cook
- Pauline Myers as Bertha

== Production ==
It was originally known as Angel's Gates. Filming took place in June 1980 at the migrant camp in Homestead, Florida where Smith had worked himself. Two weeks into filming, original director Steve Carver was replaced by Leacock after a dispute between Carver and Waite (Waite had worked with Leacock on The Waltons).

Carver later claimed "I had a problem with actor Ralph Waite who came on the set drunk. I told the producers to remove him or I would leave. They said they couldn't remove him, so I left. Then they blackballed me." He said this damaged his career.
