= Howard Honig =

American film, stage and television actor

- Honig in The Incredible Hulk, 1978
- Born: Howard Mitchell Honig; April 17, 1931; New York, U.S.
- Died: November 29, 2021 (aged 90); Los Angeles, California, U.S.
- Education: Bard College
- Occupations: Film, stage and television actor
- Spouse(s): Helen Libbie Emple (m. 1953, divorced) Jeanne Lucas (m. 1960s/1970s)

Howard Mitchell Honig (April 17, 1931 – November 29, 2021) was an American film, stage and television actor. He was best known for playing Jack in the 1980 film Airplane!.

== Life and career ==
Honig was born in New York, the son of Joseph Honig. He was the brother of Morton Honig, a private in the armed forces. He attended Bard College. He began his stage career in the 1950s, and in 1952, he appeared in the stage play For Love or Money. He then began his screen career in 1968, playing the recurring role of Gaoler in the ABC Gothic soap opera television series Dark Shadows. During his screen career, in 1969, he starred as Sam in the stage play The Homecoming at the Mineola Theatre, and in 1972, he played a leading role in the musical play The Rothschilds. In 1974, he played Dr. Winbourne and the barkeep in the stage play The Freedom of the City. He also appeared in other stage plays such as The Price, Born Yesterday, The Front Page and The Three Sisters. In 1976, he appeared in the ABC action television series Starsky & Hutch.

Later in his career, Honig guest-starred in television programs including Barnaby Jones, Emergency!, Barney Miller (and its spin-off Fish), The Incredible Hulk, Rhoda, Days of Our Lives, Knots Landing, Mr. Belvedere and The Rockford Files. In 1980, he played Jack in the film Airplane!, and in 1982, he appeared in the film Airplane II: The Sequel, playing Dave Walters. He also appeared in films such as Avenging Angel (as Sergeant Hal Baylor), Walking the Edge, The Glove and City Slickers.

Honig retired from acting in 2003, last appearing in the CBS legal drama television series Judging Amy.

== Death ==
Honig died on November 29, 2021, in Los Angeles, California, at the age of 90.
