= Supergirl (1984 film) =

1984 superhero film directed by Jeannot Szwarc

- British theatrical release poster
- Directed by: Jeannot Szwarc
- Screenplay by: David Odell
- Based on: Supergirl by: Otto Binder; Al Plastino
- Produced by: Timothy Burrill
- Starring: Helen Slater; Faye Dunaway; Hart Bochner; Peter Cook; Mia Farrow; Marc McClure; Brenda Vaccaro; Peter O'Toole
- Cinematography: Alan Hume
- Edited by: Malcolm Cooke
- Music by: Jerry Goldsmith
- Production company: Pueblo Film AG Productions
- Distributed by: Thorn-EMI Screen Entertainment (through Columbia-EMI-Warner Distributors Limited, United Kingdom); Tri-Star Pictures (United States)
- Release dates: 19 July 1984 (United Kingdom); 21 November 1984 (United States)
- Running time: 105 minutes (US theatrical cut); 124 minutes (international cut); 138 minutes (director's cut)
- Countries: United Kingdom; United States
- Language: English
- Budget: $35 million
- Box office: $14.3 million

Supergirl is a 1984 superhero film directed by Jeannot Szwarc and written by David Odell, based on the DC Comics character. It is a spin-off from the Superman film series and is set after the events of Superman III (1983). The film stars Helen Slater as Supergirl, along with Faye Dunaway, Hart Bochner, Peter Cook, Mia Farrow, Brenda Vaccaro, and Peter O'Toole, with Marc McClure reprising his role as Jimmy Olsen from the Superman films. It is the fourth film in the Superman film series, and serving as a spin-off sequel of the series.

The film was released by Thorn-EMI Screen Entertainment (through Columbia-EMI-Warner Distributors Limited) in the United Kingdom on 19 July 1984 and by Tri-Star Pictures in the United States on 21 November 1984, to generally negative reviews from critics. It underperformed at the box office, grossing $14 million against a $35 million budget. Dunaway and O'Toole earned Golden Raspberry Award nominations for Worst Actress and Worst Actor, respectively. Slater was nominated for a Saturn Award for Best Actress. The film's failure ultimately led producers Alexander and Ilya Salkind to sell the Superman film rights to The Cannon Group, Inc. in 1986. Another Supergirl film would not be produced until 2026, when DC Studios released the DC Universe film Supergirl, with Milly Alcock in the title role.

== Plot ==
Kara Zor-El, cousin of Kal-El, and Jor-El's niece, lives in Argo City, an isolated community that survived the planet Krypton's destruction (Note: As depicted in the 1978 film Superman.) by being transported into a pocket of trans-dimensional space, called the "Innerspace". Zaltar, a wizard, has allowed Kara to observe a powerful item known as the "Omegahedron," which powers Argo and which he has borrowed without the knowledge of the city's government. However, a mishap leads to the Omegahedron being rocketed into space. Taking a ship, Kara follows the Omegahedron to Earth, transforming to "Supergirl" in the process, to recover it and save Argo City.

On Earth, the Omegahedron is recovered by Selena, a power-hungry would-be witch assisted by the feckless Bianca, seeking to free herself from a relationship with the warlock (and school teacher) Nigel. Whilst not knowing exactly what it is, Selena quickly realizes the Omegahedron is powerful and can give her true magic. Kara arrives on Earth and is granted new powers by its environment and the radiation of its sun like Superman. While seeking the Omegahedron, she creates the cover identity "Linda Lee" and enrolls at an all-girls school where she befriends Lois Lane's sister Lucy Lane. Kara also meets and becomes enamored with Ethan, a school groundskeeper.

Ethan also catches the eye of Selena, who drugs him with a love potion, which will make him fall in love with the first person he sees for a day. Ethan regains consciousness in Selena's absence and wanders out into the streets. An angry Selena uses her newfound powers to animate a construction vehicle to retrieve Ethan, causing chaos as it does so. Supergirl, in the guise of Linda, rescues Ethan, and he falls in love with her instead. Declaring that nobody gets in her way, Selena desires to seek out the student.

While trying to deal with the love-obsessed Ethan at an amusement park ride, Linda is ambushed by Selena before she turns into Supergirl and traps Selena temporarily in wires. Later on, back home, Selena enlists Nigel to teleport Ethan away in order to get Supergirl to come to them. Selena captures Ethan, then traps Supergirl and sends her to the Phantom Zone, a prison dimension. Now powerless, Supergirl wanders the bleak landscape and nearly drowns in an oily bog. Eventually, she encounters Zaltar, who has exiled himself to the Phantom Zone as punishment for losing the Omegahedron and sacrifices himself to help her escape. Back on Earth, Selena uses the Omegahedron to make herself a princess, with Ethan as her lover and consort, to go along with a mountain fortress and bikers to guard against dissent.

Emerging from the Phantom Zone through a mirror, Supergirl regains her powers and confronts Selena, who uses the Omegahedron to summon a shadow demon known as The Power of Shadow. The demon is on the verge of defeating Supergirl when she hears Zaltar's voice urging her to fight on. Supergirl breaks free, and Nigel tells her the only way to defeat Selena is to turn the demon against her. Supergirl complies and creates a focused whirlwind that traps Selena, who is then attacked and incapacitated by the demon as the whirlwind pulls in Bianca as well. The three are sucked through the mirror portal and trapped inside. Free from Selena's spell, Ethan admits his love for Linda, knowing she and Supergirl are the same. He also understands she must save Argo City and that he may not see her again. Kara returns the Omegahedron to Argo City, which then lights up again.

== Cast ==
- Helen Slater as Kara Zor-El / Linda Lee / Supergirl
- Faye Dunaway as Selena
- Peter O'Toole as Zaltar
- Hart Bochner as Ethan
- Mia Farrow as Alura In-Ze
- Brenda Vaccaro as Bianca
- Peter Cook as Nigel
- Simon Ward as Zor-El
- Marc McClure as Jimmy Olsen
- Maureen Teefy as Lucy Lane
- David Healy as Mr. Danvers
- Sandra Dickinson as Pretty Young Lady
- Matt Frewer as Eddie, The Truck Driver
- Kelly Hunter as Argonian Citizen
- Glory Annen as Midvale Protester
- Bradley Lavelle as Lucy's Friend

=== Cast notes ===
Christopher Reeve was slated to have a cameo as Superman, but bowed out early on. His non-appearance in the film is explained via a news broadcast (overheard by Selena) stating that Superman has left Earth on a "peace-seeking mission" to a distant galaxy. In the Superman documentary You Will Believe..., director Jeannot Szwarc said Reeve's involvement in this film would have given the feature higher credibility, and admitted he wished Reeve had made a contribution to the film's production. A publicity photo of him as Superman does appear as a poster in Lucy and Linda's shared dorm room.

Marc McClure makes his fourth of five appearances in the Superman-related films; he is the only actor to appear in all four films featuring Superman and this spin-off film. Demi Moore auditioned for and was cast as Lucy Lane, but left to make the film Blame It on Rio.

== Production ==
After gaining the film rights for Superman: The Movie in the 1970s, Alexander Salkind and his son Ilya also purchased the rights to the character of Supergirl, should any sequel or spin-off occur. Supergirl was originally slated to debut in Superman III in a plot line intended to set up a standalone film, but her character was ultimately removed. The Salkinds announced the Supergirl film in April 1982, before production began on Superman III. After the critical disappointment of that film, the Salkinds opted to use the Supergirl movie to freshen the franchise. Ilya later recounted, "[It was] something different, to an extent. I thought it was a very different area to explore." Originally, the plot was to center on Supergirl rescuing Superman, who would be portrayed as her cousin and mentor, but the film was heavily rewritten after Reeve chose not to be involved.

The producers attempted, and failed, to get the services of Richard Lester, who had directed Superman III and had completed the second film after their dismissal of original director Richard Donner. Robert Wise also turned down the director's chair. But French filmmaker Jeannot Szwarc, who was best known at that time for his work in television and for directing Jaws 2, was chosen after a meeting with Christopher Reeve, who had complimented him. Szwarc sought advice from Donner over some technical aspects of the production.

Hundreds of actresses tested for the role of Supergirl/Linda, among them Demi Moore and Brooke Shields. Moore turned it down, and Shields was rejected by both Ilya and Szwarc, who wanted an unknown actress, and they instead signed Helen Slater, who was paid $75,000 in a three-picture deal. Slater had four months of physical training to prepare for the role. Additionally, Dolly Parton turned down the role of Selena before it was offered to Dunaway.

Principal photography began at Pinewood Studios near London on 18 April 1983, and wrapped on 11 August 1983. Although the Salkinds financed the film completely on their own budget, Warner Bros. was still involved in the production since the studio owned the distribution rights to the film, and its parent company, Warner Communications, was also the parent company of DC Comics, owners of all "Superman and Superman family" copyrights. The entire film was shot, edited, and overseen under the supervision of Warner Bros. and originally scheduled to be released in July 1984. However, the relationship between the studio and the partnership was strained after the critical and commercial underperformance of Superman III in June 1983, during the production of the film. The Salkinds insisted on moving the opening date from the summer to the holiday season to avoid competition with other major films and the 1984 Summer Olympics in Los Angeles. The studio claimed it could not provide a holiday slot and relinquished its distribution rights of Supergirl to the Salkinds, who gave the distribution rights to Tri-Star Pictures. The film proceeded to be released overseas, however, and received a Royal Film Premiere in the United Kingdom in 1 July.

== Music ==
Supergirl: Original Motion Picture Soundtrack

Film score by Jerry Goldsmith
- Released: 1985
- Recorded: 1984
- Genre: Soundtrack
- Length: 39:35 (Varèse Sarabande); 77:37 (Silva Screen)

Professional ratings
Review scores
Source	Rating
Allmusic	link
Filmtracks	link

The film score for Supergirl was composed and conducted by Jerry Goldsmith, who had been the initial interest of director Richard Donner to compose for the first Superman film. Goldsmith used several techniques to identify the music to the film, such as synthesizers simulating the sounds of take-off during the main theme. The soundtrack has been released twice, through Varèse Sarabande in 1985 and an extended version through Silva Screen in 1993. It has also been referred to by critics as one of the only redeeming qualities of the movie.

"The Superman Poster", included on the 1993 release, incorporates John Williams's Superman theme.

1985 Varèse Sarabande Album

1. "Main Title" (3:12)
2. "'Where Is She?'" (1:05)
3. "Black Magic" (4:06)
4. "First Flight" (4:14)
5. "The Butterfly" (1:34)
6. "'Where Is Linda?'" (1:14)
7. "The Monster Tractor" (7:26)
8. "The Bracelet" (1:24)
9. "Monster Storm" (2:55)
10. "A New School" (2:08)
11. "The Flying Car" (1:25)
12. "The Map" (1:10)
13. "9M-3" (1:41)
14. "End Title" (6:05)

1993 Silva Screen Album

1. "Overture" (6:07)
2. "Main Title & Argo City" (3:15)
3. "Argo City Mall" (0:56)
4. "The Butterfly" (1:36)
5. "The Journey Begins" (1:12)
6. "Arrival on Earth/Flying Ballet" (5:36)
7. "Chicago Lights/Street Attack" (2:23)
8. "The Superman Poster" (0:52)
9. "A New School" (2:13)
10. "The Map" (1:10)
11. "Ethan Spellbound" (2:13)
12. "The Monster Tractor" (7:34)
13. "Flying Ballet - Alternate Version" (2:13)
14. "The Map - Alternate Version" (1:13)
15. "The Bracelet" (1:44)
16. "First Kiss/The Monster Storm" (4:35)
17. "'Where Is She'/The Monster Bumper Cars" (2:57)
18. "The Flying Bumper Car" (1:28)
19. "'Where's Linda?'" (1:21)
20. "Black Magic" (4:08)
21. "The Phantom Zone" (3:42)
22. "The Vortex/The End of Zaltar" (5:49)
23. "The Final Showdown & Victory/End Title - Short Version" (12:10)

== Release ==
=== Home media ===
International Video Entertainment paid $3.2 million for North American home video rights, one of the largest deals at the time, and released the Tri-Star-edited 105-minute U.S. version in 1985. The film has since been released several times on VHS, Betamax, laserdisc, and DVD. In 1990, the same 105-minute U.S. cut was re-released on VHS by Avid Home Entertainment. By the mid-1990s, the rights to the film were acquired by Pueblo Film Licensing (successor-in-interest to the Salkind production company) and French production company StudioCanal. By this time, Anchor Bay Entertainment had assumed the video rights, where it was reissued on VHS in 1998 as the "114-minute cut" under the Anchor Bay Entertainment Family Movies label. Its first DVD release was by the independent home video company Anchor Bay Entertainment in 2000, under license from the then-rights holder StudioCanal. Warner Bros. Pictures acquired the rights to the film and reissued it on DVD late in 2006 to coincide with the release of Superman Returns. Although it is canon with the Christopher Reeve Superman films, it was often not included in any of the Superman DVD or Blu-ray box sets by Warner Bros. Pictures until the release of the 100th Anniversary Blu-ray Boxset - Action, Adventure, and Fantasy version, where it was bundled with other DC Comics films which included the Christopher Reeve Superman films, to celebrate Warner’s 100th Anniversary. For their DVD release on 8 August 2000, two versions were issued. The first of these was a 2-disc "Limited Edition" set (limited to 50,000 copies only) featuring the 124-minute "International Version" (never seen in the United States, which was digitally mastered by THX for this DVD release), along with a 138-minute "director's cut", which had been discovered in StudioCanal's archives. The second version was a single-disc version featuring the 124-minute "International Version", with many bonus features: a 16-page full color booklet; Audio Commentary with Director Jeannot Szwarc and Special Project Consultant Scott Michael Bosco; "The Making of Supergirl" Featurette; U.S. & Foreign Theatrical Trailers; U.S. TV Spots; Original Storyboards; Still & Poster Galleries; and Talent Bios (these extra features were also available on the 2-disc "Limited Edition" set). Anchor Bay reissued a new VHS release once again, this time the 124-minute "International Version" coinciding with the DVD release, both a separate fullscreen and widescreen editions (widescreen version labeled as the "Collector's Edition") under different packaging artwork and digitally mastered by THX. The "Director's Cut" DVD was made from the last print known to exist of the cut, which was apparently prepared for possible television broadcast before the film was edited into its various versions. This longer version was never broadcast on network television in the United States, though it is believed to have been distributed in syndication worldwide.

In 2002, Anchor Bay reissued the 138-minute "Director's Cut" separately. In November 2006, coinciding with the home video release of Superman Returns, Warner Home Video, now owning the rights to the film through their parent company Warner Bros., released a single-disc DVD featuring the 124-minute "International Version" cut of the film, with only some extra material being carried over from the former out-of-print Anchor Bay releases, a commentary by director Jeannot Szwarc and Special Project Consultant Scott Bosco, and the theatrical trailer. This Warner Bros. release includes an edited version of the audio commentary from the Anchor Bay release. All comments about Anchor Bay are edited out.

It was reissued on 17 July 2018, under the Warner Archive Collection label as a two–disc set, with the International Cut on Blu-ray (in a new 1080p HD remaster), and the "Director's Cut" on DVD, mastered in SD as the only surviving element of the longer version is from the same StudioCanal print used for the previous Anchor Bay release. The commentary from the 2000 video release, "The Making of Supergirl" Featurette, and a theatrical trailer were carried over to WAC's latest issue.

=== Deleted material ===
Prototype costume based on the actual 1984 comic book costume at the time, used only for camera test shoots and lighting

Material that was cut for the 105-minute version of the film included the Argo City opening, which was originally longer.

Another cut scene from the U.S. release is known as the "flying ballet", though included in the International Cut. As Supergirl arrives on Earth, she is surprised to find herself capable of almost anything, especially flying. She can use her super-strength to crack rocks into dust, and use her heat-ray vision to help flowers grow.

Scenes concerning Selena, Bianca, and Nigel were also trimmed. In the U.S. version, Selena's introduction was merely a few lines long when the Omegahedron lands on Earth, and Selena takes it for the use of its magic. The full introduction establishes Selena as an impatient witch who is sick of her mentor and lover Nigel, who is himself a warlock. Later scenes not seen before the 2000 DVD release from Anchor Bay Entertainment include Selena using the Omegahedron for the first time and realizing that she has no control over herself when under its influence, namely the "Roast Chicken" sequence. Selena later throws a party for all her followers, and deleted material shows Nigel insulting Selena after being dismissed. Nigel then gets friendly with another party member, on whom Selena pulls a vicious magical prank.

Other scenes involve Linda Lee making a temporary home in the city of Midvale, Illinois, and an extended version of the tractor sequence in which the possessed machine runs amok on the Midvale streets and kills a civilian. This alleged death scene does not appear in either the International or the 2000 Director's Cut. Another cut scene shows Supergirl unable to find the Omegahedron because Selena keeps it in a lead box, demonstrating that Supergirl's limitations are similar to those of her cousin. The Phantom Zone scenes are also longer.

The 2006 DVD release and current Blu-ray reissue by Warner Home Video, whose parent company, Warner Bros., is the current rights holder to the Superman movies, contains the International Edition, also called the "European Theatrical Edition". The latter release also features the Director's Cut.

Much of the deleted material appeared in DC Comics' one-shot comic book adaptation of the film, primarily the scenes that fleshed out Selena's character.

==== Broadcast television version ====
The American theatrical cut of Supergirl ran at 105 minutes. Supergirl originally ran at 124 minutes in its European version. When it aired on network television in 1987, ABC added numerous scenes from the International theatrical version as well as sequences not contained in any other edit. Shown in a two-hour slot, this 92-minute version was essentially a cut-down version of the Director's Cut, otherwise resembling the U.S. edit, with "offensive" dialogue dubbed over for TV. This same 92-minute version was also seen in syndication on most stations (as well as superstations such as TBS and WGN) by Viacom.

Some broadcast television versions have a scene not seen in either laserdisc edition: After Selena's defeat, Nigel is standing on the street. He bends over to pick up the Coffer of Shadows, now restored to its original, small size, and decides to keep it as a memento. In another broadcast-only scene, after Supergirl flies off to return to Argo City, Ethan gets into his truck. He then stops to say goodbye to Lucy and Jimmy. Both scenes can be found in the Director's Cut.

As mentioned, the full, longer version has never been broadcast on U.S. network television.

== Reception ==
=== Box office ===
In the United States, Supergirl was picked up by Tri-Star Pictures for release on 21 November 1984. Test audiences found the film overlong, and the film was edited from 135 minutes to 105 minutes for its North American release. Critical reviews in the United States were poor, and although the film took the #1 slot at the North American box-office during its opening weekend, it is widely considered to be a box office bomb after making only $14.3 million in North America.

=== Critical response ===
Critical reviews were mixed to negative. Supergirl holds an approval rating of 19% and has an average rating of 4.1/10 on Rotten Tomatoes based on 134 reviews. Many of the reviews were negative, with Dunaway's campy performance especially reviled. The consensus reads: "The effects are cheesy, the story is aimless, and Supergirl's wide-eyed, cheery heroine simply isn't interesting." On Metacritic the film has a rating of 41 out of 100, indicating "mixed or average reviews" from 13 professional reviewers.

Colin Greenland reviewed Supergirl for Imagine magazine, and stated that "I may be old-fashioned, but I can't help wishing today's film-makers thought it worthwhile including a little logic in their fantasies, instead of having characters whose motivations, abilities and weaknesses change all the time, with no explanation whatever. A fun film, in a vacuous sort of way."

John Nubbin reviewed Supergirl for Different Worlds magazine and stated that "Although the similarities between Superman I and Supergirl are striking, this is a new picture, with a new feel. It is good, solid work, the kind nobody ever gets enough of, but which we haven't even been getting the usual quote for a long time. The film has its problems; some scenes are a bit too campy [...] some of the acting is a tad thick - but all in all, Supergirl is just the kind of boost the American theater scene needs after the dull showing of the past summer."

Janet Maslin of The New York Times expressed "some initial curiosity" about the differences between Superman and Supergirl, but that the film "quickly loses its novelty."

Roger Ebert of The Chicago Sun-Times gave Supergirl a mixed 2 stars out of a possible 4. He believed Slater was a charismatic actress who "shares with Christopher Reeve the ability to wear a funny costume and not look ridiculous", but also said the film's solid introductory act deteriorated into camp and irony when he felt this type of film must be played straight to be effective, and Supergirl deteriorated into "an unhappy, unfunny, unexciting movie".

James Lowder reviewed Supergirl in White Wolf Inphobia #57 (July 1995), rating it a 1 1/2 out of 5 and stated that "The movie's special effects vary in quality. A few of the flying sequences come close to capturing the magic of Reeve's first solo as Superman. Both the shadow monster that Dunaway conjures at the film's climax and the invisible stalker that she sends after Supergirl are well crafted [...] Unfortunately, a few good effects can't make Supergirl anything more than a mildly interesting but derivative superhero flick."

Variety referred to the film as "intermittently enjoyable spectacle" and described "some well-staged effects highlights, notably a violent storm that threatens the school and the climax which Supergirl and Selena confront each other in the latter's mountain-top castle." Audiences polled by CinemaScore gave the film an average grade of "C+" on an A+ to F scale.

Both Rita Kempley and Paul Attanasio of The Washington Post gave it positive marks. John Grant, writing in The Encyclopedia of Fantasy, was more positive about the film, describing Slater as "an exceptionally charming Supergirl" and wrote that Supergirl had some "excellent—and excellently realised—flights of imagination." Grant criticised the "inconsistent" characterization of Slater and Dunaway's characters. In conclusion, he stated that while Supergirl "was less than the sum of its parts, not all of those parts are insignificant."

=== Accolades ===
The film was nominated for two Razzie Awards, including Worst Actor for Peter O'Toole and Worst Actress for Faye Dunaway. Helen Slater was nominated for a Saturn Award for Best Actress. The film is listed in Golden Raspberry Award founder John Wilson's book, The Official Razzie Movie Guide, as one of the 100 Most Enjoyably Bad Movies Ever Made.

=== Legacy ===
Years after her single appearance as Supergirl, Helen Slater took on the recurring role of Lara, biological mother of Clark Kent, on the TV series Smallville (2001–2011), and later played the recurring character of Eliza Danvers, the adopted mother of the titular character in the TV series Supergirl (2015–2021). A CGI version of the character makes a cameo in the 2023 DC Studios film The Flash, alongside a CGI version of Christopher Reeve's Superman.

== Novelization ==
A novelization was written by Norma Fox Mazer and released in paperback form in 1984.

== Bibliography ==
- Willis, Donald, ed. (1985). Variety's Complete Science Fiction Reviews. Garland Publishing Inc. ISBN 978-0-8240-6263-7.
