= Eyes of Fire (film) =

1983 film

- Theatrical release poster
- Directed by: Avery Crounse
- Written by: Avery Crounse
- Produced by: Philip J. Spinelli
- Starring: Dennis Lipscomb; Guy Boyd; Rebecca Stanley; Karlene Crockett; Fran Ryan; Rob Paulsen; Kerry Sherman
- Narrated by: Sally Klein
- Cinematography: Wade Hanks
- Edited by: Michael Barnard
- Music by: Brad Fiedel
- Production company: Elysian Pictures
- Distributed by: Seymour Borde & Associates
- Release date: July 13, 1983 (Los Angeles)
- Running time: 86 minutes
- Country: United States
- Language: English
- Budget: $1 million–$1.5 million

Eyes of Fire is a 1983 American supernatural horror film written and directed by Avery Crounse in his directorial debut, and starring Dennis Lipscomb, Guy Boyd, Rebecca Stanley, Karlene Crockett, Fran Ryan, Rob Paulsen, and Kerry Sherman. Set in 1750 on the American frontier, the film focuses on a preacher and his followers who, after being banished from their settlement, are tormented by the spirits of French colonialists in a remote forest.

An independent production, Eyes of Fire was filmed on location in Missouri in 1983. The film premiered in Los Angeles on July 13, 1984, before receiving subsequent screenings the following year. In the years since its release, it has been noted as an example of American folk horror cinema.

== Plot ==
In 1750 on the American frontier during the colonial days, before the United States declared its independence, Fanny and Meg, a young woman and a child, have been discovered by the French military. The two relay a recent series of past events: Both fled their settlement after a new preacher, Will Smythe, is accused of having an affair with two women. The first is Fanny's mother Eloise, whose husband is away hunting for food, and another woman, Leah, who is insane. The other settlers attempt to hang them and Will is only saved when his noose rope breaks while Leah babbles incoherently.

They leave the camp with a few others who were against hanging the preacher: the couple Jewell Buchanan and Margaret Buchanan; their daughter Cathleen; Calvin and his wife, who goes by the name Sister; and their granddaughter Meg. As the group travels farther away from their town, the threat of attack from hostile Native American tribes becomes more prevalent until the group is eventually ambushed. Calvin does not survive the attack, but the others are protected by Leah, who used witchcraft to protect them. All the while the others are unaware that Leah is using magic to keep them safe. The remaining members of the group are forced to abandon their trail along the riverbank, and take cover in the woods far from man-made trails. At this time, Eloise's husband Marion Dalton returns home to find news that his wife was scheduled to be executed along with Will for adultery and also learns that the two are on the run with others from the town. Marion pursues and eventually catches up to them. Leah wanders away from the group for a short while.

By this time the Shawnee Indians have caught up to the group and Marion Dalton, who speaks fluently in many tribal languages, is able to convince the Shawnee to abort the attack, at least for a short while, though Marion is certain the Shawnee will be back in bigger numbers. Leah returns covered in white feathers and Marion recognizes this as a warning from the Shawnee Indians to other members of the Shawnee tribe not to enter a nearby valley. Realizing that the Shawnee have superstitions about the valley, Marion leads the group there, knowing that if the Shawnee were to return, they would not follow the pioneers into the valley due to their superstitious fears.

Once the group settles in the deserted valley, they are safe from any and all tribes of Native Americans. Though the pioneers are no longer under the threat of attack from the Shawnee, they find a young Native American orphan on the outskirts of their camp. The pioneers are still unnerved by the previous attacks, but reluctantly bring the girl into the camp and care for her. It seems that only Will is pleased with the orphan's unexpected appearance, and he is delighted at the possibility of baptizing her into Christianity. Aside from Will, it seems the others in the group are unnerved by the orphan girl's presence. Leah, who has an extraordinary connection to the supernatural, senses that there is something unusual about the Native American child, and Leah soon begins to have visions as she tries to uncover the motives of the orphan girl. Fanny disappears soon afterwards and is found unconscious. Marion is able to free her with Leah's help and makes plans to leave, only to have to similarly help Meg. It soon becomes obvious to all but Will that the valley was left alone for a reason. The little girl also shows her true form, an evil spirit born out of the grief and blood of every living thing that was killed. Eloise turns away from the preacher and falls back in love with Marion. Marion is captured by the spirit, as he is a threat to its power and existence. Leah helps him fight back as the spirit narrows in on Fanny and Eloise. He is freed and the spirit mortally wounded just as Eloise and Cathleen hide Meg and Fanny in a cabinet which is to be carried downstream. Leah devours the energy from the fallen spirit and uses it to save the remaining settlers, except for Will.

The film ends with the French military commander unable to believe the fantastical tale. He orders one of his men to take them away for the time being, unaware that the man has been possessed by a woodland spirit under Leah's control.

== Cast ==
- Guy Boyd as Marion Dalton
- Karlene Crockett as Leah
- Rebecca Stanley as Eloise Dalton
- Dennis Lipscomb as Will Smythe
- Sally Klein as Fanny Dalton (Narrator)
- Kerry Sherman as Margaret Buchanan
- Rob Paulsen as Jewell Buchanan
- Caitlin Baldwin as Cathleen Buchanan
- Erin Buchanan as Meg
- Fran Ryan as Sister (Calvin's Wife)
- Will Hare as Calvin
- Rose Preston as Orphan Girl (Cry Blue Sky)
- Russell James Young Jr. as Evil Spirit (Orphan Girl's True Form)

== Production ==
Filming took place in mid-1983 Stover and Lake Jacomo, Missouri at the Missouri Town 1855, on a budget of $1 million–1.5 million. The film was shot under the working title Crying Blue Sky.

== Release ==
Eyes of Fire screened theatrically in Los Angeles on July 13, 1984.

It was later released in Alexandria, Louisiana in May 1985.

=== Original cut ===
The film was originally screened with a 108-minute runtime under the title Crying Blue Sky. After seeing the film with an audience, Crounse decided to make significant cuts, removing 22 minutes of footage and releasing the film under the title Eyes Of Fire with an 86-minute runtime. Crounse explained in a 2021 interview with author Stephen Thrower that he "cut it down to something that didn't necessarily make much sense," adding that "there are some people who really loved the first version, but there was money that had to be made, so I did what needed to be done." Since its release, several commentators have expressed a preference for the longer cut, which includes more characterization and a completely different opening and closing. The Crying Blue Sky cut was released for the first time on home media as a bonus feature on the Severin Films Blu-ray released in 2021.

=== Home media ===
The film was released on VHS by Vestron Video on June 26, 1987.

After decades of being scantly available on home video, Severin Films released Eyes of Fire on Blu-ray on December 7, 2021, featuring a new 4K restoration from the original film elements. The Severin release also features an earlier cut of the film, titled Crying Blue Sky, "restored in 2K from [the] Director's personal 35mm answer print." The film was also included on Blu-ray in All the Haunts Be Ours, a limited edition Blu-ray boxed set by Severin featuring twenty international feature films in the folk horror genre.

== Reception ==
=== Critical response ===
Caryn James from The New York Times gave the film a somewhat neutral review, calling it "an imagistic morality tale" and "a bizarrely fascinating story told in flashback", but also was somewhat critical saying "If Mr. Crounse had stayed poised on the line between human reality and horrific visions of evil, he might have turned out a small masterpiece, or at least a cult film. As it is, Eyes of Fire is an ambitious idea gone haywire, as if The Scarlet Letter had zoomed into the future and collided with the movie version of The Exorcist." Dennis Schwartz from Ozus' World Movie Reviews awarded the film a grade B. In his review, Schwartz wrote, "The arty horror pic, not for all tastes... Though it's a flawed film, its strange storyline captivated me despite such obvious flaws as the performances were mostly inadequate, the story had choppy moments and the special effects were cheesy." HorrorNews.net gave the film a positive review, calling it "creepy", and "artistically beautiful". Steven Ryder from Critics Associated.com awarded the film 4 out of 4 stars, praising the film's atmosphere, tone, and sense of dread; writing, "[it] may not be blessed with the same production values or talent that these later films are yet the electric aura and commitment to unrelenting dread make Eyes of Fire an almost-forgotten paragon of folk horror." Author Edmund G. Bansak compared the film favorably to the films by Val Lewton, commending the film's acting, atmosphere, cinematography, and "authentic period flavor", while also noting that the film deteriorated towards the end.

== Sources ==
- Bansak, Edmund G. (2003). Fearing the Dark: The Val Lewton Career. Jefferson, North Carolina: McFarland & Company. ISBN 978-0-7864-1709-4.
- Young, R. G. (2000). The Encyclopedia of Fantastic Film: Ali Baba to Zombies. New York City, New York: Applause. ISBN 978-1-55783-269-6.
