= Walking the Edge =

- Video release poster
- Directed by: Norbert Meisel
- Written by: Curt Allen
- Produced by: Sergei Goncharoff
- Starring: Robert Forster; Nancy Kwan; Joe Spinell; A Martinez; James McIntire; Wayne Woodson; Luis Contreras; Russ Courtney
- Edited by: Warren Chadwick
- Music by: Jay Chattaway
- Distributed by: Empire Pictures
- Release date: January 11, 1985
- Running time: 93 minutes
- Country: United States
- Language: English

Walking the Edge is a 1985 crime film and action film directed by Norbert Meisel, written by Curt Allen and starring Robert Forster, Nancy Kwan, Joe Spinell, A Martinez, James McIntire, Wayne Woodson, Luis Contreras.

== Plot ==
A criminal gang led by Brusstar enters a home with the intention of killing a man. A housewife, Christine, survives the hit that kills her husband and young son. Shocked, she discovers that her upstanding citizen of a husband was a drug dealer. She decides to take revenge on the criminal gang that has murdered her husband and son.

A down on his luck L.A. taxi driver and numbers runner, Jason Walk unwittingly becomes involved and helps her in her quest to survive and take revenge on the people who murdered her family.

== Cast ==
- Robert Forster as Jason Walk
- Nancy Kwan as Christine Holloway
- Joe Spinell as Brusstar
- A Martinez as Tony
- James McIntire as Jimmy
- Wayne Woodson as McKee
- Doug Toby as Danny Holloway
- Phil H. Fravel as Jerry Holloway
- Luis Contreras as Jesus
- Terrence Beasor as Bob, The Gambler
- Bernard Erhard as Fat Man
- Jim Fitzpatrick as Fat Man's Bodyguard (credited as James Fitzpatrick)
- Ivy Bethune as Mrs. Johnson
- Jacqueline Giroux as Linda (credited as Jackie Giroux)
- Aarika Wells as Julia
- Howard Honig as Ron
- Frankie Hill as Delia
- Russ Courtney as Leon
- Jerry Jones as Gabby
- Leonard D'John as Mickey
- Peter Pan as Chinese Herbalist
- Jamie V. Arias as Tango Man
- Rosa M. Torres as Tango Woman
- Stan Kamber as Punk Rock Bartender
- Falling Idols as Punk Band

== Home media ==
The film was released on videocassette in 1985 by Vestron Video. Afterwards, Anchor Bay released the film onto DVD in 2000. The DVD contained a commentary by director Norbert Meisel and stars Nancy Kwan and Robert Forster. Fun City Editions will release the film on Blu-ray in 2021 with a new 4K restoration from the original 35mm camera negative.
