= After Midnight (1989 film) =

1989 film directed by Ken and Jim Wheat

- Directed by: Ken Wheat; Jim Wheat
- Written by: Ken Wheat; Jim Wheat
- Produced by: Richard Arlook; Peter Greene; Ken Wheat; Jim Wheat
- Starring: Marg Helgenberger; Marc McClure; Alan Rosenberg; Pamela Segall; Nadine van der Velde; Ramy Zada; Jillian McWhirter
- Cinematography: Phedon Papamichael Jr.
- Edited by: Cari Coughlin (segment "All Night Operator"); Phillip Linson; Quinnie Martin Jr.
- Music by: Marc Donahue
- Distributed by: Metro-Goldwyn-Mayer
- Release date: November 3, 1989
- Running time: 90 minutes
- Country: United States
- Language: English
- Budget: $3.5 million
- Box office: $76,329

After Midnight is a 1989 American horror anthology film written and directed by Ken and Jim Wheat and starring Marg Helgenberger, Marc McClure, Alan Rosenberg, and Pamela Segal. Besides the three stories within the film, there is a wraparound story with a deus ex machina at the end.

== Plot ==
=== Prologue ===
Allison and Cheryl are two college students in a new class, "The Psychology of Fear". It is taught by a strange professor named Edward Derek. One of Derek's in-class experiments involving a revolver makes jock Russ urinate in his pants, humiliating him. This leads to the censuring of the class by the university, to which Professor Derek responds by inviting his students to his home for a private lesson. Allison reluctantly attends with Cheryl. There, he tells the students three tales centered on fear.

=== The Old Dark House ===
Couple Joan and Kevin are celebrating Kevin's birthday. After a dinner, Joan suggests they drive on an old highway along the coastline. A tire blows out, leaving the couple stranded, and Kevin notices tacks lying across the road. Joan suggests asking for a phone at a dilapidated mansion nearby, much to Kevin's reluctance. Once inside, the couple become separated, and Kevin finds a room with human skulls arranged on a table.

In a parlor, he is confronted by Joan, who dons a mask on the back of her head, and brandishes shears, before the doors close. Unbeknownst to him, Joan and all of the couple's friends are waiting in the room—the entire event was orchestrated as a prank followed by a surprise party. As their friends open the door to reveal Joan with a birthday cake, a panicked Kevin unintentionally decapitates her with a sword.

=== A Night on the Town ===
Four underage young women—Jennifer, Lisa, Amy, and Kelly—sneak into a downtown Los Angeles club but are kicked out. Afterwards, they get lost in a seedy industrial section of town. Realizing they are out of gas, they stop at an apparently empty station. Jennifer and Lisa enter the station garage, where they are confronted by a perverted attendant and his band of violent dogs. He holds both girls at knifepoint.

When the two fail to return, Kelly and Amy investigate. Kelly manages to knock the man unconscious, but before they can escape he leaps onto the roof of the convertible. They begin driving down the street while the man stabs through the convertible top, but eventually crash, killing him. They are only momentarily safe, however, as his dogs begin running toward the vehicle. Amy exits the car on foot, but is killed by the dogs. The car runs out of gas, and the three others are pursued on foot in an alleyway. They manage to trail the dogs into a chemical warehouse, where they trigger an explosion, killing all the dogs.

=== All Night Operator ===
Alex, an employee at a telephone messaging service, returns to work after breaking her leg during a ski trip. During the night shift, Alex receives numerous calls from an unhinged man, Richard, who is obsessively attempting to reach Vanessa Birch, one of the company's clients. When Alex relays the message to Vanessa, Vanessa informs her she is being stalked by Richard. Richard calls again, and Alex denies having spoken with Vanessa. When Alex calls Vanessa's home again to inform her of Richard's second call, she is met by Richard on the phone—he has broken into the home and killed Vanessa.

When Alex phones her boss, Molly, she agrees to come to the call center, but she is killed in the elevator by Richard. Alex attempts to flee as Richard pursues her in a stairwell, and returns to her small office. However, she kills Ray, the security guard, having mistaken him for Richard. The phone rings, and Alex answers, unaware Richard is calling from right behind her.

=== Epilogue ===
Professor Derek goes to light the pilot in the basement, where he is attacked by Russ, seeking revenge. Derek is hung upside down and dangled over a ring of fire. Allison, Cheryl, and the other students rush downstairs, paralyzed by fear. Derek manages to come loose from the trap, and attacks Russ, bludgeoning him with an axe. A can of accelerant left on the floor combusts, resulting in Derek being burned alive. A supernatural force suddenly takes over, and Cheryl is dragged into the ring of fire as well.

Allison climbs the staircase, and finds herself fleeing through the settings of the various stories told, followed by Derek's reanimated skeleton, pursuing her with an axe. She is ultimately confronted by Derek, now in the flesh, who holds a revolver to her head before pulling the trigger. Allison suddenly awakens on the morning of her first day of Professor Derek's class; everything that has transpired is a premonitory dream.

== Cast ==
Allison's Story

- Ramy Zada as Professor Edward Derek
- Jillian McWhirter as Allison
- Pamela Segall as Cheryl
- Ed Monaghan as Russ
- Patty Avery as Pat
- Kent Burden as Ron
- Kerry Remsen as Maggie
- Richard Gabai as Dave

The Old Dark House

- Marc McClure as Kevin
- Nadine Van der Velde as Joan

A Night on the Town

- Judie Aronson as Jennifer
- Monique Salcido as Lisa
- Penelope Sudrow as Kelly
- Tracy Wells as Amy
- Luis Contreras as the Dogs' Master

All Night Operator

- Marg Helgenberger as Alex
- Alan Rosenberg as Richard
- Jordana Capra as Vanessa Birch
- Loyda Ramos as Molly
- Billy Ray Sharkey as Ray

== Production ==
Ken and Jim Wheat took inspiration from the 1945 film Dead of Night and decided to make a horror anthology out of a desire to do something that was fully "theirs" as opposed to their collaborative work on films such as The Fly II and A Nightmare on Elm Street 4: The Dream Master. While the studios were hesitant to commit to the duo's film as anthology films with certain exceptions hadn't seen much success theatrically, the duo's success with films such as Silent Scream managed to convince Metro-Goldwyn-Mayer to take on the project.

Paul Chadwick, the production designer, is the artist and originator of the comic Concrete.

== Release ==
=== Box office ===
After Midnight premiered theatrically in the United States on November 3, 1989, opening in 224 theaters. It grossed $59,260 during its opening weekend, and it was a box-office bomb, grossing a total of $76,235.

=== Critical response ===
Eleanor Ringel of The Atlanta Constitution felt the film was "more boring than frightening", comparing it negatively to Dead of Night.

=== Home media ===
On September 20, 2005, MGM released After Midnight on DVD. It was later released on Blu-ray under license from Scream! Factory on September 26, 2017.
