= The Perfect Match (1988 film) =

- Directed by: Mark Deimel
- Screenplay by: Nick Duretta; David A. Burr; Mark Deimel
- Story by: David A. Burr
- Produced by: Mark Deimel; Robert Torrance
- Starring: Marc McClure; Jennifer Edwards; Diane Stilwell; Rob Paulsen; Karen Witter; Jean Byron; Wayne Woodson; Kerry Sherman English
- Cinematography: Robert Torrance
- Edited by: Craig A. Colton
- Music by: Tim Torrance
- Release date: 1988
- Running time: 92 minutes
- Country: United States
- Language: English
- Budget: $875,000

The Perfect Match is a 1988 film directed by a first-time director, Mark Deimel. It is a romantic comedy starring Marc McClure, Jennifer Edwards, Diane Stilwell, Rob Paulsen, Karen Lorre, Jean Byron, Wayne Woodson and Kerry Sherman. The story was by Nick Duretta, David A. Burr and Mark Deimel.

== Plot ==
Tim Wainwright is almost 30 years old. He wants to find a nice girl, so he puts an ad in the LA Reader. He is disappointed by the many unsatisfactory responses. He's just about ready to give up when he gets a reply from Nancy, who seems to be a nice girl. Tim is a man with little ambition. Nancy works a dead end job and takes college classes for fun without intent to graduate. Each exaggerates their job to impress the other: she claims to be a professor; he claims to be an entrepreneur. When the truth reveals itself, they scramble to preserve their relationship.

According to Jonathan Rosenbaum, the film is almost identical to Armyan Bernstein's 1987 film Cross My Heart.

== Background ==
This was Mark Deimel's directorial debut. Having raised $875,000 for the film, he began filming in Southern California on June 3, 1986. A year later, it played at the Seattle Film Festival on June 3, 1987. Its theatrical release was in Southern California on May 27, 1988. On June 3, 1988, it had its release in New York City. It did not do well theatrically and by late June that year, it was released on home video.

== Cast ==
- Marc McClure as Tim Wainwright
- Jennifer Edwards as Nancy Bryant
- Diane Stilwell as Vicki
- Rob Paulsen as John Wainwright
- Karen Lorre as Tammy (credited as Karen Witter)
- Jean Byron as Mom (credited as Jeane Byron)
- Edward Mehler as Wilhauser
- Kerry Sherman as Jeannine (credited as Kerry Sherman English)
- Wayne Woodson as Tim's Boss
