= Retribution (1987 film) =

- Directed by: Guy Magar
- Written by: Guy Magar; Lee Wasserman
- Produced by: Guy Magar
- Starring: Dennis Lipscomb; Leslie Wing; Hoyt Axton; Suzanne Snyder
- Cinematography: Gary Thieltges
- Edited by: Guy Magar; Alan L. Shefland
- Music by: Alan Howarth
- Production companies: Overseas FilmGroup; Taurus Entertainment Company; Renegade; Unicorn
- Distributed by: Taurus Entertainment Company
- Release date: 1987
- Running time: 107 minutes
- Country: United States
- Language: English
- Budget: $1.2 million

Retribution is a 1987 American horror film directed by Guy Magar, written by Magar and Lee Wasserman, and starring Dennis Lipscomb as a suicidal man who is possessed by a vengeful spirit.

== Plot ==
On Halloween, two men both suffer horrific injuries at the same time: George Miller is hospitalized after he attempts suicide by jumping from a hotel roof, and Vito Minelli dies after being shot multiple times and then set on fire when he angers the mob by being unable to pay off his gambling debts. When George is revived and nursed back to health, he begins to have nightmares about Vito's life. His psychiatrist, Dr. Curtis, thinks that he's mentally ill, but Lt. Ashley believes that he's responsible for a series of brutal murders. George eventually discovers that he's been possessed by Vito, who has been killing the gangsters responsible for his own death.

== Cast ==
- Dennis Lipscomb as George Miller
- Leslie Wing as Dr. Jennifer Curtis
- Suzanne Snyder as Angel
- Jeff Pomerantz as Dr. Alan Falconer
- George Murdock as Dr. John Talbot
- Pamela Dunlap as Sally Benson
- Susan Peretz as Mrs. Stoller
- Clare Peck as Carla Minelli
- Chris Caputo as Dylan
- Hoyt Axton as Lieutenant Ashley
- Ralph Manza as Amos
- Mario Roccuzzo as Johnny Blake
- Harry Caesar as Charlie
- Jeffrey Josephson as Joe Martinez
- Tony Cox as Hotel Resident

== Production ==
Guy Magar said it took three years before he found an investor for the film. A wealthy businessman finally put up the entire $1.2 million budget. Filming began in January 1986 and lasted five weeks.

== Release ==
Retribution screened at the AFI Film Festival of Los Angeles in March 1987. The film was originally planned for theatrical release in October 1986, but it was delayed. It had a limited release in June 1987, missed a wide release in October 1987, and was finally scheduled for an October 1988 wide release.

== Reception ==
Chris Willman of the Los Angeles Times called it "stingy on scares" and poorly plotted. Daryl Loomis of DVD Verdict wrote, "Retribution is overlong and kind of silly, but offers some imaginative kills; cult horror fans should get a kick out of it. I recommend it mildly to them, but to nobody else." Empire rated it 3/5 stars and called it "a fun trash movie". Time Out called it "often scary" but too focused on the human interest elements.
