= Dennis Lipscomb =

American actor

- Born: March 1, 1942
- Died: July 30, 2014 (aged 72)
- Education: Clarkson University
- Occupation: Actor
- Years active: 1977–2002
- Spouse: Pat Lipscomb

Dennis Lipscomb (March 1, 1942 – July 30, 2014) was an American actor.

Lipscomb earned an engineering degree from Clarkson University.

Lipscomb's first feature film was Union City (1980). From the early 1980s to the 1990s, Lipscomb appeared in various motion pictures including Love Child (1982), WarGames (1983), Eyes of Fire (1983), The Day After (1983), A Soldier's Story (1984), Crossroads (1986), Amazing Grace and Chuck (1987), Retribution (1987), Sister, Sister (1987), The First Power (1990) and Under Siege (1992). Lipscomb also had a recurring role as mayor of the fictitious town of Sparta, Mississippi in the first season of In the Heat of the Night (1988). Lipscomb guest starred on television commercials and shows, including WKRP In Cincinnati, T.J. Hooker, and Wiseguy (1987; CBS) as Sid Royce/Elvis Prim.

== Filmography ==
Year	Title	Role	Notes
1980	Union City	Harlan	
1982	Penitentiary II	Announcer	
1982	Love Child	Arthur Brady	
1982	Farrell for the People	Jed Carter	TV movie
1983	WarGames	Watson	
1983	Eyes of Fire	Will Smythe	
1983	The Day After	Reverend Walker	TV movie
1984	A Soldier's Story	Captain Taylor	
1985	The Blue Yonder	Finch	TV movie
1986	Crossroads	Lloyd	
1986	Slow Burn	Ron McDonald	TV movie
1987	Guilty of Innocence: The Lenell Geter Story	Lieutenant Hutchison	TV movie
1987	Retribution	George Miller	
1987	Amazing Grace and Chuck	Johnny B. Goode	
1987	Perry Mason: The Case of the Sinister Spirit	Michael Light	TV movie
1987	Sister, Sister	Cleve Doucet	
1989	She Knows Too Much	Ivan Fletcher	TV movie
1989	Prime Target	Officer Rooney	TV movie
1990	The First Power	Commander Perkins	
1990	Anna	Al Lubinski	TV movie
1991	Perry Mason: The Case of the Glass Coffin	Max LeMar	TV movie
1991	Rewrite for Murder	Lieutenant Reiderman	TV movie
1992	Death Ring	Jessup	
1992	Under Siege	Trenton	
1993	Curacao	Henry Rawlings	TV movie
1993	Undercover Blues	Foster	
1993	Nick's Game	Joe Diaco	TV movie
1994	The Force	Sykes	
1994	Without Warning	Dr. Robert Pearlman	TV movie
1995	Automatic	Raymond Hammer	
1995	Lois & Clark: The New Adventures of Superman	Stanley Gables	Season 2 Episode 17 "Resurrection"
1996	Apollo 11	George Low	TV movie
2000	Finding Kelly	Book Collector	
2001	Firetrap	Mr. Reed	
2001	The Medicine Show	Dr. Votkiff	
