= Kerry Sherman =

American actress

Kerry Sherman is an American actress. She played Amy Perkins Wallace on the NBC soap opera Santa Barbara from 1984 to 1986.

== Early life ==
Sherman grew up in Hawaii. Her parents were Ray McDonald, a dancer and actor, and Peggy Ryan. Ray died when she was young. She was not concerned with acting. Later she attended University of Hawaii. She considered a career as a veterinarian, worked as a flight attendant, then later took up acting.

== Career ==
=== 1970s ===
Her earliest role was as Coline, in the "Bionic Boy" episode of The Six Million Dollar Man which aired on November 7, 1976. She played the girlfriend of the Bionic Boy (played by Vincent Van Patten). The following year, she played the part of Patti in the exploitation film, Satan's Cheerleaders. She appeared in Barnaby Jones episode, "Gang War". In 1978, she played the part of Barbara in the Lou Grant episode "Hero". In 1978, she played Kathy Munroe, on The New Adventures of Wonder Woman Season 3, Episode 5 "Disco Devil". In 1979, she played the role of Cathy Ferguson, in Season 3, Episode 1 of How the West Was Won.

=== 1980s ===
In 1982, she was in the hit movie, 48 Hrs.

In 1983, she appeared as Margaret Buchanan in the film, Eyes of Fire.

She created the role of Amy Perkins on the NBC soap opera, Santa Barbara. She played that role from 1984 to 1986.

In 1988, she appeared in The Perfect Match, a romantic comedy about a man and woman pretending to be people they are not.

== Filmography ==
Film
| Title | Role | Director | Year | Notes # |
|---|---|---|---|---|
| Satan's Cheerleaders | Patti | Greydon Clark | 1977 | |
| Son-Rise: A Miracle of Love | Nancy | Glenn Jordan | 1979 | Made for television |
| Mrs. R's Daughter | Cathy Burroughs | Dan Curtis | 1979 | Made for television |
| 1941 | USO Girl | Steven Spielberg | 1979 | |
| The Golden Moment: An Olympic Love Story | | Richard C. Sarafian | 1980 | Made for television |
| Alone at Last | Nancy Elliott | Hy Averback | 1980 | Made for television |
| 48 Hrs. | Rosalie | Walter Hill | 1982 | |
| Eyes of Fire | Margaret Buchanan | Avery Crounse | 1983 | |
| Best Kept Secrets | Joyce | Jerrold Freedman | 1984 | Made for television |
| The Perfect Match | Jeannine | Mark Deimel | 1988 | as Kerry Sherman English |
