= The Five of Me =

1981 American television film

- Genre: Drama
- Based on: The Five of Me: The Autobiography of a Multiple Personality by: Henry Hawksworth; Ted Schwarz
- Teleplay by: Lawrence B. Marcus
- Directed by: Paul Wendkos
- Starring: David Birney; Dee Wallace; Mitchell Ryan; John McLiam; James Whitmore Jr.; Ben Piazza; Judith Chapman; Robert L. Gibson; Herb Armstrong
- Music by: Fred Karlin
- Country of origin: United States
- Original language: English

Production
- Executive producers: John Newland; Alan Jay Factor
- Producer: Jack Farren
- Cinematography: Jack Woolf
- Editor: Dann Cahn
- Running time: 104 minutes
- Production company: The Factor-Newland Production Corporation

Original release
- Network: CBS
- Release: May 12, 1981

The Five of Me is a 1981 American drama television film directed by Paul Wendkos and written by Lawrence B. Marcus. Based on the 1977 autobiography of the same name written by Henry Hawksworth with Ted Schwarz, the film chronicles the true story of Hawksworth's struggles with multiple personality disorder. David Birney stars as Hawksworth, with Dee Wallace, Mitchell Ryan, John McLiam, James Whitmore Jr., Ben Piazza, Judith Chapman, Robert L. Gibson, and Herb Armstrong co-starring. It aired on CBS on May 12, 1981.

== Cast ==
- David Birney as Henry Hawksworth
- Dee Wallace as Ann
- Mitchell Ryan as Dr. Ralph B. Allison
- John McLiam as Henry's Father
- James Whitmore Jr. as Harry
- Ben Piazza as Neurologist
- Judith Chapman as Sally
- Wayne Woodson as Jail Guard
- Robert L. Gibson as Fred
- Herb Armstrong as Bowling Alley Manager

== Plot ==
The story is about Henry Hawksworth, who is in a struggle with four other personalities within him. Henry is shown as a child being threatened by his unbalanced father. The father is threatening to castrate his son. Later Henry returns from South Korea and is a hero for saving a buddy. While he was there, Henry was imprisoned and had developed another personality to cope with things. This personality was Dana. Dana is a family man with conservative values. It is this personality that falls in love with a woman called Ann. Another personality is the violent and sociopathic Johnny. Then there is creative and childish Peter. There is also the protective and unemotional Phil. The Johnny personality commits a crime and goes to court where the multiple personalities of Henry come to light.

== Background ==
The film is based on the true story of Henry Hawksworth, who had dissociative identity disorder. The book on which the film is inspired by, The Five of Me, was written by Hawksworth with Ted Schwarz.

During the filming of this production, an accident occurred on February 21, 1981. Camera assistant Jack Tandberg was killed on the set when he was struck by a driverless stunt car. This is also mentioned in Stuntwomen: The Untold Hollywood Story by Mollie Gregory, which suggests a lack of industry standards may have led to Tandberg's death.
