= Sister, Sister (1987 film) =

1987 film by Bill Condon

- Promotional poster
- Directed by: Bill Condon
- Written by: Bill Condon; Ginny Cerrella; Joel Cohen
- Produced by: Walter Coblenz
- Starring: Eric Stoltz; Jennifer Jason Leigh; Judith Ivey; Dennis Lipscomb
- Cinematography: Stephen M. Katz
- Edited by: Virginia Katz
- Music by: Richard Einhorn
- Production company: Odyssey Film Partners
- Distributed by: New World Pictures
- Release dates: September 11, 1987 (Toronto Film Festival); February 5, 1988 (U.S.)
- Running time: 91 minutes
- Country: United States
- Language: English
- Budget: $4 million
- Box office: $743,445

Sister, Sister is a 1987 American Southern Gothic psychological horror film directed and co-written by Bill Condon in his directorial debut, and starring Eric Stoltz, Jennifer Jason Leigh, and Judith Ivey. It follows two sisters operating an inn in the Louisiana bayou, whose dark secrets come to light after the arrival of a male guest.

== Plot ==
Lucy Bonnard, a young woman with a history of mental illness, helps her older sister, Charlotte, operate the Willows, an inn at their familial plantation in the Louisiana bayou. The sexually frustrated Lucy is unsuccessfully courted by Etienne LeViolette, her childhood friend who now works as a handyman for the sisters. Charlotte is carrying on a romance with town sheriff Cleve Bonnard, but he ends the relationship, blaming Charlotte's overbearing devotion to caring for Lucy.

Late one night, Matt Rutledge, a congressional aide from Washington, D. C., arrives at the inn as a guest, and soon finds himself attracted to Lucy. Three other guests—Mrs. Bettleheim, her daughter, Fran, and son-in-law, Lenny—arrive, and the group share dinner. When a storm causes a power outage, Lucy entertains the guests by telling a ghost story about Jud Nevins, a man who disappeared in the bayou years ago. Lucy claims that other spirits in the area protect her from the malevolent Jud. Etienne, observing Matt's romantic advances toward Lucy, becomes enraged. That night, as Lucy sleeps, an unseen assailant spies on her from a hole in the attic floor, and later lurks downstairs while Mrs. Bettelheim has a snack in the kitchen. In the morning, Charlotte and Lucy find that their beloved dog, Beaux, has been murdered. Lucy becomes hysterical and blames Jud's ghost. Moments later, Etienne appears at the house accusing Charlotte of being Jud's killer. Later that night, when Matt returns to the Willows, Etienne stops him on the road and warns him that Charlotte is dangerous. Meanwhile, Cleve reviews Jud's missing person file at the police station, and finds a photograph of Jud with a young boy who resembles Matt.

Matt returns to the house, but Charlotte forbids him from seeing Lucy, whom she has locked in her bedroom. Lucy manages to smash a window to alert Matt, who rushes upstairs and breaks down her bedroom door. The two have sex in Lucy's bedroom. After, while Lucy takes a bath, she recalls a repressed memory from her childhood: During a Fourth of July party at the Willows, Lucy and Etienne played a game of hide-and-seek in a nearby graveyard. There, Lucy witnessed Charlotte being assaulted by Jud, and attempted to stop it. Jud attacked Lucy, leading Charlotte to stab him to death. Charlotte and Lucy disposed of Jud's corpse in the bayou. When Charlotte sent Lucy back to the graveyard to retrieve Jud's baseball cap, Lucy observed the silhouette of a boy from a distance, whom she assumed was Etienne.

Lucy, rattled by her disturbing memory, sees a man wearing Jud's jacket and baseball cap outside, and runs after him. Shortly after, Etienne is shot with a bow and arrow in the bayou by an unseen assailant. Etienne crawls to the front porch of his shack, where the assailant confronts him, and is revealed to be Matt, Jud's younger brother; the boy Lucy saw in the graveyard the night of Jud's murder was not Etienne, but Matt. Matt flees when he hears Lucy approaching. Lucy arrives at Etienne's shack just as he dies of his wounds.

Lucy returns to the house and is consoled by Matt, unaware that he is Etienne's murderer. Matt implies that Charlotte murdered Etienne. When Charlotte confronts Lucy downstairs, Lucy accuses her of having her institutionalized to keep their secret safe. A confrontation with Matt follows, during which Charlotte explains to Lucy that Matt is manipulating her to avenge his brother's death. Overwhelmed, Lucy flees into the bayou, reaching the spot where they disposed of Jud's body years ago. Matt attempts to drown Lucy in the swamp, but a number of hands emerge from beneath, pulling him under and killing him. A bewildered Lucy watches as a mysterious fog rolls in, and the ghostly figures of several people—among them Etienne—emerge before vanishing.

Some time later, Lucy helps Charlotte prepare for her wedding to Cleve at the Willows. While looking at herself in the mirror, Lucy has a vision of Matt breaking through the glass and attacking her. She is at first terrified, only to realize it was merely a vision.

== Cast ==
- Eric Stoltz as Matt Rutledge
  - Ben Cook as young Matt
- Jennifer Jason Leigh as Lucy Bonnard
  - Ashley McMurray as young Lucy
- Judith Ivey as Charlotte Bonnard
- Dennis Lipscomb as Sheriff Cleve Doucet
- Anne Pitoniak as Mrs. Bettlehelm
- Benjamin Mouton as Etienne LeViolette
- Casey Levron as young Etienne
- Natalia Nogulich as Fran Steuben
- Richard Minchenberg as Lenny Steuben
- Bobby Pickett as Roger
- Jason Saucier as Jud Nevins
- Jerry Leggio as Mr. Bonnard
- Fay Cohn as Mrs. Bonnard
- Bill Condon as Priest

== Production ==
Bill Condon stated his intention with Sister, Sister was to make a Grand Guignol horror piece based on character and atmosphere. Condon and co-writer Joel Cohen wrote the script over the course of 12 weeks.

=== Casting ===
Benjamin Mouton was recommended for the role of Etienne to director Bill Condon by talent agent Bryan Lourd.

=== Filming ===
Principal photography of Sister, Sister began on November 11, 1986 in Louisiana. The interiors were filmed at Madewood Plantation House on Bayou Lafourche, while the exteriors were shot at Greenwood Plantation in St. Francisville. Filming completed on January 30, 1987.

== Release ==
Sister, Sister premiered at the Toronto Film Festival on September 11, 1987. It later opened theatrically in the United States on February 5, 1988.

=== Critical response ===
Kevin Thomas of the Los Angeles Times panned the film as "such a silly and contrived piece of Southern Gothic nonsense that it deserves to end up on the lower half of the bill with that other piece of bayou bilge, Shy People," adding that "Condon, who is also making his feature directorial debut, compounds a lack of originality by taking his material too seriously." Michael Sragow of the San Francisco Examiner compared the film negatively against Hush, Hush, Sweet Charlotte (1964), criticizing the film for having a "hyperbolic tone [that] suggests affectionate parody."

=== Home media ===
On January 16, 2001, Sister, Sister was released on DVD by Anchor Bay Entertainment and again 10 years later by Image Entertainment.

In 2022, the film was released on Blu-ray by Vinegar Syndrome. This edition features a restored 2K restoration of the film from its 35 mm interpositive and extra features including audio commentaries, deleted scenes, cast and crew interviews, and the film's original theatrical trailer.
