= Fred Rexer =

American actor, screenwriter, and soldier (1946–2021)

- Born: Fred Ludwig Rexer Jr. November 30, 1946; Houston, Texas, U.S.
- Died: August 27, 2021 (aged 74); Houston, Texas, U.S.
- Military career
- Allegiance: United States
- Branch: Army
- Service years: 1965–1968
- Units: 5th Special Forces Group; 120th Assault Helicopter Company
- Conflicts: Vietnam War

Fred Ludwig Rexer Jr. (November 30, 1946 - August 27, 2021) was an American writer, technical advisor, and US Army veteran. He was best known as the military advisor on the film Apocalypse Now (1979), and was cited by its screenwriter John Milius as the basis for the protagonist Captain Willard. He also advised on Milius' films Conan the Barbarian (1982) and Red Dawn (1984), and co-wrote with him the story for the film Extreme Prejudice (1987).

== Early life and military career ==
Rexer was born in Houston, Texas on November 30, 1946.

In 1965, dropped out of college in order to enlist in the United States Army in Vietnam. Serving a total of 38 months, he served two tours with the 5th Special Forces Group, and one tour with the 120th Assault Helicopter Company "Razorbacks" as a door gunner. His military commendations included the Silver Star, Distinguished Flying Cross, Bronze Star with Valor and oak leaf cluster, 21 Air Medals, and six Purple Hearts.

== Film career ==
After his discharge, Rexer worked as a federally-licensed machine gun dealer. He wrote several non-fiction books and manuals on firearms and self-defense. He befriended screenwriter John Milius, assisting him on the screenplay for what became Apocalypse Now (1979). Rexer served as the military advisor for the production, and was also named by Milius as the real-life prototype of Captain Willard, the protagonist (played by Martin Sheen).

Rexer then worked with Milius as the "spiritual advisor" for Conan the Barbarian (1982), with Milius naming the villain Rexor (played by Ben Davidson) as a tribute. He further advised on Red Dawn (1984) in which he also makes two cameo appearances - first as a Soviet paratrooper in the opening scene, then as a knife-wielding tank commander gunned down at a service station.

Rexer co-wrote the story for the 1987 film Extreme Prejudice with Milius. The original screenplay was written in the 1970s, though Milius left the project to work on Big Wednesday. The final film was directed by Walter Hill, with the script rewritten by Deric Washburn and Harry Kleiner.

== Personal life and death ==
Rexer died in Houston, aged 74 on August 27, 2021. He was survived by his wife of 49 years, Linda.

== Publications ==
- Fred L. Rexer Jr., Machine Guns: Silencers and Counterinsurgency Weapons, Illustrated Catalogs & Reference Guides Nos. 1, 2, and 3, Houston, TX, 1974
- Fred L. Rexer Jr., Submachine Guns, Calibre 9mm & .45 ACP, Ingram M10 , Houston, TX: Anubis Press, 1977
- Fred L. Rexer Jr., Dead or Alive: A Textbook on Self-Defense with the .45 Automatic, Houston, TX: IDHAC Publishing, 1977
- Fred L. Rexer Jr., Brass Knuckle Bible: A Manual of Concealed Weapons, Shreveport, LA: Delta Press, 1978
- Fred L. Rexer Jr., Bridge City, Shreveport, LA: Delta Press, 1978
- Fred L. Rexer Jr., U.S.A. The Urban Survival Arsenal, Shreveport, LA: Delta Press, 1980
- Richard Dobbins, Evan Slawson, Deric Washburn, and Harry Kleiner (screenplay); John Milius, Fred Rexer (story), Extreme Prejudice, Pocket Books, New York NY, 1987, (ISBN 0-671-64016-X)
