= Stand Alone =

- Directed by: Alan Beattie
- Written by: Roy Carlson
- Produced by: Leon Williams; David C. Thomas
- Starring: Charles Durning; Pam Grier; James Keach
- Cinematography: Tom Richmond; Tim Suhrstedt
- Edited by: Fabien Tordjmann
- Music by: David Campbell
- Distributed by: New World Pictures
- Release date: September 1985
- Running time: 94 minutes
- Country: United States
- Language: English

Stand Alone is a 1985 American action drama film directed by Alan Beattie and starring Charles Durning.

== Plot ==
An older war hero witnesses a murder. He is reluctant to identify the killers. When they come after him, he ends up having to protect his family and himself the only way he knows: fight to survive.

== Cast ==
- Charles Durning as Louis Thibadeau
- Pam Grier as Cathryn Bolan
- James Keach as Detective Isgrow
- Bert Remsen as Paddie
- Barbara Sammeth as Meg
- Lu Leonard as Mrs. Whitehead
- Luis Contreras as Look-Out
- Willard E. Pugh as Macombers
- Bob Tzudiker as Farley
- Mary Ann Smith as Nurse Warren
- Cory 'Bumper' Yothers as Gordie
