= The Glove (film) =

1979 film by Ross Hagen

- VHS cover
- Directed by: Ross Hagen
- Written by: Julian Roffman; Hubert Smith
- Produced by: Julian Roffman
- Starring: John Saxon; Roosevelt Grier; Joanna Cassidy; Joan Blondell; Aldo Ray; Keenan Wynn
- Cinematography: Gary Graver
- Edited by: Robert Fitzgerald
- Music by: Robert O. Ragland
- Distributed by: Troma Entertainment
- Release date: September 21, 1979
- Running time: 90 minutes
- Country: United States
- Language: English

The Glove (also known as The Glove: Lethal Terminator) is a 1979 action film directed by cult actor Ross Hagen and starring John Saxon. Saxon plays a bounty hunter who's given a large sum to track down a vicious ex-convict who has been murdering former prison guards with a large leather-laced steel glove. It was one of several action films Saxon appeared in following Enter the Dragon.

== Plot ==
Sam Kellog (John Saxon) is an ex-cop who works as a modern day bounty hunter in Los Angeles. He works for bailbondsman Bill Schwartz (Keenan Wynn) and is assigned to bring in ex-convicts and criminals who have skipped bail. Kellog is frustrated over the low amount of money he receives from his jobs. Recently divorced, Kellog's ex-wife is threatening to end weekend visitation rights to their young daughter over missing several alimony payments. One day, Kellog is offered a large, off-the-book $20,000 bounty by his former police commander, Lt. Kruger (Howard Honig) to bring in an ex-convict named Victor Hale (Roosevelt Grier) who is suspected in the murders of various former prison guards in the L.A. area. Hale was brutalized in prison by the guards who used a five-pound, leather-covered, steel glove called the 'riot glove' and has been using a copy of it to murder the prison guards who used to beat him with it. Kellog takes the job, aware that the 20 grand reward will solve all of his financial problems. Harry Iverson (Michael Pataki), a bounty hunter from New York City, arrives and offers to team up with Kellog to find Hale, but Kellog refuses, claiming that he works alone.

Over the course of the film, the action switches back and forth between the lives of the protagonist Kellog, who narrates several aspects of his life, as well as the antagonist Hale, who in between murdering the former prison guards, makes a living as a guitarist in a jazz band, and is popular and well liked among the tenants in the low-income housing project where he lives. Hale soon realizes that Kellog is on his tail when he learns that Kellog has been asking questions about Hale's whereabouts. Hale begins stalking Kellog as well as making phone calls to his house to stop trying to find him.

At the climax, Kellog and Hale finally meet face to face when Kellog tracks Hale to the roof of Hale's apartment building where Hale (who annoys Kellog during most of the film by addressing him as "hound dog") offers to make bringing him in a challenge by giving Kellog his riot glove to fight him with. Kellog accepts and a brutal and climatic brawl occurs on the roof of the building where both men batter each other senseless. The fight ends in a stalemate when both of them collapse against a wall, exhausted, and Kellog concedes defeat by removing the riot glove. To show that he does not hold any grudge against him, Hale helps Kellog up and begins to escort him from the building until the bounty hunter, Iverson, suddenly shows up and shoots Hale to death. Iverson tells Kellog that the bounty for Victor Hale was to kill him, not to bring him in alive. The residents of the building, after hearing the gunshots, rush up and literally beat Iverson to death for killing "one of their own", leaving behind the battered and bloodied Kellog on the floor. In a final voice-over, Kellog explains that he nevertheless received the $20,000 bounty for Victor Hale and, having used the money to pay off all of his debts, was able to regain visitation rights to his daughter.

== Cast ==
- John Saxon as Sam Kellog
- Roosevelt Grier (credited as Rosey Grier) as Victor Hale
- Joanna Cassidy as Sheila Michaels
- Joan Blondell as Mrs. Fitzgerald
- Jack Carter as Walter Stratton
- Aldo Ray as Tiny
- Keenan Wynn as Bill Schwartz
- Howard Honig as Lt. Kruger
- Michael Pataki as Harry Iverson
