= Luis Contreras (actor) =

American actor (1950–2004)

- Born: 18 September 1950; San Juan, Puerto Rico
- Died: 20 June 2004 (aged 53); United States
- Occupation: Actor
- Years active: 1970s–2004

Luis Contreras (September 18, 1950 – June 20, 2004) was an American character actor. The son of actor Roberto Contreras, his film debut was in Close Encounters of the Third Kind. Contreras often played the parts of bums, gang members, police officers, prison inmates, and criminals. One of the typical roles that he played as a gang member or criminal was that of Jesus in Walking the Edge.

Contreras appeared in multiple movies for director Walter Hill: The Long Riders, 48 Hrs., Extreme Prejudice, Red Heat, Geronimo: An American Legend, and Last Man Standing.

He died of cancer in 2004 at the age of 53.

== Filmography ==
Year	Title	Role	Notes
1977	Close Encounters of the Third Kind	Federale #2	
1978	Coming Home	Demonstrator	Uncredited
1979	1941	Zoot Suiter	
1979	The Jerk	Extra In 'Cat Juggling' Scene	Uncredited
1980	The Last Married Couple in America	Party Guest #6	
1980	Heart Beat	Mexican Junkie	
1980	The Blues Brothers	Bob's Country Bunker Patron	Uncredited
1980	The Long Riders	Man At The Bar	
1980	Borderline	Bandit	
1982	Barbarosa	Angel	
1982	48 Hrs.	Gang Member	
1984	Repo Man	Mr. Humphries' Security Guard	Uncredited
1985	Walking the Edge	Jesus	
1985	Pee-wee's Big Adventure	Biker #2	
1985	Stand Alone	Look-Out	
1986	Blue City	Lieutenant Ortiz	
1986	Big Trouble	Terrorist #2	
1986	Mission Kill	Officer	
1987	Extreme Prejudice	Lupo	
1987	Straight to Hell	Sal	
1987	Walker	Benito	
1988	Sunset	Jail Inmate #2	
1988	Red Heat	Lupo	
1989	After Midnight	The Dogs' Master	(segment "A Night on the Town")
1990	El Diablo	"Pestoso"	
1991	Suburban Commando	Ringo	
1992	Desert Kickboxer		
1993	Blood In Blood Out	"Realthing"	
1993	Geronimo: An American Legend	Rurale Officer	
1993	Heaven!	Sanchez	
1995	Under the Hula Moon	Bandito	
1996	The Winner	Guy In Couple	
1996	Last Man Standing	Comandante Ramirez	
1997	Down for the Barrio	Cadillac Crowd	
2000	Across the Line	Timex	
2002	Ocean Park	Derelict	
2004	Criminal	Carlos	(final film role)
