= Marc McClure =

American actor (born 1957)

- Born: March 31, 1957 (age 69); San Mateo, California, U.S.
- Occupation: Actor
- Years active: 1975–present
- Spouse: Carol Courson Cowley (m. 1985)
- Children: 1

Marc McClure (born March 31, 1957) is an American actor. He is best known for playing Jimmy Olsen in the Superman series of films released between 1978 and 1987, and Dave McFly in the Back to the Future films.

== Career ==
McClure appeared in the 1976 film Freaky Friday, and later had a cameo in the 2003 remake of the film.

In 1977, McClure portrayed Scott, an employee at Ripples Drive-In, in the Brigham Young University church video The Phone Call. He subsequently appeared in the films I Wanna Hold Your Hand (1978) and Used Cars (1980), both written by Robert Zemeckis and Bob Gale.

McClure is best known for his role as Jimmy Olsen in the 1978 film Superman. He reprised the role in its sequels—Superman II, Superman III, and Superman IV: The Quest for Peace—as well as in the 1984 spinoff film Supergirl. He is the only actor to appear as the same character in all four Christopher Reeve-era Superman films and in Supergirl. In 1985, he also portrayed Jimmy Olsen in a commercial for the Kenner Super Powers Collection action figure line.

In 1985, McClure played Dave McFly, the older brother of Marty McFly, in the film Back to the Future, reuniting him with his I Wanna Hold Your Hand co-star Wendie Jo Sperber and writers Gale and Zemeckis. He reprised the role in Back to the Future Part II (although his only scene was not included in the theatrical version) and Back to the Future Part III.

McClure has made guest appearances on several television series, including Once an Eagle, Happy Days, Hunter, The Shield, and Cold Case.

In 2008, McClure appeared in a guest role as Dax-Ur, a Kryptonian scientist living on Earth, in the seventh-season Smallville episode "Persona", referencing his past role in the Superman films. He also made cameo appearances in the DC Extended Universe films Justice League (2017), as a prison security officer, and in Zack Snyder's Justice League (2021), as a police officer who befriends Lois Lane and is later saved by Cyborg during a battle involving Superman.

== Filmography ==
| Year | Title | Role | Notes |
|---|---|---|---|
| 1976 | Freaky Friday | Boris Harris | |
| 1977 | The Phone Call | Scott | |
| 1978 | Coming Home | High School Class President | |
| 1978 | I Wanna Hold Your Hand | Larry Dubois | |
| 1978 | Superman | Jimmy Olsen | |
| 1980 | Used Cars | Heavy Duty Dubois | |
| 1980 | Superman II | Jimmy Olsen | |
| 1981 | Strange Behavior | Oliver Myerhoff | |
| 1982 | Pandemonium | Randy | |
| 1983 | Superman III | Jimmy Olsen | |
| 1984 | Supergirl | Jimmy Olsen | |
| 1985 | Back to the Future | Dave McFly | |
| 1987 | Superman IV: The Quest for Peace | Jimmy Olsen | |
| 1987 | Amazon Women on the Moon | Ray | segment: "Video Date" |
| 1988 | The Perfect Match | Tim Wainwright | |
| 1989 | Chances Are | Richard | |
| 1989 | After Midnight | Kevin | segment: "The Old Dark House" |
| 1989 | Back to the Future Part II | Dave McFly | Deleted scene |
| 1990 | Back to the Future Part III | Dave McFly | |
| 1990 | Grim Prairie Tales | Tom | Segment: Hit the Trail...to Terror |
| 1992 | The Vagrant | Chuck | |
| 1995 | Sleepstalker | Mr. Davis, Griffin's Father | |
| 1995 | Apollo 13 | Glynn Lunney | |
| 1996 | That Thing You Do! | Hollywood Showcase Director | |
| 1997 | Menno's Mind | Bennett, Medina's Gofer | |
| 1999 | Storm | Dr. Brian Newmeyer | |
| 2000 | Deep Core | Mac | uncredited |
| 2000 | Python | Co-Pilot | |
| 2001 | Venomous | Dr. Dutton | |
| 2002 | Landspeed | Granger | |
| 2003 | Freaky Friday | Boris | |
| 2005 | Coach Carter | Susan's Dad | |
| 2006 | Driftwood | Rich Forrester | |
| 2006 | Superman II: The Richard Donner Cut | Jimmy Olsen | archive footage |
| 2007 | Smallville | Dax-Ur | episode: "Persona" (s7e10) |
| 2008 | Proud American | Sam | |
| 2008 | Frost/Nixon | Network Executive | |
| 2012 | Hercules Saves Christmas | Mr. Rosco | |
| 2012 | Just an American | Sam | |
| 2017 | Powerless | Emily's Father | |
| 2017 | Justice League | Officer Ben Sadowsky | Cameo |
| 2021 | Zack Snyder's Justice League | Officer Jerry | |

| Preceded by Jack Larson | Actors to portray Jimmy Olsen; 1978–1987 | Succeeded by Michael Landes |
