= Mitchell Ryan =

American actor and comedian (1934–2022)

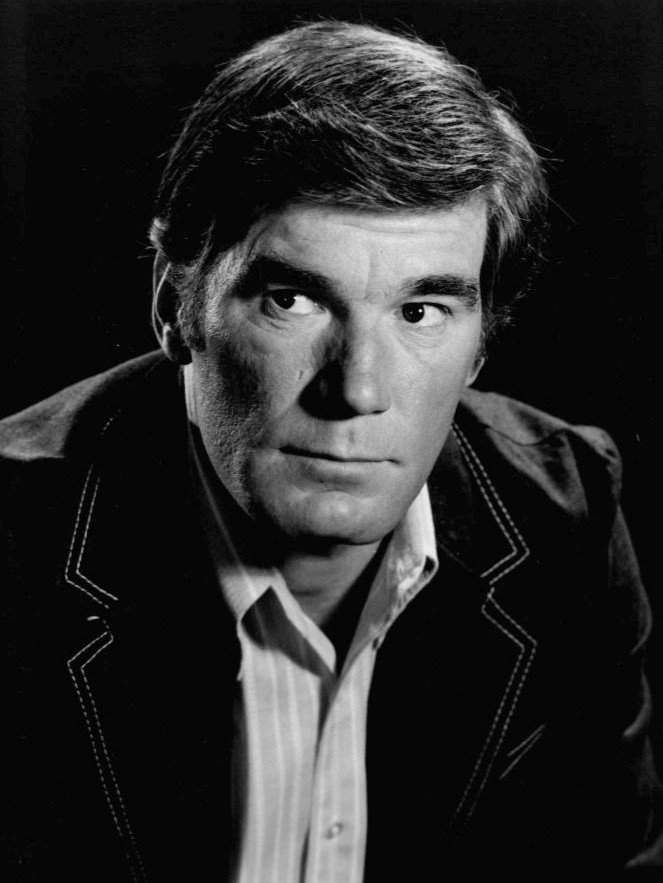
- Mitchell Ryan in 1973
- Born: January 11, 1934; Cincinnati, Ohio, U.S.
- Died: March 4, 2022 (aged 88); Los Angeles, California, U.S.
- Occupations: Actor, comedian
- Years active: 1958–2022
- Spouse: Lynda Morse (m. 1972; div. 1982) Barbara Albertine (m. 1998)
- Children: 3

Mitchell Ryan (January 11, 1934 – March 4, 2022) was an American actor and comedian. With six decades of television credits, he is best known for playing Burke Devlin in the 1960s gothic soap opera Dark Shadows, and later for his co-starring role as Greg Montgomery (Thomas Gibson)'s father Edward Montgomery on Dharma & Greg. He also played the villainous General Peter McAllister in the 1987 buddy cop action film Lethal Weapon.

== Early life ==
Mitchell Ryan was born on January 11, 1934, in Cincinnati, Ohio, and raised in Louisville, Kentucky. His father was a salesman and his mother was a writer. He served in the United States Navy during the Korean War.

== Career ==
A life member of the Actors Studio, Ryan's Broadway theatre credits include Wait Until Dark, Medea, and The Price. His off-Broadway credits include Antony and Cleopatra (1963) and The Price (1979).

Ryan was an original cast member of the cult TV soap opera Dark Shadows, playing Burke Devlin until he was dismissed from the show in June 1967 due to his alcoholism, and replaced by Anthony George.

In 1970, Ryan was in one episode of The High Chaparral as a character named Jelks, who was on the run from the law.

He appeared in an episode of Cannon, "Fool's Gold" in 1971, and in ABC's The Streets of San Francisco episode "The Unicorn". He portrayed the title character, Chase Reddick, on the crime drama Chase (1973–74).

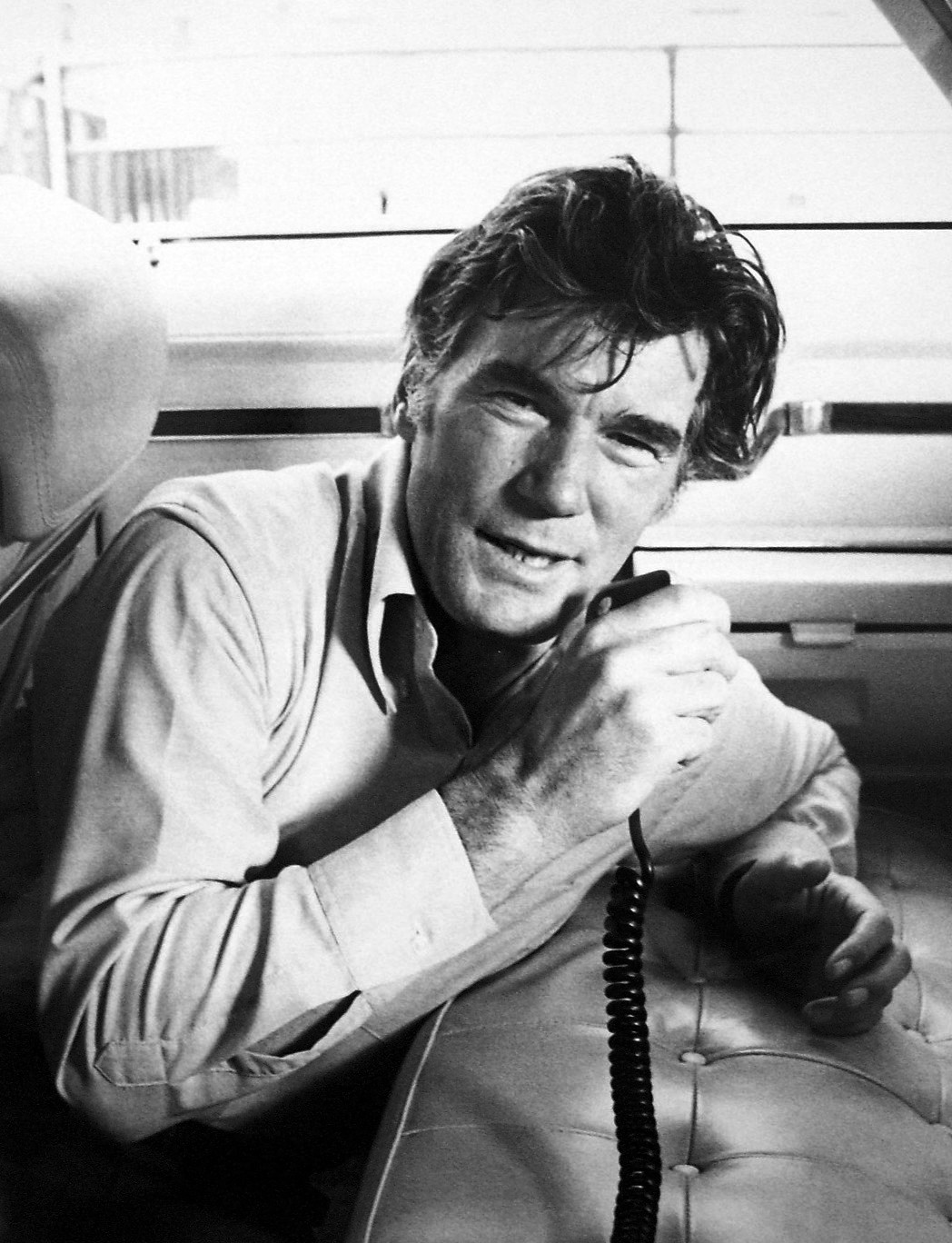
Mitchell Ryan in Chase

In 1975, Ryan played in Barnaby Jones, in the episode titled "Counterfall". He portrayed the leading character, Dan Walling, on Executive Suite (1976–77) and played Blake Simmons in the drama Julie Farr, M.D. (1978–79) which paired him with lead actress Susan Sullivan, whom he reunited with to star together again in Dharma & Greg.

Ryan portrayed Cooper Hawkins on the Western series The Chisholms (1980), Sam Garrett on King's Crossing (1982) Brennan Flannery on High Performance (1983), Edward Wyler on Hot Pursuit (1984), and Porter Tremont on 2000 Malibu Road (1992).

Ryan's other acting credits include the films Liar Liar; Magnum Force, playing as "Dirty Harry" Callahan (Clint Eastwood)'s ill-fated despondent best friend and fellow police officer, a motorcycle patrolman named Charlie McCoy; Lethal Weapon, playing the key villain General Peter McAllister; Grosse Pointe Blank; Electra Glide in Blue; and Hot Shots! Part Deux, playing Senator Grey Edwards. In 1985, he portrayed Tillet Main, the patriarch of the Main family in the first North and South miniseries. In 1991, he played Ellis Blake in the sixth season Matlock episode "The Foursome".

Ryan appeared in NBC's The A-Team; he played Ike Hagan, as Grant Everett in a two-part Silk Stalkings episode; and as Kyle Riker, the father of Commander William Riker (Jonathan Frakes), in the Star Trek: The Next Generation second season episode "The Icarus Factor"; Ryan had been considered for the part of series lead Captain Jean-Luc Picard (Patrick Stewart). He also portrayed the roles of the abusive boyfriend of Blanche Devereaux (Rue McClanahan), Rex Huntington, in The Golden Girls season 6 episode "The Bloom is off the Rose", and Jack Hanlan, a police officer in "Emission Accomplished", a 1993 season 1 episode of NYPD Blue. The same year, Ryan played Dallas Shields in Renegade. He appeared in the 1983 episode of Hart to Hart "Highland Fling". In 1994, he appeared again in Hart to Hart in one of the made-for-TV movies, Home Is Where the Hart Is. In 1995, he appeared in the films Judge Dredd and Halloween: The Curse of Michael Myers as Dr. Terence Wynn (played by Robert Phalen in the original Halloween film).

Ryan played the role of Greg Montgomery (Thomas Gibson)'s father, Edward Montgomery, on the comedy Dharma & Greg (1997–2002). The following year, Ryan voiced Highfather on Justice League.

Ryan was the president of Screen Actors Guild Foundation.

== Personal life and death ==
Ryan married Lynda Morse in 1972, and they had a son. Ryan and Morse divorced in 1982, and Ryan married Barbara Albertine in 1998. They had two children and five grandchildren.

Ryan died of heart failure at his home in Los Angeles, California, on March 4, 2022, at the age of 88.

== Filmography ==
=== Film ===
Year	Title	Role	Notes
1958	Thunder Road	Jed Moultrie	Uncredited
1970	Monte Walsh	Shorty Austin	
1971	My Old Man's Place	Martin Flood	
1971	The Hunting Party	Doc Harrison	
1971	Chandler	Chuck Kincaid	
1972	The Honkers	Lowell	
1972	A Reflection of Fear	Inspector McKenna	
1973	High Plains Drifter	Dave Drake	
1973	The Friends of Eddie Coyle	Waters	
1973	Electra Glide in Blue	Harvey Poole	
1973	Magnum Force	Charlie McCoy	
1976	Midway	Aubrey Fitch	Uncredited
1976	Two-Minute Warning	Priest	
1987	Lethal Weapon	General Peter McCallister	
1989	Winter People	Drury Campbell	
1992	Aces: Iron Eagle III	General Simms	
1992	The Opposite Sex and How to Live with Them	Kenneth Davenport	
1993	Hot Shots! Part Deux	Gray Edwards	
1994	Blue Sky	Ray Stevens	
1994	Speechless	Lloyd Wannamaker	
1995	Judge Dredd	Vartis Hammond	
1995	Halloween: The Curse of Michael Myers	Dr. Terrence Wynn	
1996	Ed	Abe Woods	
1997	The Devil's Own	Jim Kelly	
1997	Liar Liar	Mr. Allan	
1997	Grosse Pointe Blank	Bart Newberry	
2005	Love for Rent	Doctor	Uncredited

=== Television ===
Year	Title	Role	Notes
1959	Brenner	Detective Mack	Episode: "Record of Arrest"
1961	'Way Out	Bill Fontaine	Episode: "Soft Focus"
1961–1963	Naked City	Various	5 episodes
1961–1965	The Defenders	Harry Cook/Jack Bostick	2 episodes
1966–1967	Dark Shadows	Burke Devlin	107 episodes
1967	Coronet Blue	Oscar Davis	Episode: "Faces"
1967–1969	N.Y.P.D.	Joseph Robert Maloney/Mr. Whitaker	2 episodes
1970	The High Chaparral	Jelks	Episode: "Jelks"
1971	O'Hara, U.S. Treasury	Brad Fletcher	Episode: "Operation: Pay Off"
1971–1975	Cannon	Alexander Roper/John Flatow/Ed Farrell	3 episodes
1973	The Fuzz Brothers	Ben	Television film
1973	The Streets of San Francisco	Abel Hoffman	Episode: "The Unicorn"
1973–1974	Chase	Captain Chase Reddick	23 episodes
1974	The Manhunter	Tom Bailey	Episode: "The Man Who Thought He Was Dillinger"
1974	Kodiak	Prisoner	Episode: "Thunder Mountain"
1975	Barnaby Jones	Dennis Kelly	Episode: "Counterfall"
1975	The Rockford Files	Colonel Hopkins	Episode: "2 Into 5.56 Won't Go"
1975	The Entertainer	Mr. Pasko	Television film
1975	Baretta	Bax Baxter	Episode: "Nobody in a Nothing Place"
1976	The Blue Knight	Peter Stryker	Episode: "Cop Killer"
1976	The Hemingway Play	Ernest Hemingway	Television film
1976–1977	Executive Suite	Dan Walling	18 episodes
1977	Most Wanted	Keith Garner	Episode: "The Spellbinder"
1977	Escape from Bogen County	Ambler Bowman	Television film
1977	Peter Lundy and the Medicine Hat Stallion	Jethro Lundy	Television film
1977	Christmas Miracle in Caufield, U.S.A.	Matthew Sullivan	Television film
1978	Having Babies III	Dr. Blake Simmons	Television film
1978	Sergeant Matlovich vs. the U.S. Air Force	Lieutenant Colonel Applegate	Television film
1978	Family	Mike Dunston	Episode: "Expectations"
1978–1979	Julie Farr, M.D.	Dr. Blake Simmons	8 episodes
1979	Flesh & Blood	Jack Fallon	Television film
1980	The Chisholms	Cooper Hawkins	9 episodes
1980	Angel City	Silas Creedy	Television film
1981	The Choice	Jerry Clements	Television film
1981	The Monkey Mission	Keyes	Television film
1981	The Five of Me	Dr. Ralph B. Allison	Television film
1981	Death of a Centerfold	Hugh Hefner	Television film
1981	Of Mice and Men	Slim	Television film
1982	King's Crossing	Sean Garrett	Episode: "Long Ago Tomorrow"
1983	Uncommon Valor	Chief Tom Riordan	Television film
1983	High Performance	Brennan Flannery	2 episodes
1983	Medea	Jason	Television film
1983	The Gambler: The Adventure Continues	Charlie McCourt	Television film
1983	Hart to Hart	Ramsey MacLeish	Episode: "Highland Fling"
1984	Hardcastle and McCormick	Sheriff Stretch Carter	2 episodes
1985	Hotel	Steve Cutler	Episode: "Lifelines"
1985	Dallas	Captain Merwin Fogarty	3 episodes
1985	Hot Pursuit	Mr. Wyler	2 episodes
1985	Fatal Vision	Paul Strombaugh	Episode: "1.2"
1985	Robert Kennedy and His Times	Robert McNamara	Episode: "1.1"
1985	Riptide	Colonel John Litvak	Episode: "Boz Busters"
1985	The A-Team	Ike Hagen	Episode: "Waste 'Em!"
1985	North and South	Tillet Main	6 episodes
1985	Hostage Flight	Captain Malone	Television film
1985	Hell Town	Howard Bane	Episode: "My Girlfriend, Annie"
1985	Northstar	Colonel Even Marshall	Television film
1985–1995	Murder, She Wrote	Various	4 episodes
1986	All My Children	Alex Hunter	Episode: "1.4186"
1986	Penalty Phase	Donald Faulkner	Television film
1987	St. Elsewhere	George Deaton	Episode: "Rites of Passage"
1988	The English Programme	Slim	5 episodes
1988	Favorite Son	Vice President Dan Eastman	Episode: "Part One"
1989	The Ryan White Story	Tom	Television film
1989	Star Trek: The Next Generation	Kyle Riker	Episode: "The Icarus Factor"
1989	Double Exposure: The Story of Margaret Bourke-White	General George S. Patton	Television film
1989	Mission: Impossible	Edgar Sheppard	Episode: "Submarine"
1989	Santa Barbara	Anthony Tonell	36 episodes
1989	Hardball	Captain Jake Griffin	Episode: "The Fighting 52nd"
1989–1990	Jake and the Fatman	Lieutenant Dan Gorecki/Ethan Mitchell	2 episodes
1990	Who's the Boss?	Jack	Episode: "Did You Ever Have to Make Up Your Mind?"
1990	Judgment	Dave Davis	Television film
1990	L.A. Law	Duncan Young	Episode: "Smoke Gets In Your Thighs"
1991	The Golden Girls	Rex Huntington	Episode: "The Bloom is Off the Rose"
1991	Hunter	Tom Reed	Episode: "Shadows of the Past"
1991	Deadly Game	Admiral Mark Nately	Television film
1991	In a Child's Name	Peter Chappell	2 episodes
1991	Matlock	Ellis Blake	Episode: "The Foursome"
1992	Civil Wars	Judge Kosarin	Episode: "Denise and De Nuptials"
1992	Mann & Machine	Bennet Tyler	Episode: "Water, Water, Everywhere"
1992	The Young Riders	Marshall Luke Murphy	Episode: "Lessons Learned"
1992	Dirty Work	Frank Esposito	Television film
1992	2000 Malibu Road	Porter Tremont	4 episodes
1992	Majority Rule	John Wade	Television film
1993	Reasonable Doubts	Hugh Mandrake	Episode: "Wish You Were Here"
1993	Star	Harrison Barclay	Television film
1993	NYPD Blue	Jack Hanlan	Episode: "Emission Accomplished"
1993	General Hospital	Frank Smith	2 episodes
1993–1994	Renegade	Dallas Bronson/Ted Shields	4 episodes
1994	Hart to Hart: Home is Where the Hart Is	Chief Carson	Television film
1994	Walker, Texas Ranger	Judge Riley	Episode: "The Committee"
1994	One West Waikiki	Cosmetic Surgeon	Episode: "'Til Death Do Us Part"
1995	Gramps	Oliver	Television film
1995	The Single Guy	Mr. Brimley	2 episodes
1995	Silk Stalkings	Grant Everett	2 episodes
1996	A Face to Die For	Joe Thomas	Television film
1996	Raven Hawk	White	Television film
1996	Champs	Mr. Shuester	Episode: "We'll Never Have Paris"
1996	Wings	Jonathan Clayton	3 episodes
1997	Dark Skies	William Paley	Episode: "To Prey in Darkness"
1997	Spy Game	Morganthal	Episode: "What, Micah Worry?"
1997	The Practice	Judge George Nelson	Episode: "The Civil Right"
1997–2002	Dharma & Greg	Edward Montgomery	119 episodes
1998	Life of the Party: The Pamela Harriman Story	W. Averell Harriman	Television film
1999	Aftershock: Earthquake in New York	Frank Agostini	2 episodes
2003	Justice League	Highfather (voice)	Episode: "Twilight"
2004	The West Wing	Senator Roland Pierce	Episode: "The Supremes"
2004	The Drew Carey Show	Woody	Episode: "Drew Hunts Silver Fox"
2021	Smartphone Theatre	Harry	Episode: "What Friends Do (#Expendables)"
