= 48 Hrs. =

1982 film directed by Walter Hill

- Theatrical release poster
- Directed by: Walter Hill
- Written by: Roger Spottiswoode; Walter Hill; Larry Gross; Steven E. de Souza
- Produced by: Lawrence Gordon; Joel Silver
- Starring: Nick Nolte; Eddie Murphy; Annette O'Toole
- Cinematography: Ric Waite
- Edited by: Freeman A. Davies; Mark Warner; Billy Weber
- Music by: James Horner
- Production company: Lawrence Gordon Productions
- Distributed by: Paramount Pictures
- Release date: December 8, 1982 (United States)
- Running time: 97 minutes
- Country: United States
- Language: English
- Budget: $12 million
- Box office: $78.9 million

48 Hrs. (pronounced Forty-Eight Hours) is a 1982 American buddy cop action comedy film starring Nick Nolte and Eddie Murphy (the latter in his film debut) as a cop and a convict, respectively, who team up to catch two hardened criminals. Directed by Walter Hill, from a screenplay co-written with Larry Gross, Steven E. de Souza and Roger Spottiswoode, and titled after the amount of time the duo has to solve the crime, 48 Hrs. marked Joel Silver's debut as a producer.

Though predated by Richard Rush's 1974 film Freebie and the Bean, the film is often credited as being the first in the "buddy cop" genre, later popularized by films such as Lethal Weapon, Bad Boys, and Rush Hour. Its supporting cast features Annette O'Toole, James Remar, Frank McRae, David Patrick Kelly, Sonny Landham, Jonathan Banks and Brion James. The musical score was composed by James Horner.

Released by Paramount Pictures on December 8, 1982, 48 Hrs. was one of the most commercially successful films of 1982, received widespread acclaim from critics, and launched Murphy's film career by earning him a Golden Globe Award nomination for New Star of the Year – Actor. A sequel, Another 48 Hrs., was released in 1990, also directed by Walter Hill, with Nolte and Murphy reprising their roles.

== Plot ==
Murderer and robber Albert Ganz escapes from prison with the help of a member of his gang, Billy Bear. The criminals travel to San Francisco to recover money from Ganz's last robbery. Searching for the cash, they kill Henry Wong, a former member of the gang, then assault another former member, Luther Kelly. Luther admits that he knows where the money is but cannot retrieve it for a couple of days. Ganz and Billy kidnap Luther's girlfriend Rosalie as collateral.

Ganz and Billy use a stolen credit card for a hotel room, alerting the SFPD. Inspector Jack Cates joins Inspectors Algren and Van Zant at the hotel to investigate. Believing they are simply investigating a stolen card, the three officers are unaware of the danger. Ganz and Billy ambush and kill Algren and Van Zant, escaping with Jack's service revolver.

Wanting to avenge Algren and Van Zant, Jack visits another former member of Ganz's gang, Reggie Hammond, currently imprisoned for armed robbery with six months left in his sentence. Reggie becomes concerned when he learns that Ganz is loose and tells Jack he can assist him in tracking down Ganz if Jack gets him out of prison. Jack illegally forges a 48-hour release to put Reggie in his custody. Reggie brings Jack to Luther's apartment, where the duo captures him as he tries to flee. Luther refuses to admit he has seen Ganz. Jack becomes suspicious that Reggie is concealing something.

That night, Reggie leads Jack to a redneck hangout where Billy worked as a bartender. The duo gets a lead on Billy's girlfriend Casey, who lives in Chinatown with Ganz's girlfriend Sally. Jack and Reggie visit the apartment, but the women deny having seen the fugitives. Tensions between Reggie and Jack finally erupt into a fistfight that is broken up by a pair of patrol officers. Reggie admits to Jack that three years earlier, he, Ganz, Billy, Luther, and Henry robbed a drug dealer of $500,000; the money is stashed in the trunk of Reggie's Porsche in a downtown parking garage.

Hoping to rescue his girlfriend, Luther retrieves Reggie's car from the garage when it opens the next day, unaware that Reggie and Jack are staking out the location. They tail him to a Muni station where Ganz and Billy are waiting for the money. When Ganz notices Jack, a shootout occurs, with Ganz and Billy escaping after Billy kills a cop. Reggie chases after Luther, leaving Jack behind. Left with nothing, Jack returns to the police station. However, Reggie calls him from a nightclub in the Fillmore District. Jack joins Reggie there and learns that Reggie has tracked Luther to a hotel across the street. Jack, humbled, apologizes for continuously berating and insulting Reggie.

Jack lends Reggie some money to pay for a room at the hotel so he can have sex with a woman he met, but before Reggie can proceed they see Luther leave the hotel. Luther boards a stolen bus driven by Billy and hands over the money to Ganz, who promptly kills him. Ganz notices Jack and Reggie tailing them and a car chase/gunfight ensues, ending when Billy forces Jack's Cadillac DeVille Convertible to crash. Back at the police station, Captain Haden berates Jack for his failure, and Jack defends Reggie from Haden's wrath.

Before returning Reggie to prison, Jack takes him to a local bar. As they talk, Jack and Reggie hypothesize that Billy and Ganz might return to their girlfriends. Forcing their way inside Casey's residence, they find the fugitives. Reggie shoots and kills Billy after he ignores Reggie's warning to surrender. Ganz escapes into a maze of alleyways with the money. Jack and Reggie follow him, but Ganz captures Reggie. Jack shoots Ganz in the shoulder, freeing Reggie. Ganz, furious and incredulous to have been shot, charges at Jack, who guns him down.

Later, Jack puts the money into the trunk of Reggie's car, but requests a loan for a new car, to which Reggie agrees. While driving back to the prison, Jack sternly warns Reggie that he should completely reform once released, or he will be reincarcerated. Reggie agrees, while jokingly attempting to steal Jack's lighter.

== Cast ==
- Nick Nolte as San Francisco Police Inspector Jack Cates
- Eddie Murphy as Reggie Hammond
- Annette O'Toole as Elaine Marshall
- Frank McRae as Captain Haden
- James Remar as Albert Ganz
- David Patrick Kelly as Luther Kelly
- Sonny Landham as Billy Bear
- Brion James as Inspector Ben Kehoe
- Kerry Sherman as Rosalie
- Jonathan Banks as Inspector Algren
- James Keane as Inspector Van Zant
- Tara King as Frizzy
- Greta Blackburn as Lisa
- Margot Rose as Casey
- Denise Crosby as Sally
- Olivia Brown as Candy
- Jack Thibeau as Inspector Lloyd
- Clare Nono as Ruth
- Sandy Martin as Officer Kramer
- Chris Mulkey as Officer Bellis
- John Hauk as Henry Wong
- Peter Jason as Torchy's Bartender
- John Dennis Johnston as Torchy's Patron
- Ola Ray as Vroman’s Dancer

== Production ==
=== Development and writing ===
Lawrence Gordon came up with the original idea for the film. The premise had the Governor of Louisiana's daughter kidnapped by a criminal, who strapped dynamite to her head and threatened to blow her up in 48 hours if the ransom was not met. The meanest cop goes to the worst prison in the state and gets out the most vicious criminal for his knowledge of the kidnapper who was his cellmate. Walter Hill says Gordon may have had the idea as far back as 1971 and a few writers worked on the project. In 1975 Gordon was making Hard Times with writer-director Walter Hill and editor Roger Spottiswoode. Spottiswoode wanted to direct and Hill suggested he break in by writing a script. He did a draft of 48 Hours supervised by Hill for Columbia Pictures, who had financed 48 Hours. Later Tracy Keenan Wynn worked on the script.

The film moved from Columbia to Paramount, which wanted to do a draft for Clint Eastwood. They hired Hill to rewrite the script with Eastwood as the criminal. He did so "but when I turned it in I said that I didn't think it would work," Hill said, adding "that the best idea would be to make Richard Pryor the criminal and have someone like Eastwood play the cop. Back in '78 or '79, no one seemed to think this was such a good idea." Eastwood ended up playing a criminal in Escape from Alcatraz instead. As a result, 48 Hrs. went into limbo for two years. However, Gordon and his co-producer Joel Silver did not forget the project. Gordon called Hill and asked him if he would make the film with Nick Nolte as Cates. "Paramount felt that the combination of Nick Nolte and a good black actor would be commercial," said Hill. "What happened is very simple: Richard Pryor is now an enormous movie star, and that's changed everybody's mind about black lead players."

From the start, Hill envisioned a more improvisational film than he'd ever before created. "The story is a traditional urban thriller: two terrible guys are out there and have to be brought down," he said. "But even though I enjoy working in genres, the point is always to explode them or give them a transfusion. So I made a very conscious decision to go with the elements of personality of the two players, rather than be overly genuflective to the narrative. Thrusting a white policeman and a black convict together carries so much gravity that we didn't have to beat the white-black thing to death. If it works, it's because of the actors' personalities." Hill's first choice after Richard Pryor was Gregory Hines. When he was not available, Hill's then-girlfriend Hildy Gottlieb recommended her client, Eddie Murphy, then best known for his work on Saturday Night Live. The character of Reggie Hammond was originally named Willie Biggs, but Eddie Murphy felt that was too stereotypical of a black man's name and changed it to Reggie Hammond.

Steven E. de Souza worked on the script for a few weeks after Eddie Murphy was cast. Critic Michael Sragow says "The producers recommended de Souza to Hill because they thought he'd be good at adding a light touch to the action. Hill didn't find de Souza fast enough or his style of comic writing appropriate to the movie; he thought the writer contributed gags instead of personality touches (very few of which were used), and he just didn't develop the rapport with de Souza that he'd later have with Gross." Hill brought on Larry Gross to work on the script three weeks before shooting. He told Gross, "I've been working this fella and while I like em I know it's not gonna work out...." and called the film "a shaggy dog story. Defiant Ones plus chuckles."

Sragow said, "Hill has been known throughout his career for defining character through action rather than psychological banter, but he knew that this movie would be more of a character piece than a plot picture, and he wanted a writer who'd challenge his own habits and assumptions. Throughout filming, Hill joked that he waved the flag called 'myth and archetype'—trying to play off the folkloric expectations an audience might have for a big blonde hero like Nick Nolte-while Larry Gross waved a flag called 'social and psychological realism.' The writers' relationship became so symbiotic that Gross often found Hill coming down on the side of S&PR and Gross defending the prerogatives of M&A."

Gross says his main contributions were: The idea that Reggie Hammond wanted badly to have sex after three years in prison; Nick Nolte having a relationship with his girlfriend that mirrored the frustration Eddie was having; improving "the nuances of the relationships between Nick and his girl, his boss and the killers. The killers were sharpened up and made more interesting... Whenever Walter could invent a monologue for one of the women (all bit parts), he would." Gross thought Hill had received "a bum rap on the woman question." "One of the things I think makes 48 HRS. really more interesting than the average kind of movie like this," said its co-writer, "is that, although women play relatively small roles in the narrative, they kind of haunt everyone's imagination. The film really is sort of a screwball comedy about men and women trying to get together and not getting together, even though it is a very conventional gangster piece." "People had this perception of Walter being melancholy," Gross said. "And now that he's made this film no one thinks he's melancholy anymore."

=== Filming ===
Filming started on May 17, 1982, and ended on August 18, 1982. The film was shot on-location in San Francisco and Los Angeles.

Murphy started a few weeks after principal photography began, as he was finishing up a season of Saturday Night Live. The shoot went well, but Hill ran into problems with studio executives. Michael Eisner, then head of Paramount, was worried that the film was not funny enough. Hill and his co-screenwriter, Larry Gross wrote more material tailored to Nolte's and Murphy's personalities. By Hill's account, they rewrote Murphy's character right to the very last day of shooting. Executives also found the footage of the gunfight in the hotel to be too violent, and were worried that it would kill the film's humor. They told Hill that he would never work for Paramount again as a result. Actor Chris Mulkey said it was widely known on set that Paramount executives hated what they had seen of Murphy's performance in dailies and wanted to fire him, but Nolte and Hill fought to keep him. Mulkey remembered Murphy as a diligent performer who was open to suggestions and stuck to the script.

In 2008, co-writer Larry Gross's contemporaneous diary of his days on set was published on the MovieCityNews website.

== Music ==
In January 2011, Intrada Records released the world-premiere recording of James Horner's score and songs from the movie in a limited-edition run of 5,000 units. This was the first official release of the score; previous pressings from Europe were unofficial bootlegs with music from other James Horner film scores.

No.	Title	Artist	Length
1.	"Main Titles"	James Horner	5:13
2.	"Jack Leaves Elaine's Apartment"	James Horner	1:10
3.	"The Walden Hotel"	James Horner	4:14
4.	"Aerobics"	James Horner	4:12
5.	"Subway Station"	James Horner	5:43
6.	"Subway Chase"	James Horner	1:54
7.	"Luther's Blues"	James Horner	2:00
8.	"The Alley"	James Horner	5:23
9.	"The Boys Are Back in Town"	The BusBoys	2:40
10.	"48 Hrs."	The BusBoys	3:16
11.	"Love Songs Are for Crazies"	The BusBoys	3:48
12.	"New Shoes"	The BusBoys	3:34
13.	"Torchy's Boogie"	Ira Newborn	3:00

== Reception ==
=== Box office ===
48 Hrs. opened in the United States on Wednesday, December 8, 1982, with its first weekend the same as The Toy and Airplane II: The Sequel and finished behind them in third place for the weekend with a gross of $4,369,868 from 850 screens, and had a gross of $5,273,192 from its first 5 days. The film grossed $78,868,508 overall at the U.S. and Canada box office, surpassing their combined box-office, to become the seventh highest-grossing film of 1982.

=== Critical response ===
48 Hrs. received critical acclaim and is considered by many as one of the best films of 1982. On Rotten Tomatoes, the film has a 92% approval rating, based on 52 reviews, with an average rating of 7.5/10. The site's critical consensus reads, "Marking an auspicious feature film debut for Eddie Murphy, 48 Hrs. is a briskly paced action comedy that succeeds largely due to the outstanding chemistry between its two leads". On Metacritic, the film has a score of 71 out of 100, based on 8 critics, indicating "generally favorable" reviews. In 2007, the staff at IGN named the movie the third-greatest buddy cop film.

=== Accolades ===
Award	Year	Category	Nominee	Result
Edgar Award	1983	Best Motion Picture Screenplay	Walter Hill, Roger Spottiswoode, Larry Gross, Steven E. de Souza	Nominated
Festival du Film Policier de Cognac	1983	Grand Prix	Walter Hill	Won
Golden Globe Award	1983	New Star of the Year – Actor	Eddie Murphy	Nominated
Los Angeles Film Critics Association	1982	Best Music	James Horner, The BusBoys (Gus Loundermon, Brian O'Neal, Kevin O'Neal)	Won

== Franchise ==
=== Sequel ===
A sequel, Another 48 Hrs., was released in 1990. Walter Hill returned to direct, and Nolte, Murphy, James, and McRae all reprised their roles. The film was a box office success but received negative reviews.

=== Remake ===
A Hindi-language Indian remake, Andar Baahar, was released in 1984, with Jackie Shroff and Anil Kapoor in the lead roles. A Kannada-language unofficial remake, Police File, was released in 1992.

In 2017, the Safdie brothers announced they would helm a remake and co-write the script with Jerrod Carmichael. In December 2019, the Safdies stated they reworked their script into a separate original idea. As of 2025, the film has not been produced.
