= To Hell You Ride =

American comic book series

Publication information
- Publisher: Mike Richardson; Dark Horse Comics
- Format: FC, 32 pages
- Genre: Horror
- Publication date: December 2012 – July 2013
- No. of issues: 5
- Main character(s): Seven George aka Two-Dogs; Sheriff Jim Shipps

Creative team
- Created by: Lance Henriksen
- Written by: Lance Henriksen; Joseph Maddrey
- Artist: Tom Mandrake
- Letterer: Nate Piekos of Blambot
- Colourist: Cris Peter
- Editor: Scott Allie

To Hell You Ride is a 5 issues comic-book series written by Lance Henriksen (Millennium (TV series), Aliens (franchise), Near Dark) and Joseph Maddrey (Nightmares in Red, White and Blue), with art by Tom Mandrake, published by Dark Horse Comics, 2012–2013. To Hell You Ride is a horror story that takes place in a mountain town of Colorado.

== Publication history ==
=== From the original idea to the comic book ===
As stated by Henriksen in interviews, a trip to the town of Telluride, Colorado, in the 70's, has strongly impressed him. He transposed his emotions into the creation of a screenplay. The material was lost over time, but Henriksen eventually revived his ideas following a handshake deal with the Dark Horse publisher. Henriksen also quotes the final lines of the poem Should Lanterns Shine by Dylan Thomas, as an additional inspiration:

I have heard many years of telling,
And many years should see some change.

The ball I threw while playing in the park
Has not yet reached the ground.

[emphasis added]

Henriksen and Maddrey, who have already worked together on previous film and publishing projects, co-opted Mandrake to complete their team.

- Title

Simultaneously informative and symbolic, the title recalls a supposed etymology of the Telluride toponym.

=== Issues ===
Issue	Title	Published on
1	White Man's Guilt	12.12.12
2	The Alchemy of Snow	January 9, 2013
3	Metamorphosis	February 13, 2013
4	Ghost Dance	May 15, 2013
5	Death Song	July 17, 2013

=== Promotional Animated Video ===
An animated video was produced by Dark Horse Comics to promote the release of the first issue of To Hell You Ride. The video featured a script written by Lance Henriksen and Joseph Maddrey, narration by Lance Henriksen, the artwork of Tom Mandrake in animated form and a musical score by the group TKU: Tecamachalco Underground (Cesar Gallegos/Mateo Latosa). It was posted on YouTube on October 3, 2012.

== Genre ==
According to the main formal traits of the story, the publisher widely classifies this series as horror genre.

The narrated story is more elaborated than in a regular comic. It is rather a literary fiction of magic realism genre, condensed and wrapped in the shape of a comics miniseries. Expressed with the artistic means of supernatural horror style, the content of the work is, in essence, a moral tale. By typology, the storyline goes towards an epic quest for identity and existence meaning, a journey that the hero is channeled to make, by a converged set of events. Native American culture and life are the source for the hero definition and for the supernatural features of the telling.

== Structure ==
The story unfolds with exponentially increasing intensity along five (3 + 2 monthly) issues.

- First three issues:

Each one of the first three books is displaying a similar scheme of zigzag movement through time, between present-day and several past episodes. The narrative flows across a complex structure of temporal layers pinned together by the geographic and ethnic (genealogical and mythological) constant element. The magic realism setting makes everything to be double sided. The past events contain both historical accurate and fictional facts (including an invented side of the Native American mythology), while the present-day episodes picture the actual crisis moments of a contemporary well-known society and the surreal plane with its dual subcomponents: horror and mystical.

Using the premise of a non-linear time, the authors are interlacing the historical facts and the present action into a causality perpetuum-mobile and gradually deliver to the reader a tool-set to decrypt their message.

== Synopsis ==
- Premise
- Plot
- 1. White Man's Guilt
- 2. The Alchemy of Snow
- 3. Metamorphosis
- 4. Ghost Dance
- 5. Death Song

== Characters ==
- Seven George
- Sheriff Jim Shipps
- The Watchers
