= Joseph Maddrey =

American screenwriter

- Born: 1979 (age 46–47)
- Occupations: Author, screenwriter

Joseph Maddrey (born 1979) is an American author and screenwriter known for writing and producing the documentary Nightmares in Red, White and Blue: The Evolution of the American Horror Film. He worked as a co-author with Lance Henriksen on Henriksen's autobiography, Not Bad for a Human - The Life and Films of Lance Henriksen, and also co-wrote the comic book series To Hell You Ride with Henriksen as well.

== Bibliography ==
=== Books ===
- Nightmares in Red, White and Blue: The Evolution of the American Horror Film (McFarland; 2004)
- The Making of T.S. Eliot: A Study of the Literary Influences (McFarland; 2009)
- Not Bad for a Human: The Life and Films of Lance Henriksen, co-written with Lance Henriksen (Alexander Henriksen Publishers; 2011)
- To Hell You Ride" graphic novel, co-written with Lance Henriksen and Tom Mandrake (Dark Horse Comics; 2013)
- Beyond Fear: Reflections on Stephen King, Wes Craven, and George Romero's Living Dead (BearManor; 2014)
- A Strange Idea of Entertainment: Conversations with Tom McLoughlin (BearManor; 2014)
- The Quick, The Dead and The Revived: The Many Lives of the Western Film (McFarland; 2016)
- Simply Eliot (part of the Great Lives series) (Simply Charly; 2018)
- Out the House (Powys Media; private edition, 2018, mass market edition,2020)
- Brainstorm (Constellation; 2020)
- The Soul of Wes Craven (Harker Press; 2024)
