= American Graffiti =

1973 film by George Lucas

- Theatrical release poster by Mort Drucker
- Directed by: George Lucas
- Written by: George Lucas; Gloria Katz; Willard Huyck
- Produced by: Francis Ford Coppola; Gary Kurtz
- Starring: Richard Dreyfuss; Ron Howard; Paul Le Mat; Charles Martin Smith; Candy Clark; Mackenzie Phillips; Cindy Williams; Wolfman Jack
- Cinematography: Ron Eveslage; Jan D'Alquen; Haskell Wexler
- Edited by: Verna Fields; Marcia Lucas
- Production companies: Lucasfilm Ltd.; The Coppola Company
- Distributed by: Universal Pictures
- Release dates: August 2, 1973 (Locarno); August 11, 1973 (United States)
- Running time: 112 minutes
- Country: United States
- Language: English
- Budget: $777,000
- Box office: $140 million

American Graffiti is a 1973 American comedy-drama film directed by George Lucas, produced by Francis Ford Coppola and Gary Kurtz, written by Lucas, Gloria Katz, and Willard Huyck, and starring Richard Dreyfuss, Ron Howard, Paul Le Mat, Charles Martin Smith, Candy Clark, Mackenzie Phillips, Cindy Williams, and Wolfman Jack. Harrison Ford and Bo Hopkins also appear. Set in Modesto, California, in 1962, the film is a study of the cruising and early rock and roll cultures popular among Lucas' age group at that time. Through a series of vignettes, it tells the story of a group of teenagers and their adventures throughout a single summer night.

While Lucas was working on his first film, THX 1138, Coppola asked him to write a coming-of-age film. The genesis of American Graffiti took place in Modesto in the early 1960s, during Lucas' teenage years. He was unsuccessful in pitching the concept to financiers and distributors but found favor at Universal Pictures after every other major film studio turned him down. Filming began in San Rafael, California, but the production crew was denied permission to shoot beyond a second day. As a result, production was moved to Petaluma, California. It is the first film to be produced by his Lucasfilm production banner.

American Graffiti premiered on August 2, 1973, at the Locarno International Film Festival in Switzerland and was released in the United States on August 11, 1973. Despite low expectations from Universal Pictures, who initially planned to release it as a television film, the film was given a theatrical release after Francis Ford Coppola, fresh off the success of The Godfather, agreed to attach his name as an executive producer. Completed on a modest budget of $777,000 (equivalent to about $6.2 million in 2026), American Graffiti became one of the most profitable films on record, earning over $200 million in box office and home video revenue. It also surpassed Airport (1970) as the highest grossing film in Universal Studios' history, until The Sting surpassed it in 1974.

The film received widespread critical acclaim and was nominated for five Academy Awards, including Best Picture. It is widely credited with launching a wave of 1950s and early 1960s nostalgia in American pop culture, influencing the teen comedy genre and reviving interest in early rock and roll among the baby boomer generation. In 1995, it was selected for preservation in the National Film Registry by the Library of Congress for being "culturally, historically, or aesthetically significant."

== Plot ==
On Sunday, September 2, 1962, the last day of summer vacation, high school graduates Curt Henderson and Steve Bolander meet their friends, confident drag-racing king John Milner and unpopular but well-meaning Terry "The Toad" Fields, at Mel's Drive-In in Modesto, California. Set to travel "Back East" with Steve in the morning to start college, Curt has second thoughts about leaving. Laurie, Steve's girlfriend and Curt's sister, is hurt when Steve suggests they see other people while he is away to "strengthen" their relationship.

En route to the high school sock hop, Curt sees a beautiful blonde woman driving a white Ford Thunderbird who mouths "I love you", leading him to desperately search for her throughout the night. Leaving the dance, he is coerced into joining a group of greasers called "the Pharaohs" in stealing coins from arcade machines and hooking a stout wire rope to a police car, ripping out its back axle. During a tense ride, the Pharaoh leader tells Curt that the blonde is a prostitute, which he does not believe.

Allowed to take care of Steve's car while he is at college, Terry cruises around the strip and picks up the rebellious Debbie. Telling her he is known as "Terry the Tiger", he spends the night trying to impress her, lying about the car and purchasing alcohol with no ID. The car is stolen while they share a romantic interlude and later, after the alcohol has made Terry violently sick, he attempts to steal it back. The thieves beat on Terry until John shows up and fends off the attackers. Terry eventually admits the truth to Debbie and reveals he rides a Vespa scooter; she suggests it is "almost a motorcycle" and says she had fun, agreeing to meet up with him again.

Seeking cruising company, John inadvertently picks up Carol, a precocious 12-year-old who manipulates him into driving her around all night. He lies to suspicious friends that she is a cousin he is stuck babysitting, and they have a series of petty arguments until another car's young male occupants harass her as she attempts to walk home alone, and John decides to protect her. The racer, Bob Falfa, wants to compete for John's drag-racing crown. During his night of challenging anyone he comes across, Bob picks up an emotional Laurie after a long-brewing argument with Steve.

Leaving the Pharaohs, Curt drives to the radio station to ask the omnipresent disc jockey "Wolfman Jack" to read a message on the air for the blonde. A station employee tells him the Wolfman does not work there and the shows are taped, claiming the Wolfman "is everywhere". He says the Wolfman would advise Curt to "get your ass in gear" and see the world but promises to have the Wolfman air the request. As Curt leaves, he realizes the employee is the Wolfman, who reads the message to the blonde asking her to call Curt at the Mel's Drive-In payphone.

After taking Carol home, John is goaded by Bob into drag racing along Paradise Road outside the city with a crowd of spectators. Terry starts the race and John takes the lead but Bob's tire blows out, causing his car to swerve into a ditch and roll over before bursting into flames. Steve rushes to the wreck as Laurie and Bob crawl out before the car explodes. While John helps his rival to safety, Laurie begs Steve not to leave her and he assures her that he will stay with her in Modesto.

An exhausted Curt is awakened by the payphone and finally speaks to the mysterious blonde, who hints at the possibility of meeting the following night, but Curt replies that he is leaving town. In the morning at the airfield, he says goodbye to his parents and friends; after takeoff, he sees the white Thunderbird driving along the road below, and gazes thoughtfully into the sky.

An epilogue reveals the four male friends' fates: in 1964, John was killed by a drunk driver; in 1965, Terry was reported missing in action near An Lộc, South Vietnam; Steve is an insurance agent in Modesto, and Curt is a writer living in Canada.

== Cast ==
=== Main credits ===
- Richard Dreyfuss as Curt Henderson
- Ron Howard (credited as Ronny Howard) as Steve Bolander
- Paul Le Mat as John Millner
- Charles Martin Smith (credited as Charlie Martin Smith) as Terry Fields
- Candy Clark as Debbie
- Mackenzie Phillips as Carol
- Cindy Williams as Laurie
- Wolfman Jack as the Disc Jockey
- Bo Hopkins as Joe
- Harrison Ford as Bob Falfa
- Manuel Padilla Jr. as Carlos
- Flash Cadillac & the Continental Kids as Herby & the Heartbeats

=== Notable ensemble ===
- Lynne Marie Stewart as Bobbie
- Terry McGovern as Mr. Wolfe
- Kathleen Quinlan as Peg
- Scott Beach as Mr. Gordon
- Del Close as man at bar
- Susan Richardson as Judy
- Kay Lenz (credited as Kay Ann Kemper) as Jane
- Joe Spano as Vic
- Debralee Scott as Falfa's girl
- Suzanne Somers as the blonde in the T-Bird
- Rick May as the boy in the car (uncredited)

== Development ==
=== Inspiration ===
During the production of THX 1138 (1971), producer Francis Ford Coppola challenged co-writer/director George Lucas to write a script that would appeal to mainstream audiences. Lucas embraced the idea, using his early 1960s teenage experiences cruising in Modesto, California. "Cruising was gone, and I felt compelled to document the whole experience and what my generation used as a way of meeting girls", Lucas explained. As he developed the story in his mind, Lucas included his fascination with Wolfman Jack. Lucas had considered doing a documentary about the Wolfman when he attended the USC School of Cinematic Arts, but he ultimately dropped the idea.

Adding in semiautobiographical connotations, Lucas set the story in his hometown of 1962 Modesto. The characters Curt Henderson, John Milner, and Terry "The Toad" Fields also represent different stages from his younger life. Curt is modeled after Lucas's personality during USC, while John is based on Lucas's teenaged street-racing and junior-college years, and hot rod enthusiasts he had known from the Kustom Kulture in Modesto. Terry represents Lucas's nerd years as a freshman in high school, specifically his "bad luck" with dating. The filmmaker was also inspired by Federico Fellini's I Vitelloni (1953).

After the financial failure of THX 1138, Lucas wanted the film to act as a release for a world-weary audience:

[THX] was about real things that were going on and the problems we're faced with. I realized after making THX that those problems are so real that most of us have to face those things every day, so we're in a constant state of frustration. That just makes us more depressed than we were before. So I made a film where, essentially, we can get rid of some of those frustrations, the feeling that everything seems futile.

=== United Artists ===
After Warner Bros. abandoned Lucas's early version of Apocalypse Now (during the post-production of THX 1138), the filmmaker decided to continue developing Another Quiet Night in Modesto, eventually changing its title to American Graffiti. To co-write a 15-page film treatment, Lucas hired Willard Huyck and Gloria Katz, who also added semiautobiographical material to the story. Lucas and his colleague Gary Kurtz began pitching the American Graffiti treatment to various Hollywood studios and production companies in an attempt to secure the financing needed to expand it into a screenplay, but they were unsuccessful. The potential financiers were concerned that music licensing costs would cause the film to go way over budget. Along with Easy Rider (1969), American Graffiti was one of the first films to eschew a traditional film score and successfully rely instead on synchronizing a series of popular hit songs with individual scenes.

THX 1138 was released in March 1971, and Lucas was offered opportunities to direct Lady Ice, Tommy, or Hair. He turned down those offers, determined to pursue his own projects despite his urgent desire to find another film to direct. During this time, Lucas conceived the idea for a space opera (as yet untitled) which later became the basis for his Star Wars franchise. At the 1971 Cannes Film Festival, THX was chosen for the Directors' Fortnight competition. There, Lucas met David Picker, then president of United Artists, who was intrigued by American Graffiti and Lucas's space opera. Picker decided to give Lucas $10,000 (equivalent to about $61,000 in 2025 dollars) to develop Graffiti as a screenplay.

Lucas planned to spend another five weeks in Europe and hoped that Huyck and Katz would agree to finish the screenplay by the time he returned, but they were about to start on their own film, Messiah of Evil, so Lucas hired Richard Walter, a colleague from the USC School of Cinematic Arts for the job. Walter was flattered, but initially tried to sell Lucas on a different screenplay called Barry and the Persuasions, a story of East Coast teenagers in the late 1950s. Lucas held firm—his was a story about West Coast teenagers in the early 1960s. Walter was paid the $10,000, and he began to expand the Lucas/Huyck/Katz treatment into a screenplay.

Lucas was dismayed when he returned to America in June 1971 and read Walter's script, which was written in the style and tone of an exploitation film, similar to 1967's Hot Rods to Hell. "It was overtly sexual and very fantasy-like, with playing chicken and things that kids didn't really do", Lucas explained. "I wanted something that was more like the way I grew up." Walter's script also had Steve and Laurie going to Nevada to get married without their parents' permission. Walter rewrote the screenplay, but Lucas nevertheless fired him due to their creative differences.

After paying Walter, Lucas had exhausted his development fund from United Artists. He began writing a script, completing his first draft in just three weeks. Drawing upon his large collection of vintage records, Lucas wrote each scene with a particular song in mind as its musical backdrop. The cost of licensing the 75 songs Lucas wanted was one factor in United Artists' ultimate decision to reject the script; the studio also felt it was too experimental—"a musical montage with no characters". United Artists also passed on Star Wars, which Lucas shelved for the time being.

=== Universal Pictures ===
Lucas spent the rest of 1971 and early 1972 trying to raise financing for the American Graffiti script. During this time, Metro-Goldwyn-Mayer, Paramount Pictures, 20th Century Fox, and Columbia Pictures all turned down the opportunity to co-finance and distribute the film. Lucas, Huyck and Katz rewrote the second draft together, which, in addition to Modesto, was also set in Mill Valley and Los Angeles. Lucas also intended to end American Graffiti showing a title card detailing the fate of the characters, including the death of Milner and the disappearance of Toad in Vietnam. Huyck and Katz found the ending depressing and were incredulous that Lucas planned to include only the male characters. Lucas argued that mentioning the girls meant adding another title card, which he felt would prolong the ending. Because of this, Pauline Kael later accused Lucas of chauvinism.

Lucas and producer Gary Kurtz took the script to American International Pictures, who expressed interest, but ultimately believed American Graffiti was not violent or sexual enough for the studio's standards. Lucas and Kurtz eventually found favor at Universal Pictures, who allowed Lucas total artistic control and the right of final cut privilege on the condition that he make American Graffiti on a strict low budget. This forced Lucas to drop the opening scene in which the Blonde Angel, Curt's image of the perfect woman, drives through an empty drive-in theater in her Ford Thunderbird, her transparency revealing she does not exist.

Universal initially projected a $600,000 budget but added an additional $175,000 once producer Francis Ford Coppola signed on. This would allow the studio to advertise American Graffiti as "from the man who gave you The Godfather". The proposition also gave Universal first-look deals on Lucas's next two planned projects, Star Wars and Radioland Murders. As he continued to work on the script, Lucas encountered difficulties on the Steve and Laurie storyline. Lucas, Katz, and Huyck worked on the third draft together, specifically on the scenes featuring Steve and Laurie.

Production proceeded with virtually no input or interference from Universal since American Graffiti was a low-budget film, and executive Ned Tanen had only modest expectations of its commercial success. However, Universal did object to the film's title, not knowing what "American Graffiti" meant; Lucas was dismayed when some executives assumed he was making an Italian film about feet. The studio, therefore, submitted a long list of over 60 alternative titles, with their favorite being Another Slow Night in Modesto and Coppola's Rock Around the Block. They pushed hard to get Lucas to adopt any of the titles, but he was displeased with all the alternatives and persuaded Tanen to keep American Graffiti.

== Production ==
=== Casting ===
The film's lengthy casting process was overseen by Fred Roos, who worked with producer Francis Ford Coppola on The Godfather. Because American Graffiti's main cast was for younger actors, the casting call and notices went through numerous high-school drama groups and community theaters in the San Francisco Bay Area. Among the actors was Mark Hamill, the future Luke Skywalker in Lucas's Star Wars trilogy.

Over 100 unknown actors auditioned for Curt Henderson before Richard Dreyfuss was cast; George Lucas was impressed with Dreyfuss's thoughtful analysis of the role, and as a result, offered the actor his choice of Curt or Terry "The Toad" Fields. Roos, a former casting director on The Andy Griffith Show, suggested Ron Howard for Steve Bolander; Howard accepted the role to break out of the mold of his career as a child actor. Howard would later appear in the very similar role of Richie Cunningham on the Happy Days sitcom. Bob Balaban turned down Terry out of fear of becoming typecast, a decision he later regretted. Charles Martin Smith, who, in his first year as a professional actor, had already appeared in two feature films, including 20th Century Fox's The Culpepper Cattle Co. and four TV episodes, was eventually cast in the role.

Although Cindy Williams was cast as Laurie Henderson and enjoyed working with both Lucas and Howard, the actress hoped she would get the part of Debbie Dunham, which ended up going to Candy Clark. Mackenzie Phillips, who portrays Carol, was only 12, and under California law, producer Gary Kurtz had to become her legal guardian for the duration of filming. For Bob Falfa, Roos cast Harrison Ford, who was then concentrating on a carpentry career. Ford agreed to take the role on the condition that he would not have to cut his hair, in case he was offered other film or TV roles set in the "present day" of the 1970s. The character has a flattop in the script, but a compromise was eventually reached whereby Ford wore a Stetson to cover his hair. Producer Coppola encouraged Lucas to cast Wolfman Jack as himself in a cameo appearance. "George Lucas and I went through thousands of Wolfman Jack phone calls that were taped with the public", Jack reflected. "The telephone calls [heard on the broadcasts] in the motion picture and on the soundtrack were actual calls with real people."

=== Filming ===
Although American Graffiti is set in 1962 Modesto, Lucas believed the city had changed too much in ten years and initially chose San Rafael as the primary shooting location. Filming began on June 26, 1972. However, Lucas soon became frustrated at the length of time it was taking to fix camera mounts to the cars. A key member of the production had also been arrested for growing marijuana, and in addition to already running behind the shooting schedule, the San Rafael City Council immediately became concerned about the disruption that filming caused for local businesses, so withdrew permission to shoot beyond a second day.

Petaluma, a similarly small town about 20 miles (32 km) north of San Rafael, was more cooperative, and American Graffiti moved there without the loss of a single day of shooting. Lucas convinced the San Rafael City Council to allow two further nights of filming for general cruising shots, which he used to evoke as much of the intended location as possible in the finished film. Shooting in Petaluma began June 28 and proceeded at a quick pace. Lucas mimicked the filmmaking style of B-movie producer Sam Katzman (Rock Around the Clock, Your Cheatin' Heart, and the aforementioned Hot Rods to Hell) in attempting to save money using low-budget filming methods.

In addition to Petaluma, other locations included Mel's Drive-In in San Francisco, Sonoma, Richmond, Novato, and the Buchanan Field Airport in Concord. The freshman hop dance was filmed in the Gus Gymnasium, previously known as the Boys Gym, at Tamalpais High School in Mill Valley.

More problems ensued during filming; Paul Le Mat was sent to the hospital after an allergic reaction to walnuts. Le Mat, Harrison Ford, and Bo Hopkins were claimed to be drunk most nights and every weekend, and had conducted climbing competitions to the top of the local Holiday Inn sign. One actor set fire to Lucas's motel room. Another night, Le Mat threw Richard Dreyfuss into a swimming pool, gashing Dreyfuss's forehead on the day before he was due to have his close-ups filmed. Dreyfuss also complained over the wardrobe that Lucas had chosen for the character. Ford was kicked out of his motel room at the Holiday Inn. In addition, two camera operators were nearly killed when filming the climactic race scene on Frates Road outside Petaluma. Principal photography ended on August 4, 1972.

The final scenes in the film, shot at Buchanan Field, feature a Douglas DC-7C airliner of Magic Carpet Airlines, which had previously been leased from owner Club America Incorporated by the rock band Grand Funk Railroad from March to June 1971.

=== Cinematography ===
Lucas considered covering duties as the sole cinematographer, but dropped the idea. Instead, he elected to shoot American Graffiti using two cinematographers (as he had done in THX 1138) and no formal director of photography. Two cameras were used simultaneously in scenes involving conversations between actors in different cars, which resulted in significant production time savings. After CinemaScope proved to be too expensive, Lucas decided American Graffiti should have a documentary-like feel, so he shot the film using Techniscope cameras. He believed that Techniscope, an inexpensive way of shooting on 35 mm film and using only half of the film's frame, would give a perfect widescreen format resembling 16 mm. Adding to the documentary feel was Lucas's openness for the cast to improvise scenes. He also used goofs for the final cut, notably Charles Martin Smith's arriving on his scooter to meet Steve outside Mel's Drive-In. Jan D'Alquen and Ron Eveslage were hired as the cinematographers, but filming with Techniscope cameras brought lighting problems. As a result, Lucas commissioned help from friend Haskell Wexler, who was credited as the "visual consultant".

=== Editing ===
Lucas had wanted his then wife, Marcia, to edit American Graffiti, but Universal executive Ned Tanen insisted on hiring Verna Fields, who had just finished editing Steven Spielberg's The Sugarland Express. Fields worked on the first rough cut of the film before she left to resume work on What's Up, Doc?. After Fields's departure, Lucas struggled with editing the film's story structure. He had originally written the script so that the four (Curt, Steve, John, and Toad) storylines were always presented in the same sequence (an "ABCD" plot structure). The first cut of American Graffiti was three and a half hours long, and to whittle the film down to a more manageable two hours, many scenes had to be cut, shortened, or combined. As a result, the film's structure became increasingly loose and no longer adhered to Lucas's original "ABCD" presentation. Lucas completed his final cut of American Graffiti, which ran 112 minutes, in December 1972. Walter Murch assisted Lucas in post-production for audio mixing and sound design purposes. Murch suggested making Wolfman Jack's radio show the "backbone" of the film. "The Wolfman was an ethereal presence in the lives of young people", said producer Gary Kurtz, "and it was that quality we wanted and obtained in the picture."

== Soundtrack ==
The choice of music was crucial to the mood of each scene; it is diegetic music that the characters themselves can hear and therefore becomes an integral part of the action. George Lucas had to be realistic about the complexities of copyright clearances, though, and suggested a number of alternative tracks. Universal wanted Lucas and producer Gary Kurtz to hire an orchestra for sound-alikes. The studio eventually proposed a flat deal that offered every music publisher the same amount of money. This was acceptable to most of the companies representing Lucas's first choices, but not to RCA—with the consequence that Elvis Presley is conspicuously absent from the soundtrack. Clearing the music licensing rights had cost approximately $90,000, and as a result, no money was left for a traditional film score. "I used the absence of music, and sound effects, to create the drama", Lucas later explained.

When it came to the ending credits, only the song's title, artist, and the record label was listed. However, the names of the composers and lyricists, as well as the publishing company and the copyright year, were completely left out. This resulted in several of the songwriters filing lawsuits against MCA for leaving their names out of the credits. A settlement was reached in which MCA paid the damages to the songwriters, as well as to the publishing companies.

A soundtrack album for the film, 41 Original Hits from the Soundtrack of American Graffiti, was issued by MCA Records. The album contains all the songs used in the film (with the exception of "Gee" by the Crows, which was subsequently included on a second soundtrack album), presented in the order in which they appeared in the film.

== Release ==
Despite unanimous praise at a January 1973 test screening attended by Universal executive Ned Tanen, the studio told Lucas they wanted to re-edit his original cut of American Graffiti. Producer Coppola sided with Lucas against Tanen and Universal, offering to "buy the film" from the studio and reimburse it for the $775,000 (equivalent to $4.5 million in 2025) that it had cost to make it. 20th Century Fox and Paramount Pictures made similar offers to the studio. Universal refused these offers and told Lucas they planned to have William Hornbeck re-edit the film.

When Coppola's The Godfather won the Academy Award for Best Picture in March 1973, Universal relented and agreed to cut only three scenes (amounting to a few minutes) from Lucas's cut. These include an encounter between Toad and a fast-talking car salesman, an argument between Steve and his former teacher Mr. Kroot at the sock hop, and an effort by Bob Falfa to serenade Laurie with "Some Enchanted Evening". The studio initially thought that the film was only fit for release as a television film.

Various studio employees who had seen the film began talking it up, and its reputation grew through word of mouth. The studio dropped the TV film idea and began arranging for a limited release in selected theaters in Los Angeles and New York. Universal presidents Sidney Sheinberg and Lew Wasserman heard about the praise the film had been garnering in LA and New York, and the marketing department amped up its promotion strategy for it, investing an additional $500,000 (equivalent to $2.8 million in 2025) in marketing and promotion. The film was released in the United States on August 11, 1973 to sleeper hit reception. The film had cost only $1.27 million (equivalent to $7.4 million in 2025) to produce and market, but yielded worldwide box office gross revenues of more than $55 million (equivalent to $399 million in 2025). It had only modest success outside the United States and Canada, but became a cult film in France.

Universal reissued Graffiti on May 26, 1978, with Dolby sound and earned an additional $63 million (equivalent to $311 million in 2025), which brought the total revenue for the two releases to $118 million (equivalent to $580 million in 2025). The reissue included stereophonic sound and a couple of minutes the studio had removed from Lucas's original cut. All home video releases also included these scenes. Also, the date of John Milner's death was changed from June 1964 to December 1964 to fit the narrative structure of the upcoming sequel, More American Graffiti. At the end of its theatrical run, American Graffiti had one of the greatest profit-to-cost ratios of a motion picture ever.

Producer Francis Ford Coppola regretted having not financed the film himself. Lucas recalled, "He would have made $30 million (equivalent to $220 million in 2025) on the deal. He never got over it and he still kicks himself." It was the 13th-highest-grossing film of all time in 1977 and, adjusted for inflation, is currently the 43rd highest. By the 1990s, American Graffiti had earned more than $200 million (equivalent to $490 million in 2025) in box-office gross and home video sales. In December 1997, Variety reported that the film had earned an additional $55.13 million in rental revenue (equivalent to $111 million in 2025).

Universal Studios first released the film on DVD in September 1998, and once more as a double feature with More American Graffiti (1979) in January 2004. The 1978 version of the film was used, with an additional digital change to the sky in the opening title sequence. Additionally, the 1998 DVD and VHS releases were both THX certified as well. Universal released the film on Blu-ray with a new digitally remastered picture supervised by George Lucas on May 31, 2011. In celebration of its 50th anniversary, a 4K restoration of the film updated with a brand new 5.1 sound mix was re-released domestically on August 27 and 30 before a Ultra HD Blu-ray release on November 7, 2023.

== Reception ==
American Graffiti received widespread critical acclaim. Roger Ebert gave the film a full four stars and praised it for being "not only a great movie, but a brilliant work of historical fiction; no sociological treatise could duplicate the movie's success in remembering exactly how it was to be alive at that cultural instant". Gene Siskel awarded three-and-a-half stars out of four, writing that although the film suffered from an "overkill" of nostalgia, particularly with regards to a soundtrack so overstuffed that it amounted to "one of those golden-oldie TV blurbs", it was still "well-made, does achieve moments of genuine emotion, and does provide a sock (hop) full of memories."

Vincent Canby of The New York Times wrote, "American Graffiti is such a funny, accurate movie, so controlled and efficient in its narrative, that it stands to be overpraised to the point where seeing it will be an anticlimax." A. D. Murphy from Variety felt American Graffiti was a vivid "recall of teenage attitudes and morals, told with outstanding empathy and compassion through an exceptionally talented cast of unknown actors". Charles Champlin of The New York Times called it a "masterfully executed and profoundly affecting movie". Jay Cocks of Time magazine wrote that American Graffiti "reveals a new and welcome depth of feeling. Few films have shown quite so well the eagerness, the sadness, the ambitions and small defeats of a generation of young Americans."

Pauline Kael of The New Yorker was less enthused, writing that the film "fails to be anything more than a warm, nice, draggy comedy, because there's nothing to back up the style. The images aren't as visually striking as they would be if only there were a mind at work behind them; the movie has no resonance except from the jukebox sound and the eerie, nocturnal jukebox look." She also noted with disdain that the epilogue did not bother to mention the fates of any of the women characters. Dave Kehr, writing in the Chicago Reader, called the film a brilliant work of popular art that redefined nostalgia as a marketable commodity, while establishing a new narrative style.

On the review aggregator website Rotten Tomatoes, the film holds an approval rating of 95% based on 62 reviews, with an average score of 8.6/10. The website's critics consensus reads, "One of the most influential of all teen films, American Graffiti is a funny, nostalgic, and bittersweet look at a group of recent high school grads' last days of innocence." On Metacritic, which assigns a weighted average score out of 100 to reviews from mainstream critics, the film received an average score of 97, based on 15 critics, indicating "universal acclaim".

=== Themes ===
American Graffiti depicts multiple characters going through a coming of age, such as the decisions to attend college or reside in a small town. The 1962 setting represents nearing an end of an era in American society and pop culture. The early 1960s musical backdrop also links between the early years of rock 'n' roll in the mid- to late 1950s (i.e., Bill Haley & His Comets, Elvis Presley, and Buddy Holly), and mid-1960s, beginning with the January 1964 arrival of The Beatles and the following British Invasion, which Don McLean's "American Pie" and the early 1970s revival of 1950s acts and oldies paralleled during the conception and filming.

The setting is two months before the Cuban Missile Crisis, and before the outbreak of the Vietnam War and the John F. Kennedy assassination and before the peak years of the counterculture movement. American Graffiti evokes mankind's relationship with machines, notably the elaborate number of hot rods—having been called a "classic-car flick", representative of the motor car's importance to American culture at the time it was made. Another theme is teenagers' obsession with radio, especially with the inclusion of Wolfman Jack and his mysterious and mythological faceless (to most) voice.

=== Accolades ===
Award	Category	Recipient(s)	Result
Academy Awards	Best Picture	Francis Ford Coppola and Gary Kurtz	Nominated
Academy Awards	Best Director	George Lucas	Nominated
Academy Awards	Best Supporting Actress	Candy Clark	Nominated
Academy Awards	Best Story and Screenplay Based on Factual Material or Material Not Previously Produced or Published	George Lucas, Gloria Katz, and Willard Huyck	Nominated
Academy Awards	Best Film Editing	Verna Fields and Marcia Lucas	Nominated
British Academy Film Awards	Best Actress in a Supporting Role	Cindy Williams	Nominated
Directors Guild of America Awards	Outstanding Directorial Achievement in Motion Pictures	George Lucas	Nominated
Golden Globe Awards	Best Motion Picture – Musical or Comedy	American Graffiti	Won
Golden Globe Awards	Best Actor in a Motion Picture – Musical or Comedy	Richard Dreyfuss	Nominated
Golden Globe Awards	Best Director – Motion Picture	George Lucas	Nominated
Golden Globe Awards	Most Promising Newcomer – Male	Paul Le Mat	Won
Kansas City Film Critics Circle Awards	Best Film	American Graffiti	Won
Locarno International Film Festival	Bronze Leopard	George Lucas	Won
Nastro d'Argento	Best Foreign Director	George Lucas	Nominated
National Film Preservation Board	National Film Registry	American Graffiti	Inducted
National Society of Film Critics Awards	Best Supporting Actress	Cindy Williams	5th Place
National Society of Film Critics Awards	Best Screenplay	George Lucas, Gloria Katz, and Willard Huyck	Won
New York Film Critics Circle Awards	Best Film	American Graffiti	Runner-up
New York Film Critics Circle Awards	Best Screenplay	George Lucas, Gloria Katz, and Willard Huyck	Won
Online Film & Television Association Awards	Hall of Fame – Motion Picture	American Graffiti	Honored
Writers Guild of America Awards	Best Comedy – Written Directly for the Screen	George Lucas, Gloria Katz, and Willard Huyck	Nominated

The film is recognized by American Film Institute in these lists:

- 1998: AFI's 100 Years...100 Movies – No. 77
- 2000: AFI's 100 Years...100 Laughs – No. 43
- 2007: AFI's 100 Years...100 Movies (10th Anniversary Edition) – No. 62

== Legacy ==
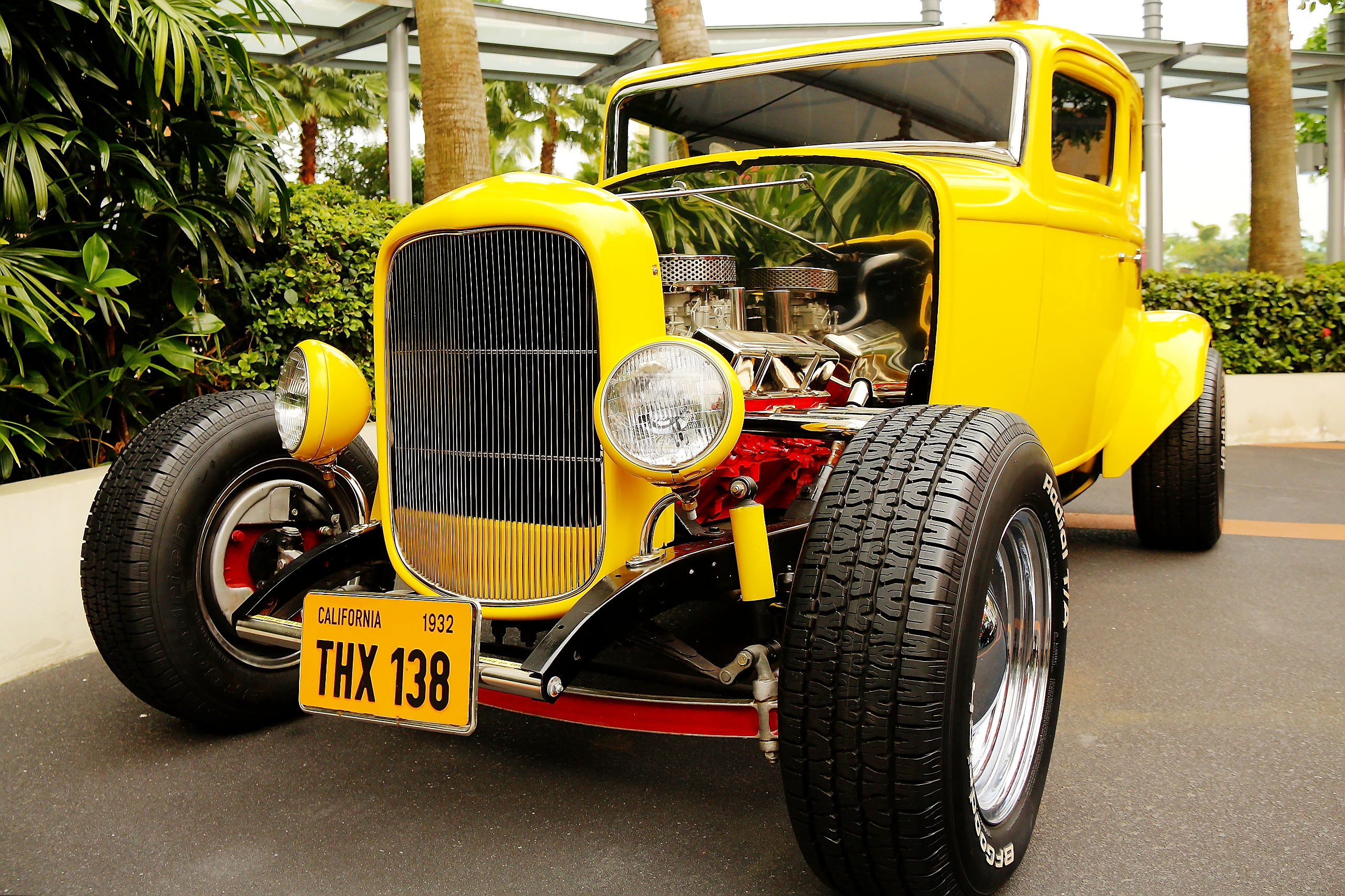
John Milner's deuce coupe replica at Universal Studios Singapore

Internet reviewer MaryAnn Johanson acknowledged that American Graffiti rekindled public and entertainment interest in the 1950s and early 1960s, and influenced other films such as The Lords of Flatbush (1974) and Cooley High (1975) and the TV series Happy Days. Alongside other films from the New Hollywood era, American Graffiti is often cited for helping give birth to the summer blockbuster. The film's box-office success made George Lucas an instant millionaire. He gave an amount of the film's profits to Haskell Wexler for his visual consulting help during filming, and to Wolfman Jack for "inspiration". Lucas's net worth grew to $4 million, and he set aside a $300,000 independent fund for his long-cherished space opera project, which would eventually become the basis for Star Wars (1977).

The financial success of Graffiti also gave Lucas opportunities to establish more elaborate development for Lucasfilm, Skywalker Sound, and Industrial Light & Magic. Based on the success of the 1978 reissue, Universal began production for the sequel More American Graffiti (1979). Lucas and writers Willard Huyck and Gloria Katz later collaborated on Howard the Duck (1986) and Radioland Murders (1994). They were both released by Universal Pictures, for which Lucas acted as executive producer. Radioland Murders features characters intended to be Curt and Laurie Henderson's parents, Roger and Penny Henderson. In 1995, American Graffiti was deemed culturally, historically, or aesthetically significant by the United States Library of Congress and selected for preservation in the National Film Registry. In 1997, the city of Modesto, California (where the film largely takes place), honored Lucas with a statue dedication of American Graffiti at George Lucas Plaza. Furthermore, the city has an annual classic car festival in honor of its graffiti culture heritage.

Director David Fincher credited American Graffiti as a visual influence for Fight Club (1999). Lucas's Star Wars: Episode II – Attack of the Clones (2002) features references to the film. The yellow airspeeder that Anakin Skywalker and Obi-Wan Kenobi use to pursue bounty hunter Zam Wesell is based on John Milner's yellow deuce coupe, while Dex's Diner is reminiscent of Mel's Drive-In. Adam Savage and Jamie Hyneman conducted the "rear axle" experiment on the January 11, 2004, episode of MythBusters.

Given the popularity of the film's cars with customizers and hot rodders in the years since its release, their fate immediately after the film is surprising. All were offered for sale in San Francisco newspaper ads; only the '58 Impala (driven by Ron Howard) attracted a buyer, selling for only a few hundred dollars. The yellow deuce coupe and the Pharaohs' red Mercury went unsold, despite the coupe being priced as low as $1500. The registration plate on Milner's yellow deuce coupe is THX 138 on a yellow, California license plate, slightly altered, reflecting Lucas's earlier science-fiction film (THX 1138).

== See also ==
- 1960s in the United States
- List of American films of 1973
- Modesto American Graffiti Festival
- Grease
- Happy Days
- United States in the 1950s
