= List of IGPX characters =

The following is a list of characters in the anime series Immortal Grand Prix, which ran for two seasons.

== Team Satomi ==
Team Satomi is a team of young rookies from the United States who just won the league IG-2 Championship and are entering the leagues as an IG-1 team. Though young and inexperienced, they achieved the dream of going from obscurity to winning in the IG-1 twice.

=== Team Satomi race record ===
In both seasons, Team Satomi begins with a 1–1–1 record and finishes with four victories, including a win in the final against the team that they previously lost to and tied with.

Season 1 (2049)
Race	Winner
Satomi v. Sledge Mamma	Tie
Satomi v. Black Egg	Satomi
Satomi v. Velshtein	Velshtein
Satomi v. Edgeraid	Satomi
Satomi v. Skylark	Satomi
Satomi v. Sledge Mamma	Satomi
Satomi v. Velshtein	Satomi

Season 2 (2050)
Race	Winner
Satomi v. Edgeraid	Satomi
Satomi v. White Snow	White Snow
Satomi v. Velshtein	Tie
Satomi v. Skylark	Satomi
Satomi v. Sledge Mamma	Satomi
Satomi v. Velshtein	Satomi
Satomi v. White Snow	Satomi

=== Pilots ===
Takeshi Jin (Takeshi Jinno (ジンノ・タケシ, Jinno Takeshi) in the Japanese version)

Voiced by: Kōzō Mito (Japanese); Haley Joel Osment (English)
Position: Forward
Nationality: (United States) American
Age: 15 years old
Gender: Male
Height: 169 cm
Weight: 56 kg
Team Satomi's forward, Takeshi is a gifted pilot who frequently defeats Liz Ricarro when his talent gets to his head. Takeshi seems to take nothing seriously, but he has strong determination when racing and is a practitioner of kendo. He has an affinity for hot dogs and video games, particularly Watch World, where his dog-like character is named Katana. Though a skilled pilot, Takeshi has an emotional breakdown from a blow to his ego. Unlike his teammates, he seems to have a normal family life, along with a younger sister named Yuri, who loves him dearly and is his self-proclaimed biggest fan and supporter despite loving to tease him and barge in on him without asking. Takeshi also admires his idol, a famous IGPX pilot known as Rocket G, or simply "The Rocket", as a source of inspiration, who is later revealed to be Team Satomi's coach Andrei Rublev. Takeshi was an item with Fantine Valjean and met her when playing Watch World; however, in season 2, they broke up, as Fantine realized that Takeshi and Liz have feelings for each other and thought of Takeshi as a friendly rival rather than a boyfriend. He also matures throughout the series, and in the final episode he and Liz admit their feelings for each other.

Elizabeth "Liz" Ricarro (リズ・リカーロ, Rizu Rikāro)

Voiced by: Akeno Watanabe (Japanese); Michelle Rodriguez (English)
Position: Defender
Nationality: (United States) American
Age: 16 years old
Gender: Female
Height: 172 cm
Weight: 50 kg
Team Satomi's defender, a loud, busty, and hot-tempered tomboyish orphan whose only family is her teammates and coaches; her dedication to IGPX comes from it being something she fit in with. It is revealed in episode 6, "Cat vs. Dog", that Liz dislikes animals, especially dogs. She is an avid martial artist, always practicing Kung Fu (Capoeira in the microseries) and quoting Confucius. Takeshi's contrasting attitude and antics on and off the track annoy her, but it is because she feels he is not being 'honest' with her about his feelings. At the end of the series, they finally admit their feelings for each other. It is revealed that she is an orphan, and she goes into modeling to use the money to save her orphanage.

Amy Stapleton (エイミー・ステイプルトン, Eimī Suteipuruton)

Voiced by: Ryōko Ono (Japanese); Hynden Walch (English)
Position: Midfielder
Nationality: (United States) American
Age: 16 years old
Gender: Female
Height: 166 cm
Weight: 43 kg
A child prodigy, Amy is Team Satomi's midfielder and battle tactician. She, being the physically weakest of the team, synchronizes with her cybernetically enhanced calico cat, Luca (ルカ, Ruka) (Vanilla Yamazaki, Kari Wahlgren), to form a composite personality during IGPX Races. Quiet and sympathetic, Amy will often patch up conflicts between other team members, but her sweetness belies her considerable combat abilities. In season 2, Amy is injured in Satomi's race against White Snow and Andrei replaces her for both Velshtein vs Satomi and Skylark vs. Satomi matches. Throughout the series, only Amy could hear Luca's 'voice' during races; however, at the beginning of Satomi's first race of the 2051 racing season, it is revealed that all members of Team Satomi are now able to hear his voice. In episode 4, "The Ghost", it is revealed that Amy dearly misses her parents, who are always out on business.

=== Other team members ===
Michiru Satomi (サトミ・ミチル, Satomi Michiru)

Voiced by: Emi Shinohara (Japanese); Kari Wahlgren (English)
Position: Team supervision and owner
Nationality: (United States) American
Age: 25 years old
Gender: Female
Michiru Satomi is the granddaughter of the late founding chairman and CEO of Satomi Heavy Industries. Her family allows her to manage Team Satomi in hopes that she can turn the failing franchise into a success story. Though young, she is a hard worker and knows that she has a special team, including a one-in-a-million pilot like Takeshi.

Andrei Rublev (アンドレ・ルブレブ, Andore Ruburebu)

Voiced by: Masahiko Tanaka (Japanese); Lance Henriksen (English)
Position: Coach / Substitute Pilot (Midfielder)
Nationality: (United States) American
Age: 45 years old
Gender: Male
The coach of Team Satomi. Andrei practices an almost "zen" coaching style, in which he appears to be doing very little and motivates the team primarily with cryptic comments and instructions. The other team members do not know about Andrei's past prior to his joining Team Satomi, apparently as a result of Andrei's contracts with unknown persons. However, a promise that Andrei makes to Takeshi suggests that he could have connections with or be Rocket G. It was later revealed that he is the Rocket and used to race with Sir Hamgra of Team Velshtein. He substitutes for Amy after she is injured during Satomi's race against White Snow, and plays Midfielder during their matches against Velshtein and Skylark. Despite being out of practice, he surprises people by managing to hold his own during the races. It is noted, however, that despite his pacifistic coaching style, he is not above using 'questionable' tactics on the field; he intentionally spins out his mech and crashes into and destroys two of Velshtein's mechs during the speed round of their race to ensure that Satomi does not lose. He has a wife and a daughter, but they left him; however, due to his more positive lifestyle gained from coaching Team Satomi, they have returned and are living together once more.

Mark Ramsey (Masa Ishikawa (イシカワ・マサ, Ishikawa Masa) in the Japanese version)

Voiced by: Jin Horikawa (Japanese); Kirk Thornton (English)
Position: Mechanic
Nationality: (United States) American
Age: 26 years old
Gender: Male
One of the best IGPX mechanics in the game, who is in it for the love of his craft and may care more about his machines than the team's pilots. In Season 2, he was the first to recognize Max due to reading an article about her hacking into government servers until she was threatened with arrest. He is actually the heir to the Ramsey corp, the world's largest investment banking group, though he keeps it a closely guarded secret.

Jesse Martin (Himawari Aoi (アオイ・ヒマワリ, Aoi Himawari) in the Japanese version)

Voiced by: Yumi Sudō (Japanese); Julie Maddalena (English)
Position: Assistant
Age: 19 years old
Nationality: (United States) American
Gender: Female
Satomi's assistant. She is always the one to cheer up her fellow members of Team Satomi when they are depressed. When Satomi considered dropping out of the race between Team Satomi and Team Velshtein after Amy got sent to the hospital following the White Snow race, Jesse convinced her otherwise, inspiring Andrei to temporarily replace Amy as Midfielder.

== Team Black Egg ==
A team from Argentina that has a very distinct racing style: They place emphasis on defense rather than offense, preferring agility, smokescreens, and similar tactics to avoid attacks and concentrate on racing. Since the IGPX is descended from a battle sport, this strategy completely bowls over most teams. They placed sixth in Season 1, but finishing last place in Season 1 led to their demotion to the IG-2. Their place in the IG-1 is filled by a team promoted from the IG-2, Team White Snow. Their mechs are equipped with hologram projectors and smokescreens, which scramble enemy opponents when their mechs are in the smoke.

Ricardo Montazio (リカルド・モンタジオ, Rikarudo Montajio)

Voiced by: Katsuyuki Konishi (Japanese); Erik Davies (English)
Position: Forward
Nationality: (Argentina) Argentine
Age: 25
Gender: Male
Height: Unknown
Weight: Unknown
Ricardo Montazio is the forward and leader of Team Black Egg. He believes in defense rather than offense so that his team can win the race. Ricardo is honest, optimistic, and hardworking, and a good sport about losing.

Grant McKain (グラント・マッケイン, Guranto Makkein)

Voiced by: Hisanori Koyatsu
Position: Midfielder
Nationality: (Argentina) Argentine
Age: 20
Gender: Male
Height: Unknown
Weight: Unknown
Grant McKain is the midfielder for Team Black Egg. Not much is known about him other than the fact that he does not always seem to cooperate very well.

Roger "Glass" Jones (グラス・ジョーンズ, Gurasu Jōnzu)

Voiced by: Eiji Miyashita (Japanese); Dave Mallow (English)
Position: Defender
Nationality (Argentina) Argentine

Age: 17
Gender: Male
Height: Unknown
Weight: Unknown
Glass Jones is the defender for Team Black Egg and a girl-getter. He would rather hang out with females than take the race seriously. Glass underestimates the opponents, including Team Satomi.

== Team Edgeraid ==
A team from Switzerland based on teamwork. Edgeraid mechs are equipped with arms that shoot out thin, nearly invisible wires, which they use to manipulate their opponents and throw each other around the track. Edgeraid's speciality is the Edge Monsoon.

Bjorn Johannsen (ビョーン・ジョハンソン, Byōn Johanson)

Voiced by: Nobuo Tobita (Japanese); Crispin Freeman (English)
Position: Forward
Nationality: (Switzerland) Switz
Age: 22
Gender: Male
Height: 168 cm
Weight: 58 kg
Bjorn Johannsen is the forward and leader of Team Edgeraid. He takes pride in teamwork, which is what got his team far. Bjorn is not arrogant, but tends to think he knows what he is doing. He is the only other pilot aside from Amy to have an animal copilot in the dog Sola (ソラ, Sora) (Yūko Tachibana, Wendee Lee), who, like Luca, has her own commercial for dog food.

Bella Demarco (ベラ・ディマルコ, Bera Dimaruko)

Voiced by: Miyako Itō (Japanese); Stephanie Sheh (English)
Position: Midfielder
Nationality: (Switzerland) Switz
Age: 21
Gender: Female
Height: 155 cm
Weight: 42 kg
Bella Demarco is the midfielder for Team Edgeraid with an affinity for piercings. She comes up with good formations for her team to win. Bella seems to have romantic feelings towards rival pilot Takeshi Jin.

Franklin "Frank" Bullit (フランク・ブレット, Furanku Buretto)

Voiced by: Susumu Chiba (Japanese); Dave Wittenberg (English)
Position: Defender
Nationality: (Switzerland) Switz
Age: 23
Gender: Male
Height: 175 cm
Weight: 65 kg
Frank Bullit is the defender for Team Edgeraid. He likes to keep his opponents guessing and is sometimes off guard. He is always there for teamwork.

== Team Skylark ==
An all-female team from France. Team Skylark's machines are designed to maximize drafting techniques. The Skylark mechs are more of the aggressive melee type, where team members Elisa Doolittle and Jessica Darlin help protect team forward Fantine Valjean and use their special attack to take the lead after expending minimal energy for most of the race. Their mechs do not possess any kind of special weaponry or equipment except for extremely fast-moving arms, so the pilots focus mainly on their combat prowess. Their drafting techniques may also be out of necessity for their mech's safe handling, since Fantine's mech overheated during their first match with Team Satomi after trading blows with Takeshi for an extended period of time.

Fantine Valjean (ファンティーヌ・ヴァルジャン, Fantīnu Varujan)

Voiced by: Yui Horie (Japanese); Karen Strassman (English)
Position: Forward
Nationality: (France) French
Age: 17
Gender: Female
Height: 169 cm
Weight: 49 kg
Fantine is the forward and leader of Team Skylark. She is all about speed in the races and is unpredictable. She is considered the "princess" of her team and she seems to be attracted to Takeshi, who also plays Watch World. Takeshi and Fantine were in a relationship starting in Episode 7 and ending in Episode 19, when they broke up before the Satomi-Skylark race.

Jessica Darlin (ジェシカ・ダーリン, Jeshika Dārin)

Voiced by: Kiyomi Asai (Japanese); Kate Higgins (English)
Position: Midfielder
Nationality: (France) French
Age: 19
Gender: Female
Height: 187 cm
Weight: 64 kg
Jessica is the midfielder for Team Skylark and is very close to Fantine and respects what she wants. She also takes advice from Elissa during races and stops opponents alongside her.

Elissa Doolittle (エリサ・ドゥーリトル, Erisa Doūritoru)

Voiced by: Miho Hino (Japanese); Michelle Ruff (English)
Position: Defender
Age: 23
Gender: Female
Nationality: (France) French
Height: 185 cm
Weight: 60 kg
Elissa is the defender for Team Skylark and the oldest member. She makes a lot of decisions and gives guidance to Jessica. She also likes to watch as much as she competes.

== Team Sledge Mamma ==
Another team from the United States that frequently dominates the IGPX, Sledge Mamma is made up of Yamma, Timma, and Dimma, three legendary pilots who are 10-year veterans and notoriously merciless fighters, as well as former Satomi team member and rookie River Marque. The team despises the young upstarts of Team Satomi and will stop at nothing to put the rookies in their place on the field. Team Sledge Mamma apparently draws the line at cheating and actually hurting and harming people, as they once helped protect Team Satomi from an attack by overzealous Sledge Mamma fans. Team Sledge Mamma's mechs are armed with detachable fists connected by strands, which allows them to attack enemy mechs from a distance. In the microseries, Sledge Mamma is cybernetically enhanced.

Yamma (ヤマー, Yamā)

Voiced by: Keiji Fujiwara (Japanese); Mark Hamill (English)
Position: Midfielder (Formerly Forward)
Nationality: (United States) American
Age: 31
Gender: Male
Height: 192 cm
Weight: 71 kg
Yamma was the forward of Team Sledge Mamma and its leader. He is considered one of the most formidable and intimidating pilots in the league. An ill-tempered man who is willing to use underhanded methods, he is also skilled in knife fighting. Later, it is shown that Yamma dislikes Takeshi because of his similarities to Cunningham. Yamma is revealed to be the oldest pilot in the IG-1, second only to Andrei, during his brief return while Amy was out due to injury.

Dimma (デマー, Demā)

Voiced by: Tomoyuki Shimura (Japanese); André Ware (English)
Position: Defender
Nationality: (United States) American
Age: 29
Gender: Male
Height: 205 cm
Weight: 120 kg
Dimma is an African-American and the defender for Team Sledge Mamma. He knows how to make himself look tough in every race and stays true to his character, but knows how strong his team is. Dimma also seems to cooperate well.

Timma (チマー, Chimā)

Voiced by: Tatsuhisa Suzuki (Japanese); Dave Wittenberg (English)
Position: Midfielder (former)
Nationality: (United States) American
Age: 29
Gender: Male
Height: Unknown
Weight: Unknown
Timma is the former midfielder for Team Sledge Mamma. He is loyal to his leader Yamma and had no objections when he was kicked off when River joined. However, Timma was a sharp midfielder during his tenure.

River Marque (リバー・マルケ, Ribā Maruke)

Voiced by: Kazuya Nakai (Japanese); Steve Staley (English)
Position: Forward (During their race against Satomi), Midfielder
Nationality: (Canada) Canadian
Age: 17
Gender: Male
Height: 181 cm
Weight: 65 kg
River is the new forward of Team Sledge Mamma and a rival to Takeshi. He used to be the back-up pilot for Team Satomi and was frustrated about being on the bench. River is an outspoken and pushy troublemaker, shown when he pushed Takeshi into a security machine during a confrontation in the hangar, locking them in for the night. River was offered to replace Liz as defender at one time, but he sought the forward position. He then decided to leave Team Satomi so that he could challenge Takeshi in a friendly rivalry rather than a hateful one.

== Team Velshtein ==
The members of Team Velshtein were last year's IGPX champions, having upset Sledge Mamma last year in the IG-1 of 2048. Their coach is Sir Hamgra (サー・ハムグラ, Sā Hamugura) (George Nakata, Kim Strauss), who coaches in a military fashion and was also responsible for the Rocket's success. The Velshtein mechs are specially designed to discharge a pulse that disrupts the air pressure and creates a high voltage tornado; this attack has been named the Indraga Mano or Ace up the Sleeve. In the commentary of the Season 1 DVD, it is stated that the word "Indraga Mano" is a made-up word created by the writers; as a result, they had to come up with a crafty translation for the English version, hence "Ace up the Sleeve". In the second season, the move was made illegal by the IGPX League, stating that it was starting to get unfair how richer teams were able to buy more expensive equipment than poorer teams such as Team Satomi. Their mechs are capable of gliding short distances through retractable small wing-like extensions. Aside from that, they are extremely skilled pilots, with mechs that have immense reserves of strength for conventional combat. As with all teams, each of the mechs have subtle differences between them, but it is harder to distinguish between the three Velshtein mechs since they are similar in body width, height and depth, as opposed to the Forward mechs and Midfielder Mechs being slimmer, and share the same characteristic twin forward-swept, gold armor plates on their shoulders.

Alex "Cunningham" Hume (アレックス・カニンガム, Arekkusu Kaningamu)

Voiced by: Shinichirō Miki (Japanese); Steven Blum (English)
Position: Forward
Nationality: (Germany) German
Age: 22
Gender: Male
Height: 189 cm
Weight: 75 kg
Alex "Cunningham" is Team Velshtein's forward and an idol to IGPX fans. He has had the MVP title for three years and is nicknamed "The Ghost" due to his style that intimidates opponents. He is later revealed to have been born into a rich family, but lived an empty life until the IGPX. He likes to stand in the track when no one is there because it pumps him up. Like Takeshi, Cunningham is skilled in swordsmanship, but uses fencing. His mech is distinguishable from the other Velshtein mechs through its head and singular, back-swept armor plate on its arms.

Jan Michel (ジャン・マイケル, Jan Maikeru)

Voiced by: Kiyotaka Furushima (Japanese); Dave Wittenberg (English)
Position: Midfielder
Nationality: (France) French
Age: 21
Gender: Male
Height: 183 cm
Weight: 75 kg
Jan Michel is the midfielder for Team Velshtein. Although aware of the risks of Team Satomi, he still believes that his team is the best. His mech is distinguishable from the other two mechs by its shorter stature and the prominent white cylinder-like protrusion on its gold-plated head.

Dew (デュー, Dyū)

Voiced by: Yūto Kazama (Japanese); Lex Lang (English)
Position: Defender
Nationality: (Spain) Spanish
Age: 21
Gender: Male
Height: 183 cm
Weight: 77 kg
Dew is the defender for Team Velshtein and an observer, who observes team plays and reports that information to his team to give them an edge. He seems to be able to pay attention to minor details. His mech is distinguishable by the triangular-like armor plates on its arms, which can spin to add a devastating edge to Dew's blows.

== Team White Snow ==
A team that replaces Team Black Egg in Season 2 after Black Egg finished in last place during the first season. They started in the same place as Team Satomi did in Season 1, advancing from the IG-2 to attempt to become IG-1 champions. Their mechs have the ability to hack into enemy mechs and take control of their systems, which requires physical contact with the other mech and was banned by the IGPX League after it was used against Team Satomi. In their first match against Satomi, they score a resounding victory by taking control of the Satomi mechs and forcing them to attack each other. After Amy's mech is destroyed from the waist down by Takeshi's mech, controlled by Zanak, she is hospitalized and suspended from the next two races: Satomi vs Velshtein and Satomi vs Skylark. Team White Snow tends to sabotage or spy on Team Satomi by hacking into their computer systems to memorize their plays. Team White Snow can also combine their mechs into "Snowman", a large behemoth with many extended, spiked arms that is designed to prevent the other team from passing them on the track.

Zanak Strauss (ザナック・ストラウス, Zanakku Sutorausu)

Voiced by: Kenta Miyake (Japanese); Doug Erholtz (English)
Position: Forward
Nationality: (Australia) Australian
Age: 17
Gender: Male
Height: 172 cm
Weight: 65 kg
Zanak is the one-eyed forward of Team White Snow. He believes in preparation for everything, even if cheating is involved. He is concerned for his teammates' well-being, and, like Takeshi, is skilled in kendo. He is not the leader of this team, which is different from other teams having their Forward as the Team Leader.

Judy Ballasteros (ジュディー・ハイスミス, Judī Haisumisu)

Voiced by: Kotono Mitsuishi (Japanese); Megan Hollingshead (English)
Position: Defender
Nationality: (United States) American
Age: 18
Gender: Female
Height: 171 cm
Weight: 58 kg
Known as Judy Raysmith in Japan, she is the hardworking defender for Team White Snow. She is casual in her ways and is close with her teammate Zanak. She is still herself and will use others in that way.

Maxine "Max" Erlich (マックス・エルリック, Makkusu Erurikku)

Voiced by: Chika Fujimura (Japanese); Mela Lee (English)
Position: Midfielder
Nationality: (Norway) Norwegian
Age: 13
Gender: Female
Height: 149 cm
Weight: 39 kg
Max is the shy and reserved midfielder for Team White Snow, who tends to communicate through computers. Max is loyal to her team and would even cheat for them. Towards the end of the series, it is revealed that Max is a child prodigy and master programmer, having been learning C++ and running her own company when she was a child. She hacked into government servers and disappeared when they threatened to arrest her. Max was responsible for orchestrating Satomi's troubles as a way for her to understand Takeshi's tactics and find out if she had what it takes to beat him, hinting she might have a crush on him. In the final episode, she is revealed to be the actual leader of Team White Snow.

== Other characters ==
Benjamin Bright

Voiced by: Tadashi Miyazawa (Japanese); Tom Kenny (English)
As the "voice of IGPX" announcer, Benjamin Bright has become world famous for his color commentary on the sport. He slowly develops a grudging appreciation for the untested rookies of Team Satomi. Though rarely seen in person, Bright can often be seen giving race commentary and IGPX news on the various public TV screens scattered around the city and on the trademark blimp that hovers above the track.

== Rules of the IGPX ==
An IGPX race consists of two teams of three pilots: a forward (usually places first or second), a midfielder (usually places third or fourth), and a defender (usually places fifth or sixth). They compete on a 60-mile (97 km) track, going at speeds upwards of 400 mph (640 km/h). The overall objective is to make it to the finish line and accumulate more points than the opponent. 1st place receives 15 points; 2nd receives 7 points; 3rd gets 5 points; 4th gets 3 points; 5th gets 2 points and 6th gets 1 point. No points are awarded to pilots who are unable to finish the race. Any pilot who injures an opponent or the opponent's teammate(s) and causes their hospitalization or hacks into the opposing team's mechs will get the cheating pilot's team disqualified or banned; this did not happen to Team White Snow for some reason, despite them causing Amy's injury.

Lap one is a "setup" lap, in which teams set up their positions on the track and troubleshoot any problems that the mechs have. In the second lap, also known as the "battle round", the teams fight their way to the finish line. The pit machines, also known as the "running skeletons", are only employed during this lap. Each skeleton is designed to hold two people, one being the mechanic that fixes the mech, and has an open center that allows the mech to be held between the two cockpits while the parts for each mech are stored along the sides for quick replacement. However, the running skeleton can only be called on once for each team throughout the race. In the third lap, pilots are allowed to set their mechs into Speed Mode, which allows the mech to achieve maximum speed. In the semi-finale of the second season of IGPX, both Team Velshtein and Team Satomi did not activate Speed Mode. They just kept fighting until one goes down.

Usually, each IGPX season has the champion of the IG-2 brought in to replace the lowest ranking team in the standings. However, sometimes it grows to more teams, usually when there is controversy like in Team Satomi's second year in the IG-1. This allows the teams at the top to stay there while promoting the top two teams to the top league, and for IG-1 and basic structures to remain the same while avoiding as much controversy as possible. Which team Team Satomi replaced is unclear, but at the end of the first half of the series, Team Black Egg placed last in the IG-1 standings and was demoted from IG-1 to IG-2, with Team White Snow replacing them in the second half of the show.
