= Jan D'Alquen and Ron Eveslage =

Cinematography duo

Jan D'Alquen and Ron Eveslage are American cinematographers best known for their work with film director George Lucas on 1973's American Graffiti.

American Graffiti is a portrait of teenage life in 1962 which spawned numerous imitations such as the TV series Happy Days and films like The Lords of Flatbush. The budget of American Graffiti was a $750,000, and it had a 28-day shooting schedule. The film grossed more than $55 million, making it a blockbuster.

American Graffiti was shot entirely on location in small Northern California towns between the cruising hours of 9:00 p.m., when it was just dark enough, and 5:00 a.m., before the sun would come up. The crew experienced hardships on the low-budget shoot, including difficulties with lighting the set and having to contend with the extreme Northern California cold during the continuous night shoot. Lucas has said that it was a hectic shoot and that he had felt rushed by the tight schedule. According to Lucas, a typical night on the set was one when the assistant cameraman had to be hospitalized after he was run over by one of the cars and then the crew would have to put out a five-alarm fire.

== Filmography ==
- American Graffiti (1973)
- It Ain't Easy (1972)
