= It Ain't Easy (film) =

1972 film directed by Maurice Hurley

- Directed by: Maury Hurley
- Written by: Mary Olson
- Produced by: Richard A. Diercks
- Starring: Lance Henriksen; Barra Grant; Bill Moor
- Cinematography: Jan D'Alquen and Ron Eveslage
- Edited by: Lyle McIntyre
- Music by: Dale Menten
- Production company: Dandelion Productions
- Release date: November 10, 1972
- Running time: 90 minutes
- Country: United States
- Language: English

It Ain't Easy (also known as Into the Storm and The Winnipeg Run) is a 1972 American film, starring Lance Henriksen, Barra Grant, and Bill Moor.
