= Modesto American Graffiti Festival =

Festival in Modesto, California

Modesto American Graffiti Festival & Car Show
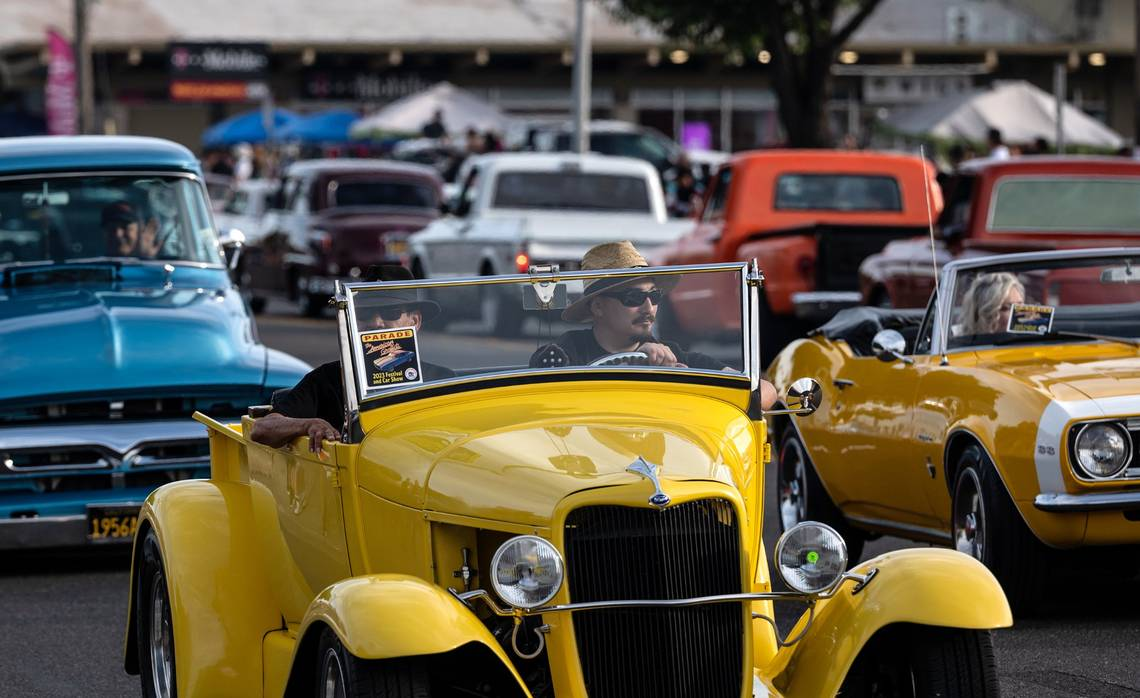
- Status: active
- Genre: Cultural festival and classic car show
- Begins: June 7, 2025
- Ends: June 8, 2025
- Frequency: Annually
- Location: Modesto, California
- Country: United States
- Years active: 26–27
- Inaugurated: 1999
- Organizer: Kiwanis Club of North Modesto

The Modesto American Graffiti Festival & Car Show is a cultural festival and classic car show that takes place in Modesto, California. Organized by the Kiwanis Club of North Modesto, the festival has occurred annually since 1999, making summer 2024 the 25th anniversary.

== Description ==
The Kiwanis Club advertises that the festival includes, "hundreds of classic cars, live entertainment on stage, and dozens of food vendors and others displaying and selling crafts, car specialty items, and more." The car cruise takes place in the evening and the cars travel through downtown Modesto and McHenry Avenue. All proceeds from the festival are returned to the community.

== History ==
American Graffiti, the a 1973 American coming-of-age comedy-drama film directed by George Lucas, takes place in Modesto. The city is George Lucas' hometown and the film depicts his life cruising Modesto as a teenager. Teens used to cruise in their cars through downtown Modesto and McHenry avenue, with the Burge’s Restaurant being the turnaround point. The American Graffiti Festival is an event which has its roots in this cultural history of the city. In 2016, there were 1,300 cars in the showing.

In 1988, Wolfman Jack made his first appearance at the Modesto car show.
