= Lance Henriksen =

American actor (born 1940)

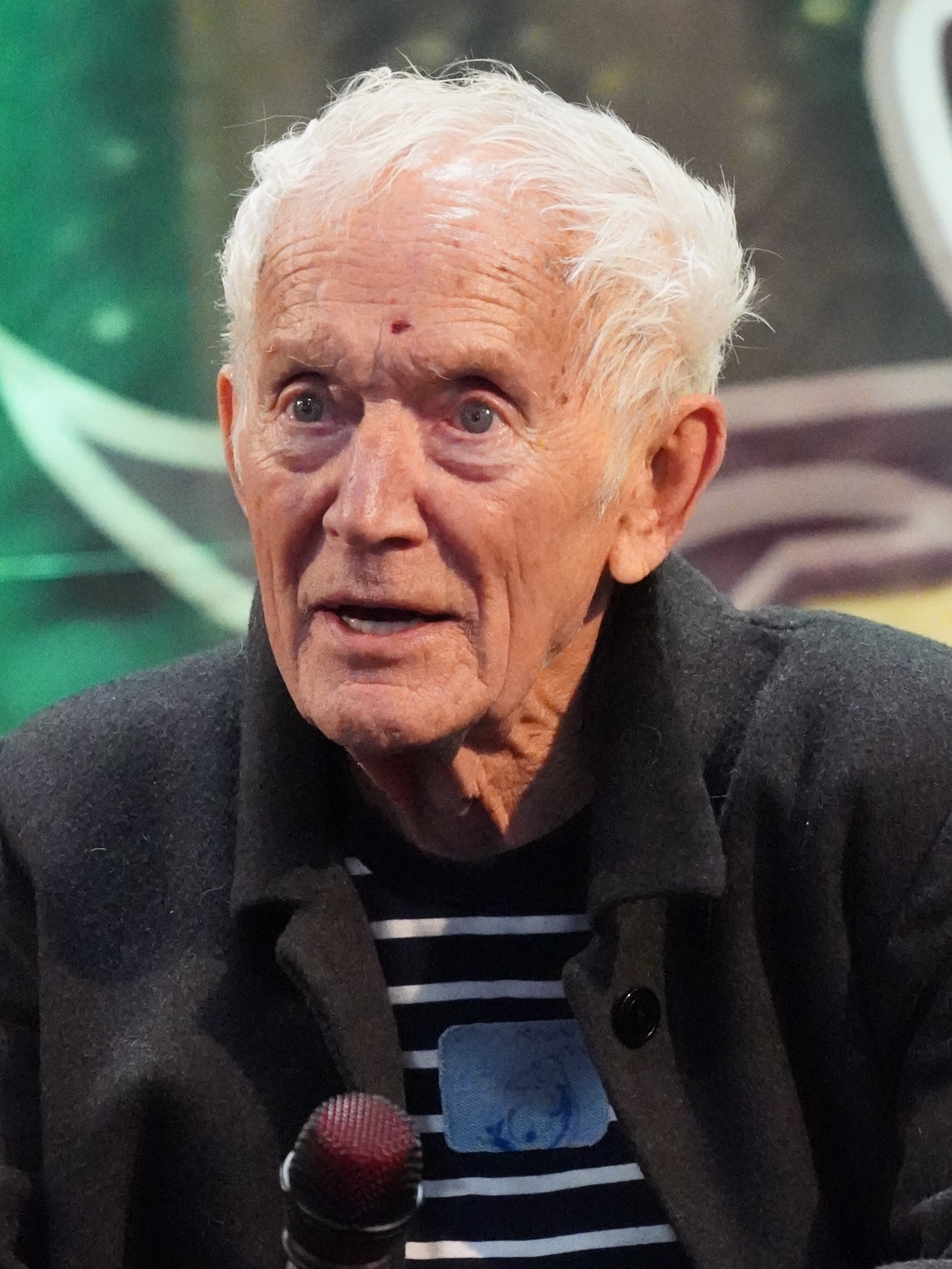
- Henriksen at the 2025 Comiccon France
- Born: May 5, 1940 (age 86); New York City, U.S.
- Occupation: Actor
- Years active: 1961–present
- Spouses: Mary Jane Evans (m. 1985; div. 1989) Jane Pollack (m. 1995; div. 2006) Louise Lunde (m. 2006)
- Children: 2

Lance Henriksen (born May 5, 1940) is an American actor. He is known for his roles in various science fiction, action and horror genre productions, including Bishop in the Alien film franchise and Frank Black in the television series Millennium (1996–99) and The X-Files (1999).

Other film credits include The Right Stuff (1983), The Terminator (1984), Pumpkinhead (1988), Stone Cold (1991), Hard Target (1993), Color of Night (1994), The Quick and the Dead (1995), Powder (1995), Scream 3 (2000), When a Stranger Calls (2006), Appaloosa (2008), and Falling (2020).

He has also done extensive voice work, including the Disney film Tarzan (1999) and the video games Gun (2005), Call of Duty: Modern Warfare 2 (2009) and BioWare's Mass Effect trilogy (2007–2012).

Henriksen was nominated for three Golden Globe Awards for his role on Millennium, and won a Saturn Award (out of four total nominations) for his performance in Hard Target. In 2021, he was nominated for a Canadian Screen Award for Best Actor for Falling.

== Early life ==
Henriksen was born on May 5, 1940 in Manhattan, New York. His father, James Henriksen, was a Norwegian merchant sailor and boxer, who spent most of his life at sea, while his mother, Margueritte Werner, struggled to find work as a dance instructor, waitress and model. His parents divorced when he was two years old, and his mother struggled to raise him and his half-brother Walter, leading to his spending part of his childhood in foster care. During an interview, Henriksen recounted how, at the age of seven, his mother handed him his birth certificate and said, "You'll always know who you are", then pushed him out of his home. Henriksen did not actually leave home until he was 12, saying he'd "had enough" of his home life, and that he had been physically assaulted by multiple maternal family members: "I got bludgeoned a lot. Different people, relatives. I remember every single face from my childhood. My alcoholic uncles, whoever. I'm not having a pity party here; I'm not Quasimodo. That's just how it was". On another occasion, two of his uncles tried to persuade him to take Methadrine and then take part in a staged car accident for the insurance money.

Growing up, Henriksen had a reputation for getting into trouble in the various schools he attended, and even spent time in a children's home. He left school after completing first grade, and was illiterate until the age of 30.

== Career ==
Henriksen found work as a muralist and as a laborer on ships. For a time, he worked in Europe. Around age 30, he found theater work as a set designer, and he received his first acting role because he built the set for a production. It was around this time that he taught himself to read. For his first role, he put the entire script on tape with the help of a friend, then learned his part and all of the others. Soon afterward, he graduated from the Actors Studio and began acting in New York City.

Henriksen's first film appearance was in The Outsider in 1961, as an uncredited extra. He received his first credit in his second film, 1972's It Ain't Easy. He auditioned for the role of Leon Shermer in Dog Day Afternoon (1975), but received the smaller part of an FBI agent that kills John Cazale's character. He appeared in two more films directed by Sidney Lumet: Network (1976) and Prince of the City (1981). In a 2009 interview, Henriksen called Lumet "the kind of guy that loves New York actors, because that's where he works and that's what he knows....He would give you the job that was maybe only meant for four days, and he'd give you the run of the show because he wanted to help support young actors in New York."

Henriksen had supporting roles in a variety of films, including the science-fiction film Close Encounters of the Third Kind (1977) and the horror film Damien - Omen II (1978). He also had co-starring roles in the low-budget horror film Mansion of the Doomed (1976) and the Italian-produced science fiction film The Visitor (1979). He played Police Chief Steve Kimbrough in Piranha Part Two: The Spawning (1982), the astronaut Walter Schirra in The Right Stuff (1983), actor Charles Bronson in the television film Reason for Living: The Jill Ireland Story (1991), and a cameo appearance as The King in Super Mario Bros. (1993).

When James Cameron was writing The Terminator (1984), he originally envisioned Henriksen, with whom he had worked on Piranha II, as playing the title role, a cyborg. The role ultimately went to Arnold Schwarzenegger. Henriksen does appear in the film as Hal Vukovich, a Detective in the Los Angeles Police Department.

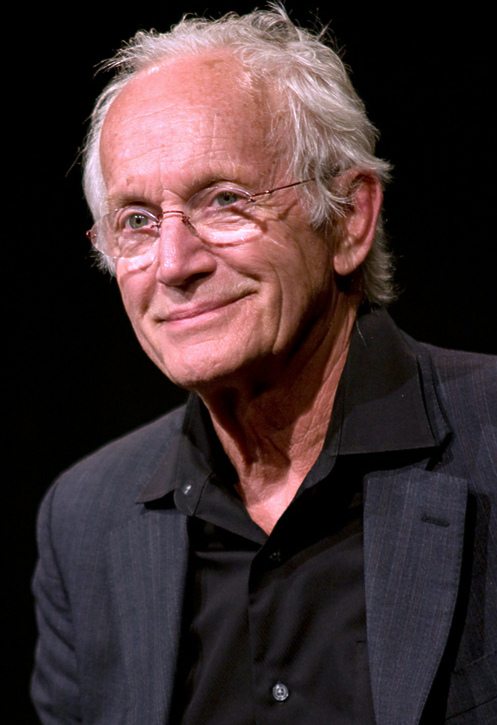
Henriksen in 2010

Henriksen played the android Bishop in Cameron's film Aliens (1986), and as Bishop's designer Michael Weyland in Alien 3 (1992). He also played Charles Bishop Weyland, the man upon whom Bishop was based, in Alien vs. Predator (2004). Bill Paxton and Henriksen are the only actors whose characters were killed by the Terminator, the Alien, and the Predator. He played the vampire leader Jesse Hooker in Kathryn Bigelow's cult film Near Dark.

He portrayed gunfighters in the Westerns Dead Man and The Quick and the Dead, and appeared with British actor Bruce Payne in Aurora: Operation Intercept in 1995. That year, he also played Sheriff Doug Barnum in the film Powder. He appeared with Payne again in Face the Evil (1997), and the dystopian classic Paranoia 1.0 (2004).

In 1996, Henriksen starred in the television series Millennium, created and produced by Chris Carter, the creator of The X-Files. Henriksen played Frank Black, a former FBI agent who possessed a unique ability to see into the minds of killers. Carter created the role specifically for the actor. His performances on Millennium earned him critical acclaim, a People's Choice Award nomination for Favorite New Male TV Star, and three consecutive Golden Globe nominations for Best Performance by an Actor in a TV Series (1997–1999). The series was canceled in 1999. On television, Henriksen appeared in the ensemble of Into the West (2005), a miniseries executive-produced by Steven Spielberg. He appeared in a Brazilian soap opera, Caminhos do Coração (Ways of the Heart) from Rede Record, aired in 2007–2008. Henriksen guest-starred on a NCIS season 6 episode of NCIS (2009) playing an Arizona sheriff, and appeared in a recurring role as The Major on NBC's The Blacklist.

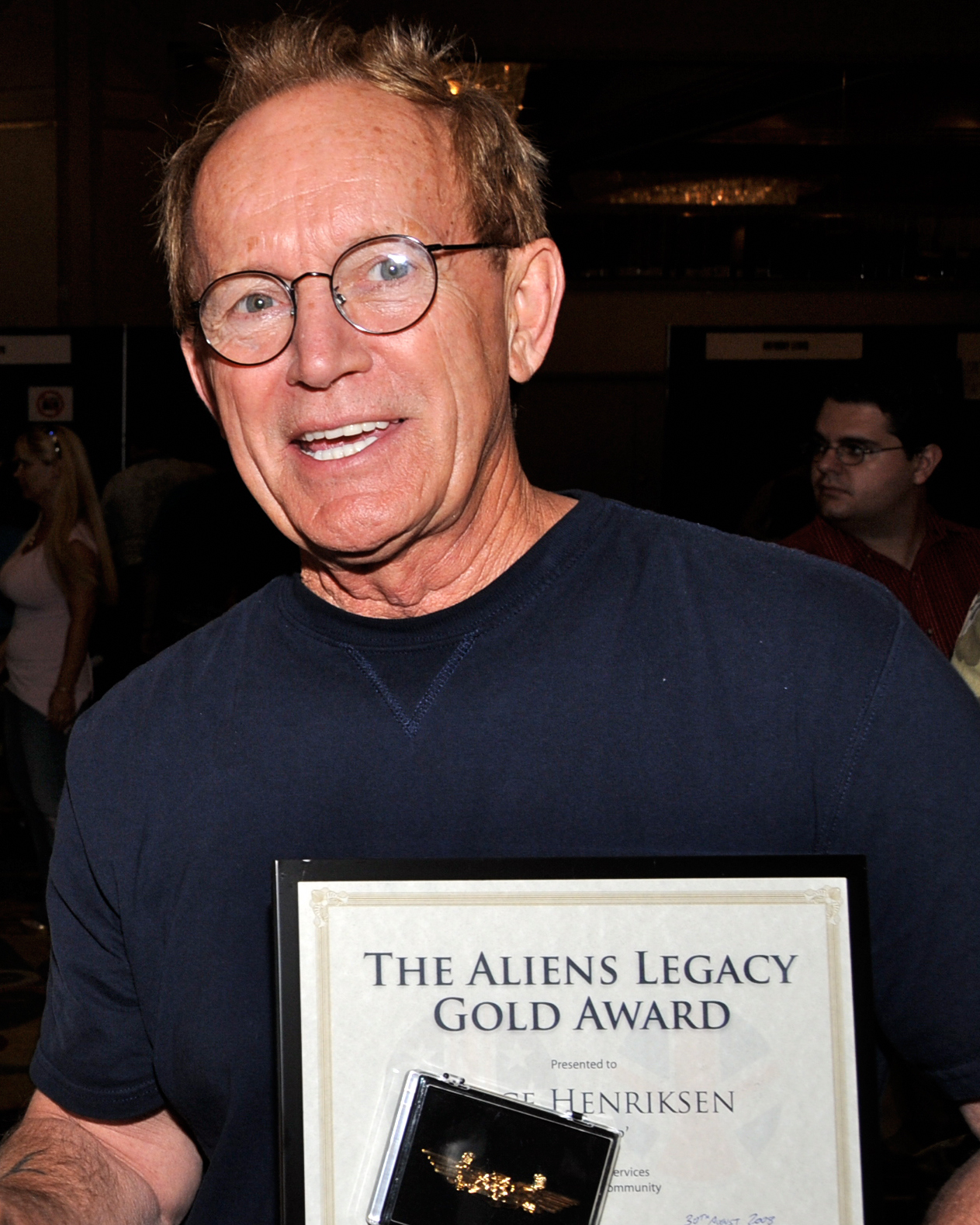
Henriksen receiving the Aliens Legacy Gold Award at Dragon Con 2008, Atlanta, Georgia

In the years after Millennium, Henriksen has become an active voice actor, lending his distinctive voice to a number of animated features and video game titles. In Disney's Tarzan (1999) and its direct-to-video followup, he is Kerchak, the ape who serves as Tarzan's surrogate father. He provided the voice for the alien supervillain Brainiac in Superman: Brainiac Attacks (2006) and for the character Mulciber in Godkiller (2009). Henriksen is the voice of the character Molov in the video game Red Faction II (2002) and has also contributed to GUN (2005), Run Like Hell (2002), the canceled title Four Horsemen of the Apocalypse (2004), and the role-playing game Mass Effect (2007) as Admiral Hackett of the Human Systems Alliance. Henriksen was also the voice behind PlayStation 3's internet promotional videos.

In 2005, Henriksen was the voice of Andrei Rublev in Cartoon Network's IGPX. The actor lent his voice to the animated television series Transformers: Animated as the character Lockdown. In 2009, Henriksen voiced Lieutenant General Shepherd in the award-winning game Call of Duty: Modern Warfare 2. He later provided the voice Karl Bishop Weyland in Aliens vs. Predator; also, this character's appearance resembles Henriksen's. Henriksen voiced Master Gnost-Dural in Star Wars: The Old Republic, and he also reprised his role as Admiral Hackett in Mass Effect 3. Henriksen reprised his role as Bishop in Aliens: Colonial Marines.

He starred in a 2003 series of Australian television commercials for Visa, titled Unexplained (about the raining of fish from the sky over Norfolk) and Big Cats (about the Beast of Bodmin Moor). In these commercials, Henriksen speaks as a Frank Black-type character about these phenomena as Mark Snow-inspired mysterious music plays in the background, as a link to Henriksen's TV series Millennium. Unexplained went on to a gold world medal at the 2004 New York Festivals.

He made a cameo appearance in the 2009 horror comedy Jennifer's Body, and starred in the After Dark Horrorfest film Scream of the Banshee, released in 2011. He played Henry Gale in Leigh Scott's The Witches of Oz.

In January 2015, he was signed for the lead in the indie thriller Monday at 11:01 am In 2016, he starred in the feature film Deserted, a psychological thriller. Henriksen played the role of Hopper.

In 2018, Henriksen performed motion capture and vocal performance for the character of Carl Manfred in the video game Detroit: Become Human. The game's plot involves androids gaining sentience and free will, topics explored briefly with Henriksen's Bishop character in Aliens.

In October 2018, Henriksen was signed for one of the two leads in Falling, the directorial debut of actor Viggo Mortensen, who also wrote, produced and co-starred. Reviewing the film's 2020 premiere, The Hollywood Reporter's John DeFore noted not only the quality of Henriksen's performance, but the opportunity Mortensen's script presented: "[F]ew moviegoers who've enjoyed him over the years will be surprised, but many will resent that we, and he, have waited so long for a role like this."

He received a Canadian Screen Award nomination for Best Actor at the 9th Canadian Screen Awards in 2021, for his performance in Falling.

In 2022, Henriksen was cast in the upcoming American horror film, Awaken the Reaper. The film is currently shooting in New York and slated for a 2024 release date. It is directed by Justin Paul and Dave Campfield and produced by Fourth Horizon Cinema, Impact Media Studios and Design Weapons.

== Personal life ==
Henriksen was working with potter Joan Stone doing his pottery in her studio during the early 1970s. Henriksen has been married twice. He was married to Mary Jane Evans from 1985 to 1989 and to Jane Pollack from 1995 to 2006.

Henriksen has one child from each marriage.

=== Art ===
Henriksen continues to produce art. He worked as a muralist before he became an actor, and he has worked with clay since 1960. In September 2017, Henriksen set up a website to showcase and find homes for some of his most recent clay works. He "still believes that there is nothing as simple and beautiful as raw clay... And that Potters have the remaining soul of the nomads...always searching...".

== Filmography ==
=== Film ===
Year	Film	Role	Notes
1961	The Outsider	U.S. Marine	Uncredited
1972	It Ain't Easy	Randy	
1973	Emperor of the North	Railroad Worker	Uncredited
1974	To Kill the King	Hank Adams	
1975	Dog Day Afternoon	FBI Agent Murphy	
1976	Mansion of the Doomed	Dr. Dan Bryan	
1976	Network	Network Lawyer at Khan's Place	Uncredited
1976	The Next Man	Federal Security	
1977	Close Encounters of the Third Kind	Robert	
1978	Damien - Omen II	Sergeant Neff	
1979	The Visitor	Raymond Armstead	
1981	The Dark End of the Street	Jimmy	
1981	Piranha II: The Spawning	Police Chief Steve Kimbrough	
1981	Prince of the City	District Attorney Burano	
1983	Nightmares	MacLeod	
1983	The Right Stuff	Wally Schirra	
1984	The Terminator	Detective Hal Vukovich	
1985	Jagged Edge	Frank Martin	
1985	Savage Dawn	Stryker	
1986	Aliens	Bishop	
1986	On Dangerous Ground	Brook Alastair	
1987	Near Dark	Jesse Hooker	
1988	Pumpkinhead	Ed Harley	
1988	Survival Quest	Hank Chambers	
1988	Deadly Intent	Raymond	
1989	The Horror Show	Detective Lucas McCarthy	
1989	Johnny Handsome	Rafe Garrett	
1989	Hit List	Chris Caleek	
1990	The Last Samurai	Johnny Congo	
1991	The Pit and the Pendulum	Tomas de Torquemada	
1991	Stone Cold	"Chains" Cooper	
1992	Jennifer 8	Sergeant Freddy Ross	
1992	Alien 3	Bishop	
1992	Alien 3	Michael Weyland, Bishop's creator	Listed in credits as "Bishop II"
1992	Comrades in Arms	Rob Reed	
1992	Delta Heat	Jackson Rivers	
1993	Excessive Force	Captain Raymond Devlin	
1993	Super Mario Bros.	The King (Note: Identified as "Bowser" in production notes, and "Reznor" in comic continuation.)	Cameo appearance
1993	Man's Best Friend	Dr. Jarret	
1993	Hard Target	Emil Fouchon	
1993	The Outfit	Dutch Schultz	
1993	Knights	Job The Cyborg	
1993	The Criminal Mind	Agent Winslow	
1994	No Escape	The Father	
1994	Color of Night	Buck	
1994	Boulevard	McClaren	
1994	Felony	Taft	
1995	Aurora: Operation Intercept	William Stenghel	
1995	The Quick and the Dead	"Ace" Hanlon	
1995	Dead Man	Cole Wilson	
1995	Powder	Sheriff Doug Barnum	
1995	Mind Ripper	Dr. Jim Stockton	a.k.a. The Outpost
1995	The Nature of the Beast	Jack Powell	Direct-to-video
1997	Dusting Cliff 7	Colonel Roger McBride	Direct-to-video, a.k.a. Last Assassins
1997	Gunfighter's Moon	Frank Morgan	Direct-to-video
1997	No Contest II	Eric Dane / Erich Dengler	Direct-to-video
1999	Tarzan	Kerchak	Voice
2000	Scream 3	John Milton	
2002	The Mangler 2	Headmaster Bradeen	Direct-to-video
2002	The Untold	Harlan Knowles	Direct-to-video, a.k.a. Sasquatch
2002	Unspeakable	Jack Pitchford	Direct-to-video
2003	Antibody	Dr. Richard Gaynes	Direct-to-video
2003	Mimic 3: Sentinel	Garbageman	Direct-to-video
2004	Modigliani	Foster Kane	
2004	Madhouse	Dr. Franks	Direct-to-video
2004	Alien vs. Predator	Charles Bishop Weyland	
2004	Dream Warrior	Parish	
2004	Starkweather	The Mentor	Direct-to-video
2004	Out for Blood	Captain John Billings	Direct-to-video
2004	Paranoia 1.0	Howard	Direct-to-video, a.k.a. One Point O
2005	Tarzan II	Kerchak	Voice, direct-to-video
2005	Hellraiser: Hellworld	The Host	Direct-to-video
2006	When a Stranger Calls	The Stranger	Voice
2006	The Garden	Ben Zachary	Direct-to-video
2006	Abominable	Ziegler Dane	Direct-to-video
2006	Sasquatch Mountain	Chase Jackson	Direct-to-video
2006	The Da Vinci Treasure	Dr. John Coven	Direct-to-video
2006	Superman: Brainiac Attacks	Brainiac	Voice
2006	Pirates of Treasure Island	Long John Silver	Direct-to-video
2007	Bone Dry	Jimmy	Direct-to-video
2007	The Chosen One	Cardinal Fred	Voice, direct-to-video
2008	Deadwater	Colonel John Willets	Direct-to-video, a.k.a. Black Ops
2008	Dying God	Chance	Direct-to-video
2008	Dark Reel	Connor Pritchett	
2008	Appaloosa	Ring Shelton	
2008	Necessary Evil	Dr. Fibrian	Direct-to-video
2008	Pistol Whipped	The Old Man	Direct-to-video
2008	Prairie Fever	Monte James	Direct-to-video
2008	Alone in the Dark II	Abner Lundbert	Direct-to-video
2008	Adventures in Voice Acting	Himself	Documentary
2009	Screamers: The Hunting	Orsow	Direct-to-video
2009	The Slammin' Salmon	Dick Lobo	
2009	The Seamstress	Sheriff Virgil Logan	Direct-to-video
2009	Jennifer's Body	Passing Motorist	Cameo
2009	Nightmares in Red, White and Blue	Himself	Voice
2010	Cyrus	Emmett	
2010	The Lost Tribe	Gallo	Direct-to-video
2010	The Genesis Code	Dr. Hoffer	Direct-to-video
2010	Godkiller: Walk Among Us	Mulciber	Voice
2010	Scream of the Banshee	Broderick Duncan	Direct-to-video
2010	The Penitent Man	Mr. Darnell	Direct-to-video
2011	Good Day for It	Lyle Tyrus	Direct-to-video
2011	Monster Brawl	God	Voice
2011	The Arcadian	Father Reed	Direct-to-video
2012	Astronaut: The Last Push	Walter Moffitt	Direct-to-video
2012	Beautiful Wave	Jimmy Davenport / Baja Man	Direct-to-video
2012	My Dog the Champion	Billy	Direct-to-video
2012	It's in the Blood	Sheriff Russell	Direct-to-video
2013	Gemini Rising	Colonel Stephen Cencula	a.k.a. Alien Rising
2013	Gingerclown	Braineater	Voice
2013	The Book of Daniel	Cyrus the Great	Direct-to-video
2013	Phantom	Commodore Vladimir Markov	
2014	Road to Paloma	FBI Agent Joe Kelly	
2014	Dark Awakening	Father Donovan O'Malley	
2014	The Sector	Shadow Man	Direct-to-video
2014	Hollows Grove	Bill	Direct-to-video
2014	Garm Wars: The Last Druid	Wydd 256	Direct-to-video
2015	Harbinger Down	Graff	Direct-to-video, a.k.a. Inanimate
2015	Fragile Storm	Norman	Short film
2015	Kids vs Monsters	Heinrich	Direct-to-video
2015	Stung	Mayor Caruthers	Direct-to-video
2015	Spirit Riders	Rex	Direct-to-video
2016	Monday at 11:01 A.M.	The Bartender	Direct-to-video
2016	The Hamster	The Narrator	Short film
2016	Cut to the Chase	The Man	Direct-to-video
2016	Daylight's End	Chief Frank Hill	Direct-to-video
2016	Deserted	Hopper	Direct-to-video
2016	The Sector	The Finisher	Direct-to-video
2016	After the Sun Fell	Dicky	Direct-to-video
2016	Gehenna: Where Death Lives	Morgan	Direct-to-video
2016	The Unwilling	Father Harris	Direct-to-video
2016	Lake Eerie	Pop	Direct-to-video
2017	Needlestick	Alexander Crick	Direct-to-video
2017	Mom and Dad	Mel Ryan	
2018	West of Hell	The Devil	
2018	Big Legend	Jackson Wells	
2018	Gone Are the Days	Taylon Flynn	
2018	A Reckoning	Henry Breck	
2018	D-Railed	Manny	
2018	Mimesis Nosferatu	The Auter	
2019	Cliffs of Freedom	Old Demetri	
2019	Her Mind in Pieces	Norman	
2019	Exorcism at 60,000 Feet	Captain Houdee	
2019	Eminence Hill	Mason Mills	
2019	Being	Reverend Campbell	
2020	Falling	Willis Peterson	
2020	A Place Among the Dead	L	
2021	The Unhealer	Reverend Stanley Pflueger	
2021	The Dead of Night	Earl	
2021	Reklaw	Lott	Short
2021	Why?	Sheriff Logan	
2021	Alpha Rift	Corbin	
2021	Vote for Santa	Santa	
2022	Bring on the Dancing Horses		
2022	The Edge of Her Mind Anthology	Norman	
2022	The Artifice Girl	Elderly Gareth	
2023	When Jack Came Back	Barry Davis	
2023	On Fire	George Laughlin	
2024	Altered Reality	Jack	
2025	One	Pastor Jesse Davidson	
TBA	Awaken the Reaper	Deacon Tom	
TBA	Acre Beyond the Rye	Dr. Bradford Weeks	Post-production
TBA	Bring Me the Head of Lance Henriksen	Lance	Post-production; filmed in 2010

=== Television ===
Year	Title	Role	Notes
1980	B.A.D. Cats	Timothy	Pilot episode
1980	Ryan's Hope	Preston Post	8 episodes
1983	Cagney & Lacey	Johnny "Nose"	Episode: "Hopes and Dreams"
1983	Hardcastle and McCormick	Deseau	Episode: "Man in a Glass House"
1983	Blood Feud	Mel Pierce	Television film
1984	The A-Team	Mack Dalton	Episode: "In Plane Sight"
1984	Riptide	John McMasters	Episode: "Raiders of the Lost Sub"
1984	Legmen	Finch	Episode: "A Woman's Work"
1984	Cagney & Lacey	Sergeant King	Episode: "Heat"
1984	Hardcastle and McCormick	Josh Fulton	Episode: "Never My Love"
1985	Streets of Justice	D.A. Jerry Logan	made-for-television movie
1989	Beauty and the Beast	"Snow"	Episode: "Snow"
1990–1991	Tales from the Crypt	Reno Crevice / Sergeant Ripper	2 episodes
1996–1999	Millennium	Frank Black	67 episodes
1998	The Day Lincoln Was Shot	Abraham Lincoln	Television film
1999	The X-Files	Frank Black	Episode: "Millennium"
1999	Harsh Realm	General	Pilot episode
2001	The Legend of Tarzan	Kerchak	Voice, episode: "Tarzan and Tublat's Revenge"
2001	Lost Voyage	David Shaw	Television film
2004	Static Shock	Kobra Leader	Voice, episode: "Future Shock"
2004	Evel Knievel	William "Awful" Knoffel	Television film
2005	Super Robot Monkey Team Hyperforce Go!	Mobius Quint	Voice, episode: "Hunt for the Citadel of Bone"
2005	Into the West	Daniel Wheeler	Episode: "Hell on Wheels"
2005	IGPX: Immortal Grand Prix	Andrei Rublev	Voice
2005	Supernova	Colonel Harlan Williams	Television film
2006	Pumpkinhead: Ashes to Ashes	Ed Harley	Television film
2007	Pumpkinhead: Blood Feud	Ed Harley	Television film
2007	In the Spider's Web	Dr. Lecorpus	Television film
2007	Caminhos do Coração	Dr. Walker	6 episodes
2008	DEA	The Narrator	Voice
2008	Ladies of the House	Frank Olmstead	Television film
2008–2009	Transformers: Animated	Lockdown	Voice, 3 episodes
2009	NCIS	Sheriff Clay Boyd	Episode: "South by Southwest"
2010	The Avengers: Earth's Mightiest Heroes	Grim Reaper	Voice, 4 episodes
2010	Castle	Benny Stryker	Episode: "Close Encounters of the Murderous Kind"
2011	The Witches of Oz	Henry Gale	2 episodes
2011	Memphis Beat	Tom Harrison	Episode: "The Feud"
2011	The Dog Who Saved Halloween	Professor Eli Cole	Television film
2012–2013	Tron: Uprising	Tesler	Voice, 16 episodes
2012	The Legend of Korra	Lieutenant	Voice, 7 episodes
2013	Hannibal	Lawrence Wells	Episode: "Trou Normand"
2014	The Strain	The Narrator	Voice, episode: "Night Zero"
2014–2017	All Hail King Julien	Doc Sugarfoot	Voice, episode: "Election"
2015–2016	The Blacklist	The Major / Bill McCready	4 episodes
2015	Teenage Mutant Ninja Turtles	Zog	Voice, episode: "Dinosaur Seen in Sewers!"
2015–2017	Into the Badlands	Penrith	3 episodes
2016	Grey's Anatomy	Griffin McColl	Episode: "Odd Man Out"
2016	Criminal Minds	Chazz Montolo	Episode: "A Beautiful Disaster"
2016	The Night Shift	Clive	2 episodes
2016	Legends of Tomorrow	Obsidian	Episode: "Compromised"
2017	The Machine	Stanley	Voice, television film
2018–2020	Rapunzel's Tangled Adventure	Baron	Voice, 2 episodes
2020	New Looney Tunes	Ironbootay	Voice, episode: "Undercover Bunny"
2020	Better Things	Virgil	Episode: "She's Fifty"
2020	Big Dogs	Totentatz	2 episodes
2023	Rabbit Hole	Crowley	Episode 8: Ace in The Hole
2023	Aqua Teen Hunger Force	Vannesa	Episode: "Anubis"

=== Voice work ===
Year	Title	Role	Notes	Ref.
2019	Alien III	Bishop		

=== Video games ===
Year	Title	Role	Notes
2002	Run Like Hell	Nick Conner	
2002	Red Faction II	Molov	
2002–2004	Four Horsemen of the Apocalypse	Abaddon	Cancelled
2005	Gun	Major Thomas Magruder	
2007	Mass Effect	Admiral Steven Hackett	
2008	Transformers Animated: The Game	Lockdown	
2009	The Chronicles of Riddick: Assault on Dark Athena	Max Dacher	
2009	Call of Duty: Modern Warfare 2	General Shepherd	
2010	Aliens vs. Predator	Karl Bishop Weyland	Voice and likeness
2011	Mass Effect 2: Arrival	Admiral Steven Hackett	
2011	Star Wars: The Old Republic	Jedi Master Gnost-Dural	
2012	Mass Effect 3	Admiral Steven Hackett	
2012	Infex	Hazelton	
2013	Aliens: Colonial Marines	Bishop	Voice and likeness
2013	Aliens: Colonial Marines	Michael Weyland	Voice and likeness
2018	Detroit: Become Human	Carl Manfred	Voice, performance capture, and likeness
2022	The Quarry	Jedediah Hackett	Voice, performance capture, and likeness

== Books ==
Autobiography

- Not Bad for a Human – The Life and Films of Lance Henriksen – Lance Henriksen with co-author Joseph Maddrey, published in 2011 by Bloody Pulp Books, featuring art by Bill Sienkiewicz, Mike Mignola, Tom Mandrake, Tim Bradstreet, Eric Powell and Ashley Wood.

Comic books

- To Hell You Ride (five-issue comic book from Dark Horse Comics) (2012) – Lance Henriksen and Joseph Maddrey (co-authors) with Tom Mandrake (artist); a motion-comic video was also made by Dark Horse Comics) (2012) – Lance Henriksen and Joseph Maddrey (co-authors), Tom Mandrake (artist), Lance Henriksen (narrator), TKU: Tecamachalco Underground (Cesar Gallegos/Mateo Latosa) (musical score)
