= Nightmares in Red, White and Blue =

2009 American documentary film

Nightmares in Red, White and Blue: The Evolution of the American Horror Film
- Promotional release poster
- Directed by: Andrew Monument
- Produced by: Joseph Maddrey
- Starring: Larry Cohen; Joe Dante; John Carpenter; Darren Lynn Bousman; Mick Garris; Tom McLoughlin; George A. Romero
- Narrated by: Lance Henriksen
- Production company: Lux Digital Pictures
- Release date: August 6, 2009
- Running time: 96 minutes
- Country: United States
- Language: English

Nightmares in Red, White and Blue: The Evolution of the American Horror Film is a 2009 American documentary film directed by Andrew Monument, based on the 2004 book of the same name by Joseph Maddrey. The film examines the appeal of the horror film genre to audiences and how the genre has continually evolved to reflect changing societal fears in the United States during the 20th and 21st centuries.

Nightmares in Red, White and Blue features interviews with such subjects as Larry Cohen, Joe Dante, John Carpenter, Darren Lynn Bousman, Mick Garris, Tom McLoughlin, and George A. Romero, and is narrated by Lance Henriksen. It has received generally positive reviews.

== Synopsis ==
The documentary mainly focuses on the evolution of the horror film genre in the United States, how horror films have adapted over time in accordance with the changing fears of the American public, and the connections between major events in the U.S. and the attraction that horror films have to moviegoing audiences. The film features interviews with a number of filmmakers, producers, and historians: Darren Lynn Bousman, John Carpenter, Larry Cohen, Joe Dante, Dennis Fischer, Mick Garris, Tom McLoughlin, John Kenneth Muir, George A. Romero, Roger Corman, Tony Timpone, and Brian Yuzna.

The silent era of film that thrived until the late 1920s is discussed, with connections being made between World War I soldiers returning home with deformities and films featuring disfigured humans as the antagonists, such as The Phantom of the Opera. With the dawn of the sound era, European filmmakers like James Whale adapted European horror literature for American audiences, as in the case of Frankenstein. However, by the advent of World War II and the Atomic Age, widespread paranoia about nuclear weapons gave birth to B movies of the 1950s like Tarantula and Creature with the Atom Brain.

It is stated that horror films of the 1960s and 1970s became more violent and sexually explicit, with films such as Night of the Living Dead, The Texas Chain Saw Massacre, and various exploitation films being used as examples. It is also noted that the horror film genre garnered mainstream recognition due to works like The Exorcist and Jaws. The horror subgenre of slasher films is then explored. Videodrome, The Stuff, and They Live are highlighted as satirizing consumerism, commercialism, and the rise of home video in the 1980s. Parallels are drawn between the charisma and actions of villain Freddy Krueger of the Nightmare on Elm Street franchise and former U.S. President Ronald Reagan.

Films featuring serial killers, like Henry: Portrait of a Serial Killer, The Silence of the Lambs, Se7en, and American Psycho, are raised as examples of works featuring disturbed but mortal and visually human characters, or "inversion[s] of the American Dreamer". Following the terrorist attacks of September 11, 2001, and the commencement of the Iraq War, it is stated that remakes like 2003's The Texas Chainsaw Massacre and 2004's Dawn of the Dead began to present their monsters as faster and more sadistic than ever before. The documentary concludes by restating the premise that American horror films reflect the fears of the American public, and adapt as history continues to be made.

== Critical reception ==
On review aggregator website Rotten Tomatoes, the film has an approval rating of 100% based on 7 reviews, with an average score of 7.8/10.

Dennis Harvey of Variety called the film a "comprehensive if uncritical overview of the U.S. horror genre", and notes that "while the focus is primarily on well-known titles and directors, the pic does take time to spotlight a few lesser-known gems, such as Bob Clark's Deathdream [...] and David Cronenberg's marvelous feature debut, Shivers, [...]; international horror, however, is just briefly touched on."

In 2019, Chris Coffel of Film School Rejects ranked Nightmares in Red, White and Blue #8 on his list of the "10 Best Horror Docs Every Horror Fan Should Watch", writing that it "does a wonderful job providing a high level overview of America's history with the genre." Meagan Navarro of Bloody Disgusting later wrote of the film that, "for an introductory social and history lesson on horror's evolution, constructed in a highly entertaining manner and chock full of nostalgia, it's a well-rounded doc worth watching."
