= List of Sundance Film Festival selections =

This is a partial list of films shown at the Sundance Film Festival (called the Utah/US Film Festival in its earliest years and then the U.S. Film and Video Festival, before becoming the Sundance Film Festival in 1991).

== 1978 ==
Dates: September 6 – September 12; Theme: "American Landscapes: Cycles of Hope and Despair"; stylized as the Utah-USFilm Festival.

Film name (English)	Film name (Non-English)	Directed By	Written By	Category	Awards
A Streetcar Named Desire		Elia Kazan	Elia Kazan, Tennessee Williams, Oscar Saul	Retrospective	
The Apartment		Billy Wilder	Billy Wilder	Retrospective	
Baby Doll		Elia Kazan	Tennessee Williams	Retrospective	
Badlands		Terrence Malick	Terrence Malick	Retrospective	
Bushman		David Schickele		Regional Cinema Competition	
Deliverance		John Boorman		Retrospective	
Flying Leathernecks		Nicholas Ray		Retrospective	
Johnny Vik		Charles Nauman	Charles Nauman	Regional Cinema Competition	
Girlfriends		Claudia Weill	Vicki Polon	Regional Cinema Competition	Jury Prize
The Left-Handed Gun		Arthur Penn		Retrospective	
Local Color		Mark Rappaport	Mark Rappaport	Regional Cinema Competition	
Martin		George A. Romero	George A. Romero	Regional Cinema Competition	
McCabe and Mrs. Miller		Robert Altman		Retrospective	
Mean Streets		Martin Scorsese	Martin Scorsese, Mardik Martin	Retrospective	
Midnight Cowboy		John Schlesinger		Retrospective	
My Darling Clementine		John Ford		Retrospective	
Pat Garrett and Billy the Kid		Sam Peckinpah		Retrospective	
Next Stop, Greenwich Village		Paul Mazursky		Regional Cinema Competition	
Not a Pretty Picture		Martha Coolidge		Regional Cinema Competition	
Property		Penny Allen	Penny Allen	Regional Cinema Competition	
The Quiet Man		John Ford		Retrospective	
Red River		Howard Hawks		Retrospective	
The Reivers		Mark Rydell		Retrospective	
Rio Bravo		Howard Hawks		Retrospective	
Sands of Iwo Jima		Allan Dwan		Retrospective	
The Searchers		John Ford		Retrospective	
She Wore a Yellow Ribbon		John Ford		Retrospective	
Stagecoach		John Ford		Retrospective	
Sweet Smell of Success		Alexander Mackendrick		Retrospective	
True Grit		Henry Hathaway		Retrospective	
The Whole Shootin' Match		Eagle Pennell	Eagle Pennell, Lin Sutherland	Regional Cinema Competition	Jury Prize

== 1979 ==
Dates: October 26 – October 30; Theme: "Fear and Fantasy"

Film name (English)	Film name (Non-English)	Directed By	Written By	Category	Awards
1988: The Remake		Richard Schmidt			Honorable Mention—Independent Film Competition
Agee		Ross Spears	Ross Spears	Documentary	Honorable Mention—Independent Film Competition
American Madness		Frank Capra	Robert Riskin	Retrospective	
Badlands		Terrence Malick	Terrence Malick	Retrospective	
The Birds		Alfred Hitchcock	Evan Hunter	Retrospective	
Caprice		Frank Tashlin	Jay Jason and Frank Tashlin	Retrospective	
Casablanca		Michael Curtiz		Retrospective	
Chameleon		Jon Jost	Jon Jost		Finalist—Independent Film Competition
Citizens' Band		Jonathan Demme	Jonathan Demme		
The Day the Earth Stood Still		Robert Wise		Retrospective	
The Demon Seed		Donald Cammell			
Dirty Harry				Retrospective	
Down in the Valley		Mort Rosenfeld	Mort Rosenfeld		
Dr. Strangelove				Retrospective	
Easy Rider		Dennis Hopper	Peter Fonda, Dennis Hopper, Terry Southern	Retrospective	
Effects		John Harrison, Dusty Nelson, and Pat Buba			Finalist—Independent Film Competition
Family Plot		Alfred Hitchcock			
Five Easy Pieces		Bob Rafelson		Retrospective	
Forbidden Planet		Fred M. Wilcox		Retrospective	
The Front		Martin Ritt	Walter Bernstein		
Fun with Dick and Jane		Ted Kotcheff	David Giler, Jerry Belson, Mordecai Richler		
Gas City		Jeff Meyers			Honorable Mention—Independent Film Competition
The Goddess		John Cromwell		Retrospective	
The Golden Voyage of Sinbad		Gordon Hessler			
Halloween		John Carpenter	John Carpenter, Debra Hill		
How to Murder Your Wife		Richard Quine		Retrospective	
In Cold Blood		Richard Brooks	Richard Brooks	Retrospective	
The Incredible Shrinking Man		Jack Arnold		Retrospective	
Invasion of the Body Snatchers		Philip Kaufman			
It Happened One Night		Frank Capra		Retrospective	
It's a Wonderful Life		Frank Capra		Retrospective	
Jason and the Argonauts		Don Chaffey	Beverley Cross, Jan Read	Retrospective	
The Last Picture Show		Peter Bogdanovich	Larry McMurtry, Peter Bogdanovich	Retrospective	
Lost Horizon		Frank Capra	Robert Riskin	Retrospective	
Marnie		Alfred Hitchcock		Retrospective	
Mr. Deeds Goes to Town		Frank Capra		Retrospective	
Mr. Smith Goes to Washington		Frank Capra		Retrospective	
Northern Lights		Rob Nilsson, John Hansen	John Hanson, Rob Nilsson		Finalist—Independent Film Competition
Obsession		Brian De Palma			
Over-Under Sideways-Down		Eugene Corr, Steve Wax, Peter Gessner	Eugene Corr, Peter Gessner		Finalist—Independent Film Competition
Platinum Blonde		Frank Capra		Retrospective	
Play It Again Sam		Herbert Ross		Retrospective	
Pretty Poison		Noel Black		Retrospective	
Psycho		Alfred Hitchcock		Retrospective	
The Raven		Roger Corman		Retrospective	
The Seven-Year Itch		Billy Wilder		Retrospective	
The Seventh Voyage of Sinbad		Ray Harryhausen	Kenneth Kolb	Retrospective	
Sleeper		Woody Allen		Retrospective	
Some Like It Hot		Billy Wilder		Retrospective	
Spirit of the Wind		Ralph Liddle	Ralph Liddle, John Logue		Grand Prize—Independent Film Competition
The Stepford Wives		Bryan Forbes	William Goldman	Retrospective	
Straw Dogs		Sam Peckinpah		Retrospective	
Sugarland Express		Steven Spielberg		Retrospective	
Targets		Peter Bogdanovich		Retrospective	
The Thomas Crown Affair		Norman Jewison		Retrospective	
A Thousand Clowns		Fred Coe		Retrospective	
To Catch a Thief		Alfred Hitchcock		Retrospective	
Watermelon Man		Melvin Van Peebles		Retrospective	
Wonder Man		Bruce Humberstone		Retrospective	
You Can't Take It with You		Frank Capra		Retrospective	

== 1981 ==
Dates: January 12 – January 18; Utah/U.S. Film Festival

Film name (English)	Film name (Non-English)	Directed By	Written By	Category	Awards
America, Lost and Found		Lance Bird, Tom Johnson	John Crowley	Documentary	
Americana		David Carradine	Henry Morton Robinson	Dramatic	
A Small Circle of Friends		Rob Cohen	Ezra Sacks	Dramatic	
The Best Man		Franklin J. Schaffner	Gore Vidal	Henry Fonda Retrospective	
Breaking Glass		Brian Gibson	Brian Gibson	Dramatic	
The Day After Trinity		Jon H. Else	David Peoples, Janet Peoples, Jon Else	Documentary	
Eight Minutes to Midnight		Mary Benjamin		Documentary	
The Elephant Man		David Lynch	Christopher De Vore, Eric Bergren, David Lynch	Dramatic	
Fade to Black		Vernon Zimmerman	Vernon Zimmerman	Dramatic	
Feedback		Bill Doukas	Bill Doukas	Dramatic	
Fort Apache		John Ford	Frank S. Nugent	Henry Fonda Retrospective	
Gal Young Un		Victor Nuñez	Victor Nuñez	Dramatic	
The Grapes of Wrath		John Ford	Nunnally Johnson	Henry Fonda Retrospective	
The Haunting of M		Anna Thomas	Anna Thomas	Dramatic	
Heartland		Richard Pearce	Beth Ferris, William Kittredge, Elinore Randall Stewart	Dramatic	
Hide in Plain Sight		James Caan	Spencer Eastman	Dramatic	
Imposters		Mark Rappaport	Mark Rappaport	Dramatic	
The Lady Eve		Preston Sturges	Preston Sturges	Henry Fonda Retrospective	
LA LA, Making It in L.A.		Frank Mouris, Caroline Mouris		Documentary	
The Life and Times of Rosie the Riveter		Connie Field		Documentary	
Melvin and Howard		Jonathan Demme	Bo Goldman	Dramatic	
Mr. Roberts		John Ford, Mervyn LeRoy		Henry Fonda Retrospective	
My Darling Clementine		John Ford	Samuel G. Engel, Winston Miller	Henry Fonda Retrospective	
Off the Wall		Rick Friedberg	Dick Chudnow, Rick Friedberg, Ron Kurz	Dramatic	
Once Upon a Time in the West		Sergio Leone		Henry Fonda Retrospective	
On the Nickel		Ralph Waite	Ralph Waite	Dramatic	
Ordinary People		Robert Redford	Alvin Sargent	Dramatic	
The Ox-Bow Incident		William A. Wellman	Lamar Trotti	Henry Fonda Retrospective	
The Plan		Diane Orr, Larry Roberts		Documentary	
Return of the Secaucus Seven		John Sayles	John Sayles	Dramatic	
Stony Island		Andrew Davis	Tamar Simon Hoffs, Andrew Davis	Dramatic	
Tell Me a Riddle		Lee Grant	Joyce Eliason, Alev Lytle	Dramatic	
Tuck Everlasting		Frederick King Keller	Frederick King Keller	Dramatic	
Twelve Angry Men		Sidney Lumet	Reginald Rose	Henry Fonda Retrospective	
The War at Home		Barry Alexander Brown, Glenn Silber		Documentary	
Where the Buffalo Roam		Art Linson	John Kaye	Dramatic	
Wind Chimes		Robert Holman			Best Experimental Film
Zootsuit		Luis Valdez	Luis Valdez		

== 1982 ==
Dates: January 17 – ?; Utah/U.S. Film Festival

John Ford Medallion: Stanley Kramer

Film name (English)	Film name (Non-English)	Directed By	Written By	Category	Awards
5,000 Fingers of Dr. T		Stanley Kramer		Stanley Kramer Retrospective	
A Lady Named Baybie		Martha Sandlin		Documentary Competition	
Amarillo News Tapes		Doug Hall, Chip Lord, Jody Procter		Video Art Competition	
An Acquired Taste		Ralph Arlyck		Special Programs (Shorts)	
Artifacts: Pure and Applied				Video Art Competition	
Atomic Television		Trent Harris		Special Programs	
Between a Rock and a Hard Place		Kenneth Fink	Kenneth Fink	Documentary Competition	
Body Heat		Lawrence Kasdan	Lawrence Kasdan	Director's Showcase	
Booming		Dennis Lanson		Documentary Competition	
The Case of the Legless Veteran		Howard Petrick		Documentary Competition	
Chott el-Djerid		Carol Brandenburg		Video Art Competition	
Close Harmony		Nigel Noble		Special Programs (Shorts)	
The Complete Dale Hoyt, Vol. 7		Dale Hoyt		Video Art Competition	
The Crisco Kid		Jeanne Wolf	Jeanne Wolf	Video Documentary Competition	
The Curse of Fred Astaire		Mark Berger	Mark Berger	Dramatic Competition	
Cutter's Way		Ivan Passer	Jeffrey Alan Fiskin	New Directors	
The Defiant Ones		Stanley Kramer		Stanley Kramer Retrospective	
Don't Cry, It's Only Thunder		Peter Werner	Paul G. Hensler	New Directors	
The Dozens		Randall Conrad, Christine Dall	Randall Conrad, Christine Dall	Dramatic Competition	
Dreamland		Oz Scott	Nancy Baker	Documentary Competition	
Elephant Parts		William Dear		Special Programs	
El Salvador: Another Vietnam		Glenn Silber, Teté Vasconcellos		Documentary Competition	
End of Innocence		Stephen Sept		Special Programs (Shorts)	
Frank: A Vietnam Veteran		Fred Simon		Video Documentary Competition	
Gates of Heaven		Errol Morris		Documentary Competition	
Get Rollin'		J. Terrence Mitchell	J. Terrence Mitchell	Documentary Competition	
Guess Who's Coming to Dinner				Stanley Kramer Retrospective	
Heartworn Highways		James Szalapski	James Szalapski	Documentary Competition	
The Hideout		Brian Patrick		Special Programs (Shorts)	
How to Fly		Ed Bowes		Video Art Competition	
In Our Water		Meg Switzgable		Documentary Competition	
I Remember Barbra				Special Programs (Shorts)	
Killer of Sheep		Charles Burnett	Charles Burnett	Dramatic Competition	
Knightriders		George A. Romero	George A. Romero	New Directors	
Love in a Taxi		Robert Sickinger	Michael Kortchmar	Dramatic Competition	
Love Tapes		Wendy Clarke		Video Art Competition	
Melanie		Rex Bromfield	Michael Green, Richard Paluck, Robert Guza Jr.	New Directors	
Missing		Costa-Gavras	Costa-Gavras, Donald E. Stewart	Premieres	
Model		Frederick Wiseman		Documentary Competition	
Mystique		Bobby Roth	Beth Sullivan	Dramatic Competition	
No World for Men		William Rosser		Shorts (Doc)	
On Golden Pond		Mark Rydell	Ernest Thompson	Premieres	
Out		Eli Hollander	Eli Hollander	Dramatic Competition	
Paydirt		Penny Allen	Penny Allen	Dramatic Competition	
Possum Living		Nancy Schreiber		Special Programs (Shorts)	
Raggedy Man		Jack Fisk	William D. Wittliff	New Directors	
Return of the Secaucus Seven		John Sayles	John Sayles	Dramatic Competition	
Savage/Love		Sam Shepard, Joseph Chaiken		Video Art Competition	
The Sky Is Gray		Stan Lathan		Special Programs (Shorts)	
Soldier Girls		Nick Broomfield and Joan Churchill		Documentary Competition	Grand Jury Prize: Documentary
Strange Fruit		Seth Pinsker		Special Programs (Shorts)	
Street Music		Jenny Bowen	Jenny Bowen	Dramatic Competition	
Strong-Willed Women Subdue and Subjugate Reptiles		C. Larry Roberts		Special Programs (Shorts)	
Thief		Michael Mann	Michael Mann	New Directors	
Tibetan Death Rites		Norman Dhyrenfurth		Special Programs (Shorts)	
The Third Coast		Alan Raymond, Susan Raymond		Documentary Competition	
TV: The Enchanted Mirror		Julene Bair		Special Programs (Shorts)	
Union City		Mark Reichert	Mark Reichert	Dramatic Competition	
We Are the Guinea Pigs		Joan Harvey		Documentary Competition	
The Weavers: Wasn't That a Time!		Jim Brown		Documentary Competition	
The Willmar 8		Lee Grant			
The Whole Shootin' Match		Eagle Pennell	Eagle Pennell, Lin Sutherland		
Wolfen		Michael Wadleigh	David Eyre, Michael Wadleigh	New Directors	
Zootsuit		Luis Valdez	Luis Valdez	New Directors	

== 1983 ==
Dates: January 17 – January 23; Utah/U.S. Film Festival

Film name (English)	Film name (Non-English)	Directed By	Written By	Category	Awards
The Atomic Artist		Glenn Silber		Documentary Shorts	
Atomic Cafe		Kevin Rafferty, Jayne Loader, Pierce Rafferty		Documentary Competition	
The Ballad of Gregorio Cortez		Robert M. Young	Victor Villasenor, Robert M. Young	Dramatic Competition	Special Jury Prize
Ballet Robotique		Bob Rogers		Shorts	
Becoming American		Ken Levine, Ivory Waterworth Levine		Documentary Competition	
The Brig					
Burden of Dreams		Les Blank	Les Blank	Documentary Competition	
Chan Is Missing		Wayne Wang	Isaac Cronin, Terrel Seltzer, Wayne Wang	Dramatic Competition	Special Jury Prize
Citizen		William Farley	William Farley	Dramatic Competition	
Clotheslines		Roberta Cantow		Shorts	
Come Back, Africa		Lionel Rogosin	Lionel Rogosin, Lewis Nkosi, William Modisane	Retrospective	
Coming of Age		Josh Hanig		Documentary Competition	
Conversations with Willard van Dyke		Amalie R. Rothschild		Documentary Competition	
The Cool World		Shirley Clarke		New Wave Retrospective	
Dark Circle		Judy Irving		Documentary Competition	
David Holzman's Diary		Jim McBride	James McBride	Retrospective	
Dream On!		Ed Harker	Ed Harker	Dramatic Competition	
Eating Raoul		Paul Bartel	Paul Bartel	Dramatic Competition	
The Escape Artist		Caleb Deschanel		Premieres	
The Eyes of the Amaryllis		Frederick King Keller	Frederick King Keller, Stratton Rawson	Dramatic Competition	
Fire on the Water		Robert Hillman	Robert Hillman	Documentary Competition	
Frances		Graeme Clifford	Eric Bergren, Christopher De Vore, Nicholas Kazan	Premieres	
The Gates of Hell		Iris Cantor, David Saxon		Documentary Competition	
The Grey Fox		Phillip Borsos	John Hunter	Premieres	
How Much Is Enough? Decision-Making in the Nuclear Age		Samuel R. Shore		Video Competition	
Man on the Empire State		Teodoro Maus		Video Competition	
Max Reber: Billboard Artist		Robert Marshall, James Christiansen		Documentary Short	
The Mediterranean		Yan Nascimbene	Yan Nascimbene	Dramatic Competition	
Miles to Go		Hilary Maddux, Deborah Boldt		Documentary Competition	
Mission Hill		Robert Jones	Ann Jones, Robert Jones	Dramatic Competition	
Moses Pendleton Presents Moses Pendleton		Robert Elfstrom		Documentary Competition	
No World for Men		William Rosser			
The Personals		Peter Markle		Dramatic Competition	
Phantom Cowboy		Swain Wolfe		Documentary Shorts	
Portrait of Jason		Shirley Clarke		Retrospective	
Poto and Cabengo		Jean-Pierre Gorin		Documentary Competition	
Pull My Daisy		Robert Frank		New Wave Retrospective	
Purple Haze		David Burton Morris	Victoria Wozniak	Dramatic Competition	Grand Jury Prize: Dramatic
The Savage Eye		Ben Maddow		New Wave Retrospective	
Say Amen, Somebody		George T. Nierenberg		Documentary Competition	
Shadows		John Cassavetes	John Cassavetes, Robert Alan Arthur	New Wave Retrospective	
SL-1		Diane Orr, C. Larry Roberts		Documentary Competition	
Smithereens		Susan Seidelman		Premieres	
Sophie's Choice		Allan J. Pakula		Premieres	
Valley Town		Willard Van Dyke		Retrospective	
Vernon, Florida		Errol Morris		Documentary Competition	

== 1984 ==
Dates: January 23 – 29; Utah/U.S. Film Festival

Film name (English)	Film name (Non-English)	Directed By	Written By	Category	Awards
Android		Aaron Lipstadt		Dramatic	
Angelo, My Love		Robert Duval			
Black Wax		Robert Mugge		Documentary	
Can She Bake a Cherry Pie?		Henry Jaglom	Henry Jaglom	Premieres	
Chicken Ranch		Nick Broomfield and Sandi Sissel		Documentary	
Circus		Lear Levin		Documentary	
Citizen: The Political Life of Allard K. Lowenstein		Julie Thompson		Documentary	
Comedienne		Katherine Matheson		Documentary	
Crackers		Louis Malle			
The Draughtsman's Contract		Peter Greenaway			
The Electric Valley		Ross Spears		Documentary	
El Norte		Gregory Nava			
Enormous Changes at the Last Minute		Mirra Bank, Ellen Hovde, Muffie Meyer	John Sayles, Susan Rice	Premieres	
Enter the Bassett (aka Awesome Lotus)		David O'Malley		Dramatic	
The Good Fight		Noel Buckner, Mary Dore, Sam Sills		Documentary	
Hero		Alexandre Rockwell	Alexandre Rockwell	Dramatic	
Home Free All		Stewart Bird	Stewart Bird		
Last Night at the Alamo		Eagle Pennell	Kim Henkel	Dramatic	Special Jury Prize: Dramatic
Made in America		Bill Donovan		Shorts	
My Brother's Wedding		Charles Burnett		Dramatic	
Nightsongs		Marva Nabili		Dramatic	
Old Enough		Marisa Silver	Marisa Silver	Dramatic	Grand Jury Prize: Dramatic
Plague Dogs		Martin Rosen	Martin Rosen	Premieres	
Vietnam: The Secret Agent		Jacki Ochs		Documentary	
Seeing Red		Julia Reichert, Jim Klein		Documentary	
Signal 7		Rob Nilsson	Rob Nilsson		
Splash		Ron Howard	Lowell Ganz, Babaloo Mandel, Bruce Jay Friedman		
Stranger's Kiss		Matthew Chapman	Matthew Chapman, Blaine Novak		
Streamers		Robert Altman			
Style Wars		Tony Silver		Documentary	Grand Jury Prize: Documentary
Suburbia		Penelope Spheeris	Penelope Spheeris	Dramatic	
Summerspell		Lina Shanklin	Lina Shanklin	Dramatic	
Tomorrow		Joseph Anthony	Horton Foote	Retrospective	
Vamping		Frederick King Keller	Michael Healy, Frederick King Keller, Robert Seidman	Dramatic	
We Are Not the Jet Set		Robert Duvall		Documentary	
When the Mountains Tremble		Pamela Yates		Documentary	
Wildrose		John Hanson	Eugene Corr, John Hanson, Sandra Schulberg	Dramatic	

== 1985 ==
Dates: ? – ?; Sundance Institute Presents the United States Film Festival

Film name (English)	Film name (Non-English)	Directed By	Written By	Category	Awards
The 400 Blows	Les quatre cents coups	François Truffaut		Retrospective	
Almost You	Domicile conjugal	Adam Brooks		Dramatic Competition	Special Jury Prize: Dramatic
America and Lewis Hine		Nina Rosenblum		Documentary	Special Jury Prize: Documentary
Antoine et Colette		François Truffaut		Retrospective	
Battle Beyond the Stars		Jimmy T. Murakami	John Sayles	Retrospective	
Bed and Board		Francois Truffaut		Retrospective	
Before Stonewall: The Making of a Gay and Lesbian Community		Greta Schiller		Documentary	
Blood Simple		Joel Coen	Joel Coen, Ethan Coen	Dramatic	Grand Jury Prize: Dramatic
A Boring Afternoon	Fádní odpoledne	Ivan Passer	Ivan Passer	Retrospective	
Boxcar Bertha		Martin Scorsese	Joyce H. Corrington, John William Corrington	Retrospective	
Brady's Escape	Hosszú vágta	Pál Gábor	Pál Gábor, William W. Lewis		
The Brother from Another Planet		John Sayles	John Sayles	Dramatic	Special Jury Prize: Dramatic
The Business of America		Larry Adelman, Lawrence Daressa, Bruce Schmiechen		Documentary	
Caged Heat		Jonathan Demme	Jonathan Demme	Retrospective	
Chinese Boxes		Christopher Petit			
Cold Feet		Bruce Van Dusen		Dramatic Competition	
Cutter's Way		Ivan Passer	Jeffrey Alan Fiskin	Dramatic	
Day for Night	La nuit americaine	François Truffaut	François Truffaut, Jean-Louis Richard	Retrospective	
Death Race 2000		Paul Bartel	Robert Thom, Charles B. Griffith, Ib Melchior	Retrospective	
Dementia 13		Francis Ford Coppola	Francis Ford Coppola, Jack Hill	Retrospective	
Dialogue with a Woman Departed		Leo Hurwitz	Leo Hurwitz	Documentary	
The Falcon and the Snowman		John Schlesinger	Steven Zaillian		
Far From Poland		Jill Godmilow		Documentary	
Distant Thunder	Enrai	Kichitaro Negishi	Haruhiko Arai		
A Flash of Green		Victor Nunez	Victor Nunez	Dramatic	
Flight to Berlin	Fluchtpunkt Berlin	Christopher Petit			
Gas-s-s!		Roger Corman	George Armitage		
The Go Masters	Mikan no taikyoku	Ji-shun Duan, Junya Satô, Shu'an Liu	Tang-tong Ge, Fumio Kônami, Hong-zhou Li, Yasuko Ôno		
The Gold Diggers		Sally Potter	Sally Potter, Rose English		
The Gospel According to Al Green		Robert Mugge		Documentary	
Where the Green Ants Dream		Werner Herzog	Werner Herzog, Bob Ellis		
Hard Choices		Rick King	Rick King, Robert Mickelson	Dramatic	
Heartbreakers		Bobby Roth	Bobby Roth	Dramatic	
In Heaven There Is No Beer?		Les Blank		Documentary	Special Jury Prize: Documentary
The Hit		Stephen Frears	Peter Prince		
The Hopi: Songs of the Fourth World		Pat Ferrero		Documentary	
The Illusionist	De Illusionist	Jos Stelling	Freek de Jonge, Jos Stelling		
Intimate Lighting	Intimní osvětlení	Ivan Passer	Ivan Passer, Jaroslav Papoušek, Václav Šašek	Retrospective	
Jack Kerouac's America		John Antonelli		Documentary	
A Joke of Destiny		Lina Wertmüller	Lina Wertmüller, Agenore Incrocci		
Kaddish		Steve Brand		Documentary	Special Jury Prize: Documentary
The Killing Fields		Roland Joffé		Documentary	
The Killing Floor		Bill Duke	Leslie Lee, Ron Milner, Elsa Rassbach	Dramatic	Special Jury Prize: Dramatic
The Last Seduction		Kim Dempster		Short	
Law and Disorder		Ivan Passer	Ivan Passer, William Richert, Kenneth Harris Fishman	Retrospective	
The Lift	De Lift	Dick Maas	Dick Maas		
The Little Shop of Horrors		Roger Corman			
A Love in Germany	Eine Leibe in Deutschland	Andrzej Wajda			
Low Visibility		Patricia Gruben	Patricia Gruben	Drama	
Mass Appeal		Glenn Jordan	Bill C. Davis		
Monkey Grip		Ken Cameron			
Mosquito on the Tenth Floor	Jukai No Mosukiito	Yoichi Sai	Yoichi Sai		
Mother's Meat and Freud's Flesh		Demetri Estdelacropolis	Demetri Estdelacropolis		
Moving Out		Michael Pattinson	Jan Sardi		
Mrs. Soffel		Gillian Armstrong	Ron Nyswaner		
The Night the Prowler		Jim Sharman	Patrick White		
Not for Publication		Paul Bartel	Paul Bartel, John Meyer		
Paris, Texas		Wim Wenders	L.M. Kit Carson, Sam Shepard	Premieres	
Pebbles	Kieselstein	Lukas Stepanik		World Cinema	
Piranha		Joe Dante	John Sayles	Retrospective	
The Purple Rose of Cairo		Woody Allen	Woody Allen	Premieres	
Radio On		Chris Petit			
The Real Thing		Peter Schnall			
Rock 'n' Roll High School		Allan Arkush		Retrospective	
The Roommate		Neil Cox	Neal Miller, Paul Pekin, Randall Fried	Dramatic	
Secret Honor		Robert Altman	Donald Freed, Arnold M. Stone		
Seventeen		Joel DeMott, Jeff Kreines		Documentary	Grand Jury Prize: Documentary
Silver Bears		Ivan Passer		Dramatic	
Silver City		Sophia Turkiewicz	Thomas Keneally, Sophia Turkiewicz	Dramatic	
Sprout Wings and Fly		Les Blank		Documentary	
Squizzy Taylor		Kevin James Dobson	Roger Simpson		
Stolen Kisses	Baisers Voles	François Truffaut	François Truffaut, Claude de Givray, Bernard Revon	Retrospective	
Stranger Than Paradise		Jim Jarmusch	Jim Jarmusch	Dramatic	Special Jury Prize: Dramatic
Strategic Trust: The Making of a Nuclear Free Palau		James Heddle		Documentary	
Streetwise		Martin Bell		Documentary	Special Jury Prize: Documentary
Strikebound		Richard Lowenstein	Richard Lowenstein		
Targets					
Tattoo [Irezumi] Ari		Toshiaki Takahasi			
The Times of Harvey Milk		Rob Epstein		Documentary	Special Jury Prize: Documentary
The Trip to Bountiful		Peter Masterson	Horton Foote		
An Unsuitable Job for a Woman		Chris Petit	P. D. James, Elizabeth McKay, Chris Petit, Brian Scobie		
Way Down East		D. W. Griffith		Retrospective	
Wild Angels		Roger Corman		Retrospective	
The Work I've Done		Kenneth Fink		Documentary	
The World of Tomorrow		Tom Johnson		Documentary	

== 1986 ==
Dates: January 17 – January 26; The United States Film Festival

Film name (English)	Film name (Non-English)	Directed By	Written By	Category	Awards
Allies		Marian Wilkinson		Independent Australia (Documentary)	
Belizaire: The Cajun		Glen Pitre	Glen Pitre	Dramatic Competition	
Bliss		Ray Lawrence	Peter Carey, Ray Lawrence	Independent Australia (Dramatic)	
Camera Natura		Ross Gibson		Independent Australia (Short)	
Chain Letters		Mark Rappaport	Mark Rappaport	Dramatic Competition	
Chimes at Midnight		Orson Welles		Chimes at Night: Orson Welles Remembered	
Citizen Kane		Orson Welles		Chimes at Night: Orson Welles Remembered	
Contrary Warrior: A Story of the Crow Tribe		Connie Poten	Beth Ferris	Documentary Competition	
The Cosmic Eye		Faith Hubley	Faith Hubley, John Hubley	Dramatic Competition	
Couldn't Be Fairer		Dennis O'Rourke	Mick Miller	Independent Australia (Documentary)	
Cowgirls		Nancy Kelly		Shorts	
The Day Time Noon		Sandy Smolan		Shorts	
Decade of Women		Gillian Armstrong		Independent Australia (Shorts)	
Desert Bloom		Eugene Corr	Eugene Corr, Linda Remy		
Desert Hearts		Donna Deitch	Natalie Cooper	Dramatic Competition	Special Jury Prize: Dramatic
Dim Sum		Wayne Wang	Terrel Seltzer		
Double Negative		Sam Irvin	Sam Irvin	Short	
The Drover’s Wife		Sue Brooks	Sue Castrique	Independent Australia (Short)	
Einstein on the Beach		Mark Obenhaus		Documentary	
Emoh Ruo		Denny Lawrence	Paul Leadon, David Paltorak	Independent Australia (Dramatic)	
F/X		Robert Mandel	Gregory Fleeman, Robert T. Megginson		
Fast Talking		Ken Cameron	Ken Cameron	Independent Australia (Dramatic)	
For Love or Money		Megan McMurchy, Jeni Thornley	Megan McMurchy, Jeni Thornley	Independent Australia (Documentary)	
Fran		Glenda Hambly	Glenda Hambly	Independent Australia (Dramatic)	
Going Down		Haydn Keenan	Julie Berry, Moira Maclaine-Cross	Independent Australia (Dramatic)	
The Great Wall Is a Great Wall		Peter Wang	Shirley Sun, Peter Wang	Dramatic Competition	
Growing Up with Rockets		Nancy Yasecko		Documentary	
Half Life		Dennis O'Rourke	Dennis O'Rourke	Independent Australia (Documentary)	
Hannah and Her Sisters		Woody Allen	Woody Allen	Premieres	
Hard Traveling		Dan Bessie	Dan Bessie		
Heartbreakers		Bobby Roth	Bobby Roth	Seminar Screenings	
Imagine the Sound		Ron Mann		The Films of Ron Mann	
In Her Own Time		Lynne Littman		Documentary	
Huey Long		Ken Burns	Geoffrey C. Ward	Documentary	
Imagine the Sound		Ron Mann		Documentary	
Kemira: Diary of a Strike		Tom Zubrycki		Independent Australia (Documentary)	
The Lady from Shanghai		Orson Welles		Chimes at Night: Orson Welles Remembered	
Las Madres: The Mothers of the Plaza del Mayo		Susana Munoz, Lourdes Portillo		Documentary	Special Jury Prize: Documentary
Lion in the Doorway		Prabhubodha John Walker	Prabhubodha John Walker	Independent Australia (Short)	
Listen to the City		Ron Mann		The Films of Ron Mann	
Lost Horizon		Frank Capra		Retrospective	
Louie Bluie		Terry Zwigoff		Documentary	
The Magnificent Ambersons		Orson Welles		Chimes at Night: Orson Welles Remembered	
The Man You Know		Steve Jacobs	Steve Jacobs	Independent Australia (Short)	
Marcia Resnick’s Bad Boys		Ron Mann		The Films of Ron Mann	
Nicaragua Was Our Home		Lee Shapiro			
On the Loose		Jane Oehr	Jane Oehr, Ken Cameron, Mark Stiles, Tom McPartland, Tom Gooding	Independent Australia (Dramatic)	
On Valentine’s Day		Kenneth Harrison	Horton Foote		
One Woman or Two	Une Femme ou Deux	Daniel Vigne	Daniel Vigne, Élisabeth Rappeneau		
The Orkly Kid		Trent Harris	Trent Harris	Shorts	
Othello		Orson Welles		Chimes at Night: Orson Welles Remembered	
Parting Glances		Bill Sherwood	Bill Sherwood	Dramatic	
Poetry in Motion		Ron Mann		The Films of Ron Mann	
Power		Sidney Lumet	David Himmelstein		
Private Conversations		Christian Blackwood		Documentary	
Rate It X		Paula De Koenigsberg, Lucy Winer		Documentary	
Raw Tunes		Dan Lewk, Gary Levy	Dan Lewk, Gary Levy	Dramatic	
Restless Natives		Michael Hoffman	Ninian Dunnett	Dramatic	
The Return of Ruben Blades		Robert Mugge	Robert Mugge	Documentary	
Rocking the Foundations		Pat Fiske		Independent Australia (Documentary)	
Serious Undertakings		Helen Grace		Independent Australia (Short)	
Seven Minutes in Heaven		Linda Feferman	Jane Bernstein, Linda Feferman	Dramatic	Special Jury Prize for the Genre of Youth Comedy: Dramatic
Singles		Karl McPhee		Independent Australia (Documentary)	
Smooth Talk		Joyce Chopra	Tom Cole	Dramatic	Grand Jury Prize: Dramatic
Static		Mark Romanek	Keith Gordon, Mark Romanek	Dramatic	
Stations		Jackie McKimmie		Independent Australia (Short)	
A Street to Die		Bill Bennett	Bill Bennett	Independent Australia (Dramatic)	
Stripper		Jerome Gary	Charles Gaines	Documentary	
Tom Goes to the Bar		Dean Parisot	Michael Taav	Short	
Touch of Evil		Orson Welles		Chimes at Night: Orson Welles Remembered	
Traps		John Hughes	John Hughes	Independent Australia (Dramatic)	
The Trip to Bountiful		Peter Masterson	Horton Foote	Premieres	Opening Night
Trouble In Mind		Alan Rudolph	Alan Rudolph		
Troupers		Glenn Silber, Claudia Vianello		Documentary Competition	
Unfinished Business		Bob Ellis	Bob Ellis	Independent Australia (Dramatic)	
The Unheard Music		W.T. Morgan	W.T. Morgan	Seminar Screenings	
Valley Girl		Martha Coolidge		Jury Member Screenings	
The Waiting		Scott Williams	Amy Dundleberger	Shorts	
Wildcatter: The Story of Texas Oil		Robert Tranchin		Documentary Competition	
The Woman and the Stranger		Rainer Simon	Rainer Simon		
Wrong Side of the Road		Ned Lander	Ned Lander	Independent Australia (Dramatic)	
Wrong World		Ian Pringle	Doug Ling, Ian Pringle	Independent Australia (Dramatic)	
A Year of the Quiet Sun		Krzysztof Zanussi		Jury Member Screenings	
You Got to Move		Lucy Massie Phenix, Veronica Selver		Documentary	

== 1987 ==
Dates: January 16 – January 25; Sundance Institute Presents the United States Film Festival

Film name (English)	Film name (Non-English)	Directed By	Written By	Category	Awards
84 Charing Cross Road		David Hugh Jones	Hugh Whitmore	Premieres	
90 Days		Giles Walker	Giles Walker, David Wilson	Canada: The Next Wave	
All-American High		Keva Rosenfield		Documentary	
Anne Trister		Léa Pool	Léa Pool, Marcel Beaulieu	Canada: The Next Wave	
A Promise		Yoshishige Yoshida	Fukiko Miyauchi, Yoshishige Yoshida	Special Screenings	
Are We Winning, Mommy?		Barbara Margolis		Documentary	
As Seen on TV		David Rimmer		Canada: The Next Wave	
Beehive		Frank Moore, Jim Self		Shorts	
Betty Blue	37˚2 Le Matin	Jean-Jacques Beineix	Jean-Jacques Beineix	Special Screenings	
Beyond Therapy		Robert Altman	Robert Altman	Premieres	
The Big Easy		Jim McBride		Premieres	
Bingo Inferno		David O. Russell	David O. Russell	Shorts	
Bullfighter and the Lady		Budd Boetticher		Retrospective	
The Cabinet of Jan Svankmajer		The Quay Brothers		Four from Four (and Four More)	
Chile: When Will It End?	Chile: Hasta Cuando?	David Bradbury			Excellence in Cinematography Award: Documentary, Special Jury Prize: Documentary
A Composer’s Notes		Michael Blackwood		Documentary	
Crime Wave		John Paizs	John Paizs	Canada: The Next Wave	
Dancing in the Dark		Leon Marr	Leon Marr	Canada: The Next Wave	
Dead End Kids		JoAnne Akalaitis	JoAnne Akalaitis	Dramatic Competition	
The Decline of the American Empire	Le Declin de L’Empire Americain	Denys Arcand	Denys Arcand	Canada: The Next Wave	
Do Not Enter: The Visa War Against Ideas		Robert Richter, Catherine Hiller		Documentary	
Drive-In Blues		Jan Krawitz		Documentary Short	
The Electronic Sweatshop	Quel numéro	Sophie Bissonnette		Canada: The Next Wave	
Fatherland		Ken Loach		Four from Four (and Four More)	
Final Offer		Sturla Gunnarsson, Robert Collison		Canada: The Next Wave	
Forest of Bliss		Robert Gardner		Special Screenings	
Frances Steloff		Deborah Dickson		Documentary Short	
The Fringe Dwellers		Bruce Beresford	Bruce Beresford, Rhoisin Beresford	Premieres	
The Great Horseshoe Crab Field Trip		Grania Gurievitch, Ann Schaetzel		Documentary	
Hellfire: A Journey From Hiroshima		Michael Camerini, John Junkerman, James MacDonald		Documentary	
Her Name Is Lisa		Rachid Kerdouche	Ron Gott	Dramatic Competition	
Hoosiers		David Anspaugh	Angelo Pizzo	Premieres	
Impure Thoughts		Michael A. Simpson	Michael J. Malloy, Michael A. Simpson	Dramatic Competition	
Intimate Power	Pouvoir intime	Yves Simoneau	Pierre Curzi, Yves Simoneau	Canada: The Next Wave	
Isaac in America		Amram Nowak			
Islands		Albert Maysles, David Maysles		Documentary	
Jacques and November	Jacques et novembre	François Bouvier, Jean Beaudry	François Bouvier, Jean Beaudry	Canada: The Next Wave	
Jimi Plays Monterey		Chris Hegedus, D.A. Pennebaker		Documentary Competition	
John and the Missus		Gordon Pinsent	Gordon Pinsent	Canada: The Next Wave	
Karen Blixen		Nic Lichtenberg		Documentary Short	
The Last Glacier	Le Dernier glacier	Roger Frappier, Jacques Leduc	Roger Frappier, Jacques Leduc	Canada: The Next Wave	
Leos Janaceck: Intimate Excursions		Keith Griffiths		Four from Four (and Four More)	
Lily Tomlin		Nick Broomfield, Joan Churchill		Documentary Competition	
Linda Joy		Linda Busby, William D. MacGillivray		Canada: The Next Wave	
Little Songs of the Chief Officer of Hunar Louse		Brothers Quay		Four from Four (and Four More)	
Living on Tokyo Time		Steven Okazaki		Dramatic Competition	
Loyalties		Anne Wheeler	Sharon Riis	Canada: The Next Wave	
My American Cousin		Sandy Wilson	Sandy Wilson	Canada: The Next Wave	
My Little Girl		Connie Kaiserman	Connie Kaiserman, Nan Mason	Dramatic Competition	
Next of Kin		Atom Egoyan		Canada: The Next Wave	
No Picnic		Philip Hartman	Philip Hartman	Dramatic Competition	Excellence in Cinematography Award: Dramatic
Off Season		Mary Arbuckle	Mark Rance, L.M. Kit Carson, Richard Barber	Special Screenings	
Ozawa		David Maysles, Albert Maysles, Susan Froemke, Deborah Dickson		Documentary Competition	
Invisible Thread		Bob Balaban		Shorts	
Pica-Don		Renzo Kinoshita		Shorts	
Ping Pong		Po-Chih Leong	Jerry Liu	Four from Four (and Four More)	
Playing Away		Horace Ové	Caryl Phillips	Four from Four (and Four More)	
Positive I.D.		Andy Anderson	Andy Anderson	Dramatic Competition	
Precious Images		Chuck Workman	Chuck Workman	Documentary short	
Ranch		Steven DeNure, Christopher Lowry		Canada: The Next Wave	
Richard Cardinal: Cry from a Diary of a Metis Child		Alanis Obomsawin		Canada: The Next Wave	
Rita, Sue and Bob Too		Alan Clarke	Andrea Dunbar	Four from Four (and Four More)	
River’s Edge		Tim Hunter	Neal Jimenez	Dramatic Competition	
Seize the Day		Fielder Cook	Ronald Ribman	Dramatic Competition	
Shake!: Otis at Monterey		D. A. Pennebaker, Chris Hegedus, David Dawkins		Documentary Competition	
Sherman's March		Ross McElwee	Ross McElwee	Documentary Competition	Grand Jury Prize: Documentary
Sitting in Limbo		John N. Smith	Richard Nichol	Canada: The Next Wave	
Sleepwalk		Sara Driver	Kathleen Brennan, Sara Driver, Lorenzo Mans	Dramatic Competition	
Sonatine		Micheline Lanctôt	Micheline Lanctôt	Canada: The Next Wave	
Spark Among the Ashes: A Bar Mitzvah in Poland		Oren Rudavsky		Documentary Competition	
Square Dance		Daniel Petrie	Daniel Petrie	Premieres	Opening Night
Stacking		Martin Rosen	Victoria Jenkins	Dramatic Competition	
Stations		William D. MacGillivray	William D. MacGillivray	Canada: The Next Wave	
Street of Crocodiles		Brothers Quay		Four from Four (and Four More)	
Sullivan's Pavilion		Fred G. Sullivan	Fred G. Sullivan	Dramatic Competition	Special Jury Prize: Dramatic
Trouble with Dick		Gary Walkow	Gary Walkow	Dramatic Competition	Grand Jury Prize: Dramatic (ex-aequo)
Up		Sam Kaufman		Shorts	
Waiting for the Moon		Jill Godmilow	Mark Magill	Dramatic Competition	Grand Jury Prize: Dramatic (ex-aequo)
A Walk on the Moon		Raphael D. Silver	William Mai	Dramatic Competition	
Welcome Back Mr. Fox		Walter Pitt	Walter Pitt	Short	
William Carlos Williams		Richard P. Rogers	Jill Janows	Documentary Competition	
Working Girls		Lizzie Borden	Lizzie Borden	Dramatic Competition	Special Jury Prize: Dramatic

== 1988 ==
Dates: January 15 – January 24; Sundance Institute Presents the United States Film Festival

Film name (English)	Film name (Non-English)	Directed By	Written By	Category	Awards
Acting Our Age		Michal Aviad		Documentary Competition	
Ain't No King Coming		Tia J.T. Lemke	Tia J.T. Lemke	Rogues Gallery: New American Shorts	
Anna Spilt the Oil		John F. Allen		Rogues Gallery: New American Shorts	
Arctic Wolves		Jim Brandenberg		The National Geographic Society: A Centennial Celebration	
Astronomy		Susan Rogers		Shorts	
Bad Connection	Malayunta	José Santiso	José Santiso	New Argentine Cinema	
Barbeque Death Squad from Hell		Art Wolff	Penn and Teller	Shorts	
Beirut: The Last Home Movie		Jennifer Fox	Jennifer Fox, John Mullen	Documentary	
Belinda in the Water		Christine Roum	Christine Roum	Shorts	
Ben-Hur		William Wyler		Restoration Premiere	
The Birthday Fish		Alex Zamm		Shorts	
Black Menu		Megan Daniels		Rogues Gallery: New American Shorts	
The Brave Little Toaster		Jerry Rees	Jerry Rees	Dramatic Competition	Special Jury Recognition
Break of Dawn		Isaac Artenstein	Isaac Artenstein	Dramatic Competition	
Broken Noses		Bruce Weber		Documentary Competition	
Camila		María Luisa Bemberg	María Luisa Bemberg, Beda Docampo Feijóo, Juan Bautista Stagnaro	New Argentine Cinema	
Cannibal Tours		Dennis O'Rourke		Special Screenings	
Chuck Solomon: Coming of Age		Marc Huestis		Documentary Competition	
The Crimson Kimono		Samuel Fuller		Tribute to Samuel Fuller	
The Days of June	Los días de junio	Alberto Fischerman	Alberto Fischerman, Gustavo Wagner	New Argentine Cinema	
Dear America: Letters Home from Vietnam		Bill Couturié	Bill Couturié, Richard Dewhurst	Documentary Competition	Special Jury Prize: Documentary
Dim Sum Take Out		Wayne Wang		Shorts	
Distant Harmony		DeWitt Sage		Documentary Competition	
Dogs of the Night	Perros de la noche	Teo Kofman	Pedro Espinosa	New Argentine Cinema	
Drawing on my Mind		Bob Kurtz		Picture Independence: The Best of North American Animation (Shorts)	
Easy Money	Plata dulce	Fernando Ayala	Oscar Viale, Jorge Goldenberg	New Argentine Cinema	
Elvis '56		Susan Raymond, Alan Raymond		Documentary Competition	
Evita: Listen If You Want To	Evita, quien quiera oír que oiga	Eduardo Mignogna		New Argentine Cinema	
The Family Album		Alan Berliner		Documentary Competition	
Fire From the Mountain		Deborah Shaffer		Documentary Competition	
Fixed Bayonets!		Samuel Fuller		Tribute to Samuel Fuller	
Friendship's Death		Peter Wollen	Peter Wollen	Special Screenings	
George and Rosemary		Alison Snowden, David Fine	Alison Snowden, David Fine	Picture Independence: The Best of North American Animation (Shorts)	
Geronima		Raúl Alberto Tosso	Carlos Paola, Jorge Pellegrini	New Argentine Cinema	
The Golden Ass		R.O. Blechman		Picture Independence: The Best of North American Animation (Shorts)	
Goodbye, Children	Au revoir les enfants	Louis Malle		Premieres	
The Great O'Grady		Robbie Fox	Robbie Fox	The Discovery Program (Shorts)	
Hairspray		John Waters	John Waters	Dramatic Competition	
The Harshness of Destiny	Del rigor del destino	Gerardo Vallejo	Gerardo Vallejo	New Argentine Cinema	
Heat and Sunlight		Rob Nilsson	Rob Nilsson	Dramatic Competition	Grand Jury Prize: Dramatic
Hell and High Water		Samuel Fuller		Tribute to Samuel Fuller	
The Houses Are Full of Smoke		Allan Francovich		Documentary Competition	
I Shot Jesse James		Samuel Fuller		Tribute to Samuel Fuller	
Interplast		Stephen Burns		The National Geographic Society: A Centennial Celebration	
Inside the Soviet Circus		Miriam Birch	Miriam Birch	The National Geographic Society: A Centennial Celebration	
The Jogger		Robert Resnikoff	Robert Resnikoff	Shorts	
John Huston & The Dubliners		Lilyan Sievernich		Documentary Competition	
John Lennon Sketchbook		John Canemaker		Picture Independence: The Best of North American Animation (Shorts)	
Juan: As if Nothing Ever Happened	Juan: como si nada hubiera sucedido	Carlos Echevarría		New Argentine Cinema	
A King and His Movie	La película del rey	Carlos Sorín	Carlos Sorín, Jorge Goldenberg	New Argentine Cinema	
Land of the Tigers		Dennis B. Kane, Thomas Skinne, Belinda Wrightr		The National Geographic Society: A Centennial Celebration	
Lazar		Gavrilo Gnatovich	Gavrilo Gnatovich	Picture Independence: The Best of North American Animation (Shorts)	
Lemon Sky		Jan Egleson	Lanford Wilson	Dramatic Competition	Special Jury Prize: Dramatic
Loose Ends		David Burton Morris	Victor Wozniak	Special Screenings	
The Lost Republic: Part Two	La república perdida II	Miguel Pérez		New Argentine Cinema	
Love Is a Fat Woman	El amor es una mujer gorda	Alejandro Agresti	Alejandro Agresti	New Argentine Cinema	
Made in USA		Ken Friedman	Ken Friedman	Dramatic Competition	
The Man Who Planted Trees		Frédéric Back	Jean Roberts	Picture Independence: The Best of North American Animation (Shorts)	
Miss... or Myth?		Geoffrey Dunn		Documentary Competition	
Missile		Frederick Wiseman		Documentary Competition	
Moonstruck		Norman Jewison	John Patrick Shanley	Premieres	
Night of the Pencils	La noche de los lápices	Héctor Olivera	Héctor Olivera, Daniel Kon	New Argentine Cinema	
No Applause, Just Throw Money		Karen Goodman		Shorts	
Nobody's Wife	Señora de Nadie	María Luisa Bemberg	María Luisa Bemberg	New Argentine Cinema	
Not Just Any Flower		Terry deRoy Gruber	Terry deRoy Gruber	Shorts	
Organic Fragment		Oskar Fischinger		Picture Independence: The Best of North American Animation (Shorts)	
Paradisia		Marcy Page		Picture Independence: The Best of North American Animation (Shorts)	
Park Row		Samuel Fuller		Tribute to Samuel Fuller	
Passages		Tony Venezia		Picture Independence: The Best of North American Animation (Shorts)	
Patti Rocks		David Burton Morris	John Jenkins, Karen Landry, David Burton Morris, Chris Mulkey	Dramatic Competition	
Photographer of the Year		Stephen Burns		The National Geographic Society: A Centennial Celebration	
Picture Window		Sara Petty		Picture Independence: The Best of North American Animation (Shorts)	
The Price of Life		Stephen Tolkin	Stephen Tolkin, Michel Montreaux	The Discovery Program (Shorts)	
Promised Land		Michael Hoffman	Michael Hoffman	Dramatic Competition	
Propagandance		Tom Sito		Picture Independence: The Best of North American Animation (Shorts)	
Rachel River		Sandy Smolan	Judith Guest	Dramatic Competition	
Radio Bikini		Robert Stone		Documentary Competition	
Ray's Male Heterosexual Dance Hall		Bryan Gordon	Bryan Gordon	The Discovery Program (Shorts)	
The Rhino War		Philip Cayford	Philip Cayford, Nancy LeBrun	The National Geographic Society: A Centennial Celebration	
The River Lethe		Amy Kravitz		Picture Independence: The Best of North American Animation (Shorts)	
Run of the Arrow		Samuel Fuller	Samuel Fuller	Tribute to Samuel Fuller	
Shock Corridor		Samuel Fuller	Samuel Fuller	Tribute to Samuel Fuller	
Signed: Lino Brocka		Christian Blackwood		Special Screenings	
The Silence at Bethany		Joel Oliansky	Joyce Keener	Dramatic Competition	
Sofia		Alejandro Doria	Alejandro Doria	New Argentine Cinema	
South of Reno		Mark Rezyka	T.L. Lankford, Mark Rezyka	Dramatic Competition	
The Steel Helmet		Samuel Fuller	Samuel Fuller	Tribute to Samuel Fuller	
Superstar: The Karen Carpenter Story		Todd Haynes	Todd Haynes, Cynthia Schneider	Rogues Gallery: New American Shorts	
Tangos, the Exile of Gardel	Tangos: el exilio de Gardel	Fernando Solanas	Jacobo Langsner	New Argentine Cinema	
Tapeheads		Bill Fishman	Bill Fishman, Peter McCarthy	Premieres	
Thy Kingdom Come, Thy Will Be Done		Antony Thomas		Documentary Competition	
Underworld U.S.A.		Samuel Fuller	Samuel Fuller	Tribute to Samuel Fuller	
Verboten!		Samuel Fuller	Samuel Fuller	Tribute to Samuel Fuller	
Walking on Water		Ramon Menendez	Ramon Menendez, Tom Musca	Dramatic Competition	
Where the Heart Roams		George Paul Csicsery		Documentary Competition	
Whimsy		Dorna Khazeni		Rogues Gallery: New American Shorts	
White Dog		Samuel Fuller		Tribute to Samuel Fuller	
Whitney, John's		John Whitney		Shorts	
Who Gets to Water the Grass		Luis Meza		Rogues Gallery: New American Shorts	

== 1989 ==
Dates: January 20 – January 29; United States Film Festival

Film name (English)	Film name (Non-English)	Directed By	Written By	Category	Awards
84 Charlie Mopic		Patrick Sheane Duncan	Patrick Sheane Duncan	Dramatic Competition	
Apartment Zero	Conviviendo con la muerte	Martin Donovan	Martin Donovan, David Koepp	Dramatic Competition	
Behind the Screen		Charlie Chaplin	Charlie Chaplin	Charlie Chaplin: A Centennial Celebration	
The Big Dis		Gordon Eriksen, John O'Brien	Gordon Eriksen, John O'Brien	Dramatic Competition	
The Big Picture		Christopher Guest	Michael Varhol, Christopher Guest, Michael McKean	Premieres	
A Bitter Message of Hopeless Grief		Jon Reiss		Shorts	
Cheap Shots		Jerry Stoeffhaas, Jeff Ureles	Jerry Stoeffhaas, Jeff Ureles	Dramatic Competition	
Chet's Romance		Bertrand Fevre		Shorts	
A Child Is Waiting		John Cassavetes	Abby Mann	Tribute to John Cassavetes	
Clownhouse		Victor Salva	Victor Salva	Dramatic Competition	
Comic Book Confidential		Ron Mann	Ron Mann	Documentary Competition	
Coming Out		Ted Reed		Documentary Competition	
Cover Up: Behind the Iran-Contra Affair		Barbara Trent, David Kasper	Eve Goldberg	Documentary Competition	
Crime in the Streets		Don Siegel	Reginald Rose	Tribute to John Cassavetes	
A Day's Pleasure		Charlie Chaplin	Charlie Chaplin	Charlie Chaplin: A Centennial Celebration	
Dead Man Out		Richard Pearce	Ron Hutchinson	Premieres	
Edge of the City		Martin Ritt	Robert Allan Arthur	Tribute to John Cassavetes	
Eyeplay		Andrew Langton		Rogues Gallery: New American Shorts	
Fable of the Beautiful Pigeon Fancier	Fabula de la Bella Palomera	Ruy Guerra	Ruy Guerra, Gabriel García Márquez	Dangerous Loves	
Faces		John Cassavetes	John Cassavetes	Tribute to John Cassavetes	
Flying Blind		Vince DiPersio	Vince DiPersio	Special Screenings	
For All Mankind		Al Reinert		Documentary Competition	Grand Jury Prize: Documentary, Audience Award: Documentary
Funny		Bran Ferren		Documentary Competition	
Ginger Ale Afternoon		Rafal Zielinski	Gina Wendkos	Dramatic Competition	
Gloria		John Cassavetes	John Cassavetes	Tribute to John Cassavetes	
The Haircut		Tamar Hoffs	Tamar Hoffs	Tribute to John Cassavetes	
A Happy Sunday	Un Domingo Feliz	Olegario Barrera	Eliseo Alberto, Olegario Barrera	Dangerous Loves	
Heathers		Michael Lehmann	Daniel Waters	Dramatic Competition	
Heavy Petting		Obie Benz, Joshua Waletzky		Documentary Competition	
Homesick		Johanna Demetrakas	Robert Gordon	Discovery Program (Shorts)	
How to Kiss		Bill Plympton	Bill Plympton	Shorts	
Husbands		John Cassavetes	John Cassavetes	Tribute to John Cassavetes	
I'm the One You're Looking For	Yo Soy El Que Tu Buscas	Jaime Chávarri	Jaime Chávarri, Juan Tébar	Dangerous Loves	
Isadora Duncan: Movement from the Soul		Dan Geller, Dayna Goldfine		Documentary Competition	
John Huston		Frank Martin	Martin and Charles Beagelman	Documentary Competition	Filmmakers Trophy: Documentary
Journey to Spirit Island		László Pal	László Pal, Crane Webster	Special Screenings	
The Killing of a Chinese Bookie		John Cassavetes	John Cassavetes	Tribute to John Cassavetes	
La Ofrenda: The Days of the Dead		Lourdes Portillo, Susanna Munoz		Documentary Competition	
The Laser Man		Peter Wang	Peter Wang	Dramatic Competition	
Let’s Get Lost		Bruce Weber		Documentary Competition	
Letters from the Park	Cartas del Parque	Tomás Gutiérrez Alea	Tomás Gutiérrez Alea, Gabriel García Márquez, Eliseo Alberto Diego	Dangerous Loves	
Lighting over Braddock: A Rust Bowl Fantasy		Tony Buba		Documentary Competition	
Limelight		Charlie Chaplin	Charlie Chaplin	Charlie Chaplin: A Centennial Celebration	
Lobster Man from Mars		Stanley Sheff	Stanley Sheff, Bob Greenberg	Dramatic Competition	
Lodz Ghetto		Alan Adelson, Kate Taverna	Alan Adelson	Documentary Competition	
Love Streams		John Cassavetes	Ted Allan, John Cassavetes	Tribute to John Cassavetes	
Mikey and Nicky		Elaine May	Elaine May	Tribute to John Cassavetes	
Minnie and Moskowitz		John Cassavetes	John Cassavetes	Tribute to John Cassavetes	
Miracle in Rome	Milagro en Roma	Lisandro Duque Naranjo	Lisandro Duque Naranjo	Dangerous Loves	
Miracle Mile		Steve De Jarnatt	Steve De Jarnatt	Dramatic Competition	
Morgan’s Cake		Rick Schmidt	Rick Schmidt	Dramatic Competition	
Motel		Christian Blackwood		Documentary Competition	
Mr. Fixit		Topper Lillien	Topper Lillien	Discovery Program (Shorts)	
Muddy Hands		Evan Dunsky		Rogues Gallery: New American Shorts	
Murderers Among Us: The Simon Wiesenthal Story		Brian Gibson		Premieres	
Of Men and Angels		William Farley	Marjorie Berger, William Farley, Deborah Rogin	Dramatic Competition	
One A.M.		Charlie Chaplin	Charlie Chaplin	Charlie Chaplin: A Centennial Celebration	
One Day the Refrigerator Broke		Eric Mueller		Rogues Gallery: New American Shorts	
Open Window		Rupert Wainwright	Rupert Wainwright	Discovery Program (Shorts)	
Opening Night		John Cassavetes	John Cassavetes	Tribute to John Cassavetes	
The Pawnshop		Charlie Chaplin	Charlie Chaplin	Charlie Chaplin: A Centennial Celebration	
Peacemaker		Jonathan Sanger	Jana Sue Memel, Jonathan Sanger, Robert N. Skir	Discovery Program (Shorts)	
The Personal Life of Mr. Phelps		David E. Tolchinsky	David E. Tolchinsky	Rogues Gallery: New American Shorts	
Portrait of Imogen		Meg Partridge		Shorts	
Powwow Highway		Jonathan Wacks	Janet Heaney, Jean Stawarz	Dramatic Competition	Filmmakers Trophy: Dramatic
Prisoners of Inertia		Jeff Scher	Jeff Scher	Dramatic Competition	
The Rink		Charlie Chaplin	Charlie Chaplin	Charlie Chaplin: A Centennial Celebration	
The Roommate		Oley Sassone	David DuBos	Shorts	
Saint Catherine’s Wedding Ring		Debra Kahn, Dave Edelson		Shorts	
Sex, Lies, and Videotape		Steven Soderbergh	Steven Soderbergh	Dramatic Competition	Audience Award: Dramatic
Shadows		John Cassavetes	Robert Alan Aurthur, John Cassavetes	Tribute to John Cassavetes	
Short-Term Bonds		Michael H. Lengsfield		Shorts	
A Slice of Life		William Kent		Shorts	
Some Girls		Michael Hoffman	Rupert Walters	Special Screenings	
Soviet Power		Marina Goldovskaya			
The Summer of Miss Forbes	El Verano de la Senora Forbes	Jaime Humberto Hermosillo	Jaime Humberto Hermosillo	Dangerous Loves	
Sunnyside		Charlie Chaplin	Charlie Chaplin	Charlie Chaplin: A Centennial Celebration	
Sunrise		F.W. Murnau	Carl Mayer	Retrospective	Opening Night
Swimming		Daniel Algrant		Shorts	
Teach 109		Richard Kletter	Richard Kletter	Discovery Program (Shorts)	
Tempest		Paul Mazursky	Leon Capetanos, Paul Mazursky	Tribute to John Cassavetes	
That's Adequate		Harry Hurwitz	Harry Hurwitz	Dramatic Competition	
Thelonious Monk: Straight, No Chaser		Charlotte Zwerin		Premieres	
They Haven't Seen This...		Eric Bergren	Eric Bergren	Discovery Program (Shorts)	
Those Guys		Chris Matheson		Rogues Gallery: New American Shorts	
Too Late Blues		John Cassavetes	Richard Carr, John Cassavetes		Tribute to John Cassavetes
Tracks		Rupert A. Nadeau	Rupert A. Nadeau	Shorts	
True Love		Nancy Savoca	Nancy Savoca, Richard Guay	Dramatic Competition	Grand Jury Prize: Dramatic
Trust Me		Robert Houston	Robert Houston	Special Screenings	
Two-Lane Blacktop		Monte Hellman		Special Events	
Tzara and Joyce		Todd O'Connell		Rogues Gallery: New American Shorts	
A Very Old Man with Enormous Wings	Un Senior Muy Viejo con Unas Alas Enormes	Fernando Birri	Fernando Birri	Dangerous Loves	
Who Killed Vincent Chin?		Renee Tajima-Peña, Christine Choy		Documentary Competition	
A Woman Under the Influence		John Cassavetes	John Cassavetes	Tribute to John Cassavetes	
Yosemite: The Fate of Heaven		Jon H. Else	Jon H. Else	Premieres	
Zadar! Cow from Hell		Robert C. Hughes	Ian Shoales	Premieres	

== 1990 ==
Dates: January 19 – January 27; Sundance United States Film Festival

Film name (English)	Film name (Non-English)	Directed By	Written By	Category	Awards
The Accordionist's Wedding	La Boda del Accordeonista	Luis Fernando Bottia	Luis Fernando Bottia	Colombian Cinema: From Magic to Realism	
A Cup of Tea		Aviva Slesin		Aviva Slesin: The Long and Short of It	
Agnes Escapes from the Nursing Home		Eileen O'Meara	Eileen O'Meara	Shorts	
A Hard Day's Night		Richard Lester		Happy Birthday, Richard Lester!	
The Ambassador from India	El Embajador de la India	Mario Ribero Ferreira	Mário González	Colombian Cinema: From Magic to Realism	
Arcata Brain Closet		Steven Vander Meer	Steven Vander Meer	Shorts	
At Arm’s Length		Camilla Calamandrei		Shorts	
Berkeley in the Sixties		Mark Kitchell		Documentary Competition	
A Bird for All Seasons		Aviva Slesin		Aviva Slesin: The Long and Short of It	
Blind Curve		Gary Markowitz		Shorts	
Blue Lobster	Langosta Azul	Álvaro Cepeda Samudio		Colombian Cinema: From Magic to Realism	
The Blue Room		Cindy Canejo		Shorts	
Blue Steel		Kathryn Bigelow	Kathryn Bigelow, Eric Red	Premieres	
Cause and Effect		John Sanborn, Mary Perillo		Shorts	
Chameleon Street		Wendell B. Harris Jr.	Wendell B. Harris Jr.	Dramatic Competition	Grand Jury Prize: Dramatic
Cinema Paradiso		Giuseppe Tornatore	Giuseppe Tornatore	Special Screenings	
Conquering Space		Mark Stratton	Mark Stratton	The 1989/90 Discovery Program (Shorts)	
Current Events		Ralph Arlyck		Documentary Competition	
Dance of Hope		Deborah Shaffer		Documentary Competition	
Dancing for Mr. B.: Six Balanchine Ballerinas		Anne Belle, Deborah Dickson		Documentary Competition	
The Day You Love Me	El Dia Que Me Quieras	Sergio Dow	José Ignacio Cabrujas, Sergio Dow	Colombian Cinema: From Magic to Realism	
Denial		Erin Dignam	Erin Dignam	Dramatic Competition	
Details of a Duel: A Question of Honor	Tecnicas de Duelo	Sergio Cabrera	Humberto Dorado	Colombian Cinema: From Magic to Realism	
Dog of Paris		Chris Hume		Shorts	
The Dogs		Aviva Slesin		Aviva Slesin: The Long and Short of It	
Duck, You Sucker		Sergio Leone		Gone But Not Forgotten	
First Love		Aviva Slesin		Aviva Slesin: The Long and Short of It	
Four from the New Yorker		Aviva Slesin		Aviva Slesin: The Long and Short of It	
Funky Beat		Melvin Van Peebles		Celebrating Melvin Van Peebles	
H-2 Worker		Stephanie Black		Documentary Competition	Grand Jury Prize: Documentary
Hairway to the Stars				Shorts	
He Was Once		Mary Hestand	Mary Hestand	Rogues Gallery (Shorts)	
Hollywood Mavericks		Florence Dauman, Dale Ann Stieber		Special Screenings	
Home		Sandy Perlbinder		Shorts	
The Horseplayer		Kurt Voss	David Birke, Larry Rattner	Dramatic Competition	
House Party		Reginald Hudlin	Reginald Hudlin	Dramatic Competition	
How I Won the War		Richard Lester		Happy Birthday, Richard Lester!	
How to Be Louise		Anne Flournoy	Anne Flournoy	Dramatic Competition	
I.F. Stone's Weekly		Jerry Bruck		Gone But Not Forgotten	
Identity Crisis		Melvin Van Peebles	Mario Van Peebles	Celebrating Melvin Van Peebles	
In the Blood		George Butler		Documentary Competition	
Interview with Anne Frank		Donnell Corelle		Shorts	
Iron & Silk		Shirley Sun	Mark Salzman	Dramatic Competition	
James Baldwin: The Price of the Ticket		Karen Thorsen		Documentary Competition	
The Kill-Off		Maggie Greenwald	Maggie Greenwald	Dramatic Competition	
The Killer	Dip huet seung hung	John Woo	John Woo	Special Screenings	
The Knack... and How to Get It		Richard Lester		Happy Birthday, Richard Lester!	
Last Images of the Shipwreck		Eliseo Subiela	Eliseo Subiela	Special Screenings	
The Last Smoker	Der letzte Raucher	Jürgen Podzkiewitz		Special Screenings	
The Last Stop		Serik Aprimov	Serik Aprimov	Kazakhstan New Wave	
The Lathe of Heaven		David Loxton, Fred Barzyk		Gone But Not Forgotten	
Law of the Jungle	La Ley del Monte	Alberto Mariscal		Colombian Cinema: From Magic to Realism	
Little Feet		Connie Grappo		The 1989/90 Discovery Program (Shorts)	
Little Fish in Love		Abai Karpykov	Abai Karpykov	Kazakhstan New Wave	
The Long Way Home		Michael Apted		Special Screenings	
Longtime Companion		Norman René	Craig Lucas	Dramatic Competition	Audience Award: Dramatic
Love at Large		Alan Rudolph	Alan Rudolph	Premieres	
Love, Women and Flowers	Amor, Mujeres y Flores	Marta Rodríguez, Jorge Silva		Colombian Cinema: From Magic to Realism	
A Man of Principle	Condores No Entierran Todos Los Dias	Francisco Norden	Gustavo Álvarez Gardeazábal	Colombian Cinema: From Magic to Realism	
Manchild		Gordon Eriksen, David Chan		Shorts	
Manic Denial		Hal Rucker		Shorts	
A Matter of Degrees		W.T. Morgan	W.T. Morgan	Dramatic Competition	
Metamorphosis: Man into Woman		Lisa Leeman		Documentary Competition	
Metropolitan		Whit Stillman	Whit Stillman	Dramatic Competition	
Mortal Passions		Andrew Lane	Alan Moskowitz	Dramatic Competition	
Mr. Hoover and I		Emile de Antonio		Documentary Competition	
My Degeneration		Jon Moritsugu	Daryl Chin, Jon Moritsugu	Rogues Gallery (Shorts)	
Myriam's Look	La Mirada de Myriam	Clara Riascos		Colombian Cinema: From Magic to Realism	
The Natural History of Parking Lots		Everett Lewis	Everett Lewis	Dramatic Competition	
The Needle		Rashid Nugmanov	Alexander Baranov, Bakhyt Kilibaev	Premieres	
Never Leave Nevada		Steve Swartz	Steve Swartz	Dramatic Competition	
No More Disguises		Tom Sigel, Boryana Varbanov		Shorts	
No Pain, No Gain		Tom Brozovich		Shorts	
Nuestra Maquina		Karen Kennedy		Shorts	
On Ice		Andrew Takeuchi, Grover Babcock		Shorts	
The Other Side of the Moon		Mickey Lemle		Documentary Competition	
Painting the Town		Andrew Behar		Documentary Competition	
Petulia		Richard Lester		Happy Birthday, Richard Lester!	
The Plot Against Harry		Michael Roemer	Michael Roemer	Dramatic Competition	
Preston Sturges		Kenneth Bowser		Documentary Competition	
Reborn	Nacer de Nuevo	Marta Rodriguez	Marta Rodriguez	Colombian Cinema: From Magic to Realism	
Robin and Marian		Richard Lester	James Goldman	Happy Birthday, Richard Lester!	
Rock		Alexei Uchitel	Yuri Filinov	Special Screenings	
Rodrigo D: (No Future)	Rodrigo D. (No Futuro)	Víctor Gaviria	Víctor Gaviria	Colombian Cinema: From Magic to Realism	
Roger and Me		Michael Moore		Premieres	
Samsara: Death and Rebirth in Cambodia		Ellen Bruno		Documentary Competition	
Sapphire Man		Craig Bolotin	Craig Bolotin	The 1989/90 Discovery Program (Shorts)	
Seasick on Dry Land		Ilana Shulman		Shorts	
Secret Wedding		Alejandro Agresti	Alejandro Agresti	Special Screenings	
Shut-In	Trancado	Arthur Fontes		Country Focus	
Son of Jonah		Sam Dunn		Shorts	
Sophisticated Gents		Harry Falk		Celebrating Melvin Van Peebles	
Soulmate		Lincoln Hiatt		Shorts	
The Spider Game	Pisigana	Leopoldo Pinzon		Colombian Cinema: From Magic to Realism	
Stanley & Iris		Martin Ritt		Premieres	Opening Night
The Story of a Three-Day Pass	La permission	Melvin Van Peebles		Celebrating Melvin Van Peebles	
Suelto		Chris Emmanouilides, Tim Sexton		Shorts	
The Summer Heat		Derezhan Omirbaev	Derezhan Omirbaev, Leila Akhinzhanova	Kazakhstan New Wave	
Sunlight		Melvin Van Peebles		Celebrating Melvin Van Peebles	
Sweet Sweetback's Baadassss Song		Melvin Van Peebles		Celebrating Melvin Van Peebles	
Sweetie		Jane Campion	Gerard Lee, Jane Campion	Special Screenings	
Teatro!		Ruth Shapiro, Edward Burke, Pamela Yates		Documentary Competition	
The Ten-Year Lunch: Wit and Legend of the Algonquin Round Table		Aviva Slesin		Aviva Slesin: The Long and Short of It	
That Grip		Greg Grieg		Shorts	
Three Pickup Men for Herrick		Melvin Van Peebles		Celebrating Melvin Van Peebles	
The Three	Fofan	Alexander Baranov, Bakhyt Kilibaev	Alexander Baranov, Bakhyt Kilibaev	Kazakhstan New Wave	
A Time to Die	Tiempo de Morir	Jorge Ali Triana		Colombian Cinema: From Magic to Realism	
To Protect Mother Earth		Joel L. Freedman		Documentary Competition	
To the Moon, Alice		Jessie Nelson	Jessie Nelson	The 1989/90 Discovery Program (Shorts)	
Toro		Talgat Temenov	Nadezhda Kozhushannaya, Talgat Temenov	Kazakhstan New Wave	
The Unbelievable Truth		Hal Hartley	Hal Hartley	Dramatic Competition	
Vienna Is Different		Susan Korda, David W. Leitner		Documentary Competition	
Visa U.S.A.		Lisandro Duque Naranjo	Lisandro Duque Naranjo	Colombian Cinema: From Magic to Realism	
Waldo Salt: A Screenwriter's Journey		Eugene Corr	Eugene Corr, Michael Chandler	Gone But Not Forgotten	
Water and Power		Pat O'Neill		Documentary Competition	Grand Jury Prize: Documentary
Watermelon Man		Melvin Van Peebles		Celebrating Melvin Van Peebles	
The Way of the Wicked		Christine Vachon	Christine Vachon	Rogues Gallery (Shorts)	
Winterwheat		Mark Street		Shorts	
Wonderland, U.S.A.		Zoe Beloff		Shorts	
Ya-Ha		Rashid Nugmanov	Rashid Nugmanov	Kazakhstan New Wave	

== 1991 ==
Dates: January 17 – January 27; Sundance Film Festival

Film name (English)	Film name (Non-English)	Directed By	Written By	Category	Awards
100 N.Y., N.Y.		Kyle Kibbe		Shorts	
122 Webster		Pat Baum, Daniel Robin		Shorts	
12:01 PM		Jonathan Heap	Stephen Tolkin, Jonathan Heap	The 1991 Discovery Program (Shorts)	
3 Women		Robert Altman	Robert Altman	A Salute to Robert Altman	
Absolutely Positive		Peter Adair		Documentary Competition	
After the Storm	Después de la tormenta	Tristan Bauer		Images of Mexico and Latin America	
Afternoon Breezes		Hitoshi Yazaki	Hitoshi Yazaki	A New Generation of Japanese Cinema	
All the Vermeers in New York		Jon Jost	Jon Jost	Dramatic Competition	
Alaska		Mike Van Diem	Mike Van Diem, Paul Ruven	New! Shorts	
Amazonia: Voices From the Rain Forest		Monti Aguirre, Glenn Switkes	Monti Aguirre, Glenn Switkes, Michael Rudnick	Documentary Competition	
American Dream		Barbara Kopple		Documentary Competition	Grand Jury Prize: Documentary
Archangel		Guy Maddin	Guy Maddin, George Toles	Park City at Midnight	
Barbosa		Jorge Furtado, Ana Luiza Azevedo		Rogues of Latin America: Casa de Cinema (Shorts)	
Belle de Jour		Luis Buñuel	Luis Buñuel	Special Screenings	
Bicycle Sighs		Sion Sono	Sion Sono, Saito Hitashi	A New Generation of Japanese Cinema	
Blood in the Face		Anne Bohlen, Kevin Rafferty, James Ridgeway		Documentary Competition	
Broken Angel		Margot Niederland		Shorts	
Broken Meat		Pola Rapaport		Documentary Competition	
Cadence		Martin Sheen	Dennis Shryack	Special Screenings	
Christo in Paris		Albert Maysles, Susan Froemke, Deborah Dickson, David Maysles		Documentary Competition	
City of Hope		John Sayles	John Sayles	Premieres	
Come Back to the 5 & Dime, Jimmy Dean, Jimmy Dean		Robert Altman	Robert Altman	A Salute to Robert Altman	
Coney Island		Ric Burns	Richard Snow	Documentary Competition	
Cool Water		Kahane Corn		Shorts	
Daughters of the Dust		Julie Dash	Julie Dash	Dramatic Competition	
The Day Dorival Faced the Guard		Jorge Furtado, José Pedro Goulart		Rogues of Latin America: Casa de Cinema (Shorts)	
Dimwit's Day		Luke Jaeger	Luke Jaeger	Shorts	
Dr. Petiot	Docteur Petiot	Christian de Chalonge		Premieres	
The Enchantment		Nagasaki Shunichi		A New Generation of Japanese Cinema	
End of the Night		Keith McNally	Keith McNally	Dramatic Competition	
Enid Is Sleeping		Maurice Phillips	A.J. Tipping, James Whaley, and Maurice Phillips	Premieres	
Fallen from Heaven	Caidos del Cielo	Francisco José Lombardi	Augusto Cabada, Giovanna Pollarolo	Images of Mexico and Latin America	
The Flat		Jan Švankmajer		Banned Films: Czech Verite	
Glycerine Tears		Michael Miner		New! Shorts	
The Golden Boat		Raúl Ruiz	Raúl Ruiz	Park City at Midnight	
Gone to Earth		Powell and Pressburger		Gone But Not Forgotten	
The Grifters		Stephen Frears	Donald E. Westlake	Premieres	Opening Night
Hangin' with the Homeboys		Joseph Vásquez	Joseph Vásquez	Dramatic Competition	Waldo Salt Screenwriting Award (ex-aequo)
Heart of the Deal		Yuri Neyman, Marina Levikova	Gregg Bryan Goldman	The 1991 Discovery Program (Shorts)	
Hello Mary		Cort Tramontin		New! Shorts	
House without a Home		Chris Hume		Shorts	
In the Shadow of the Stars: The Lives of Singers		Allie Light, Irving Saraf		Documentary Competition	
Intimacy	Intimidad	Dana Rotberg	Leonardo García Tsao	Images of Mexico and Latin America	
Iron Maze		Hiroaki Yoshida		Dramatic Competition	
Island of Flowers		Jorge Furtado		Rogues of Latin America: Casa de Cinema (Shorts)	
J.S. Bach Fantasy in C Minor		Jan Švankmajer		Banned Films: Czech Verite	
Jaguar		Calton Chase		Shorts	
The Juniper Tree		Nietzchka Keene	Nietzchka Keene	Dramatic Competition	
Kitchen Sink		Alison Maclean	Alison Maclean	Short	
Lava, Jr.		Randy Bauer	Randy Bauer	Shorts with Features	
Legends		Ilana Bar-Din		Documentary Competition	
The Life and Death of Colonel Blimp		Powell and Pressburger	Powell and Pressburger	Gone But Not Forgotten	
Little Feet		Connie Grappo	Connie Grappo	The 1991 Discovery Program (Shorts)	
Little Noises		Jane Spencer	Jane Spencer	Dramatic Competition	
A Little Stiff		Caveh Zahedi, Greg Watkins, Gregory H. Watkins	Caveh Zahedi, Greg Watkins, Gregory H. Watkins	Dramatic Competition	
Lola		María Novaro	Beatriz Novaro, María Novaro	Images of Mexico and Latin America	
Margarit and Margarita		Nikolai Volev		Banned Films: Czech Verite	
Maria's Story		Pamela Cohen, Monona Wali		Documentary Competition	
The Mass		Dušan Hanák		Banned Films: Czech Verite	
A Matter of Life and Death		Michael Powell		Gone But Not Forgotten	
McCabe & Mrs. Miller		Robert Altman	Robert Altman	A Salute to Robert Altman	
Memory		Roberto Henkin		Rogues of Latin America: Casa de Cinema (Shorts)	
Mindwalk		Bernt Capra	Floyd Byars	Premieres	
Missing Parents		Martin Nicholson	Nevin Schreiner	The 1991 Discovery Program (Shorts)	
The Most Important Thing in Life				Rogues of Latin America: Casa de Cinema (Shorts)	
Naked Tango		Leonard Schrader	Leonard Schrader	Premieres	
Nashville		Robert Altman	Robert Altman	A Salute to Robert Altman	
The New Morning of Billy the Kid		Naoto Yamakawa	Naoto Yamakawa, Genichiro Takahashi	A New Generation of Japanese Cinema	
Nowon		Peter Judson	Peter Judson	Shorts	
Nut Feed		Verna Huiskamp		Shorts	
Obscenities		Roberto Henkin		Rogues of Latin America: Casa de Cinema (Shorts)	
Old Shatterhand Has Come to See Us		Dušan Hanák		Banned Films: Czech Verite	
Once Around		Lasse Hallström	Malia Scotch Marmo	Premieres	Opening Night
Once in a Blue Moon		Charley Lang	Nadine Van der Velde	The 1991 Discovery Program (Shorts)	
One Cup of Coffee		Robin Armstrong	David Eyre Jr.	Dramatic Competition	Audience Award: Dramatic
Over the Threshold		Christine Lloyd-Fitt, Yoshi Tezuka		A New Generation of Japanese Cinema	
Paradise View	Paradaisu byû	Gō Takamine	Gō Takamine	A New Generation of Japanese Cinema	
Paris Is Burning		Jennie Livingston		Documentary Competition	Grand Jury Prize: Documentary
Partita		Francesca Talenti		Shorts	
The Passion of Martin		Alexander Payne	Alexander Payne	New! Shorts	
Peering from the Moon		Henry Chow	Henry Chow, Joslyn Grieve	New! Shorts	
Pictures of the Old World		Dušan Hanák		Banned Films: Czech Verite	
Poison		Todd Haynes	Todd Haynes	Dramatic Competition	Grand Jury Prize: Dramatic
Pool of Thanatos		Peter McCandless		New! Shorts	
Popeye		Robert Altman	Robert Altman	A Salute to Robert Altman	
Post No Bills		Clay Walker, Marianne Desard		Shorts	
Prison Stories: Women on the Inside		Donna Deitch, Penelope Spheeris, Joan Micklin Silver	Martin Jones, Marlane Meyer, Jule Selbo, Dick Beebe	Special Screenings	
Privilege		Yvonne Rainer	Yvonne Rainer	Dramatic Competition	
Prophets and Loss		Gabrielle Kelly, Nick Hart-Williams			
Providence		David Mackay	David Mackay, Bruce Miller	New! Shorts	
Queen of Diamonds		Nina Menkes	Nina Menkes	Dramatic Competition	
Raspad		Mikhail Belikov		Banned Films: Czech Verite	
Red Dawn	Rojo Amanecer	Jorge Fons	Xavier Robles, Guadalupe Ortega Vargas	Images of Mexico and Latin America	
Requiem for Dominic		Robert Dornhelm	Michael Kohlmeier, Felix Mitterer	Special Screenings	
The Restless Conscience		Hava Kohav Beller	Hava Kohav Beller	Shorts	
Sea of Oil		M.R. Katzke	M.R. Katzke	Shorts	
Secondary Roles	Papeles Secundarios	Orlando Rojas	Oswaldo Delgado Sánchez	Images of Mexico and Latin America	
Short of Breath		Jay Rosenblatt	Jay Rosenblatt	Shorts	
Slacker		Richard Linklater	Richard Linklater	Dramatic Competition	
Slow Bob in the Lower Dimensions		Henry Selick		Shorts	
Step Off a Ten-Foot Platform with Your Clothes On		Scott Miller		Shorts	
Straight Out of Brooklyn		Matty Rich	Matty Rich	Dramatic Competition	
Sure Fire		Jon Jost		Dramatic Competition	
Swan Lake: The Zone		Yuri Ilyenko	Sergei Paradjanov, Yuri Illyenko	Park City at Midnight	
Takeover		Pamela Yates		Documentary Competition	
The Tales of Hoffmann		Powell and Pressburger		Gone But Not Forgotten	
The Talking Rain		Sam Wells		Shorts	
Tanner '88		Robert Altman	Robert Altman	A Salute to Robert Altman	
Tetsuo		Shinya Tsukamoto	Shinya Tsukamoto	A New Generation of Japanese Cinema	
Thank You and Good Night		Jan Oxenberg		Documentary Competition	
That Burning Question		Alan Taylor	Alan Taylor	New! Shorts	
The Thief of Baghdad		Ludwig Berger, Michael Powell, Tim Whelan		Gone But Not Forgotten	
To Sleep, So As to Dream		Kaizo Hayashi		A New Generation of Japanese Cinema	
Transparent Woman	Mujer Transparente	Orlando Rojas, Mario Crespo, Ana Rodríguez, Mayra Segura, Mayra Valasi, Héctor Veitia		Images of Mexico and Latin America	
Trouble Behind		Robby Henson		Documentary Competition	
Truly, Madly, Deeply		Anthony Minghella	Anthony Minghella		
Trust		Hal Hartley	Hal Hartley	Dramatic Competition	Waldo Salt Screenwriting Award (ex-aequo)
Twenty-One		Don Boyd	Don Boyd, Zoë Heller	Dramatic Competition	
Uminchu: The Old Man and the East China Sea		John Junkerman		A New Generation of Japanese Cinema	
Untama Giru		Go Takamine	Go Takamine	A New Generation of Japanese Cinema	
All the Vermeer in New York		Jon Jost			
Vincent & Theo		Robert Altman	Julian Mitchell	Premieres	
Visions of Marie		James Whitney		Shorts	
Walls in the Woods		Sal Giammona		Shorts	
Waltz in Old Havana		Luis Felipe Bernaza			
White Lies	Mentiras Piadosas	Arturo Ripstein	Paz Alicia Garciadiego	Images of Mexico and Latin America	
Whore		Ken Russell	Ken Russell, Deborah Dalton	Premieres	
Winged Headhunter		Péter Reich		New! Shorts	
Zazie		Riju Go	Riju Go	A New Generation of Japanese Cinema	

== 1992 ==
Dates: January 19 – January 27

Film name (English)	Film name (Non-English)	Directed By	Written By	Category	Awards
2001: A Space Odyssey		Stanley Kubrick	Stanley Kubrick, Arthur C. Clarke	Retrospective	
901, After Forty-Five Years of Working		Eames Demetrios		Documentary short	
Adorable Lies	Adorables Metiras	Gerardo Chijona	Gerardo Chijona, Senel Paz		
The Air Globes	Cartas al Niño Dios	Patricia Cardoso	Patricia Cardoso	Short	
Air Time		Gary Fleder		Park City at Midnight	
Angry		Nicole Holofcener		Short	
Anima Mundi		Godfrey Reggio		Documentary Shorts	
Asylum		Joan Churchill		Documentary Competition	
Backyard Movie		Bruce Weber			
Birch Street Gym		Stephen Kessler		Short	
Black and White				Dramatic Competition	
A Blink of Paradise		Karen Young			
A Brief History of Time		Errol Morris		Documentary Competition	Grand Jury Prize: Documentary
Brother's Keeper		Joe Berlinger, Bruce Sinofsky		Documentary Competition	
The Cabinet of Dr. Ramirez		Peter Sellars	Peter Sellars, Joan Cusack	Premieres	
Caravaggio		Derek Jarman			
Carne		Gaspar Noé	Gaspar Noé	Park City at Midnight	
Clearcut		Ryszard Bugajski	M. T. Kelly, Robert Forsyth		
A Clockwork Orange		Stanley Kubrick		Retrospective	
Color Adjustment: Blacks in Prime Time		Marlon Riggs		Documentary Competition	
Complaints		David Weissman		Short	
Confession to Laura	Confesion a Laura	Jaime Osorio Gómez	Alexandra Cardona Restrepo		
Contact		Jonathan Darby	Jonathan Darby	Animated	
Daily Rains		Cauleen Smith	Cauleen Smith	Documentary Shorts	
Danzón		Maria Novaro	Beatriz Novaro, María Novaro	Premieres	
Death by Unnatural Causes		Karen Bellone, Lisa Rinzler		Documentary Shorts	
Deep Blues: A Musical Pilgrimage to the Crossroads		Robert Mugge	Robert Palmer	Documentary Competition	
Delicatessen		Jean-Pierre Jeunet, Marc Caro	Gilles Adrien, Marc Caro, Jean-Pierre Jeunet	Park City at Midnight	
Desperate		Rico Martinez	Rico Martinez	Dramatic Competition	
Distant Voices, Still Lives		Terence Davies	Terence Davies		
Distant Water		Carlos Avila	Carlos Avila	Documentary Shorts	
Edward II		Derek Jarman	Derek Jarman	Premieres	
Empire of the Moon		Kristine Samuelson, John Haptas		Documentary Shorts	
Fathers and Sons		Paul Mones	Paul Mones		
Fifteenth Phase of the Moon		Mark Amos Nealey		Short	
Finding Christa		Camille Billops, James Hatch		Documentary Competition	
Flames of Passion		Richard Kwietniowski			
Fool's Fire		Julie Taymor	Julie Taymor	Premieres	
Gas Food Lodging		Allison Anders	Allison Anders	Dramatic Competition	
The Godson		William Szarka			
Hallelujah Anyhow		Matthew Jacobs		Short	
Hard Core Home Movie		Greta Snider		Documentary Shorts	
Hear My Song		Peter Chelsom	Peter Chelsom	Premieres	
Highway 61		Bruce McDonald	Bruce McDonald, Don McKellar, Allan Magee	Park City at Midnight	
Homo Videocus		Hyuk Byun, Je-yong Lee	Hyuk Byun, Je-yong Lee	Short	
The Hours and Times		Christopher Münch	Christopher Münch		
I'm British But…		Gurinder Chadha		Documentary Shorts	
In and Out of Time		Elizabeth Finlayson	Elizabeth Finlayson	Documentary Shorts	
In Search of Our Fathers		Marco Williams		Documentary Competition	
In the Soup		Alexandre Rockwell	Tim Kissell, Alexandre Rockwell	Dramatic Competition	Grand Jury Prize: Dramatic
Incident at Oglala		Michael Apted			
The Inland Sea		Lucille Carra	Donald Ritchie	Documentary Competition	
Innocents Abroad		Les Blank, Miel Van Hoogenbemt		Documentary Competition	
Intimate Stranger		Alan Berliner		Documentary Competition	
Into Your Guts		Chaim Bianco		Animated short	
Island Memory		Byron Spicer		Documentary Shorts	
It’s Like Lies . . .		Greg Cummins, Shawn McConneloug		Short	
Jo-Jo at the Gate of Lions		Britta Sjogren	Britta Sjogren		
Johnny Suede		Tom DiCillo	Tom DiCillo		
Ju Dou		Zhang Yimou, Yang Fengliang	Liu Heng		
Jumpin' at the Boneyard		Jeff Stanzler	Jeff Stanzler		
Kafka		Steven Soderbergh	Lem Dobbs	Premieres	
The Killing		Stanley Kubrick		Retrospective	
The Kiss		Pascale Ferran		Shorts	
The Last Harvest	La Ultima Siembra	Miguel Pereira			
Last Images of War		Stephen Olsson, Scott Andrews		Documentary Competition	
The Last Roundup		Paul Fox		Documentary Shorts	
Latino Bar		Paul Leduc			
The Letters from Moab		Mark Krenzien			
Light Sleeper		Paul Schrader	Paul Schrader	Premieres	
Listen Carefully		Robert Manganelli			
The Living End		Gregg Araki	Gregg Araki	Dramatic Competition	
Lolita		Stanley Kubrick		Retrospective	
London Kills Me		Hanif Kureishi		Premieres	
Low		James Herbert		Short	
Media Darling		Thad Povey		Documentary Shorts	
Memory Circus		Mary Kuryla		Short	
Mississippi Masala		Mira Nair	Sooni Taraporevala	Premieres	Opening Night
Monster in a Box		Nick Broomfield	Spalding Grey	Premieres	
The Most Beautiful Breasts in the World		Rainer Kaufmann		Short	
My Crasy Life		Jean-Pierre Gorin		Documentary	
Night on Earth		Jim Jarmusch	Jim Jarmusch	Premieres	
Old Well		Wu Tianming			
One & Eight		Zhang Junzhao			
Paths of Glory		Stanley Kubrick		Retrospective	
Play Is the Work of Children		John Axelrad, Stephen B. Lewis		Documentary Shorts	
Poison Ivy		Katt Shea	Katt Shea, Andy Ruben	Dramatic Competition	
The Potato Hunter		Timothy Lee Little		Short	
Proof		Jocelyn Moorhouse	Jocelyn Moorhouse		
Raise the Red Lantern		Zhang Yimou		Premieres	
Recovering Silver		Karen Kennedy		Short	
Red Sorghum		Zhang Yimou			
Relax		Christopher Newby		Short	
Reservoir Dogs		Quentin Tarantino	Quentin Tarantino	Dramatic Competition	
Resonance		Stephen Cummins		Short	
Revenge of the Occupant		Howard March		Short	
Revestriction		Barthelemy Bompard		Park City at Midnight	
Rock Soup		Lech Kowalski		Documentary Competition	
Rodney & Juliet		Fane Flaws		Short	
The Room		Jeff Balsmeyer		Short	
R.S.V.P.		Laurie Lynd		Short	
Salvation Guaranteed		Karen Ingham		Short	
Session Man		Seth Winston		Short	
Shoot for the Contents		Trinh T. Minh-ha		Documentary Competition	
Six Point Nine		Dan Bootzin		Short	
Some Divine Wind		Roddy Bogawa		Dramatic Competition	
Star Time		Alexander Cassini		Dramatic Competition	
Stealing Altitude		Roger Teich, John Starr		Documentary Shorts	
Storyville		Mark Frost	Mark Frost	Premieres	
Surfacing		Eric Martin		Documentary Shorts	
Swoon		Tom Kalin	Tom Kalin	Dramatic Competition	
Symbiopsychotaxiplasm: Take One		William Greaves		Special Screenings	
Tater Tomater		Phil Morrison		Short	
Techqua Ikachi: Land—My Life		James Danaqyumtewa, Agnes Barmettler, Anka Schmid		Documentary Competition	
Thanksgiving Prayer		Gus Van Sant		Short	
That Sinking Feeling		Cindy Canejo		Short	
There’s No Place Like Homegirl		Mike Costanza		Short	
This Is My Life		Nora Ephron	Nora Ephron, Delia Ephron	Premieres	Opening Night
Through an Open Window		Eric Mendelsohn		Short	
The Tune		Bill Plympton		Dramatic Competition	
Two Lies		Pamela Tom		Short	
Vegas in Space		Phillip R. Ford	Phillip R. Ford	Park City at Midnight	
Venus Peter		Ian Seller		Country Focus	
Washing Machine Guy		Dean Pitchford		Short	
The Waterdance		Neal Jimenez, Michael Steinberg	Neal Jimenez	Dramatic Competition	Audience Award: Dramatic, Waldo Salt Screenwriting Award
Where Are We?: Our Trip Through America		Jeffrey Friedman, Rob Epstein		Documentary Competition	
Without a Pass		Marco Williams		Short	
The Wounding		Susan Emerling		Short	
Yellow Earth		Chen Kaige/Zhang Yimou		Retrospective	
Young Soul Rebels		Isaac Julien		Country Focus	
Zebrahead		Anthony Drazan		Dramatic Competition	

== 1993 ==
Dates: January 21 – January 31

Film name (English)	Film name (Non-English)	Directed By	Written By	Category	Awards
Aileen Wuornos: The Selling of a Serial Killer		Nick Broomfield	Nick Broomfield	Documentary Competition	
Aisle Six		David Wain	David Wain	Shorts Program	
Amongst Friends		Rob Weiss	Rob Weiss	Dramatic Competition	
An Ambush of Ghosts		Everett Lewis, Judy Irola		Dramatic Competition	
Bodies, Rest & Motion		Michael Steinberg	Roger Hedden	Dramatic Competition	
Bottle Rocket		Wes Anderson	Owen Wilson, Wes Anderson	Shorts Program	
Boxing Helena		Jennifer Chambers Lynch	Jennifer Chambers Lynch		
Children of Fate		Andrew Young, Susan Todd (1991); Robert M. Young, Michael Roemer (1961)		Documentary Competition	
Cigarettes & Coffee		Paul Thomas Anderson	Paul Thomas Anderson	Shorts Program	
Combination Platter		Tony Chan	Edwin Baker, Tony Chan		Waldo Salt Screenwriting Award
Crush		Alison Maclean			
The Dark Side of the Heart		Eliseo Subiela			
Days of Being Wild		Wong Kar-wai			
Dead/Alive	Braindead	Peter Jackson		Park City at Midnight	
Delivered Vacant		Nora Jacobson		Documentary Competition	
Earth and the American Dream		Bill Couturie		Documentary Competition	
El Mariachi		Robert Rodriguez	Robert Rodriguez	Dramatic Competition	Audience Award: Dramatic
Fear of a Black Hat		Rusty Cundieff	Rusty Cundieff	Park City at Midnight	
From Hollywood to Hanoi		Tiana Thi Thanh Nga		Documentary Competition	
Hard Boiled		John Woo			
Hercules Returns		David Parker	Des Mangan	Park City at Midnight	
A Hero of Our Time		Michael Almereyda		Shorts Program	
Inside Monkey Zetterland		Jefery Levy			
Just Another Girl on the I.R.T.		Leslie Harris		Dramatic Competition	Special Jury Prize for Outstanding Achievement in a First Feature
The Last Days of Chez Nous		Gillian Armstrong			
The Life and Times of Allen Ginsberg		Jerry Aronson		Documentary	
Like Water for Chocolate	Como agua para chocolate	Alfonso Arau	Laura Esquivel	The Pan American Highway	
Lillian		David Williams	David Williams	Dramatic Competition	Special Jury Prize: Dramatic
Mi Vida Loca		Allison Anders		Premieres	
Naked in New York		Daniel Algrant			
Nitrate Kisses		Barbara Hammer			
Oedipus Rex		Julie Taymor			
Orlando		Sally Potter	Sally Potter		
Public Access		Bryan Singer	Bryan Singer, Christopher McQuarrie, Michael Feit Dougan	Dramatic Competition	Grand Jury Prize: Dramatic (ex-aequo)
Reality Bites		Ben Stiller	Helen Childress	Premieres	
Ruby in Paradise		Victor Nuñez	Victor Nuñez	Dramatic Competition	Grand Jury Prize: Dramatic (ex-aequo)
Silverlake Life: The View from Here		Tom Joslin, Peter Friedman		Documentary	
Tetsuo II: Body Hammer	鉄男2	Shinya Tsukamoto	Shinya Tsukamoto	Park City at Midnight	
Twenty Bucks		Keva Rosenfeld	Leslie Bohem, Endre Bohem		

== 1994 ==
Dates: January 20 – January 30

Film name (English)	Film name (Non-English)	Directed By	Written By	Category	Awards
Alice's Restaurant		Arthur Penn		Arthur Penn	
Anchoress		Chris Newby	Chris Newby		
Aswang		Wrye Martin, Barry Poltermann	Frank L. Anderson, Wrye Martin, Barry Poltermann	Park City at Midnight	
Avenue X		Leslie McCleave		Shorts	
Backbeat		Iain Softley	Iain Softley		
The Bed You Sleep In		Jon Jost			
The Blue Kite	Lan Fengzheng	Tian Zhuangzhuang	Mao Xiao	Premieres	
Boatman		Gianfranco Rosi		Documentary Competition	
Bonnie and Clyde		Arthur Penn	David Newman, Robert Benton	Arthur Penn	
Bullethead				Park City at Midnight	
Child Murders		Ildiko Szabo			
Clean, Shaven		Lodge Kerrigan	Lodge Kerrigan		
Clerks		Kevin Smith	Kevin Smith	Dramatic Competition	
Cronos		Guillermo del Toro	Guillermo del Toro	Special Screenings	
Dottie Gets Spanked		Todd Haynes	Todd Haynes	Shorts	
Fast Trip, Long Drop		Gregg Bordowitz		Documentary Competition	
Floundering		Peter McCarthy	Peter McCarthy		
Four Weddings and a Funeral		Mike Newell	Richard Curtis	Opening Night	
Freedom on My Mind		Connie Field		Documentary Competition	
Fresh		Boaz Yakin	Boaz Yakin	Dramatic Competition	
Fun		Rafal Zielinski		Dramatic Competition	
Go Fish		Rose Troche	Rose Troche, Guinevere Turner	Dramatic Competition	
Golden Gate		John Madden	David Henry Hwang	Premieres	
Grief		Richard Glatzer		Dramatic Competition	
Hoop Dreams		Steve James		Documentary Competition	Audience Award: Documentary
I Love a Man in Uniform		David Wellington	David Wellington	Special Screenings	
Ivan and Abraham		Yolande Zauberman		Country Focus	
Johnny 100 Pesos		Gustavo Graef Marino			
Killing Zoe		Roger Avary	Roger Avary	Special Screenings	
Lady		Ira Sachs	Dominique Dibbell	Park City at Midnight	
Makin' Up		Katja von Garnier		Country Focus	
The Making of... And God Spoke				Park City at Midnight	
Minotaur		Dan McCormack	Dan McCormack	Park City at Midnight	
Our Gay Brothers		Greta Snider		Short	
The Perfect Woman		Illeana Douglas		Short	
Pleasant Hill, USA		Joshua Wintringham			
Poor Little Rich Girl		Andy Warhol		Park City at Midnight	
Reality Bites		Ben Stiller	Helen Childress	Premieres	
Risk		Deirdre Fishel			
River of Grass		Kelly Reichardt	Kelly Reichardt	Dramatic Competition	
The Secret Life of Houses		Adrian Velicescu			
Sirens		John Duigan	John Duigan	Premieres	
Soapy Soapy Samba		Mark Yardas		Park City at Midnight	
Some Folks Call It a Slingblade		George Hickenlooper	Billy Bob Thornton		
Spanking the Monkey		David O. Russell	David O. Russell	Dramatic Competition	Audience Award: Dramatic
Suture		David Siegel, Scott McGehee			
Temptation of a Monk		Clara Law			
Totally F***ed Up		Gregg Araki	Gregg Araki	Premieres	
The Velvet Underground and Nico: A Symphony of Sound		Andy Warhol	John Sayles	Park City at Midnight	
What Happened Was...		Tom Noonan	Tom Noonan		Grand Jury Prize: Dramatic, Waldo Salt Screenwriting Award
What I Learned in America		Andy Hudson		Park City at Midnight	
You Only Live Once	La Vida Una Sola	Marianne Eyde			

== 1995 ==
Dates: January 19 – January 29

Film name (English)	Film name (Non-English)	Directed By	Written By	Category	Awards
The Addiction		Abel Ferrara	Nicholas St. John	Premieres	
Angela		Rebecca Miller	Rebecca Miller	Dramatic Competition	
A Pure Formality		Giuseppe Tornatore	Giuseppe Tornatore, Pascal Quignard	Premieres	
Avondale Dogs		Gregor Nicholas		Shorts	
Before Sunrise		Richard Linklater	Richard Linklater	Opening Night	
Before the Rain		Milcho Manchevski	Milcho Manchevski		
The Bill Nayer Chronicles		Cory McAbee		Park City at Midnight	
Black Is... Black Ain't		Marlon Riggs		Documentary	
The Brothers McMullen		Edward Burns	Edward Burns	Dramatic Competition	Grand Jury Prize: Dramatic (ex-aequo)
Complaints of a Dutiful Daughter		Deborah Hoffmann	Deborah Hoffmann	Shorts	
Crumb		Terry Zwigoff		Documentary	Grand Jury Prize: Documentary
Delirium		Mindy Faber			
The Doom Generation		Gregg Araki	Gregg Araki	Premieres	
Double Happiness		Mina Shum	Mina Shum	Premieres	
Double Strength		Barbara Hammer			
Eclipse		Jeremy Podeswa	Jeremy Podeswa		
Exotica		Atom Egoyan	Atom Egoyan	Special Screenings	
The Four Corners of Nowhere		Stephen Chbosky	Stephen Chbosky	Dramatic Competition	
Garden		James Spione	James Spione	Shorts	
Heavy		James Mangold	James Mangold	Dramatic Competition	
The Incredibly True Adventure of Two Girls in Love		Maria Maggenti			
A Litany for Survival: The Life and Work of Audre Lorde		Michelle Parkerson, Ada Gay Griffin			
Living in Oblivion		Tom DiCillo	Tom DiCillo	Dramatic Competition	Waldo Salt Screenwriting Award
Miami Rhapsody		David Frankel	David Frankel	Celebration in Provo	
Mute Witness		Anthony Waller	Anthony Waller	Park City at Midnight	
Nadja		Michael Almereyda	Michael Almereyda	Dramatic Competition	
Naked Jane		Linda Kandel		Dramatic Competition	
New Jersey Drive		Nick Gomez	Nick Gomez	Dramatic Competition	
Nightwatch	Nattevagten	Ole Bornedal	Ole Bornedal	Park City at Midnight	
Parallel Sons		John G. Young		Dramatic Competition	
Party Girl		Daisy von Scherler Mayer	Daisy von Scherler Mayer, Harry Birckmayer	Dramatic Competition	
Picture Bride		Kayo Hatta	Kayo Hatta, Mari Hatta		Audience Award: Dramatic
Plan 10 from Outer Space		Trent Harris	Trent Harris	Park City at Midnight	
Postcards from America		Steve McLean	Steve McLean	Dramatic Competition	
Priest		Antonia Bird	Jimmy McGovern	Premieres	
Safe		Todd Haynes	Todd Haynes	Premieres	
The Salesman and Other Adventures		Hannah Weyer		Short	
The Secret of Roan Inish		John Sayles	John Sayles	Magic, Myth, and Fable	
Shallow Grave		Danny Boyle	John Hodge	Premieres	
The Silences of the Palace		Moufida Tlatli			
Six Days, Six Nights	À la folie	Diane Kurys			
Son of the Shark		Agnes Merlet			
Super 8 1/2		Bruce LaBruce	Bruce LaBruce	Park City at Midnight	
Trevor		Peggy Rajski	Peggy Rajski, Randy Stone		
Unzipped		Douglas Keeve		Documentary Competition	Audience Award: Documentary
The Usual Suspects		Bryan Singer	Christopher McQuarrie	Premieres	
Wigstock: The Movie					
Words of Our Ancients		Paige Martinez			
Words Upon the Window Pane		Mary McGuckian			
The Young Poisoner's Handbook		Benjamin Ross	Jeff Rawle, Benjamin Ross		Grand Jury Prize: Dramatic (ex-aequo)

== 1996 ==
Dates: January 18 – January 28

Film name (English)	Film name (Non-English)	Directed By	Written By	Category	Awards
301 302		Chul-Soo Park		World Cinema	
A Leap of Faith		Jenifer McShane and Tricia Regan		Documentary Competition	
American Job		Chris Smith	Doug Ruschaupt	American Spectrum	
A Midwinter's Tale		Kenneth Branagh	Kenneth Branagh	Premieres	Opening Night
Angel Baby		Michael Rymer	Michael Rymer	World Cinema	
Angels and Insects		Philip Haas	Belinda Haas and Philip Haas	Premieres	
Arresting Gena		Hannah Weyer	Hannah Weyer		
A Star Is Born		William A. Wellman		William Wellman: American Storyteller	
Bandwagon		John Schultz		Dramatic Competition	
The Battle Over Citizen Kane		Michael Epstein, Thomas Lennon	Richard Ben Kramer and Thomas Lennon	Documentary Competition	
Believe Me		Angela Pope		World Cinema	
Belly Talkers		Sandra Luckow		Documentary Competition	
Big Night		Stanley Tucci, Campbell Scott	Stanley Tucci, Joseph Trocciano	Dramatic Competition	Waldo Salt Screenwriting Award
Blixa Bargeld Stole My Cowboy Shoes		Leslie MacCleave		Shorts	
The Bloody Child		Nina Menkes		Frontier	
Bound		The Wachowskis	The Wachowskis	Premieres	
Breathing Lessons				Shorts	
Brooms		Luke Cresswell and Steve McNicholas		Shorts	
Buckminster Fuller: Thinking Out Loud		Karen Goodman and Kirk Simon		Documentary Competition	
Care of the Spitfire Grill	The Spitfire Grill	Lee David Zlotoff	Lee David Zlotoff	Dramatic Competition	Audience Award: Dramatic
Carried Away		Bruno Barreto		Premieres	
Caught		Robert M. Young	Edward Pomerantz	Premieres	
Celestial Clockwork	Mecaniques Celestes	Fina Torres		World Cinema	
The Celluloid Closet		Rob Epstein and Jeffrey Friedman	Sharon Woo, Armistad Maupin, Rob Epstein, and Jeffrey Friedman	Documentary Competition	Freedom of Expression Award
Cold Fever				Premieres	
Color of a Brisk and Leaping Day		Christopher Münch	Christopher Münch	Dramatic Competition	
Cutting Loose		Susan Todd and Andrew Young		Documentary Competition	
Dadetown				American Spectrum	
The Darien Gap		Brad Anderson	Brad Anderson	Dramatic Competition	
Depth Solitude				Shorts	
Don't Die Without Telling Me Where You're Going	No te mueras sin decirme adónde vas	Eliseo Subiela	Eliseo Subiela		
The Dresden		Sherri Breyer		Shorts	
Drunks				American Spectrum	
Eden		Howard Goldberg	Howard Goldberg	Dramatic Competition	
Ed's Next Move		John C. Walsh	John C. Walsh	American Spectrum	
Egg Salad		Billy Kent		Shorts	
Everything Relative		Sharon Pollock	Sharon Pollock	American Spectrum	
Female Perversions		Susan Streitfeld	Susan Streitfeld, Julie Hebert	Dramatic Competition	
Fire on the Mountain		Beth Gage and George Gage	Beth Gage	Documentary Competition	
Flirt		Hal Hartley	Hal Hartley		Opening Night
Follow Me Home		Peter Bratt	Peter Bratt	Dramatic Competition	
Foreign Land		Walter Salles, Daniela Thomas		World Cinema	
Franchesca Page		Kelley Sane			
Freeway		Matthew Bright	Matthew Bright	Dramatic Competition	
Frisk				American Spectrum	
Girls Town		Jim McKay		Dramatic Competition	
Go Now		Michael Winterbottom	Jimmy McGovern, Paul Powell	World Cinema	
God's Lonely Man				Dramatic Competition	
Grandfather and Other Stories		Juan Carlos Rulfo		Shorts	
The Grave		Jonas Pate	Jonas Pate, Josh Pate	Park City at Midnight	
Guantanamera				Premieres	
Halving the Bones		Ruth Ozeki		Documentary Competition	
The High and the Mighty				William Wellman: American Storyteller	
House		Laurie Lynd		World Cinema	
Hustler White		Rick Castro, Bruce LaBruce	Rick Castro, Bruce LaBruce	Park City at Midnight	
Hype!		Doug		Documentary Competition	
I Shot Andy Warhol		Mary Harron	Mary Harron, Daniel Minahan	Dramatic Competition	
If Lucy Fell		Eric Schaeffer	Eric Schaeffer	Premieres	
It's My Party		Randal Kleiser	Randal Kleiser	Premieres	
Jane: An Abortion Service		Kate Kirtz and Nell Lundy		Documentary Competition	
Jenipapo		Monique Gardenberg			
Joe & Joe		David Wall	David Wall	American Spectrum	
Johns		Scott Silver		American Spectrum	
The Keeper		Joe Brewster	Joe Brewster	Dramatic Competition	
The Last Supper		Stacy Title	Dan Rosen	American Spectrum	
Late Bloomers		Julia Dyer and Gretchen Dyer	Gretchen Dyer	Dramatic Competition	
Loaded		Anna Campion		World Cinema	
Looking for Richard		Al Pacino		Premieres	
Losing Chase		Kevin Bacon	Anne Meredith	Premieres	
Love Serenade		Shirley Barrett		Premieres	
Madagascar					
Manny & Lo		Lisa Krueger	Lisa King	American Spectrum	
Meet Ruth Stoops	Citizen Ruth	Alexander Payne	Alexander Payne, Jim Taylor	Dramatic Competition	
Miguel		Walter Kehr		Shorts	
My Father's Garden		Miranda Smith		American Spectrum	
My Knees Were Jumping: Remembering the Kindertransports		Melissa Hacker		Documentary Competition	
Nobody Will Speak of Us When We're Dead		Agustín Díaz Yanes			
Normal Life		John McNaughton	Bob Schneider, Peg Haller	Premieres	
Notes from the Underground		Gary Walkow	Gary Walkow	Premieres	
Nothing Sacred				William Wellman: American Storyteller	
Nothing to Lose		Eric Bross		American Spectrum	
One of Those Days		Mark Decena		Shorts	
The Ox-Bow Incident				William Wellman: American Storyteller	
Palookaville		Alan Taylor	David Epstein	Premieres	
Paradise Lost: The Child Murders at Robin Hood Hills		Joe Berlinger, Bruce Sinofsky		Documentary Competition	
Personal Belongings		Steven Bognar		American Spectrum	
Pie in the Sky		Bryan Gordon		American Spectrum	
Pig!				Shorts	
Rave On		Steven Dupler		Shorts	
Rumble in the Bronx		Stanley Tong		Park City at Midnight	
Ruth Orkin: Frames of Life		Mary Engel		Shorts	
Scorpion Spring		Brian Cox		American Spectrum	
Shine		Scott Hicks	Jan Sardi	Premieres	
The Slap		Tamara Hernandez		Shorts	
The Spartans		David Portlock		Shorts	
Staccato Purr of the Exhaust		L.M. Meza	L.M. Meza	American Spectrum	
Stonewall		Nigel Finch	Rikki Beadle-Blair	World Cinema	
Strays		Vin Diesel			
Struggles in Steel				American Spectrum	
Surprise!		Viet Helmer		Shorts	
Swinger		Gregor Jordan		Shorts	
Sydney	Hard Eight	Paul Thomas Anderson	Paul Thomas Anderson	American Spectrum	
Synthetic Pleasures		Iara Lee		Documentary Competition	
Ten Benny		Eric Bross			
Tender Fictions		Barbara		Documentary Competition	
Their Own Vietnam		Nancy D. Kates		Shorts	
Timeless		Chris Hart	Chris Hart	American Spectrum	
Tokyo Fist		Shinya Tsukamoto	Shinya Tsukamoto	Park City at Midnight	
Trailer Camp		Jenni Olson		Park City at Midnight	
Troublesome Creek: A Midwestern		Jeanne Jordan and Steven Ascher		Documentary Competition	
Undertaker		Rachel Libert and Barbara Parker		Shorts	
Walking and Talking		Nicole Holofcener	Nicole Holofcener	Dramatic Competition	
War Stories		Gaylene Preston			
Watching Her Sleep		Barbara Rose Michaels		Shorts	
Welcome to the Dollhouse		Todd Solondz	Todd Solondz	Dramatic Competition	Grand Jury Prize: Dramatic
Westward the Women				William Wellman: American Storyteller	
When We Were Kings		Leon Gast		Documentary Competition	
White Autumn Crysanthemum		Patrick Ruane		Shorts	
The Whole Wide World		Dan Ireland	Michael Scott Myers	Dramatic Competition	
Wild Bill: Hollywood Maverick		Todd Robinson	Todd Robinson	William Wellman: American Storyteller	
Wild Boys of the Road		William A. Wellman		William Wellman: American Storyteller	
Wild Horses					
Wings		William A. Wellman		William Wellman: American Storyteller	
Without Air		Neil Abramson		American Spectrum	
The Word		Mark Pellington		Shorts	
Yellow Sky		William A. Wellman		William Wellman: American Storyteller	
Your Name in Cellulite		Gail Noonan		Shorts	
Zimbabwe Wheel		Samuel Ball		Shorts	

== 1997 ==
Dates: January 16 – January 26

Film name (English)	Film name (Non-English)	Directed By	Written By	Category	Awards and Notes
35 Miles from Normal		Mark Schwahn	Mark Schwahn	American Spectrum	
100 Proof		Jeremy Horton	Jeremy Horton	American Spectrum	
A Healthy Baby Girl		Judith Helfand		Documentary Competition	
All of Them Witches	Sobrenatural	Daniel Gruener		World Cinema	
All Over Me		Alex Sichel	Sylvia Sichel	Dramatic Competition	
Allen Ginsberg's "Ballad of the Skeletons"		Gus Van Sant		Short	
An Act of Conscience		Robbie Leppzer		Documentary Competition	
The Apartment	L'Appartement	Gilles Mimouni	Gilles Mimouni	Premieres	
Aristotle's Plot	Le Complot d'Aristotle	Jean-Pierre Bekolo		World Cinema	
Arresting Gena		Hannah Weyer	Hannah Weyer	Dramatic Competition	
A True Story		Abolfazl Jalili		World Cinema	
Black & White & Red All Over		DeMane Davis, Harry McCoy, Khari Streeter		Dramatic Competition	
Black Circle Boys		Matthew Carnahan	Matthew Carnahan	American Spectrum	
Blackrock		Steven Vidler	Nick Enright	Premieres	
Blacks and Jews		Alan Snitow, Deborah Kaufman		American Spectrum	
Box of Moonlight		Tom DiCillo	Tom DiCillo	Premieres	
Brassed Off		Mark Herman	Mark Herman	Opening Night in Salt Lake City	
Bremen Freedom	Bremen Freiheit	Rainer Werner Fassbinder		Retrospective	
Buddha Bless America				World Cinema	
Chasing Amy		Kevin Smith	Kevin Smith	Premieres	
Children of the Revolution		Peter Duncan		World Cinema	
Chronicle of a Disappearance		Elia Suleiman		Frontier	
Clockwatchers		Jill Sprecher	Jill Sprecher, Karen Sprecher	Dramatic Competition	
Colin Fitz		Robert Bella	Tom Morrissey	Dramatic Competition	
Deep Crimson		Arturo Ripstein		Premieres	
The Delta		Ira Sachs	Ira Sachs	Dramatic Competition	
Divinity Gratis				Frontier	
Dream with the Fishes		Finn Taylor		American Spectrum	
East Side Story		Dana Ranga		World Cinema	
Eye of God		Tim Blake Nelson		Dramatic Competition	
Family Name		Macky Alston		Documentary Competition	
Farewell My Darling		Park Chul-soo		World Cinema	
Fast, Cheap, and Out of Control		Erroll Morris		Premieres	
Fear and Learning at Hoover Elementary		Laura Angelica Simon		Documentary Competition	
Finished				Frontier	
Fistful of Flies		Monica Pellizzari		World Cinema	
Focus		Isaka Satoshi		World Cinema	
Franchesca Page		Kelley Sane		Park City at Midnight	
The Full Monty		Peter Cattaneo	Simon Beaufoy	World Cinema	
Gallivant				Frontier	
George B.		Eric Lea	Eric Lea	Dramatic Competition	
Girls Like Us		Jane Wagner, Tina DiFeliciantonio		Documentary Competition	
Going All the Way		Mark Pellington		Dramatic Competition	
Green Chimneys		Constance Marks		American Spectrum	
Gridlock'd		Vondie Curtis-Hall	Vondie Curtis-Hall	Premieres	
Happy Hour		Tommy O'Haver		Park City at Midnight	
Hide and Seek		Su Friedrich		Documentary Competition	
His & Hers		Hal Salwen	Hal Salwen	American Spectrum	
House of America		Mark Evans		World Cinema	
The House of Yes		Mark Waters	Mark Waters	Dramatic Competition	
Hugo Pool		Robert Downey Sr.		Premieres	
Hurricane	Hurricane Streets	Morgan J. Freeman	Morgan J. Freeman	Dramatic Competition	Audience Award: Dramatic (ex-aequo), Directing Award: Dramatic, Best Cinematography
Ilona Arrives in the Rain		Sergio Cabrera	Sergio Cabrera	World Cinema	
I Love You, Don't Touch Me!		Julie Davis		American Spectrum	
In the Company of Men		Neil LaBute	Neil LaBute	Dramatic Competition	
Joe's So Mean to Josephine		Peter Wellington	Peter Wellington	World Cinema	
Killers		Mike Mendez	Mike Mendez, Dave Larsen	Park City at Midnight	
Kissed		Lynne Stopkewich		World Cinema	
Kiss Me, Guido		Tony Vitale	Tony Vitale	American Spectrum	
Kolya				World Cinema	
Landscapes of Memory				World Cinema	
The Last Time I Committed Suicide		Stephen Kay		American Spectrum	
Licensed to Kill		Arthur Dong		Documentary Competition	
Lilies		John Greyson		World Cinema	
Little Angel		Helke Misselwitz		World Cinema	
The Long Way Home		Mark Jonathan Harris		Documentary Competition	
Lost Highway		David Lynch	David Lynch, Barry Gifford	Premieres	
Love and Other Catastrophes		Emma-Kate Croghan		World Cinema	
Love God		Frank Grow	Frank Grow	Park City at Midnight	
Love Jones		Theodore Witcher	Theodore Witcher	Dramatic Competition	Audience Award: Dramatic (ex-aequo)
Love Serenade		Shirley Barrett		Premieres	
Love! Valour! Compassion!		Joe Mantello		Premieres	
Love Walked In		Juan José Campanella		Premieres	
Making Sandwiches		Sandra Bullock		Shorts	
Mary Jane's Not a Virgin Anymore		Sarah Jacobson	Sarah Jacobson	American Spectrum	
Mimi		Lucile Hadzihalilovic		World Cinema	
Moebius				Frontier	
Mr. Vincent		Robert Celestino		American Spectrum	
My America, or Honk If You Love Jesus		Renee Tajima-Pena		Documentary Competition	
The Myth of Fingerprints		Bart Freundlich	Bart Freundlich	Dramatic Competition	
New School Order		Geni Reticker		Documentary Competition	
Norma's Lament		Christina Booth		Shorts	
Not Love, Just Frenzy	Más que amor, frenesí			Park City at Midnight	
Nowhere		Gregg Araki	Gregg Araki	Premieres	
Oedipus Mayor		Jorge Ali Traina		World Cinema	
Out at Work		Tami Gold and Kelly Anderson		American Spectrum	
Pink Flamingos		John Waters	John Waters	Park City at Midnight	
Portland		Greta Snider		Short	
Power		Magnus Isacsson		World Cinema	
Poverty Outlaw		Pamela Yates, Peter Kinoy		Documentary Competition	
Prefontaine		Steve James		Premieres	Opening Night
Prisoner of the Mountains		Sergei Bodrov		World Cinema	
Puddle Cruiser		Jay Chandrasekhar	Broken Lizard	American Spectrum	
The Rainbow Man/John 3:16		Sam Green		American Spectrum	
Rhinoceros Hunting in Budapest				World Cinema	
Riding the Rails		Michael Uys, Lexy Lovell		Documentary Competition	
Running Against		Antonio Tibaldi		World Cinema	
Santa Fe		Andrew Shea	Mark Medoff, Andrew Shea	Dramatic Competition	
Seed		Karin Thayer		Short	
Shall We Dance?		Masayuki Suo	Masayuki Suo	World Cinema	
Shooting the Breeze		Christina Andreef		Short	
Six O'Clock News		Ross McElwee		American Spectrum	
Slaves to the Underground		Kristine Peterson	Bill Cody	Dramatic Competition	
Snakes and Ladders		Trish McAdam	Trish McAdam	World Cinema	
Space Truckers		Stuart Gordon	Ted Mann	Park City at Midnight	
Star Maps		Miguel Arteta	Miguel Arteta	American Spectrum	
Stella Does Tricks		Coky Giedroyc		World Cinema	
Strays		Vin Diesel		Dramatic Competition	
SubUrbia		Richard Linklater	Eric Bogosian	Premieres	Opening Night
Sunday		Jonathan Nossiter		Dramatic Competition	Grand Jury Prize: Dramatic, Waldo Salt Screenwriting Award
Sweet Power		Lúcia Murat		World Cinema	
Temptress Moon		Chen Kaige		World Cinema	
This World, Then the Fireworks		Michael Oblowitz	Larry Gross	American Spectrum	
The Twilight of the Golds				American Spectrum	
Twin Town		Kevin Allen	Paul Durden, Kevin Allen	World Cinema	
Two People Talking		Isshin Inudo		World Cinema	
Ulee's Gold		Victor Nuñez	Victor Nuñez	Premieres	
Waco: The Rules of Engagement		William Gazecki		American Spectrum	
When the Cat's Away		Cédric Klapisch		World Cinema	
Wonderland		John O'Hagan		American Spectrum	

== 1998 ==
Dates: January 15 – January 25

Film name (English)	Film name (Non-English)	Directed By	Written By	Category	Awards
28		Greg Sax		Frontier	
2by4		Jimmy Smallhorne	Terry McGoff, Jimmy Smallhorne, Fergus Tighe	Dramatic Competition	Excellence in Cinematography Award: Dramatic
A, B, C... Manhattan		Amir Naderi	Maryam Dalan, Ben Edlund, Jessica Gohlke, Tracy McMillan, Amir Naderi	American Spectrum	
About Laughter		Lana Bernberg, Andrew Linsk		American Spectrum	
The Absolution of Anthony		Dean Slotar		Shorts	
Advice to Adventurous Girls		Kim Wood		Documentary Competition	
Affliction		Paul Schrader	Paul Schrader	Premieres	
Amarillo by Morning		Spike Jonze		Shorts	
Amy		Susan Rivo		Shorts	
Angel Passing		David Langlitz		Shorts	
Animals		Michael Di Jiacomo	Michael Di Jiacomo	American Spectrum	
Arrow Shot		Mike Dolan		Shorts	
Baby, It's You		Anne Makepeace	Anne Makepeace	Documentary Competition	
Backbone of the World		George Burdeau		Native Cinema	
Balloons, Streamers		Josh Sternfeld		Shorts	
Battle of the Sexes		Eric Kripke		Shorts	
Beautopia		Katharina Otto-Bernstein	Katharina Otto-Bernstein	Documentary Competition	
The Big Lebowski		Joel Coen, Ethan Coen	Ethan Coen, Joel Coen	Special Screenings	
The Big One		Michael Moore	Michael Moore	Premieres	
Billy's Hollywood Screen Kiss		Tommy O'Haver	Tommy O'Haver	Dramatic Competition	
Bleach		Bill Platt	Bill Platt, A.J. Pierce	Shorts	
Blind Faith		Ernest Dickerson	Frank Military	Premieres	
Blood, Guts, Bullets and Octane		Joe Carnahan	Joe Carnahan	Park City at Midnight	
Bocage, the Triumph of Love		Djalma Limongi Batista	Gualter Limongi Batista, Djalma Limongi Batista	World Cinema	
Bonnie Looksaway's Iron Art Wagon		Wes Studi	Bruce King	Native Cinema	
Boy		Glenn Fraser		Shorts	
Breeze		Barbara Sanon		Documentary Competition	
Bringing It All Back Home		Chris Eyre		Native Cinema	
The Broken Jaw		Chris Shepherd		Shorts	
A Brother		Sylvie Verheyde	Sylvie Verheyde	World Cinema	
Brother Tied		Derek Cianfrance	Derek Cianfrance, Joey Curtis, Mike Tillman	American Spectrum	
Buffalo '66		Vincent Gallo	Alison Bagnall, Vincent Gallo	Dramatic Competition	
Bwisk		Corky Quakenbush		Shorts	
The Bystander from Hell		Matthew Harrison		Shorts	
Carved from the Heart		Ellen Frankenstein		Native Cinema	
The Castle		Rob Sitch	Santo Cilauro, Tom Gleisner, Jane Kennedy, Rob Sitch	World Cinema	
Catholic School		Jona Frank		Shorts	
Central Station		Walter Salles	Marcos Bernstein, Joao Emanuel Carneiro	Premieres	
Chile, Obstinate Memory	Chile, la memoria obstinada	Patricio Guzmán		World Cinema	
A Chrysanthemum Burst in Cincoesquinas		Daniel Burman	Daniel Burman	Frontier	
Clops		Corky Quakenbush		Shorts	
Conceiving Ada		Lynn Hershman Leeson	Eileen Jones, Lynn Hershman Leeson	American Spectrum	
The Connection		Shirley Clarke	Shirley Clarke	Sundance Collection	
Cosmo's Tale		Adam Shankman		Shorts	
Cuba 15		Elizabeth Schub Browde		Documentary Competition	
Cube		Vincenzo Natali	Andre Bijelic, Graeme Manson, Vincenzo Natali	Park City at Midnight	
Dead Man's Curve	The Curve	Dan Rosen	Dan Rosen	American Spectrum	
The Decline of Western Civilization Part III		Penelope Spheeris		Documentary Competition	Freedom of Expression Award
Digging to China		Timothy Hutton	Karen Janszen	Premieres	
Dirty		Bruce Sweeney		World Cinema	
Divine Trash		Steve Yeager	Kevin Heffernan, Steve Yeager	Documentary Competition	Filmmaker Trophy Documentary
Don't Run, Johnny		Tom E. Brown		Shorts	
Eleven Eighty Two		Kevin Everson		Documentary Competition	
Elvis Dead at 58		Giorgio Bonecchi Borgazzi		Park City at Midnight	
English Only		Juan Uribe		Shorts	
The Farm		Liz Garbus, Jonathan Stack		Documentary Competition	Grand Jury Prize: Documentary
Fireworks	Hana-bi	Takeshi Kitano	Takeshi Kitano	World Cinema	
First Love, Last Rites		Jesse Peretz	David Ryan	American Spectrum	
Frank Lloyd Wright		Ken Burns, Lynn Novick	Geoffrey C. Ward	Documentary Competition	
Frat House		Todd Phillips, Andrew Gurland		Documentary Competition	Grand Jury Prize: Documentary
A Friend of the Deceased		Vyacheslav Krishtofovich	Andrei Kurkov	World Cinema	
Furious George		Corky Quakenbush		Shorts	
Gasman		Lynne Ramsay	Lynne Ramsay	Shorts	
The Gimmick		Peter Askin	Dael Orlandersmith	Sundance Theatre Program	
Girls' Night		Nick Hurran	Kay Mellor	World Cinema	
God Says So		Marjorie Kaye		American Spectrum	
Gods and Monsters		Bill Condon	Bill Condon	American Spectrum	
Goshogaoka		Sharon Lockhart	Sharon Lockhart	Frontier	
The Hanging Garden		Thom Fitzgerald	Thom Fitzgerald	World Cinema	
Hav Plenty		Christopher Scott Cherot	Christopher Scott Cherot	Dramatic Competition	
Have You Seen Patsy Wayne?		Todd Korgan		Shorts	
Hawaiian Sting		Peter D. Beyt	Anthony Kahawaii	Native Cinema	
Here We Go Again		Jason Richard Robinson		Shorts	
High Art		Lisa Cholodenko	Lisa Cholodenko	Dramatic Competition	Waldo Salt Screenwriting Award
A Hollow Place		Joseph Anaya		Shorts	
How to Make the Cruelest Month		Kip Koenig	Kip Koenig	Dramatic Competition	
Human Remains		Jay Rosenblatt		Shorts	
I Married a Strange Person!		Bill Plympton	Bill Plympton, P. C. Vey	Dramatic Competition	
I Remember		David Chartier, Avi Zev Weider		Shorts	
I Went Down		Paddy Breathnach	Conor McPherson	World Cinema	
Inbound Mercy		David Nesenoff, Glenn R. Schuster		American Spectrum	
Inside/Out		Rob Tregenza	Rob Tregenza	Frontier	
Jerry and Tom		Saul Rubinek	Rick Cleveland	Dramatic Competition	
Junk Mail		Pal Sletaune	Jonny Halberg, Pal Sletaune	World Cinema	
Just One Time		Lane Janger		Shorts	
Keep in a Dry Place and Away from Children		Martin Davies		Shorts	
Kurt and Courtney		Nick Broomfield		World Cinema	
La Lecon		Craig Marsden		Shorts	
The Land Girls		David Leland	David Leland	Premieres	
The Last Supper		Jeremy Boxer		Shorts	
Lawn Dogs		John Duigan	Naomi Wallace	World Cinema	
A Letter without Words		Lisa Lewenz	Lisa Lewenz	Documentary Competition	
Life According to Muriel	La vida según Muriel	Eduardo Milewicz	Eduardo Milewicz, Susana Silvestre	World Cinema	
Life During WarTime		Evan Dunsky	Evan Dunsky	American Spectrum	
Lou Reed: Rock and Roll Heart		Timothy Greenfield-Sanders		Documentary Competition	
Majorettes in Space		David Fourier		Shorts	
Marie Baie des Anges		Manuel Pradal	Manuel Pradal	World Cinema	
Martín (Hache)		Adolfo Aristarain	Adolfo Aristarain, Kathy Saavedra	World Cinema	
Melvin Van Peebles' Classified X		Mark Daniels	Melvin Van Peebles	American Spectrum	
Melvyn Schmatzman, Freudian Dentist		David Grotell		Shorts	
Miss Monday		Benson Lee	Benson Lee, Paul Leyden, Richard Morel	Dramatic Competition	
The Misadventures of Margaret		Brian Skeet	Brian Skeet	Premieres	
Modulations		Iara Lee		Documentary Competition	
Moment of Impact		Julia Loktev	Julia Loktev	Documentary Competition	
Montana		Jennifer Leitzes	Erich Hoeber, Jon Hoeber	Premieres	
Monte Hellman: American Auteur		George Hickenlooper		Shorts	
More to Life		Paul Morgan		Shorts	
Motel Cactus		Park Ki-Yong	Bong Joon-Ho, Park Ki-Yong	World Cinema	
Mr. P's Dancing Sushi Bar		Hirotaka Tashiro	Hirotaka Tashiro, Tomoko Tashiro	Special Events	
Mystery School		Doug Hughes	Paul Selig	Sundance Theatre Program	
Naturally Native		Jennifer Wynne Farmer, Valerie Red-Horse	Valerie Red-Horse	Native Cinema	
Next Stop Wonderland		Brad Anderson	Brad Anderson, Lyn Vaus	Dramatic Competition	
Niagara, Niagara		Bob Gosse	Matthew Weiss	American Spectrum	
Obsession		Peter Sehr	Marie Noelle, Peter Sehr	World Cinema	
Omar, the Short		Jarl Olsen		Shorts	
Once We Were Strangers		Emanuele Crialese	Emanuele Crialese	Dramatic Competition	
One		Tony Barbieri	Tony Barbieri	American Spectrum	
Oops		Mike Miller		American Spectrum	
Open Your Eyes	Abre los Ojos	Alejandro Amenábar	Alejandro Amenábar, Mateo Gil	World Cinema	
Operation		Jason Reitman		Shorts	
The Opposite of Sex		Don Roos	Don Roos	Premieres	
Orgazmo		Trey Parker	Trey Parker	Park City at Midnight	
Out of the Past		Jeff Dupre	Michelle Ferrari	Documentary Competition	
Party Monster		Fenton Bailey, Randy Barbato		American Spectrum	
Paulina		Vicky Funari	Vicky Funari, Jennifer Maytorena Taylor, Paulina Cruz Suárez	Documentary Competition	
Persona Non Grata		Sara Gilbert		Shorts	
Pete's Garden		Greg Germann		Shorts	
Phil Touches Flo		David Birdsell		Shorts	
Pi		Darren Aronofsky	Darren Aronofsky	Dramatic Competition	Directing Award: Dramatic
The Pigeon Egg Strategy		Max Makowski	Max Makowski	Frontier	
Polish Wedding		Theresa Connelly	Theresa Connelly	Premieres	
Postman Blues		Sabu	Sabu	World Cinema	
A Price Above Rubies		Boaz Yakin	Boaz Yakin	Premieres	
Qatuwas: People Gathering Together		Barb Cranmer		Native Cinema	
Raw Images from the Optic Cross		Karl Nussbaum		Shorts	
The Real Blonde		Tom DiCillo	Tom DiCillo	Premieres	Opening Night
Reinfather		Corky Quakenbush		Shorts	
Relax...It's Just Sex		P. J. Castellaneta	P. J. Castellaneta	American Spectrum	
River Red		Eric Drilling	Eric Drilling	American Spectrum	
The Rocking Horse Winner		Michael Almereyda		Shorts	
Rosa's Time		Daniel Hawkes	Thom Ernst	Native Cinema	
Safe Men		John Hamburg	John Hamburg	Park City at Midnight	
The Saltmen of Tibet		Ulrike Koch	Ulrike Koch	World Cinema	
Scars		James Herbert		Frontier	
The Sea Change		Michael Bray	Michael Bray, Billy Hurman	Premieres	
Sea Space		William Farley		Shorts	
Silent Tears		Shirley Cheechoo		Native Cinema	
Sin Querer		Ciro Cappellari	Osvaldo Bayer, Ciro Cappellari, Graciela Maglie	Special Events	
Slam		Marc Levin	Marc Levin, Sonja Sohn, Richard Stratton, Saul Williams	Dramatic Competition	Grand Jury Prize: Dramatic
Slavegirls		Ellen Bruno	Ellen Bruno	Documentary Competition	
Sleeping Beauties		Jamie Babbit		Shorts	
Sliding Doors		Peter Howitt	Peter Howitt	Premieres	Opening Night
Smoke Signals		Chris Eyre	Sherman Alexie	Dramatic Competition	Audience Award: Dramatic, Filmmaker Trophy Dramatic
Snake Feed		Debra Granik		Shorts	
Snip		Craig Sullivan		Shorts	
Monument Ave.	Monument Ave.	Ted Demme	Mike Armstrong	Premieres	
Some Nudity Required		Odette Springer	Johanna Demetrakas, Odette Springer	Documentary Competition	
Songbird		Oh Kyoung Hee		Shorts	
Sounds of Faith		Malinda Maynor		Native Cinema	
The Spanish Prisoner		David Mamet	David Mamet	Premieres	
Spark		Garret Williams	Garret Williams	American Spectrum	
The Spitball Story		Jean Bach		American Spectrum	
Spudwrench—Kahnawake Man		Alanis Obomsawin	Alanis Obomsawin	World Cinema	
Stage Fright		Steve Box		Shorts	
Still Revolutionaries		Sienna McLean		Shorts	
Switch Your Ride		Corky Quakenbush		Shorts	
Tea		Barney Cokeliss		Shorts	
That Strange Person		Eileen O'Meara		Shorts	
Titsiana Booberini		Robert Luketic		Shorts	
Tomorrow Night		Louis C.K.	Louis C.K.	Park City at Midnight	
Too Tired to Die		Wonsuk Chin	Wonsuk Chin	American Spectrum	
Totem Talk		Annie Frazier Henry		Native Cinema	
Tushka		Ian Skorodin	Ian Skorodin	Native Cinema	
TwentyFourSeven		Shane Meadows	Paul Fraser, Shane Meadows	World Cinema	
Under Heaven		Meg Richman	Meg Richman	Dramatic Competition	
Under the Skin		Carine Adler	Carine Adler	World Cinema	
Unexpected Guest		Adam Druxman		Shorts	
Up on the Roof		Jacqueline Turnure		Shorts	
Venceremos!		Giovanni Ghidini-Pappalottera		Shorts	
The Waiting Children		Ethan Silverman		Shorts	
We All Fall Down	Tuti giù per terra	Davide Ferrario	Davide Ferrario	World Cinema	
The Well		Samantha Lang	Laura Jones	World Cinema	
Whacked!		Rolf Gibbs		Shorts	
Whatever		Susan Skoog	Susan Skoog	American Spectrum	
What’s the Deal		Robert Mac		Shorts	
When the Fire Dims		Dan Golding		Native Cinema	
Who the Hell Is Juliette?	¿Quien diablos es Juliette?	Carlos Marcovich	Carlos Cuarón	World Cinema	
Wicked		Michael Steinberg	Eric Weiss	American Spectrum	
Wild Man Blues		Barbara Kopple		Documentary Competition	
The Wonderful Ice Cream Suit		Stuart Gordon	Ray Bradbury	Special Screenings	
Wrestling With Alligators		Laurie Weltz	Scott Kraft, Laurie Weltz	Dramatic Competition	
Yellow Wooden Ring		Barrett Tripp		Native Cinema	

== 1999 ==
Dates: January 21 – January 31

Film name (English)	Film name (Non-English)	Directed By	Written By	Category	Awards
2 Seconds		Manon Briand	Manon Briand	World Cinema	
The 24 Hour Woman		Nancy Savoca	Nancy Savoca, Richard Guay	Premieres	Opening Night
The Adopted Son	Beshkempir	Aktan Abdykalykov	Aktan Abdykalykov	World Cinema	
The Adventures of Sebastian Cole		Tod Williams	Tod Williams	Dramatic Competition	
Afraid of Everything		David Barker	David Barker	American Spectrum	
After Life		Hirokazu Kore-eda	Hirokazu Kore-eda	World Cinema	
American Movie		Chris Smith		Documentary Competition	Grand Jury Prize: Documentary
American Hollow		Rory Kennedy	Mark Bailey	Documentary Competition	
American Pimp		The Hughes Brothers		Documentary Competition	
An American Love Story		Jennifer Fox		Special Screenings	
The Autumn Heart		Steven Maler	Davidlee Wilson	Dramatic Competition	
A Walk on the Moon		Tony Goldwyn	Pamela Gray	Premieres	
Barrio				World Cinema	
Beefcake		Thom Fitzgerald	Thom Fitzgerald	World Cinema	
Big Bear		Gil Cardinal		Native Forum	
Black Cat, White Cat		Emir Kusturica	Gordan Mihić	World Cinema	
The Black Press: Soldiers without Swords		Stanley Nelson		Documentary Competition	
The Blair Witch Project		Daniel Myrick, Eduardo Sánchez	Daniel Myrick, Eduardo Sánchez	Park City at Midnight	
Brakhage		Jim Shedden		Frontier	
Cache		Carolyn Coal	Carolyn Coal	Shorts	
Chillecothe		Todd Edwards	Todd Edwards	American Spectrum	
The City	La ciudad	David Riker	David Riker	American Spectrum	
Cookie's Fortune		Robert Altman	Anne Rapp	Premieres	Opening Night
The Corndog Man		Andrew Shea	Andrew Shea	American Spectrum	
Dance of the Dust				World Cinema	
Death: A Love Story		Michelle LeBrun		Documentary Competition	
Dirt		Chel White		Shorts	
Dresden		Ben Speth		Frontier	
Drylongso		Cauleen Smith	Cauleen Smith, Salim Akil	American Spectrum	
Edge of Seventeen		David Moreton		American Spectrum	
Flying Saucer Rock'n'Roll		Enda Hughes		Shorts	
Fools Gold		Jeffrey Janger		American Spectrum	
Forever Fever		Glen Goei	Glen Goei	World Cinema	
Friendly Fire				World Cinema	
Genghis Blues		Roko Belic		American Spectrum	
Get Bruce		Andrew J. Kuehn		Park City at Midnight	
Get Real		Simon Shore		World Cinema	
Getting to Know You		Lisanne Skyler	Lisanne Skyler, Tristine Skyler	Dramatic Competition	
Go		Doug Liman	John August	Premieres	
Guinevere		Audrey Wells	Audrey Wells	Dramatic Competition	Waldo Salt Screenwriting Award (ex-aequo)
Happy, Texas		Mark Illsley	Mark Illsley	Dramatic Competition	
Heart of Light		Jacob Grønlykke		World Cinema	
Hideous Kinky		Gillies MacKinnon		Premieres	
The Hi-Line		Ron Judkins	Ron Judkins	Dramatic Competition	
Hitchcock, Selznick, and the End of Hollywood				Documentary Competition	
Home Page		Doug Block		Documentary Competition	
The Honour of All		Phil Lucas		Native Forum	
I Stand Alone	Seul contre tous	Gaspar Noé	Gaspar Noé	World Cinema	
The Item		Dan Clark		Dramatic Competition	
Jawbreaker		Darren Stein	Darren Stein	Premieres	
Joe the King		Frank Whaley		Dramatic Competition	Waldo Salt Screenwriting Award (ex-aequo)
Judy Berlin				Dramatic Competition	Directing Award: Dramatic
Kill the Man		Tom Booker		Park City at Midnight	
The Kindness of Strangers		Mano Chermayeff		Special Screenings	
Langmuir's World				American Spectrum	
The Last Guy to Let You Down				Shorts	
The Legacy: Murder & Media, Prisons & Politicians				Documentary Competition	
Life History of a Star		Jennifer M. Gentile		Shorts	
Life Is to Whistle				World Cinema	
Life on Earth		Abderrahmane Sissako		World Cinema	
Life Tastes Good		Philip Kan Gotanda		American Spectrum	
Little Thieves, Big Thieves				World Cinema	
The Living Museum				Documentary Competition	
Lock, Stock and Two Smoking Barrels		Guy Ritchie	Guy Ritchie	Premieres	
Los Enchiladas!		Mitch Hedberg		Park City at Midnight	
The Loss of Sexual Innocence		Mike Figgis	Mike Figgis	Premieres	
Louise (Take 2)		Sigfried		World Cinema	
Love Bites		Michael Horowitz, Colburn Tseng		Park City at Midnight	
The Lovers of the Arctic Circle	Los amantes del círculo polar	Julio Médem	Julio Médem	World Cinema	
Megacities		Michael Glawogger		World Cinema	
Mighty Peking Man		Ho Meng Hua		Park City at Midnight	
The Minus Man		Hampton Fancher		Dramatic Competition	
Mr. Death		Errol Morris		Premieres	
On the Ropes		Nanette Burstein		Documentary Competition	
The Outfitters		Reverge Anselmo		American Spectrum	
The Passion of Ayn Rand		Christopher Menual		Premieres	
Possums		Max Burnett		American Spectrum	
Praise		John Curran		World Cinema	
P. Tinto's Miracle		Javier Fesser		World Cinema	
Rabbit in the Moon		Emiko Omori		Documentary Competition	
Radiation		Suki Stetson Hawley, Michael Galinsky		American Spectrum	
Ravenous		Antonia Bird	Ted Griffin	Special Screenings	
Regret to Inform		Barbara Sonneborn		Documentary Competition	
Return with Honor		Freida Lee Mock, Terry Sanders		American Spectrum	
Roberta		Eric Mandelbaum		Dramatic Competition	
Run Lola Run	Lola rennt	Tom Tykwer	Tom Tykwer	World Cinema	Audience Award: World Cinema (ex-aequo)
Samurai Fiction		Hiroyuki Nakano		Park City at Midnight	
Santitos				Premieres	
Savor Me	Sabor a mí	Claudia Morgado Escanilla		Shorts	
Second Skin		Amy Talkington		Shorts	
Serial Lover		James Huth	Romain Berthomieu, James Huth	Park City at Midnight	
Sex: The Annabel Chong Story		Gough Lewis		Documentary Competition	
She Smokes		Christa Collins		Shorts	
Side Streets		Tony Gerber		American Spectrum	
Silence		Jack Darcus		Native Forum	
Silvia Prieto		Martín Rejtman		World Cinema	
Sing Faster: The Stagehands' Ring Cycle				Documentary Competition	
SLC Punk!		James Merendino	James Merendino	Premieres	Opening Night
A Slipping-Down Life		Toni Kalem	Toni Kalem	Dramatic Competition	
Southpaw				World Cinema	
Speaking in Strings				Documentary Competition	
Speedy Boys				Frontier	
Splendor		Gregg Araki	Gregg Araki	Premieres	
Star Trak		Roy T. Wood		Park City at Midnight	
Sugar Town		Kurt Voss, Allison Anders	Kurt Voss, Allison Anders	Premieres	
The Terrorist		Santosh Sivan		World Cinema	
Thick as Thieves		Scott Sanders	Scott Sanders, Arthur Krystal	Premieres	
Three Seasons	Ba Mùa	Tony Bui	Tony Bui, Timothy Linh Bui	Dramatic Competition	Grand Jury Prize: Dramatic, Audience Award: Dramatic
Train of Life		Radu Mihăileanu		World Cinema	Audience Award: World Cinema (ex-aequo)
Trans				Frontier	
Treasure Island		Scott King	Scott King	Dramatic Competition	
Tree Shade		Lisa Collins		Shorts	
Trick		Jim Fall		Dramatic Competition	
Tumbleweeds		Gavin O'Connor	Gavin O'Connor, Angela Shelton	Dramatic Competition	
Twin Falls Idaho		Michael Polish	Mark Polish, Michael Polish	American Spectrum	
Two Girls and a Baby		Kelli Simpson		Shorts	
Two Hands		Gregor Jordan		Premieres	
Two Seasons		Christine Swanson		Shorts	
Under a Spell				World Cinema	
Under California: The Limits of Time				World Cinema	
Valerie Flake		John Putch		American Spectrum	
Venus Blue				Shorts	
The War Zone		Tim Roth		Premieres	
When Love Comes		Garth Maxwell		World Cinema	
The Wounds		Srđan Dragojević		World Cinema	
Yusho-Renaissance				Frontier	

== 2000 ==
Dates: January 20 – January 30

Film name - English	Film name - Non-English	Directed By	Written By	Category	Awards
American Psycho		Mary Harron	Mary Harron, Guinevere Turner	Premieres	
Animal Factory		Steve Buscemi			
Backroads		Shirley Cheechoo	Shirley Cheechoo		
Beat		Gary Walkow	Gary Walkow	American Spectrum	
Boiler Room		Ben Younger	Ben Younger	Premieres	
The Broken Hearts Club		Greg Berlanti	Greg Berlanti	Premieres	
But I'm a Cheerleader		Jamie Babbit	Brian Wayne Peterson	Park City at Midnight	
The Charcoal People		Nigel Noble			
Chuck and Buck		Miguel Arteta	Mike White	Dramatic Competition	
Committed		Lisa Krueger	Lisa Krueger	Dramatic Competition	
Compensation		Zeinabu irene Davis	Marc Arthur Chéry	Dramatic Competition	
The Convent		Mike Mendez	Chaton Anderson	Park City at Midnight	
Crime and Punishment in Suburbia		Rob Schmidt	Larry Gross	Dramatic Competition	
Drop Back Ten		Stacy Cochran		Dramatic Competition	
Dropping Out		Mark Osborne	Kent Osborne	American Spectrum	
The Eyes of Tammy Faye		Fenton Bailey, Randy Barbato			
Girlfight		Karyn Kusama	Karyn Kusama	Dramatic Competition	Grand Jury Prize: Dramatic (ex-aequo), Directing Award: Dramatic
Groove		Greg Harrison	Greg Harrison		
Hamlet		Michael Almereyda	Michael Almereyda	Premieres	
Happy Accidents		Brad Anderson	Brad Anderson	Premieres	
Human Resources		Laurent Cantet	Laurent Cantet, Gilles Marchand	World Cinema	
Human Traffic		Justin Kerrigan	Justin Kerrigan	Park City at Midnight	
I.K.U.		Shu Lea Cheang	Shu Lea Cheang	Park City at Midnight	
Intern		Michael Lange			
Love & Basketball		Gina Prince-Bythewood	Gina Prince-Bythewood	Premieres	
My Generation		Barbara Kopple			
New Waterford Girl		Allen Moyle			
New Year's Day		Suri Krishnamma			
Nuyorican Dream					
Our Song		Jim McKay	Jim McKay		
Psycho Beach Party		Robert Lee King	Charles Busch	Park City at Midnight	
Panic		Henry Bromell	Henry Bromell		
Saving Grace		Nigel Cole	Mark Crowdy, Craig Ferguson	World Cinema	Audience Award: World Cinema
Shadow Magic		Ann Hu		American Spectrum	
Snow Days	Let It Snow	Adam Marcus	Kipp Marcus		
Soft Fruit		Christina Andreef	Christina Andreef	World Cinema	
Songcatcher		Maggie Greenwald	Maggie Greenwald	Dramatic Competition	
Spike and Mike's Sick and Twisted Animation				Park City at Midnight	
The Tao of Steve		Jenniphr Goodman		Dramatic Competition	
Things You Can Tell Just by Looking at Her		Rodrigo García	Rodrigo García	Premieres	
Two Family House		Raymond De Felitta	Raymond De Felitta	Dramatic Competition	Audience Award: Dramatic
Urbania		Jon Shear, Philippe Denham	Daniel Reitz, Jon Shear	Dramatic Competition	
The Virgin Suicides		Sofia Coppola	Sofia Coppola	Premieres	
Waking the Dead		Keith Gordon	Robert Dillon	Premieres	
What's Cooking?		Gurinder Chadha			
Wonderland		Michael Winterbottom	Laurence Coriat	World Cinema	
You Can Count on Me		Kenneth Lonergan	Kenneth Lonergan	Dramatic Competition	Grand Jury Prize: Dramatic (ex-aequo), Waldo Salt Screenwriting Award

== 2001 ==
Dates: January 18 – January 28

Film name - English	Film name - Non-English	Directed By	Written By	Category	Awards
30 Years to Life		Vanessa Middleton		Dramatic Competition	
Acts of Worship		Rosemary Rodriguez		American Spectrum	
At Midnight I'll Take Your Soul		José Mojica Marins	José Mojica Marins	Park City at Midnight	
Beautiful Creatures		Bill Eagles	Simon Donald	World Cinema	
The Believer		Henry Bean	Henry Bean	Dramatic Competition	Grand Jury Prize: Dramatic
The Business of Strangers		Patrick Stettner	Patrick Stettner	Dramatic Competition	
The Caveman's Valentine		Kasi Lemmons	George Dawes Green	Premieres	
Chopper		Andrew Dominik	Andrew Dominik	World Cinema	
Choreography for Copy Machine (Photocopy Cha Cha)		Chel White		Shorts	
Coffin Joe: The Strange World of José Mojica Marins				Park City at Midnight	
Compassionate Sex		Laura Mañá		World Cinema	
Dancing in September		Reggie Rock Bythewood	Reggie Rock Bythewood	American Spectrum	
The Deep End		Scott McGehee and David Siegel	Scott McGehee and David Siegel	Dramatic Competition	
Dogtown and Z-Boys		Stacy Peralta		Documentary Competition	Audience Award: Documentary
Donnie Darko		Richard Kelly	Richard Kelly	Dramatic Competition	
Double Whammy		Tom DiCillo	Tom DiCillo	Premieres	
Enigma		Michael Apted	Tom Stoppard	Premieres	
Haiku Tunnel		Jacob Kornbluth, Josh Kornbluth	Jacob Kornbluth, Josh Kornbluth	American Spectrum	
Hedwig and the Angry Inch		John Cameron Mitchell	John Cameron Mitchell	Dramatic Competition	Audience Award: Dramatic, Directing Award: Dramatic
Hey, Happy!		Noam Gonick	Noam Gonick	Park City at Midnight	
In the Bedroom		Todd Field	Todd Field, Robert Pestinger	Dramatic Competition	Special Jury Prize
Intimacy	Intimité	Patrice Chéreau	Patrice Chéreau, Anne-Louise Trividic	Premieres	
The Invisible Circus		Adam Brooks	Adam Brooks	Premieres	
Invisible Revolution		Beverly Peterson		American Spectrum	
The Isle		Kim Ki-duk	Kim Ki-duk	World Cinema	
Lost and Delirious				Premieres	
Maelström		Denis Villeneuve	Denis Villeneuve	World Cinema	
Margarita Happy Hour		Ilya Chaiken		American Spectrum	
Memento		Christopher Nolan	Christopher Nolan	Dramatic Competition	Waldo Salt Screenwriting Award
Miss Wonton		Meng Ong		American Spectrum	
Mutant Aliens		Bill Plympton	Bill Plympton	Park City at Midnight	
My First Mister		Christine Lahti		Premieres	
Our Lady of the Assassins	La virgen de los sicarios	Barbet Schroeder	Fernando Vallejo	World Cinema	
Perfume		Michael Rymer	Michael Rymer, L. M. Kit Carson	Premieres	
Possible Loves		Sandra Werneck		World Cinema	
Rejected				Shorts Competition	
The Road Home	我的父親母親	Zhang Yimou	Bao Shi	World Cinema	Audience Award: World Cinema
Scotland, PA		Billy Morrissette	Billy Morrissette	Dramatic Competition	
Scout's Honor		Tom Shepard	Meg Moritz	Documentary Competition	Audience Award: Documentary
Series 7: The Contenders		Daniel Minahan	Daniel Minahan	Premieres	
Sexy Beast		Jonathan Glazer	Louis Mellis, David Scinto	Premieres	
Stranger Inside		Cheryl Dunye			
Super Troopers		Jay Chandrasekhar	Broken Lizard	Park City at Midnight	
Tape		Richard Linklater	Richard Linklater	American Spectrum	
Things Behind the Sun		Allison Anders	Allison Anders	Premieres	
Waking Life		Richard Linklater	Richard Linklater	Premieres	
Wave Twisters				Park City at Midnight	
We Sold Our Souls for Rock 'n Roll		Penelope Spheeris		Park City at Midnight	
Wet Hot American Summer		David Wain	David Wain, Michael Showalter	American Spectrum	
Without a Trace		Maria Novaro		World Cinema	
Women in Film		Bruce Wagner	Bruce Wagner	American Spectrum	

== 2002 ==
Dates: January 10 – January 20

Film name (English)	Film name (Non-English)	Directed By	Written By	Category	Awards
Amandla!: A Revolution in Four-Part Harmony		Lee Hirsch		Documentary Competition	
Alive	Vivante	Sandrine Ray	Sandrine Ray, Antoine Lecomblez	World Cinema Competition	
American Standoff		Kristi Jacobson		Documentary Competition	
A Place on Earth		Artur Aristakisyan		Frontier	
As a Man	L'Afrance	Alain Gomis		World Cinema Competition	
Australian Rules		Paul Goldman	Paul Goldman, Phillip Gwynne	World Cinema Competition	
Bark!		Kasia Adamik	Heather Morgan	Dramatic Competition	
Better Luck Tomorrow		Justin Lin	Ernesto Foronda, Justin Lin, Fabian Marquez	Dramatic Competition	
Birthday Girl		Jez Butterworth	Tom Butterworth, Jez Butterworth	Premieres	
Bloody Sunday		Paul Greengrass	Paul Greengrass	World Cinema Competition	Audience Award: World Cinema (ex-aequo)
Blue Car		Karen Moncrieff	Karen Moncrieff	American Spectrum	
Blue Vinyl		Judith Helfand, Daniel B. Gold		Documentary Competition	
Braingirl: Episode 4, Fishing		Marina Zurkow		Animated Shorts	
Britney, Baby, One More Time		Ludi Boeken	Jonathan Bourne	Park City at Midnight	
The Brother from Another Planet		John Sayles	John Sayles	Sundance Collection (Retrospective)	
Burn				Frontier (Shorts)	
Bus 44	Che Si Shi Si	Dayyan Eng		Shorts	Best Short: Honorable Mention
The Business of Fancydancing		Sherman Alexie		American Spectrum	
By Hook or by Crook		Harry Dodge, Silas Howard		American Spectrum	
Caminantes		Fernando Leon de Aranoa		Native Forum	
Cherish		Finn Taylor	Finn Taylor	Dramatic Competition	
Christmas at Wapos Bay		Dennis Jackson		Native Forum	
Close to Home		Vanessa Roth, Alexandra Dickson		Documentary Competition	
Coastlines		Victor Nuñez	Victor Nuñez	Premieres	
The Cockettes		Bill Weber, David Weissman		Documentary Competition	
Crush		John McKay		Premieres	
Curve		Jacqueline Mikhail		Frontier (Shorts)	
Daddy & Papa		Johnny Symons		Documentary Competition	
The Dancer Upstairs		John Malkovich		Premieres	
The Dangerous Lives of Altar Boys		Peter Care	Jeff Stockwell	Premieres	
Daughter from Danang		Gail Dolgin, Vicente Franco		Documentary Competition	
Decasia		Bill Morrison		Frontier	
Derrida		Kirby Dick, Amy Ziering		Documentary Competition	
Design		Davidson Cole		American Spectrum	
Devil's Playground		Lucy Walker		American Spectrum	
Dog Days		Ulrich Seidl		World Cinema Competition	
Dream Work		Peter Tscherkassky		Frontier (Shorts)	
Empire		Franc Reyes	Franc Reyes	American Showcase	
The Execution of Wanda Jean		Liz Garbus		Documentary Competition	
Face		Bertha Bay-Sa Pan	Bertha Bay-Sa Pan, Oren Moverman	Dramatic Competition	
Family Fundamentals		Arthur Dong		Documentary Competition	
The First 24 Hours		Etienne Sauret		Special Screenings: September 11 (Short)	
From the Ashes—10 Artists		Deborah Shaffer		Special Screenings: September 11	
FUBAR		Michael Dowse		Park City at Midnight	
Gerry		Gus Van Sant	Casey Affleck, Matt Damon, Gus Van Sant	Premieres	
Go! Heat Man!		Mitsuhiko Yazaki		Special Screenings: NHK	
Golden Gate (Palace II)		Fernando Meirelles, Katia Lund		Shorts	
The Good Girl		Miguel Arteta	Mike White	Premieres	
HipHopBattle.com: Hip Hop 4 Life		David Velo Stewart	David Velo Stewart	Park City at Midnight	
Hollywood Hong Kong		Fruit Chan		Park City at Midnight	
Honey for Oshun		Humberto Solas		World Cinema Competition	
Hotere		Merata Mita		Native Forum	
How to Draw a Bunny		John Walter		Documentary Competition	
Human Nature		Michel Gondry	Charlie Kaufman	Premieres	
Hysterical Blindless		Mira Nair	Laura Cahill	Premieres	
The Inner Tour		Ra'anan Alexandrowicz		World Cinema Competition	
Intact	Intacto	Juan Carlos Fresnadillo	Juan Carlos Fresnadillo, Andres Koppel	World Cinema Competition	
I Shout Love		Sarah Polley		Shorts	
The Jimmy Show		Frank Whaley		American Spectrum	
Karmen Geï		Joseph Gaï Ramaka		World Cinema Competition	
The Kid Stays in the Picture		Nanette Burstein		Premieres	
Killing Time		Anthony Jaswinski	Anthony Jaswinski	Dramatic Competition	
Lan Yu		Stanley Kwan	Jimmy Ngai	World Cinema Competition	
The Laramie Project		Moisés Kaufman	Moisés Kaufman	Premieres	
The Last Kiss	L'ultimo bacio	Gabriele Muccino	Gabriele Muccino	World Cinema Competition	Audience Award: World Cinema (ex-aequo)
LA Story		Nick Broomfield		Premieres	
Laundry		Junichi Mori		Special Screenings: NHK	
Loco Fever	La fiebre del loco	Andrés Wood	Andrés Wood, Rene Arcos, Gilberto Villarroel	World Cinema Competition	
Lola		Carl Bessai	Carl Bessai	World Cinema Competition	
Love in the Time of Money		Peter Mattei	Peter Mattei	Dramatic Competition	
Love Liza		Todd Louiso	Gordy Hoffman	Dramatic Competition	Waldo Salt Screenwriting Award
Lubov and Other Nightmares	Lubor i Drugie Koshmari	Andrei Nekrasov	Andrei Nekrasov	World Cinema Competition	
Lucky Break		Peter Cattaneo		Premieres	
The Man from Elysian Fields		George Hickenlooper		Premieres	
Manito		Eric Eason	Eric Eason	Dramatic Competition	
May		Lucky McKee	Lucky McKee	Park City at Midnight	
Miranda		Marc Munden	Rob Young	World Cinema Competition	
Miss America		Lisa Ades		Documentary Competition	
Missing Young Woman	Senorita Extraviada	Lourdes Portillo		Documentary Competition	
Miss 501: A Portrait of Luck		Jules Karatechamp		Native Forum	
Narc		Joe Carnahan	Joe Carnahan	Dramatic Competition	
Native American in Manhattan		Steve Bilich		Frontier (Shorts)	
Noon Blue Apples		Jay Lee		American Spectrum	
One Hour Photo		Mark Romanek	Mark Romanek	Premieres	
One Night the Moon		Rachel Perkins	Rachel Perkins, John Romeril	Native Forum + Frontier	
On_Line		Jed Weintrob	Andrew Osbourne, Jed Weintrob	American Spectrum	
Our America		Ernest Dickerson		Premieres	
Paradox Lake		Przemyslaw Shemie Reut	Przemyslaw Shemie Reut, Wieslaw Saniewski	Dramatic Competition	
Passage		Chel White		Frontier (Shorts)	
Personal Velocity: Three Portraits		Rebecca Miller	Rebecca Miller	Dramatic Competition	Grand Jury Prize: Dramatic
Places		Kinya Hanada		Animated Shorts	
Pumpkin		Adam Larson Broder, Tony R. Abrams	Adam Larson Broder	Dramatic Competition	
Quitting		Zhang Yang	Zhang Yang, Huo Xin	World Cinema Competition	
Rain		Christine Jeffs	Christine Jeffs	World Cinema Competition	
Rain		Katherine Lindberg	Katherine Lindberg	American Spectrum	
Ralph Ellison: An American Journey		Avon Kirkland		Documentary Competition	
Rancho California (Por Favor)		John T. Caldwell		Frontier	
Real Women Have Curves		Patricia Cardoso	Josefina López, George LaVoo	Dramatic Competition	Audience Award: Dramatic
Run Ronnie Run!		Troy Miller		Premieres	
Secretary		Steven Shainberg	Erin Cressida Wilson	Dramatic Competition	Special Jury Prize: Originality
Sex and Lucia	Lucía y el sexo	Julio Medem	Julio Medem	World Cinema Competition	
Shadows		John Cassavetes	John Cassavetes	Sundance Collection (Retrospective)	
Siren		Abigail Severance		Frontier (Shorts)	
Sister Helen		Rob Fruchtman, Rebecca Cammisa		Documentary Competition	
Site		Jason Kliot		Special Screenings: September 11 (Short)	
Ski Bums		John Zaritsky		Special Screenings	
Skins		Chris Eyre		Premieres	
The Slaughter Rule		Alex Smith, Andrew Smith	Alex Smith, Andrew Smith	Dramatic Competition	
Smokers Only		Verónica Chen		World Cinema Competition	
Soft for Digging		JT Petty		Frontier	
Soft Shell Man		André Turpin	André Turpin	World Cinema Competition	
Spare Me		Guinevere Turner		Shorts	
Stolen Summer		Pete Jones	Pete Jones	American Spectrum	
Storytelling		Todd Solondz	Todd Solondz	American Showcase	
Streeters		Gerardo Tort	Marina Stavenhagen	World Cinema Competition	
Stuck		Jamie Babbit		Shorts	
Taboo		Max Makowski	Chris Fisher	Park City at Midnight	
The tale of the floating world		Alain Escaille		Frontier (Shorts)	
Tadpole		Gary Winick	Niels Mueller, Heather McGowan	Dramatic Competition	Directing Award: Dramatic
Tears of the Black Tiger		Wisit Sasanatieng	Wisit Sasanatieng	World Cinema Competition	
Teknolust		Lynn Hershman Leeson	Lynn Hershman Leeson	American Showcase	
Texas		Russell Crowe, Brett Leonard		Special Screenings	
That's My Face	E Minha Cara	Thomas Allen Harris		American Spectrum	
Thirteen Conversations About One Thing	13 Conversations About One Thing	Jill Sprecher	Jill Sprecher, Karen Sprecher	American Showcase	
Time Out	L'Emploi du temps	Laurent Cantet	Laurent Cantet, Robin Campillo	World Cinema Competition	
Touch		Jeremy Podeswa		Frontier (Shorts)	
The Trespasser	O Invasor	Beto Brant	Beto Brant, Marcal Aquino	World Cinema Competition	
Two Towns of Jasper		Whitney Dow, Marco Williams		Documentary Competition	
Under the Skin of the City	Zir-e Poust-e Shahr	Rakhshān Banietemad	Rakhshān Banietemad, Farid Mostafavi	World Cinema Competition	
Voice of the Prophet		Robert Edwards		Special Screenings: September 11	
We Are Family		Danny Schechter		Special Screenings: September 11	
Where Eskimos Live		Tomasz Wiszniewski		World Cinema Competition	
World Traveler		Bart Freundlich	Bart Freundlich	American Showcase	
XX/XY		Austin Chick	Austin Chick	Dramatic Competition	
Y tu mamá también		Alfonso Cuarón	Alfonso Cuarón, Carlos Cuarón	Special Screenings	

== 2003 ==
Dates: January 16 – January 26

See the 2003 Sundance Film Festival article for a full list of films shown and award winners.

== 2004 ==
Dates: January 15 – January 25

See the 2004 Sundance Film Festival article for a full list of films shown and award winners.

== 2005 ==
Dates: January 20 – January 30

See the 2005 Sundance Film Festival article for a full list of films shown and award winners.

== 2006 ==
Dates: January 19 – January 29

See the 2006 Sundance Film Festival article for a full list of films shown and award winners.

== 2007 ==
Dates: January 18 – January 28

See the 2007 Sundance Film Festival article for a full list of award winners. See the List of films at the 2007 Sundance Film Festival article for a full list of films shown.

== 2008 ==
Dates: January 17 – January 27

See the 2008 Sundance Film Festival article for a full list of award winners. See the List of films at the 2008 Sundance Film Festival article for a full list of films shown.

== 2009 ==
Dates: January 15 – January 25

See the 2009 Sundance Film Festival article for a full list of award winners. See the List of films at the 2009 Sundance Film Festival article for a full list of films shown.

== 2010 ==
Dates: January 21 – January 31

See the 2010 Sundance Film Festival article for a full list of award winners. See the List of films at the 2010 Sundance Film Festival article for a full list of films shown.

== 2011 ==
Dates: January 20 – January 30

See the 2011 Sundance Film Festival article for a full list of award winners. See the List of films at the 2011 Sundance Film Festival article for a full list of films shown.

== 2012 ==
Dates: January 19 – January 29

See the 2012 Sundance Film Festival article for a full list of films shown and award winners.

== 2013 ==
Dates: January 17 – January 27

See the 2013 Sundance Film Festival article for a full list of films shown and award winners.

== 2014 ==
Dates: January 16 – January 26

See the 2014 Sundance Film Festival article for a full list of award winners. See the List of films at the 2014 Sundance Film Festival article for a full list of films shown.

== 2015 ==
Dates: January 22 – February 1

See the 2015 Sundance Film Festival article for a full list of award winners. See the List of films at the 2015 Sundance Film Festival article for a full list of films shown.

== 2016 ==
Dates: January 21 – January 31

See the 2016 Sundance Film Festival article for a full list of films shown and award winners.

== 2017 ==
Dates: January 19 – January 29

See the 2017 Sundance Film Festival article for a full list of films shown and award winners.

== 2018 ==
Dates: January 18 – January 28

See the 2018 Sundance Film Festival article for a full list of films shown and award winners.

== 2019 ==
Dates: January 24 – February 3

See the 2019 Sundance Film Festival article for a full list of films shown and award winners.

== 2020 ==
Dates: January 23 – February 2

See the 2020 Sundance Film Festival article for a full list of films shown and award winners.

== 2021 ==
Dates: January 28 – February 3

See the 2021 Sundance Film Festival article for a full list of films shown and award winners.

== 2022 ==
Dates: January 20 – January 30

See the 2022 Sundance Film Festival article for a full list of films shown and award winners.

== 2023 ==
Dates: January 19 – January 29

See the 2023 Sundance Film Festival article for a full list of films shown and award winners.

== 2024 ==
Dates: January 18 – January 28

See the 2024 Sundance Film Festival article for a full list of films shown and award winners.

== 2025 ==
Dates: January 23 – February 2

See the 2025 Sundance Film Festival article for a full list of films shown and award winners.

== 2026 ==
Dates: January 22 – February 1

See the 2026 Sundance Film Festival article for a full list of films shown and award winners.

== 2027 ==
Dates: January 21 – January 31

See the 2027 Sundance Film Festival article for a full list of films shown and award winners.
