= List of films considered as New Hollywood =

This is the list of films considered by various sources as part of the New Hollywood era.

== Background ==
The New Hollywood, Hollywood Renaissance, or American New Wave, was a movement in American film history from the mid-1960s to the early 1980s, when a new generation of filmmakers came to prominence. They influenced the types of film produced, their production and marketing, and the way the major film studios approached filmmaking. In New Hollywood films, the film director, rather than the studio, took on a key authorial role.

The definition of "New Hollywood" varies, depending on the author, with some defining it as a movement and others as a period. The span of the period is also a subject of debate, as well as its integrity, as some authors, such as Thomas Schatz, argue that the New Hollywood consists of several different movements. The films made in this movement are stylistically characterized in that their narrative often deviated from classical norms. After the demise of the studio system and the rise of television, the commercial success of films was diminished.

Successful films of the early New Hollywood era include Bonnie and Clyde, The Graduate and Easy Rider while films whose box office failure marked the end of the era include New York, New York, Sorcerer, Heaven's Gate, They All Laughed, and One from the Heart.

== Films of the movement ==
This is a chronological list of films that are generally considered to be "New Hollywood" productions:

=== 1960s ===
==== 1965–1969 ====
- The Cincinnati Kid (1965)
- The Hill (1965)
- The Loved One (1965)
- Major Dundee (1965)
- Mickey One (1965)
- A Thousand Clowns (1965)
- An American Dream (1966)
- The Chase (1966)
- Dutchman (1966)
- Grand Prix (1966)
- The Group (1966)
- Hold Me While I'm Naked (1966)
- Lord Love a Duck (1966)
- A Man Called Adam (1966)
- Our Man Flint (1966)
- The Professionals (1966)
- Ride in the Whirlwind (1966)
- The Sand Pebbles (1966)
- Seconds (1966)
- The Shooting (1966)
- This Property Is Condemned (1966)
- Who's Afraid of Virginia Woolf? (1966)
- The Wild Angels (1966)
- You're a Big Boy Now (1966)
- Barefoot in the Park (1967)
- The Big Shave (1967)
- Bonnie and Clyde (1967)
- The Born Losers (1967)
- Cool Hand Luke (1967)
- Countdown (1967)
- David Holzman's Diary (1967)
- The Dirty Dozen (1967)
- Dont Look Back (1967)
- Games (1967)
- The Graduate (1967)
- Guess Who's Coming to Dinner (1967)
- Hells Angels on Wheels (1967)
- Hombre (1967)
- In Cold Blood (1967)
- In the Heat of the Night (1967)
- The Incident (1967)
- Point Blank (1967)
- Portrait of Jason (1967)
- The President's Analyst (1967)
- The Producers (1967)
- Reflections in a Golden Eye (1967)
- Spring Night, Summer Night (1967)
- Sweet Love, Bitter (1967)
- The St. Valentine's Day Massacre (1967)
- Titicut Follies (1967)
- The Trip (1967)
- Two for the Road (1967)
- Up the Down Staircase (1967)
- Valley of the Dolls (1967)
- Wait Until Dark (1967)
- Who's That Knocking at My Door (1967)
- 2001: A Space Odyssey (1968)
- The Boston Strangler (1968)
- The Brotherhood (1968)
- Bullitt (1968)
- Bye Bye Braverman (1968)
- Coogan's Bluff (1968)
- The Detective (1968)
- The Edge (1968)
- Faces (1968)
- Finian's Rainbow (1968)
- Funny Girl (1968)
- Greetings (1968)
- Head (1968)
- Hell in the Pacific (1968)
- High School (1968)
- I Love You, Alice B. Toklas (1968)
- The Legend of Lylah Clare (1968)
- Madigan (1968)
- Monterey Pop (1968)
- Murder a la Mod (1968)
- Night of the Living Dead (1968)
- The Night They Raided Minsky's (1968)
- No Way to Treat a Lady (1968)
- Once Upon a Time in the West (1968)
- The Party (1968)
- Petulia (1968)
- Planet of the Apes (1968)
- Pretty Poison (1968)
- Psych-Out (1968)
- Rachel, Rachel (1968)
- Rosemary's Baby (1968)
- The Sergeant (1968)
- Skidoo (1968)
- The Split (1968)
- The Swimmer (1968)
- Symbiopsychotaxiplasm: Take One (1968)
- Targets (1968)
- The Thomas Crown Affair (1968)
- Uptight (1968)
- Wild in the Streets (1968)
- Will Penny (1968)
- Alice's Restaurant (1969)
- Angel, Angel, Down We Go (1969)
- Bob & Carol & Ted & Alice (1969)
- Butch Cassidy and the Sundance Kid (1969)
- Castle Keep (1969)
- Changes (1969)
- Coming Apart (1969)
- Downhill Racer (1969)
- Easy Rider (1969)
- Goodbye, Columbus (1969)
- The Gypsy Moths (1969)
- The Happy Ending (1969)
- Hell's Angels '69 (1969)
- Jenny (1969)
- John and Mary (1969)
- Last Summer (1969)
- The Learning Tree (1969)
- Lions Love (1969)
- Marlowe (1969)
- Marooned (1969)
- Me, Natalie (1969)
- Medium Cool (1969)
- Midnight Cowboy (1969)
- Model Shop (1969)
- Out of It (1969)
- Pit Stop (1969)
- Popi (1969)
- Putney Swope (1969)
- The Rain People (1969)
- Salesman (1969)
- The Sterile Cuckoo (1969)
- Sweet Charity (1969)
- Take the Money and Run (1969)
- Tell Them Willie Boy Is Here (1969)
- That Cold Day in the Park (1969)
- They Shoot Horses, Don't They? (1969)
- A Time for Dying (1969)
- Topaz (1969)
- True Grit (1969)
- The Wedding Party (1969)
- What Ever Happened to Aunt Alice? (1969)
- Where It's At (1969)
- The Wild Bunch (1969)

=== 1970s ===
==== 1970–1971 ====
- Adam at 6 A.M. (1970)
- Airport (1970)
- Alex in Wonderland (1970)
- The Baby Maker (1970)
- The Ballad of Cable Hogue (1970)
- Beneath the Planet of the Apes (1970)
- Beyond the Valley of the Dolls (1970)
- Bloody Mama (1970)
- The Boys in the Band (1970)
- Brewster McCloud (1970)
- Catch-22 (1970)
- Cotton Comes to Harlem (1970)
- Cover Me Babe (1970)
- Diary of a Mad Housewife (1970)
- Didn't You Hear? (1970)
- Dirty Dingus Magee (1970)
- End of the Road (1970)
- Five Easy Pieces (1970)
- Flap (1970)
- Gas-s-s-s (1970)
- Getting Straight (1970)
- Gimme Shelter (1970)
- The Great White Hope (1970)
- Halls of Anger (1970)
- Hi, Mom! (1970)
- The Honeymoon Killers (1970)
- Husbands (1970)
- I Am Somebody (1970)
- Ice (1970)
- I Love My...Wife (1970)
- I Never Sang for My Father (1970)
- I Walk the Line (1970)
- Joe (1970)
- Kelly's Heroes (1970)
- The Landlord (1970)
- Last of the Mobile Hot Shots (1970)
- The Liberation of L.B. Jones (1970)
- Little Big Man (1970)
- Little Fauss and Big Halsy (1970)
- Love Story (1970)
- Loving (1970)
- The Magic Garden of Stanley Sweetheart (1970)
- Maidstone (1970)
- A Man Called Horse (1970)
- M*A*S*H (1970)
- Move (1970)
- Myra Breckinridge (1970)
- On a Clear Day You Can See Forever (1970)
- The Owl and the Pussycat (1970)
- The Out-of-Towners (1970)
- Patton (1970)
- The People Next Door (1970)
- Puzzle of a Downfall Child (1970)
- Quackser Fortune Has a Cousin in the Bronx (1970)
- The Revolutionary (1970)
- R.P.M. (1970)
- The Sidelong Glances of a Pigeon Kicker (1970)
- Soldier Blue (1970)
- Something for Everyone (1970)
- Start the Revolution Without Me (1970)
- Stop! (1970)
- The Strawberry Statement (1970)
- Street Scenes 1970 (1970)
- The Student Nurses (1970)
- Tell Me That You Love Me, Junie Moon (1970)
- ...Tick...Tick...Tick... (1970)
- The Traveling Executioner (1970)
- Tropic of Cancer (1970)
- Two Mules for Sister Sara (1970)
- Wanda (1970)
- Watermelon Man (1970)
- Where's Poppa? (1970)
- Woodstock (1970)
- WUSA (1970)
- Zabriskie Point (1970)
- $ (1971)
- 200 Motels (1971)
- The Anderson Tapes (1971)
- The Andromeda Strain (1971)
- Bananas (1971)
- Been Down So Long It Looks Like Up to Me (1971)
- The Beguiled (1971)
- Billy Jack (1971)
- Born to Win (1971)
- Carnal Knowledge (1971)
- Chandler (1971)
- The Christian Licorice Store (1971)
- Cisco Pike (1971)
- A Clockwork Orange (1971)
- Desperate Characters (1971)
- The Devils (1971)
- Dirty Harry (1971)
- "Doc" (1971)
- Drive, He Said (1971)
- Duel (1971)
- Dusty and Sweets McGee (1971)
- Escape from the Planet of the Apes (1971)
- Fiddler on the Roof (1971)
- The French Connection (1971)
- Glen and Randa (1971)
- Going Home (1971)
- Growing Up Female (1971)
- Happy Birthday, Wanda June (1971)
- Harold and Maude (1971)
- The Hired Hand (1971)
- The Horsemen (1971)
- The Hospital (1971)
- The Hunting Party (1971)
- Johnny Got His Gun (1971)
- Klute (1971)
- The Last Movie (1971)
- The Last Picture Show (1971)
- The Last Run (1971)
- Let's Scare Jessica to Death (1971)
- Little Murders (1971)
- Making It (1971)
- McCabe & Mrs. Miller (1971)
- Minnie and Moskowitz (1971)
- A New Leaf (1971)
- The Panic in Needle Park (1971)
- Play Misty for Me (1971)
- Pretty Maids All in a Row (1971)
- Punishment Park (1971)
- The Pursuit of Happiness (1971)
- A Safe Place (1971)
- Shaft (1971)
- Some of My Best Friends Are... (1971)
- Sometimes a Great Notion (1971)
- The Sporting Club (1971)
- Straw Dogs (1971)
- Such Good Friends (1971)
- Sweet Sweetback's Baadasssss Song (1971)
- Taking Off (1971)
- The Telephone Book (1971)
- They Might Be Giants (1971)
- THX 1138 (1971)
- The Todd Killings (1971)
- The Touch (1971)
- T.R. Baskin (1971)
- Two-Lane Blacktop (1971)
- Vanishing Point (1971)
- Walkabout (1971)
- Welcome Home, Soldier Boys (1971)
- What's the Matter with Helen? (1971)
- Wild Rovers (1971)
- Willy Wonka & the Chocolate Factory (1971)

==== 1972–1973 ====
- Across 110th Street (1972)
- Avanti! (1972)
- Bad Company (1972)
- Bone (1972)
- Boxcar Bertha (1972)
- Butterflies Are Free (1972)
- Cabaret (1972)
- The Candidate (1972)
- The Carey Treatment (1972)
- Child's Play (1972)
- Conquest of the Planet of the Apes (1972)
- The Culpepper Cattle Co. (1972)
- Dealing: Or the Berkeley-to-Boston Forty-Brick Lost-Bag Blues (1972)
- Deep Throat (1972)
- Deliverance (1972)
- The Effect of Gamma Rays on Man-in-the-Moon Marigolds (1972)
- Fat City (1972)
- Fritz the Cat (1972)
- Frogs (1972)
- F.T.A. (1972)
- Fuzz (1972)
- Get to Know Your Rabbit (1972)
- The Getaway (1972)
- The Godfather (1972)
- The Great Northfield, Minnesota Raid (1972)
- The Heartbreak Kid (1972)
- Hickey & Boggs (1972)
- The Hot Rock (1972)
- Images (1972)
- Jeremiah Johnson (1972)
- Junior Bonner (1972)
- Kansas City Bomber (1972)
- The King of Marvin Gardens (1972)
- Lady Sings the Blues (1972)
- Last of the Red Hot Lovers (1972)
- The Last House on the Left (1972)
- The Life and Times of Judge Roy Bean (1972)
- Limbo (1972)
- The Limit (1972)
- The Loners (1972)
- The Mechanic (1972)
- The New Centurions (1972)
- One Is a Lonely Number (1972)
- The Other (1972)
- Painters Painting (1972)
- Pete 'n' Tillie (1972)
- Pink Flamingos (1972)
- Play It Again, Sam (1972)
- Play It as It Lays (1972)
- Pocket Money (1972)
- Portnoy's Complaint (1972)
- The Poseidon Adventure (1972)
- The Possession of Joel Delaney (1972)
- Prime Cut (1972)
- Silent Running (1972)
- Sisters (1972)
- Slaughterhouse-Five (1972)
- Sounder (1972)
- Super Fly (1972)
- To Find a Man (1972)
- To Kill a Clown (1972)
- Tomorrow (1972)
- Ulzana's Raid (1972)
- Unholy Rollers (1972)
- Up the Sandbox (1972)
- The Visitors (1972)
- What's Up, Doc? (1972)
- You'll Like My Mother (1972)
- American Graffiti (1973)
- The Baby (1973)
- Badge 373 (1973)
- Badlands (1973)
- Bang the Drum Slowly (1973)
- Battle for the Planet of the Apes (1973)
- Blume in Love (1973)
- Breezy (1973)
- Charley Varrick (1973)
- Cinderella Liberty (1973)
- Coffy (1973)
- Cops and Robbers (1973)
- The Day of the Dolphin (1973)
- Dillinger (1973)
- A Doll's House (1973)
- The Don Is Dead (1973)
- Electra Glide in Blue (1973)
- Emperor of the North Pole (1973)
- Enter the Dragon (1973)
- The Exorcist (1973)
- The Friends of Eddie Coyle (1973)
- Heavy Traffic (1973)
- High Plains Drifter (1973)
- The Iceman Cometh (1973)
- Jesus Christ Superstar (1973)
- Jonathan Living Seagull (1973)
- The Last American Hero (1973)
- The Last Detail (1973)
- The Last of Sheila (1973)
- The Laughing Policeman (1973)
- Lolly-Madonna XXX (1973)
- The Long Goodbye (1973)
- Love and Pain and the Whole Damn Thing (1973)
- The MacKintosh Man (1973)
- Magnum Force (1973)
- Mean Streets (1973)
- The Outfit (1973)
- The Paper Chase (1973)
- Paper Moon (1973)
- Pat Garrett and Billy the Kid (1973)
- Payday (1973)
- Save the Tiger (1973)
- Scarecrow (1973)
- Serpico (1973)
- The Seven-Ups (1973)
- Sleeper (1973)
- Soylent Green (1973)
- The Spook Who Sat by the Door (1973)
- Sssssss (1973)
- Steelyard Blues (1973)
- The Sting (1973)
- Terminal Island (1973)
- Walking Tall (1973)
- Wattstax (1973)
- The Way We Were (1973)
- Westworld (1973)
- White Lightning (1973)

==== 1974–1975 ====
- 99 and 44/100% Dead (1974)
- Alice Doesn't Live Here Anymore (1974)
- Attica (1974)
- Blazing Saddles (1974)
- Buster and Billie (1974)
- Busting (1974)
- Bring Me the Head of Alfredo Garcia (1974)
- Caged Heat (1974)
- California Split (1974)
- Chinatown (1974)
- Claudine (1974)
- Cockfighter (1974)
- The Conversation (1974)
- Crazy Joe (1974)
- Daisy Miller (1974)
- Dark Star (1974)
- Death Wish (1974)
- The Dion Brothers (1974)
- Dirty Mary, Crazy Larry (1974)
- Earthquake (1974)
- Female Trouble (1974)
- For Pete's Sake (1974)
- Foxy Brown (1974)
- Freebie and the Bean (1974)
- The Gambler (1974)
- Ganja & Hess (1974)
- Ginger in the Morning (1974)
- The Godfather Part II (1974)
- Gone in 60 Seconds (1974)
- The Great Gatsby (1974)
- Harry and Tonto (1974)
- Hearts and Minds (1974)
- Law and Disorder (1974)
- Lenny (1974)
- The Longest Yard (1974)
- The Lords of Flatbush (1974)
- Lovin' Molly (1974)
- Luther (1974)
- Macon County Line (1974)
- Man on a Swing (1974)
- McQ (1974)
- Messiah of Evil (1974)
- The Midnight Man (1974)
- The Nickel Ride (1974)
- The Parallax View (1974)
- Phantom of the Paradise (1974)
- Phase IV (1974)
- Shanks (1974)
- The Spikes Gang (1974)
- The Sugarland Express (1974)
- The Super Cops (1974)
- The Taking of Pelham One Two Three (1974)
- The Texas Chain Saw Massacre (1974)
- Thieves Like Us (1974)
- Three the Hard Way (1974)
- Thunderbolt and Lightfoot (1974)
- The Towering Inferno (1974)
- Uptown Saturday Night (1974)
- The White Dawn (1974)
- Who? (1974)
- A Woman Under the Influence (1974)
- The Yakuza (1974)
- Young Frankenstein (1974)
- Zardoz (1974)
- 92 in the Shade (1975)
- Aloha, Bobby and Rose (1975)
- At Long Last Love (1975)
- Barry Lyndon (1975)
- Bite the Bullet (1975)
- A Boy and His Dog (1975)
- Cooley High (1975)
- Coonskin (1975)
- The Day of the Locust (1975)
- Dog Day Afternoon (1975)
- The Eiger Sanction (1975)
- Farewell, My Lovely (1975)
- French Connection II (1975)
- Funny Lady (1975)
- The Great Waldo Pepper (1975)
- Hard Times (1975)
- Hearts of the West (1975)
- Hester Street (1975)
- The "Human" Factor (1975)
- Hustle (1975)
- Jaws (1975)
- The Killer Elite (1975)
- Let's Do It Again (1975)
- Loose Ends (1975)
- Love and Death (1975)
- Lucky Lady (1975)
- Milestones (1975)
- Nashville (1975)
- Night Moves (1975)
- One Flew Over the Cuckoo's Nest (1975)
- The Prisoner of Second Avenue (1975)
- Race with the Devil (1975)
- Rafferty and the Gold Dust Twins (1975)
- Rancho Deluxe (1975)
- Report to the Commissioner (1975)
- The Rocky Horror Picture Show (1975)
- Rollerball (1975)
- Shampoo (1975)
- Smile (1975)
- The Stepford Wives (1975)
- The Sunshine Boys (1975)
- That's The Way of the World (1975)
- Three Days of the Condor (1975)
- The Wind and the Lion (1975)

==== 1976–1977 ====
- All the President's Men (1976)
- Assault on Precinct 13 (1976)
- The Bad News Bears (1976)
- The Big Bus (1976)
- The Bingo Long Traveling All-Stars & Motor Kings (1976)
- Bound for Glory (1976)
- Bugsy Malone (1976)
- Buffalo Bill and the Indians, or Sitting Bull's History Lesson (1976)
- Car Wash (1976)
- Carrie (1976)
- Family Plot (1976)
- Fighting Mad (1976)
- The First Nudie Musical (1976)
- The Front (1976)
- Futureworld (1976)
- God Told Me To (1976)
- Harlan County, USA (1976)
- Harry and Walter Go to New York (1976)
- Heartworn Highways (1976)
- The Killer Inside Me (1976)
- The Killing of a Chinese Bookie (1976)
- The Last Hard Men (1976)
- The Last Tycoon (1976)
- Leadbelly (1976)
- Lifeguard (1976)
- Logan's Run (1976)
- Marathon Man (1976)
- Mikey and Nicky (1976)
- The Missouri Breaks (1976)
- Mother, Jugs and Speed (1976)
- Network (1976)
- Next Stop, Greenwich Village (1976)
- Nickelodeon (1976)
- Not a Pretty Picture (1976)
- Obsession (1976)
- The Omen (1976)
- The Outlaw Josey Wales (1976)
- The Ritz (1976)
- Rocky (1976)
- The Shootist (1976)
- Silver Streak (1976)
- A Star Is Born (1976)
- Stay Hungry (1976)
- Sweet Revenge (1976)
- Taxi Driver (1976)
- Trackdown (1976)
- Tracks (1976)
- Underground (1976)
- Voyage of the Damned (1976)
- Welcome to L.A. (1976)
- 3 Women (1977)
- Annie Hall (1977)
- Audrey Rose (1977)
- Between the Lines (1977)
- Black Sunday (1977)
- Bobby Deerfield (1977)
- Casey's Shadow (1977)
- Close Encounters of the Third Kind (1977)
- The Domino Principle (1977)
- Equus (1977)
- Eraserhead (1977)
- Fun with Dick and Jane (1977)
- The Gauntlet (1977)
- The Goodbye Girl (1977)
- Grand Theft Auto (1977)
- Handle with Care (1977)
- A Hell of a Note (1977)
- Heroes (1977)
- High Anxiety (1977)
- The Hills Have Eyes (1977)
- I Never Promised You a Rose Garden (1977)
- Islands in the Stream (1977)
- Joyride (1977)
- Julia (1977)
- The Kentucky Fried Movie (1977)
- Last Chants for a Slow Dance (1977)
- The Late Show (1977)
- Looking for Mr. Goodbar (1977)
- The Mafu Cage (1977)
- Martin (1977)
- New York, New York (1977)
- Oh, God! (1977)
- Opening Night (1977)
- The Other Side of Midnight (1977)
- The Private Files of J. Edgar Hoover (1977)
- Rolling Thunder (1977)
- Saturday Night Fever (1977)
- Semi-Tough (1977)
- The Sentinel (1977)
- September 30, 1955 (1977)
- Short Eyes (1977)
- Slap Shot (1977)
- Smokey and the Bandit (1977)
- Sorcerer (1977)
- Star Wars (1977)
- The Turning Point (1977)
- Twilight's Last Gleaming (1977)
- Which Way Is Up? (1977)
- Wizards (1977)

==== 1978–1979 ====
- American Boy: A Profile of Steven Prince (1978)
- American Hot Wax (1978)
- Animal House (1978)
- The Big Fix (1978)
- Big Wednesday (1978)
- Bloodbrothers (1978)
- Blue Collar (1978)
- The Brink's Job (1978)
- The Buddy Holly Story (1978)
- California Suite (1978)
- Capricorn One (1978)
- Coma (1978)
- Comes a Horseman (1978)
- Coming Home (1978)
- Convoy (1978)
- Corvette Summer (1978)
- Dawn of the Dead (1978)
- Days of Heaven (1978)
- The Deer Hunter (1978)
- The Driver (1978)
- Every Which Way but Loose (1978)
- Eyes of Laura Mars (1978)
- Fingers (1978)
- F.I.S.T. (1978)
- Foul Play (1978)
- The Fury (1978)
- Girlfriends (1978)
- Go Tell the Spartans (1978)
- Goin' South (1978)
- Grease (1978)
- Halloween (1978)
- Heaven Can Wait (1978)
- Ice Castles (1978)
- Interiors (1978)
- Invasion of the Body Snatchers (1978)
- Killer of Sheep (1978)
- King of the Gypsies (1978)
- The Last Waltz (1978)
- The Lord of the Rings (1978)
- Magic (1978)
- Movie Movie (1978)
- Northern Lights (1978)
- On the Yard (1978)
- Paradise Alley (1978)
- Piranha (1978)
- Pretty Baby (1978)
- Remember My Name (1978)
- Same Time, Next Year (1978)
- The Scenic Route (1978)
- Sgt. Pepper's Lonely Hearts Club Band (1978)
- Stony Island (1978)
- Straight Time (1978)
- Superman (1978)
- Thank God It's Friday (1978)
- Uncle Joe Shannon (1978)
- An Unmarried Woman (1978)
- A Wedding (1978)
- The Whole Shootin' Match (1978)
- Who'll Stop the Rain (1978)
- The Wiz (1978)
- 10 (1979)
- 1941 (1979)
- Alien (1979)
- All That Jazz (1979)
- An Almost Perfect Affair (1979)
- Americathon (1979)
- The Amityville Horror (1979)
- ...And Justice for All. (1979)
- Apocalypse Now (1979)
- Being There (1979)
- The Black Stallion (1979)
- Breaking Away (1979)
- Bush Mama (1979)
- Chilly Scenes of Winter (1979)
- The China Syndrome (1979)
- The Driller Killer (1979)
- The Electric Horseman (1979)
- Escape from Alcatraz (1979)
- Going in Style (1979)
- Good Luck, Miss Wyckoff (1979)
- The Great Santini (1979)
- Hair (1979)
- Hardcore (1979)
- The In-Laws (1979)
- Killing Time (1979)
- Kramer vs. Kramer (1979)
- The Lady in Red (1979)
- Last Embrace (1979)
- Manhattan (1979)
- More American Graffiti (1979)
- The Muppet Movie (1979)
- Natural Enemies (1979)
- Norma Rae (1979)
- North Dallas Forty (1979)
- Old Boyfriends (1979)
- The Onion Field (1979)
- Over the Edge (1979)
- A Perfect Couple (1979)
- Promises in the Dark (1979)
- Real Life (1979)
- Rock and Roll High School (1979)
- Rocky II (1979)
- The Rose (1979)
- Saint Jack (1979)
- Star Trek: The Motion Picture (1979)
- Starting Over (1979)
- Time After Time (1979)
- The Warriors (1979)
- When a Stranger Calls (1979)
- When You Comin' Back, Red Ryder? (1979)
- Winter Kills (1979)
- Wise Blood (1979)

=== 1980s ===
==== 1980–1983 ====
- 9 to 5 (1980)
- Airplane! (1980)
- American Gigolo (1980)
- Any Which Way You Can (1980)
- Atlantic City (1980)
- The Big Red One (1980)
- The Blue Lagoon (1980)
- The Blues Brothers (1980)
- Bronco Billy (1980)
- Brubaker (1980)
- Can't Stop the Music (1980)
- Coal Miner's Daughter (1980)
- Cruising (1980)
- Dressed to Kill (1980)
- The Elephant Man (1980)
- The Empire Strikes Back (1980)
- Fame (1980)
- Fatso (1980)
- The Fog (1980)
- Foxes (1980)
- Gloria (1980)
- HealtH (1980)
- Heaven's Gate (1980)
- Honeysuckle Rose (1980)
- Inside Moves (1980)
- It's My Turn (1980)
- The Jazz Singer (1980)
- Just Tell Me What You Want (1980)
- The Long Riders (1980)
- Melvin (and Howard) (1980)
- Night of the Juggler (1980)
- The Ninth Configuration (1980)
- One-Trick Pony (1980)
- Ordinary People (1980)
- Out of the Blue (1980)
- Popeye (1980)
- Private Benjamin (1980)
- Raging Bull (1980)
- Return of the Secaucus 7 (1980)
- The Shining (1980)
- Somewhere in Time (1980)
- Stardust Memories (1980)
- Stir Crazy (1980)
- The Stunt Man (1980)
- Superman II (1980)
- Tell Me a Riddle (1980)
- Times Square (1980)
- Urban Cowboy (1980)
- When Time Ran Out (1980)
- Willie & Phil (1980)
- Windows (1980)
- Xanadu (1980)
- All Night Long (1981)
- ...All the Marbles (1981)
- An American Werewolf in London (1981)
- Arthur (1981)
- Blow Out (1981)
- Body Heat (1981)
- The Cannonball Run (1981)
- Cutter's Way (1981)
- Escape from New York (1981)
- The Evil Dead (1981)
- Fort Apache, the Bronx (1981)
- Four Friends (1981)
- The Funhouse (1981)
- History of the World, Part I (1981)
- The Howling (1981)
- Knightriders (1981)
- Modern Romance (1981)
- Mommie Dearest (1981)
- Ms. 45 (1981)
- On Golden Pond (1981)
- Outland (1981)
- Pennies from Heaven (1981)
- The Postman Always Rings Twice (1981)
- Prince of the City (1981)
- Raggedy Man (1981)
- Ragtime (1981)
- Raiders of the Lost Ark (1981)
- Reds (1981)
- S.O.B. (1981)
- Southern Comfort (1981)
- They All Laughed (1981)
- Thief (1981)
- Whose Life Is It Anyway? (1981)
- Wolfen (1981)
- 48 Hrs. (1982)
- Annie (1982)
- The Best Little Whorehouse in Texas (1982)
- Blade Runner (1982)
- Cannery Row (1982)
- Cat People (1982)
- Come Back to the 5 & Dime, Jimmy Dean, Jimmy Dean (1982)
- Conan the Barbarian (1982)
- Diner (1982)
- E.T. the Extra-Terrestrial (1982)
- Fast Times at Ridgemont High (1982)
- First Blood (1982)
- Grease 2 (1982)
- The King of Comedy (1982)
- Losing Ground (1982)
- A Midsummer Night's Sex Comedy (1982)
- Missing (1982)
- My Favorite Year (1982)
- An Officer and a Gentlemen (1982)
- One from the Heart (1982)
- Personal Best (1982)
- Poltergeist (1982)
- Rocky III (1982)
- Shoot the Moon (1982)
- Split Image (1982)
- Star Trek II: The Wrath of Khan (1982)
- Summer Lovers (1982)
- The Thing (1982)
- Tootsie (1982)
- Tron (1982)
- The Verdict (1982)
- Victor/Victoria (1982)
- White Dog (1982)
- The World According to Garp (1982)
- The Big Chill (1983)
- Blue Thunder (1983)
- Breathless (1983)
- Flashdance (1983)
- Last Night at the Alamo (1983)
- Misunderstood (1983)
- Mr. Mom (1983)
- National Lampoon's Vacation (1983)
- The Outsiders (1983)
- The Pirates of Penzance (1983)
- Return of the Jedi (1983)
- The Right Stuff (1983)
- Rumble Fish (1983)
- Scarface (1983)
- Silkwood (1983)
- Star 80 (1983)
- Suburbia (1983)
- Tender Mercies (1983)
- Terms of Endearment (1983)
- Twilight Zone: The Movie (1983)
- Yentl (1983)

== Figures of the movement ==
=== Actors ===
- Brooke Adams
- Alan Alda
- Karen Allen
- Nancy Allen
- Woody Allen
- Susan Anspach
- Alan Arkin
- René Auberjonois
- Dan Aykroyd
- Joe Don Baker
- Anne Bancroft
- Angela Bassett
- Warren Beatty
- John Belushi
- Richard Benjamin
- Tom Berenger
- Karen Black
- Linda Blair
- Timothy Bottoms
- Marlon Brando
- Beau Bridges
- Jeff Bridges
- James Brolin
- Albert Brooks
- Mel Brooks
- Richard Burton
- Ellen Burstyn
- James Caan
- John Candy
- David Carradine
- Keith Carradine
- Diahann Carroll
- John Cassavetes
- Julie Christie
- Candy Clark
- Jill Clayburgh
- Glenn Close
- Sean Connery
- Bud Cort
- Robert Culp
- Tim Curry
- Jamie Lee Curtis
- Bruce Davison
- Ruby Dee
- Dom Deluise
- Brian Dennehy
- Sandy Dennis
- Robert De Niro
- Bruce Dern
- Danny DeVito
- Angie Dickinson
- Ivan Dixon
- Tamara Dobson
- Melvyn Douglas
- Michael Douglas
- Brad Dourif
- Richard Dreyfuss
- Faye Dunaway
- Charles Durning
- Robert Duvall
- Shelley Duvall
- Clint Eastwood
- Peter Falk
- Mia Farrow
- Sally Field
- Peter Finch
- Jane Fonda
- Peter Fonda
- Harrison Ford
- Frederic Forrest
- Jodie Foster
- Teri Garr
- Ben Gazzara
- Susan George
- Richard Gere
- Jeff Goldblum
- Louis Gossett Jr.
- Elliott Gould
- Lee Grant
- Charles Grodin
- Pam Grier
- Gene Hackman
- Mark Hamill
- Jessica Harper
- Goldie Hawn
- John Heard
- Buck Henry
- Barbara Hershey
- Dustin Hoffman
- William Holden
- Anthony Hopkins
- Dennis Hopper
- Ron Howard
- John Hurt
- Mary Beth Hurt
- William Hurt
- Amy Irving
- Glenda Jackson
- Olivia Newton John
- James Earl Jones
- Madeline Kahn
- Carol Kane
- Stacy Keach
- Diane Keaton
- Harvey Keitel
- Sally Kellerman
- Margot Kidder
- Robert Klein
- Shirley Knight
- Harvey Korman
- Kris Kristofferson
- Diane Ladd
- Burt Lancaster
- Jessica Lange
- Angela Lansbury
- Piper Laurie
- Cloris Leachman
- Bruce Lee
- Janet Leigh
- Jack Lemmon
- Kay Lenz
- Cleavon Little
- John Lithgow
- Gary Lockwood
- Ali MacGraw
- Steve Martin
- Lee Marvin
- Paul Le Mat
- Walter Matthau
- Michael McKean
- Malcolm McDowell
- Steve McQueen
- Liza Minnelli
- Vic Morrow
- Zero Mostel
- Eddie Murphy
- Tony Musante
- Patricia Neal
- Willie Nelson
- Paul Newman
- Jack Nicholson
- Ryan O'Neal
- Tatum O'Neal
- Al Pacino
- Melvin Van Peebles
- Dolly Parton
- Anthony Perkins
- Joe Pesci
- Bernadette Peters
- Mackenzie Phillips
- Sidney Poitier
- Michael J. Pollard
- Richard Pryor
- Randy Quaid
- Robert Redford
- Christopher Reeve
- Carl Reiner
- Lee Remick
- Burt Reynolds
- Diana Ross
- Richard Roundtree
- Gena Rowlands
- Kurt Russell
- Susan Sarandon
- Roy Scheider
- George C. Scott
- George Segal
- Peter Sellers
- Robert Shaw
- Martin Sheen
- Brooke Shields
- Sam Shepard
- Cybill Shepherd
- Talia Shire
- Charles Martin Smith
- Carrie Snodgress
- Sissy Spacek
- Sylvester Stallone
- Harry Dean Stanton
- Jack Starrett
- Rod Steiger
- Dean Stockwell
- Susan Strasberg
- Meryl Streep
- Barbra Streisand
- Donald Sutherland
- Loretta Swit
- Richard Thomas
- Lily Tomlin
- Rip Torn
- John Travolta
- Kathleen Turner
- Cicely Tyson
- Jon Voight
- Christopher Walken
- Jessica Walter
- Lesley Ann Warren
- Sam Waterston
- Sigourney Weaver
- Tuesday Weld
- Gene Wilder
- Billy Dee Williams
- Cindy Williams
- Paul Williams
- Paul Winfield
- Debra Winger
- James Woods

=== Directors ===
- Robert Aldrich
- Woody Allen
- Robert Altman
- Michael Apted
- Karen Arthur
- Hal Ashby
- Aram Avakian
- John G. Avildsen
- John Badham
- Ralph Bakshi
- Paul Bartel
- Saul Bass
- Robert Benton
- Bruce Beresford
- John Berry
- Peter Bogdanovich
- John Boorman
- James Bridges
- Albert Brooks
- Mel Brooks
- Richard Brooks
- Charles Burnett
- John Carpenter
- John Cassavetes
- Joyce Chopra
- Michael Cimino
- Shirley Clarke
- Larry Cohen
- Kathleen Collins
- Martha Coolidge
- Francis Ford Coppola
- Roger Corman
- Wes Craven
- Michael Crichton
- David Cronenberg
- Joe Dante
- Julie Dash
- Ossie Davis
- Jonathan Demme
- Brian De Palma
- Ivan Dixon
- Richard Donner
- Robert Downey Sr.
- Bill Duke
- Daryl Duke
- Clint Eastwood
- Blake Edwards
- Abel Ferrara
- Richard Fleischer
- Miloš Forman
- Bryan Forbes
- Bob Fosse
- Robert Frank
- John Frankenheimer
- James Frawley
- William Friedkin
- Samuel Fuller
- Sidney J. Furie
- Haile Gerima
- Terry Gilliam
- Milton Moses Ginsberg
- Robert Greenwald
- Ulu Grosbard
- Bill Gunn
- John D. Hancock
- Curtis Harrington

- Amy Heckerling
- Monte Hellman
- Buck Henry
- George Roy Hill
- Jack Hill
- Walter Hill
- Arthur Hiller
- Tobe Hooper
- Dennis Hopper
- Faith Hubley
- Peter Hyams
- Henry Jaglom
- Norman Jewison
- Jonathan Kaplan
- Lawrence Kasdan
- Philip Kaufman
- Irvin Kershner
- Randal Kleiser
- Barbara Kopple
- Ted Kotcheff
- Robert Kramer
- Stanley Kubrick
- John Landis
- Tom Laughlin
- Sergio Leone
- Richard Lester
- Barry Levinson
- Steven Lisberger
- Barbara Loden
- George Lucas
- Sidney Lumet
- David Lynch
- Adrian Lyne
- Nelson Lyon
- Norman Mailer
- Terrence Malick
- Louis Malle
- Michael Mann
- Richard Marquand
- Elaine May
- Paul Mazursky
- Jim McBride
- Jonas Mekas
- John Milius
- Robert Mulligan
- Floyd Mutrux
- Ronald Neame
- Hal Needham
- Ralph Nelson
- Mike Nichols
- Bill L. Norton
- Alan J. Pakula
- Alan Parker
- Gordon Parks
- Ivan Passer
- Sam Peckinpah
- Melvin Van Peebles
- Larry Peerce
- Arthur Penn
- Eagle Pennell
- Frank Perry
- Roman Polanski
- Sydney Pollack
- Abraham Polonsky
- Ted Post
- Bob Rafelson
- Robert Redford
- Julia Reichert
- Karel Reisz
- Michael Ritchie
- Martin Ritt
- Mark Robson
- Robert Rodriguez
- Nicolas Roeg
- Michael Roemer
- George A. Romero
- Stuart Rosenberg
- Herbert Ross
- Stephanie Rothman
- Alan Rudolph
- Richard Rush
- Mark Rydell
- Richard C. Sarafian
- John Sayles
- Franklin J. Schaffner
- Jerry Schatzberg
- John Schlesinger
- Paul Schrader
- Michael Schultz
- Martin Scorsese
- Ridley Scott
- Don Siegel
- Joan Micklin Silver
- Penelope Spheeris
- Steven Spielberg
- Sylvester Stallone
- Jack Starrett
- Oliver Stone
- Barbra Streisand
- Mel Stuart
- James Toback
- Douglas Trumbull
- Michael Wadleigh
- John Waters
- Peter Watkins
- Claudia Weill
- Wim Wenders
- Haskell Wexler
- Michael Winner
- Frederick Wiseman
- Fronza Woods
- Peter Yates
- Robert M. Young
- Robert Zemeckis
- Fred Zinnemann
- David Zucker, Jim Abrahams, & Jerry Zucker

=== Others ===
- Dede Allen
- Irwin Allen
- John Alcott
- Nestor Almendros
- John A. Alonzo
- Dario Argento
- Steven Bach
- Burt Bacharach
- Scott Bartlett
- Elaine & Saul Bass
- Elmer Bernstein
- Don Bluth
- Claude Bolling
- Chuck Braverman
- Ben Burtt
- Gerald Busby
- Bill Butler
- William Peter Blatty
- Wendy Carlos
- John Carpenter
- Allan Carr
- Michael Chapman
- Paddy Chayefsky
- Robert Chartoff
- Bill Conti
- Stewart Copeland
- Stanley Cortez
- Jordan Cronenweth
- Sally Cruikshank
- Hal David
- Dino De Laurentiis
- Caleb Deschanel
- Neil Diamond
- Pino Donaggio
- Nancy Dowd
- Tangerine Dream
- Bob Dylan
- Earth, Wind and Fire
- Roger Ebert
- Robert Evans
- Pablo Ferro
- Jules Feiffer
- David Fincher
- Pink Floyd
- William A. Fraker
- Tak Fujimoto
- Bob Gale
- The Bee Gees
- Bo Goldman
- William Goldman
- Anthony Goldschmidt
- Jerry Goldsmith
- Berry Gordy
- Michael Gore
- Conrad L. Hall
- Herbie Hancock
- Bo Harwood
- Issac Hayes
- Jim Henson
- Bernard Herrmann
- Debra Hill
- James Horner
- Alan Howarth
- James Wong Howe
- John Hughes
- Willard Huyck
- Quincy Jones
- Adrien Joyce
- Jerry Juhl
- Pauline Kael
- Jeff Kanew
- Michael Kaplan
- Gloria Katz
- Boris Kaufman
- John Korty
- László Kovács
- Bill Kroyer
- Alan Ladd Jr.
- Ring Lardner Jr.
- Michel Legrand
- Ernest Lehman
- Boris Leven
- Marcia Lucas
- David Lynch
- Barry Malkin
- David Mamet
- Johnny Mandel
- Melissa Mathison
- Curtis Mayfield
- Larry McMurtry
- The Monkees
- Giorgio Moroder
- Ennio Morricone
- John Morris
- Walter Murch
- Hal Needham
- David Newman
- Randy Newman
- Harry Nilsson
- Jack Nitzsche
- Sven Nykvist
- Dan O'Bannon
- Van Dyke Parks
- Dan Perri
- Eleanor Perry
- Michael & Julia Phillips
- Polly Platt
- Harold Ramis
- The Ramones
- Nicolas Roeg
- Owen Roizman
- Fred Roos
- Leonard Rosenman
- Nino Rota
- Albert S. Ruddy
- Waldo Salt
- Andrew Sarris
- John Sayles
- Lalo Schifrin
- Bert Schneider
- Thelma Schoonmaker
- Rod Serling
- David Shire
- Ronald Shusett
- Stirling Silliphant
- Alan Silvestri
- Simon & Garfunkel
- Don Simpson
- Gene Siskel
- Terry Southern
- Spirit
- Ray Stark
- Dawn Steel
- Cat Stevens
- Robert Stigwood
- Oliver Stone
- Vittorio Storaro
- Drew Struzan
- Robert Surtees
- Robert Swarthe
- Robert Towne
- Donald Trumbull
- Vangelis
- The Village People
- Tom Waits
- Haskell Wexler
- John Williams
- Paul Williams
- Gordon Willis
- John David Wilson
- Irwin Winkler
- David L. Wolper
- Frank Yablans
- Danny Zeitlin
- Robert Zemeckis
- Vilmos Zsigmond

=== Notable studios associated with New Hollywood ===
- 20th Century Fox
- American International Pictures
- American Zoetrope
- BBS Productions
- Cannon Films
- Cinema Center Films
- Columbia Pictures
- Embassy Pictures
- Filmways Pictures
- Hemdale Film Corporation
- MGM
- New Line Cinema
- New World Pictures
- Orion Pictures
- Paramount Pictures
- United Artists
- Universal Pictures
- Walt Disney Productions
- Warner Bros.
