= Milestones (1975 film) =

- Directed by: Robert Kramer; John Douglas
- Written by: Robert Kramer
- Produced by: Barbara Stone; David Stone
- Starring: Mary Chapelle; Sharon Krebs; Jim Nolfi; Grace Paley; Susie Solf; David C. Stone; Joe Stork; Paul Zimet
- Cinematography: Robert Kramer; John Douglas
- Edited by: Robert Kramer; John Douglas
- Release date: 1975
- Running time: 3 hours 18 minutes
- Country: United States
- Language: English
- Budget: $50,000

Milestones is a 1975 American drama film directed by Robert Kramer and John Douglas.

== Plot ==
"A many-faceted portrait of those individuals who sought radical solutions to social problems in the United States during the 1960s and 1970s. It cuts back and forth between six major story lines and more than fifty characters, and across a vast landscape, to explore the lifestyles and attitudes of the American left who faced both personal and historical transitions in the period following the Vietnam War." said Laurence Kardish, curator at the Museum of Modern Art, New York.

== Production ==
The film was co-directed by John Douglas, a member of the agitprop documentary film group The Newsreel whom Kramer prematurely departed and were against distributing one of his previous films Ice (1970), who also played one of the characters: a blind potter.

An introduction written both Kramer and Douglas before the film's premiere at the 1975 Cannes Film Festival presented the film as:

“a vision of America in the Seventies and […] a journey into the past and the future. It is a film with many characters. People who are conscious of a heritage founded on the genocide of the Indians and the slavery of the Black Man. A nation of people—trying to correct the errors of the present—the attempted genocide of the Vietnamese people. Milestones is a complex Proustian mosaic of characters and landscape which weave together to form the fabric of the film. There are many scenes in many cities, faces and voices without endings but many beginnings. The film crosses America from the snow-covered mountains of Vermont, to the waterfalls of Utah, to the caves of the Hopi Indians, and the dirt and grime and energy of New York City. Milestones is a film about rebirth, of ideas and faces, of images and sounds.”

== Cast ==
- Mary Chapelle - Mama
- Sharon Krebs - Jane
- Jim Nolfi - Jimmy
- Grace Paley - Helen
- Susie Solf - Karen
- David C. Stone - Joe
- Joe Stork - Larry
- Paul Zimet - Peter

== See also ==
- List of American films of 1975
- Counterculture of the 1960s
- New Hollywood
