= A Hell of a Note =

1977 short film by Eagle Pennell

- Film poster
- Directed by: Eagle Pennell
- Written by: Eagle Pennell
- Produced by: Eagle Pennell
- Starring: Lou Perryman; Sonny Carl Davis
- Music by: Chuck Pinnell
- Production company: Eagle Pictures
- Distributed by: Watchmaker Films (DVD)
- Release date: January 26, 1977 (Austin, Texas)
- Running time: 28 minutes
- Country: United States
- Language: English

A Hell of a Note is a 1977 independent short film directed, written, and produced by Eagle Pennell. It stars Lou Perryman and Sonny Carl Davis.

== Plot summary ==
Two friends get fired from their roofer jobs and head to the Soap Creek Saloon together to drown their sorrows in beer. They carouse into the night, culminating in a tragedy.

== Cast ==
- Lou Perryman as Floyd Johnson
- Sonny Carl Davis as Jimmie Lee

== Release ==
It was released on January 26, 1977, in the same city where it shot on location—Austin, Texas.

== Reception ==
William Michael Boyle, writing for Southwest Review, praised the short for doing "a great job of deconstructing a certain breed of American masculinity".
