= Norman Fruchter =

American writer, filmmaker, and academic (1937–2023)

- Born: August 11, 1937; Philadelphia, Pennsylvania, U.S.
- Died: January 4, 2023 (aged 85); Brooklyn, New York, U.S.

Academic background
- Education: Rutgers University (BA)

Norman Fruchter (August 11, 1937 – January 4, 2023) was an American writer, filmmaker, and academic.

== Life and career ==
Fruchter was born in Philadelphia, Pennsylvania, on August 11, 1937. He graduated from Rutgers University, in 1959, where he edited the literary magazine, Anthologist.

Fruchter was arrested protesting with CORE and James Farmer, Bayard Rustin, Rev. Donald Harrington, and Michael Harrington, at the 1964 New York World's Fair. From 1960 to 1962, he served as assistant to the editor of New Left Review. He was an editor at Studies on the Left, (1959–1967).

=== Newsreel ===
Prior to becoming a member of Newsreel which was founded in 1967, Fruchter and Robert Machover made 'Troublemakers', an award-winning documentary about an organizing effort by members of Students for a Democratic Society (SDS) in the Black wards of Newark, New Jersey. As part of their mission to instigate social change, members of Newsreel would present films to political organizations and community groups across the United States. The retrospective, Exit Art / The First World had Newsreel members Norman Fruchter, Roz Payne and Lynn Phillips discuss the films. He was a member of SDS along with Tom Hayden, Jesse Allen, Robert Kramer, also full-time organizers for the group: Carol Glassman; Terry Jefferson; Constance Brown; Corinna Fales; and Derek Winans. He was investigated by the House Un-American Activities Committee. He co-founded and co-directed Independence High School, an alternative high school for drop-outs in Newark, New Jersey, throughout most of the 1970s.

Fruchter recommended Christine Choy to the Newsreel group, after meeting her at Ironbound neighborhood in Newark, New Jersey.

=== Education ===
Fruchter was a member of School Board 15, in Brooklyn from 1983 to 1994. He helped to form Campaign for Fiscal Equity, which sued the city of New York over inadequate school funding. He co-founded and headed the Institute for Education and Social Policy at New York University from 1987 to 1996.

=== Personal life and death ===
Fruchter married Rachel G. Fruchter (died 1997), who was member of the Department of Obstetrics and Gynecology State University of New York for nearly 25 years. After her untimely death he married Heather Lewis, a former Newsreel member and school board colleague. Fruchter had two children and four grandchildren.

Fruchter died on January 4, 2023, at the age of 85, from injuries sustained in a traffic collision on December 22.

== Awards ==
Fruchter won the first Edward Lewis Wallant Award. His documentary, "Troublemakers" was selected for premiere screening at the New York Film Festival and subsequently featured at film festivals around the world.

== Works ==
=== Novels ===
- Coat Upon a Stick. New York, NY: Simon & Schuster. 1962. ASIN B000O3Q0HU.
- Single File. New York, NY: Alfred A. Knopf. 1970.

=== Academic papers ===
- "Restructuring and Multiculturalism: A New Alliance To Shift the Power Balance?". Celebrating Diverse Voices: Progressive Education and Equity. Thought and Practice Series. Corwin Press. 1993. ISBN 0-8039-6039-5.
- John Mollenkopf; Ken Emerson, eds. (2001). Rethinking the Urban Agenda. Century Foundation. p. 248. ISBN 0-87078-465-X.

=== Commentary ===
- Fruchter, Norman (May–June 1961). "Jews and others". New Left Review. I (9). New Left Review.
- Fruchter, Norman (March–April 1961). "Where is the ginger man?". New Left Review. I (8). New Left Review.

Profile of The Ginger Man's author J. P. Donleavy.

- Fruchter, Norman (March–April 1960). "The Savage Eye". New Left Review. I (2). New Left Review.

Review of the film The Savage Eye.

- Fruchter, Norman (February 1972). "SDS: In and Out of Context". Liberation. David Dellinger and A. J. Muste.

Cited in: Breines, Wini (1989), "Politics as community: participatory democracy", in Breines, Wini (ed.), Community and organization in the New Left, 1962-1968: the great refusal, New Brunswick, New Jersey: Rutgers University Press, pp. 61–62, ISBN 9780813514031. Preview.

- Fruchter, Norman (May 1971). "Movement Propaganda and the Culture of the Spectacle". Liberation. David Dellinger and A. J. Muste: 4–17.

Cited in: Lazere, Donald (1987), "Introduction: entertainment as social control", in Lazere, Donald (ed.), American media and mass culture: left perspectives, Berkeley, California: University of California Press, p. 9, ISBN 9780520044968. Preview.

=== Filmography ===
- Race Against Prime Time - ( Narrator(- Narration) / 1984 / Released / Albany Video )
- The People's War - ( Director / 1970 / Released / )
- WE GOT TO LIVE HERE, Robert Machover & Norman Fruchter, (1965, 16mm B&W/sound, 20 min.)
- Troublemakers, Robert Machover & Norman Fruchter, (1966, 16mm B&W/sound, 54 min.)
- FALN (1965), Peter Gessner, Norman Fruchter and Robert Machover, Robert Kramer
- Summer '68 (1969)
