= The Man Who Envied Women =

- Directed by: Yvonne Rainer
- Release date: August 1985
- Running time: 125 min.
- Country: United States

The Man Who Envied Women is a 1985 American film directed by Yvonne Rainer. It stars Jackie Raynal, Anne Friedberg and Larry Loonin in the lead roles.

== Cast ==
- Jackie Raynal
- Anne Friedberg
- Larry Loonin
- Fronza Woods
