= Southwest Alternate Media Project =

- Founded: 1977
- Location: Houston, Texas
- Website: swamp.org

The Southwest Alternate Media Project (SWAMP) is a non profit media arts organization based in Houston, Texas. It was established in 1977.

The Southwest Alternate Media Project was a co-sponsor of Houston Film Critics Society Awards 2010 and has provided production support for several notable feature films, including Last Night at the Alamo. SWAMP also recognized and supported the work of now noted filmmakers Richard Linklater, Robert Rodriguez, and Jane Campion. SWAMP was recognized and thanked for its assistance in the credits of three movies, Interface (1985) directed by Andy Anderson, Slacker (1991) directed by Richard Linklater, and Hannah and the Dog Ghost (1981) directed by Ken Harrison.
