= California Newsreel =

Film distribution and production company

- Abbreviation: California Newsreels
- Nickname: The CNR
- Named after: California
- Founded: 1968
- Established: 1968
- Founder: Government of San Francisco
- Founded at: San Francisco, CA
- Type: Nonprofit corporation; PBS-affiliated corporation
- Location: San Francisco, CA, United States
- Region served: San Francisco County
- Products: Documentary and educational feature films
- Owner: KCET
- Parent organization: PBS

California Newsreel is an American non-profit, social justice film distribution and production organization based in San Francisco, California. It was founded in 1968 as the San Francisco branch of the national filmmaking collective Newsreel. Their educational media resources include both documentary and feature films, with a focus on the advancement of racial justice and diversity, and the study of African American life and history, as well as African culture and politics. In 2006, Newsreel launched a new thematic focus for their work: Globalization, with an emphasis on the global economy and the international division of labour. Several of California Newsreels' films have been broadcast on PBS.

California Newsreel has produced a small number of films related to racial and economic justice, including Race: The Power of an Illusion (2003), and UNNATURAL CAUSES: Is Inequality Making Us Sick? (2008) A new video series The Raising of America: Early Childhood and the Future of Our Nation is scheduled for release in 2015.

== Film and video collections ==
The Library of African Cinema: Films from Africa made by Africans, offering restorative images and a new film language. Several of the newest releases touch upon issues such as war, human rights and the AIDS pandemic.

African American Perspectives: The video resources in this collection provide historical, cultural, political and sociological chronicles about the people and events that have shaped America from slavery to the present day. This collection aims to provide a context for understanding current issues of race and prejudice.

Globalisation: These films examine the impact of neo-liberal economic policies on labour, trade, health, culture and the environment. Their globalisation videos are intended to serve as analytical educational tools, offering alternative views to mainstream coverage of global economic issues.

Health and Social Justice: Starting with the Cornerstone Release of UNNATURAL CAUSES: Is Inequality Making Us Sick? (2008) which attempts to frame the conversation around social determinants of health, this video collection looks at the ways socioeconomic and racial inequities affect health outcomes in the United States and abroad.

== See also ==
- Third World Newsreel
- The Newsreel
