= Race: The Power of an Illusion =

- Directed by: Christine Herbes-Sommers, Tracy Heather Strain, Llewellyn Smith
- Produced by: Larry Adelman for California Newsreel
- Distributed by: California Newsreel
- Release date: April 2003
- Country: United States
- Language: English

Race: The Power of an Illusion is a three-part documentary series produced by California Newsreel that investigates the idea of race in society, science and history. The educational documentary originally screened on American public television and was primarily funded by the Corporation for Public Broadcasting, the Ford Foundation and PBS.

== Series overview ==
This three-hour documentary challenges the idea of race as biology and traces our current notions to the 19th century. It also demonstrates how race nevertheless has a continuing impact through institutions and social policies.

== Chapters ==
- Chapter One - The Difference Between Us

Examines the contemporary science - including genetics - that challenges our common-sense assumptions that human beings can be bundled into three or four fundamentally different groups according to their physical traits.

- Chapter Two - The Story We Tell

Uncovers the roots of the race concept in North America, the 19th-century science that legitimated it, and how it came to be held so fiercely in the Western imagination. The episode is an eye-opening tale of how race served to rationalize, even justify, American social inequalities as "natural."

- Chapter Three - The House We Live In

Asks, if race is not biology, what is it? This episode uncovers how race resides not in nature but in politics, economics and culture. It reveals how our social institutions "make" race by disproportionately channeling resources, power, status and wealth to white people.

== Bibliography ==
- Clarke, Camille A. (Spring 2004). "Race: The Power of Illusion; Examining the Myth of Race". The Journal of Blacks in Higher Education (43): 134. ProQuest 195536576.
- Moradi, Erfan (2020-09-14). "Race, the power of an illusion". Berkeley News.

== See also ==
- Museum exhibit and website created by the American Anthropological Association
