= Third World Newsreel =

American media center and film distribution company

- Formerly: Newsreel
- Founded: 1967
- Headquarters: New York City, United States
- Website: www.twn.org/default.aspx

Third World Newsreel (formerly known as Newsreel) is an American media center and film distribution company based in New York City.

== History ==
Newsreel, the forerunner of Third World Newsreel, was established in 1967 as a collective. "In 1973, a caucus of African American, Latino and Asian members met to evaluate Newsreel's commitment to issues that concerned their communities. New York Newsreel was swiftly redirected to represent international communities of color and was renamed Third World Newsreel. Early works by TWN included Teach Our Children, In The Event Anyone Disappears and From Spikes to Spindles."

"The organization holds regular screenings at the Anthology Film Archives, and other NYC venues, as well as retrospective programs at film festivals internationally, while now distributing over 400 film and video titles."

== See also ==
- California Newsreel
- The Newsreel
