= Roz Payne =

American cinematographer and political activist (1940-2019)

- Born: Roslyn Berkman Cristiano; October 25, 1940; Paterson, New Jersey, US
- Died: May 21, 2019 (aged 78); Richmond, Vermont, US
- Education: University of California, Los Angeles (BA); City College of New York (MA)
- Organizations: The Newsreel; W.I.T.C.H.
- Spouse: Arnold Payne (m. 1962; div. 1967) Serge Ernandez (divorced)
- Children: 2

Roz Payne (born Roslyn Berkman Cristiano; October 25, 1940 – May 21, 2019) was an American political activist, director and cinematographer.

== Biography ==
Roslyn Berkman Cristiano was born October 25, 1940 in Paterson, New Jersey to James "Jimmy" Cristiano, an Italian immigrant, and Edith Berkman, a Jewish immigrant from Poland. She was raised in a working class household by her parents who were both lifelong socialists and anti-racist activists. Her mother Edith was an organizer for the textile union in Lawrence, Massachusetts during the Great Depression, and was imprisoned and threatened with deportation for her radical activity. Her father James ran as a Socialist Party candidate for the New Jersey Senate. In the 1980s Roz visited the Soviet Union with her father, and they were seated in first class on a flight between Tbilisi and Moscow, which outraged her father who asserted that there ought to be no classes in the Soviet Union. Her parents were friends with Allen Ginsberg, who lived nearby and was sometimes Roz's babysitter. At the age of 13, Roz's mother took her to a memorial service for Emmett Till in Los Angeles. While attending grammar school in Los Angeles, Roz had a Japanese friend, Linda Fukuyama, who had been interned during World War 2.

Her family later moved to Hollywood, California where she attended UCLA. In 1962 she married her high school boyfriend Arnold Payne, a bodybuilder she described to as "Mr. Muscle Beach Jr.", and the couple moved back east before separating in 1967. She completed her masters degree at City College New York and began teaching at an elementary school in New Jersey. Payne was appalled by images of US soldiers attacking villages during the then-ongoing Vietnam War, pushing her to become more involved in political activism. On one occasion as a teacher, her students created a mural which included a newspaper article showing the US bombing of a Vietnamese village, prompting the principal to question the students about its content in Payne's absence, with the students insisting that it showed the aftermath of a Viet Cong attack so as not to get Payne into trouble. She later said that her students referred to her as "Mrs. Pain in the Ass". Payne's conflict with the educational establishment continued, and after being sent home by the principal for wearing a miniskirt deemed to be too short, Payne decided to quit teaching to become a filmmaker and political activist.

=== The Newsreel ===
In 1967, Payne and other independent filmmakers formed "The Newsreel", a collective of filmmakers and photographers in New York City dedicated to making politically relevant media "that would show another side to the news". Payne described the purpose of Newsreel's films as an attempt to "analyze, not just cover" the news, and that these films would act as "weapons" which would "serve as part of the catalyst for revolutionary social change".

Roz Payne's extensive documentation of the 1960s has provided a significant source of archival film material of groups like the Black Panthers, which has been used in documentary films like Chicago 10 (2007). Much of her work is now digitized and available via the Roz Payne Sixties Archive, a project run by historian Patrick Jones of the University of Nebraska–Lincoln.

=== Political activism ===
In the 1960s Payne was involved in the Venceremos Brigade which organized trips to Cuba in solidarity with Cubans against the United States embargo against Cuba. In 1967, Payne participated in the March on the Pentagon. During the Columbia University student protests, in which university buildings were occupied by members of the Students for a Democratic Society (SDS), Payne and other Newsreel members filmed inside the occupied buildings and participated in negotiations. In September 1968, Payne filmed and participated in the Miss America protest alongside fellow photographer Bev Grant.

In 1972, Payne and other members of the Newsreel collective relocated to Vermont and established the Red Clover commune in Putney, which she described as a "political collective", referring to herself as a "politico". Red Clover would become one of the founding communes in Free Vermont, a network of anti-capitalist communes throughout the Green Mountains. In the same year, she was also involved in the establishment of the Vermont Women's Health Center (VWHC), which was intended to provide abortions and other reproductive health services. Opposition to the health center was anticipated, and so ahead of the planned opening on Monday morning, Roz became the first patient treated with a blood test on Sunday evening, as it was believed that it would be harder to close down the health center if it had already begun providing health services. Later, after moving to Burlington, she co-founded the Green Mountain Red commune which was also affiliated with the Free Vermont network. She also assisted in setting up the Onion River Co-op, which eventually became Burlington's city market. She eventually settled in Richmond, Vermont, where she helped establish the People's Free Clinic.

Payne was also friends with leaders of the Weather Underground and members of the Yippies.

In 1981, Payne began working as a legal investigator and law clerk in the office of Burlington attorney Sandy Baird, and completed the Vermont Law Clerk Program between 1985 and 1989. During her time with Sandy Baird she helped compile archives which chronicled the FBI's counterintelligence activities against Black and radical movements. Payne also helped Bernie Sanders get elected as mayor of Burlington in 1981.

In 1989 Payne was elected Constable in Richmond, Vermont after being entered onto the ballot by friends as a joke. She was subsequently sent to Vermont Police Academy in Pittsford, and spent most of her time as constable researching and archiving material on the Black Panther Party.

=== Involvement with the Black Panthers ===
Black Panther member Zayd Shakur asked Payne to show Newsreel films at their Harlem branch to young Black Panther members and recruits as part of their political education by the party. These films would typically cover topics like the Vietnam War or the Black Panthers themselves. Zayd Shakur would later be involved in a police shootout alongside Assata Shakur, in which he was killed.

Payne took thousands of photographs of Black Panther activities, including the "Free Huey!" campaign during Huey P. Newton's murder trial, during which he was convicted but which was later overturned. Payne also covered the protests surrounding the Panther 21 trial, during which a group of Black Panther Party members were accused of planning bomb and rifle attacks on police. Afeni Shakur, who at the time was pregnant with future rapper Tupac Shakur, was the only defendant permitted bail and was visited by Payne in her hotel room near the court.

On April 2, 1969, Payne and another member of the Newsreel collective accompanied Curtis Powell, a member of the Panther 21 group accused and later acquitted of planning attacks on police, to his apartment in preparation for handing himself over to the NYPD. Powell had requested the presence of the two white Newsreel members out of fear that he might be shot by police and then retroactively accused of having resisted arrest, as had happened to Bobby Hutton the previous year. Payne and her Newsreel colleague entered the apartment with Powell with cameras drawn, and were greeted by police armed with rifles taking cover behind furniture. Payne testified in court on behalf of Powell during the Panther 21 trial.

In 1980 the FBI and NYPD were ordered to produce files relating to Dhoruba bin Wahad, a Black Panther who had been convicted for the attempted murder of two NYPD officers. The fully unredacted documents were released in 1987 and eventually resulted in Wahad's release from prison after 19 years. The documents also revealed to Payne the extent that the FBI's counterintelligence programme known as COINTELPRO had targeted many of the Black Panthers that she knew personally. Payne would later become pen pals with a former FBI agent, William A. Cohendet, whose FBI documents had been compiled by Payne. Payne was able to retrieve his address and phone number from some of the released FBI documents, and after multiple years of correspondence they agreed to meet for dinner at a hotel. The next year, Cohendet invited Payne to his home in Burlingame, California to interview him on his 80th birthday, where Payne pressed him on is involvement in COINTELPRO.

=== Later life ===
Payne later joined the faculty of Burlington College where she taught the history of the 60s, the civil rights movement, women, and Mycology.

Roz Payne later married Serge Ernandez, with whom she had a daughter named Sierra in 1977.

Roz Payne died on May 21, 2019 at the age of 78. She was survived by her daughter Sierra and her granddaughter Del.
