= À toute allure =

1982 film

- Film poster
- Starring: William Cherino
- Release date: May 1982
- Running time: 61 minutes
- Country: France
- Language: French

À toute allure (lit. 'Full Speed') is a 1982 French drama film directed by Robert Kramer. It was entered into the 1982 Cannes Film Festival.

== Cast ==
- Laure Duthilleul - Nelly
- William Cherino - Serge
- Bernard Ballet - Felix
- Manuelle Lidsky - Manu
- Pierre Hurel - The child
- Natacha Jeanneau - The mother
- André S. Labarthe - Himself, narrator (cold open)
- Robert Kramer - Himself (cold open)
