= Lou Perryman =

American actor (1941–2009)

- Born: Louis Byron Perryman; August 15, 1941; Cooke County, Texas, U.S.
- Died: April 1, 2009 (aged 67); Austin, Texas, U.S.
- Other name: Lou Perry
- Occupation: Actor
- Years active: 1977–2003

Louis Byron Perryman (August 15, 1941 – April 1, 2009), also known as Lou Perry, was an American character actor. He acted in a number of small roles both on television and in films such as The Blues Brothers, Poltergeist, Boys Don't Cry and The Texas Chainsaw Massacre 2.

He was a film crew member on the original Texas Chainsaw Massacre film. In the sequel Texas Chainsaw Massacre 2, he portrayed L.G., the radio station manager.

Perryman also starred in Texas independent filmmaker Eagle Pennell's The Whole Shootin' Match and Last Night at the Alamo.

== Death ==
Perryman was killed in his home in Austin, Texas, on April 1, 2009, by a 26-year-old man named Seth Christopher Tatum. Tatum, who had recently been released from prison for aggravated robbery, had gone off his medications and had been drinking. He later confessed that he had killed Perryman with an axe. On June 26, 2009 Tatum was indicted on two counts of capital murder. Tatum pleaded guilty to murder and was convicted on February 1, 2011. He was sentenced to life in prison.

== Filmography ==
Year	Title	Role	Notes
1978	The Whole Shootin' Match	Loyd	
1980	The Blues Brothers	Man at Bar	
1980	Fast Money	Buddy	
1982	Poltergeist	Pugsley	
1983	Last Night at the Alamo	Claude Grimes	
1986	The Texas Chainsaw Massacre 2	L.G. McPeters	
1986	Trespasses	Arnold	
1989	The Cellar	Kyle Boatwright	
1997	Deep in the Heart		
1998	City Hunter: The Motion Picture	Falcon	English version, Voice
1999	City Hunter: .357 Magnum	Falcon	English version, Voice
1999	Boys Don't Cry	Sheriff	
1999	Natural Selection	Pappy	
1999	City Hunter: Bay City Wars	Falcon	English version, Voice
2000	City Hunter: Million Dollar Conspiracy	Falcon	English version, Voice
2003	When Zachary Beaver Came to Town	Ferris	(final film role)
