= Paul Williams (composer) =

English composer and record producer

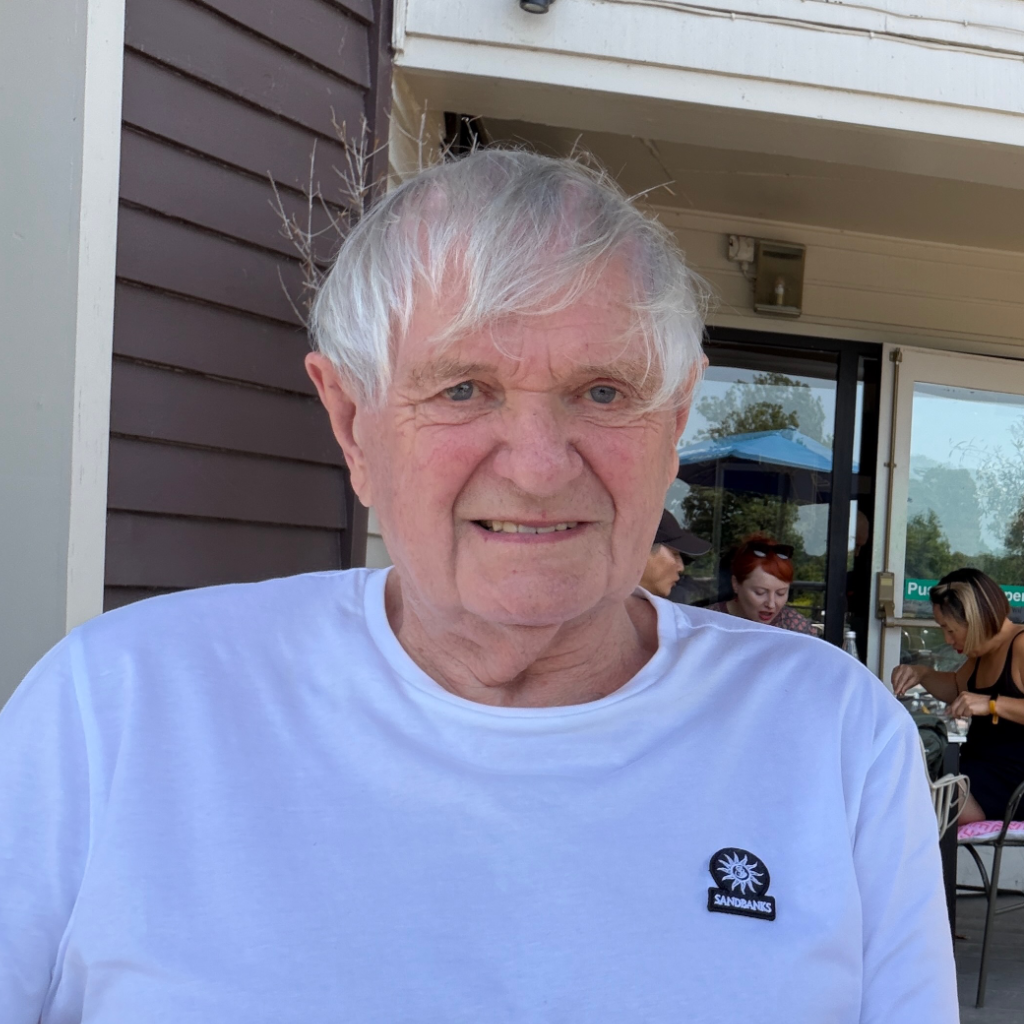
Paul Williams, English composer

David Paul Gifford Williams is an English composer, songwriter and record producer. He has worked at BBC Radio 1 and Radio 2 as producer for recordings by Led Zeppelin, David Bowie and The Who. Williams is known for his piano playing on production music recordings and composes songs and instrumentals for international publishing companies. His compositions include adventure music, romantic songs, ambient tracks, and high-tech soundscapes.

Williams lives in Cheam, Surrey.

== Early life ==
Williams was born in Kingston upon Thames. He started composing at the age of eight. He studied music and composition at the Tiffin School in Kingston upon Thames and the Royal College of Music, where, at the age of 12, Williams was accorded the distinction of a Saturday morning exhibition for talent.

Williams career in the music industry began during his undergraduate years at the Royal College of Music, when he worked during the summer months as a pianist on the RMS Queen Elizabeth. During one cruise he met his future wife Rosalind with whom he has three children, Samantha, Susannah and Simon.

He went on to study at Jesus College, Cambridge, under musicologist Thurston Dart. While pursuing his studies Williams worked with young musicians and media personalities to create his first professional song writing and production projects.

== Early career ==
At Jesus College, Cambridge, Williams collaborated with Roger Wornell, under the pen names Paul de Schroeder and Lee Lenrow, promoting The Phantoms, a local rock and roll group, writing songs including their first singles Phantom Guitar and Cachina. These were recorded by Ken Levy and the Phantoms at Landsdowne Studios in London in 1960, originally as a demo, and later released on Palette Records in 1961. Phantom Guitar and Cachina are now recognised as classic British interpretations of the Telstar-style music.

Williams also met the legendary track and field athlete Herb Elliott at Jesus College. Along with his friend Richard Brown, Williams teamed up with Elliott to produce Running Shoes/ b-side Reggae Jazz Band Ball in aid of the Remembrance Day charity. A forgotten classic, Running Shoes was released by Decca in 1964 and is now a collectors item.

Another encounter at Cambridge was with Dean Parker, a young singer with whom Paul Williams and Richard Brown recorded Blue Eyes and Golden Hair for the Earl Haig Poppy Day Fund.

Later, as a postgraduate at Cambridge, Williams met David Frost who invited Williams to join the Cambridge Footlights on the basis of Williams talent as a pianist and musician.

== BBC Sessions 1969-1997 ==
At the BBC Williams worked with broadcasters Tony Blackburn, the late Johnnie Walker and the late Jimmy Young.

=== Led Zeppelin ===
Williams produced four tracks for Session 3 of Led Zeppelins 1969 BBC Sessions, broadcast on Chris Grants Tasty Pop Sunday show on Sunday 22 June 1969. The album was released by Atlantic Records on 11 November 1997. Paul produced:

- The Girl I Love She Got Black Wavy Hair
- Communication Breakdown
- Somethin Else
- What is and Should Never Be

=== The Who ===
The Who's 1997 BBC Sessions was recorded live at the BBC studios in London. The compilation was released 15 February 2000. Paul produced four tracks:

- Substitute
- The Seeker
- Im Free
- Shakin All Over / Spoonful

These tracks were recorded 13 April 1970, at IBC Studios, London, and broadcast on the Dave Lee Travis show, 19 April 1970.

=== David Bowie ===
Bowies Bowie at the Beeb is a compilation album released in 2000. Paul produced two tracks:

- Let Me Sleep Beside You
- Janine

These tracks were recorded for the Dave Lee Travis Show as David Bowie and Juniors Eyes, broadcast 20 October 1969.

=== With John Lennon and Yoko Ono at The Hit Factory, New York ===
The Hit Factory was a recording studio in New York City famous for its clientele. Andy Peebles interviewed John Lennon and Yoko Ono at The Hit Factory for BBC Radio 1 on 6 December 1980.

Paul Williams produced the interview, which was Lennon's final recorded interview before his death on 8 December 1980.

=== Radio 1 Charity Discos ===
From 1985 to 1992 Williams worked as director and live discos producer for the Variety Club of Great Britain, raising £700,000 to support disabled and disadvantaged children.

== Roxy Music spinoff ==
As a member of the band Nowomowa, Williams composed and recorded with Phil Manzanera of Roxy Music on the seminal album The Wasted Lands, playing Acoustic Piano, Kurzweil 250 and Kawai MIDI Master Keyboard M 800.

== Publishing ==
Williams composes for major international publishing libraries, including Warner-Chappell Music (writing as Terry Day), Sound Stage, BMG Production Music (formerly Parry Music), Universal Production Music, and Soho Production Music, Carlin Music Recording Library (Song Book Treasures), CPM, Squirky Music, Vibrant Music, and Audio Wallpaper, with over 1300 titles published. His compositions range from dramatic scene-setting scores, to romantic ballads and love songs, and more recently high-tech underscores.

=== Music for film and television ===
Williams' music is featured in Hollywood movies including Deep Impact, Crocodile Dundee and Wedding Date.

Paul's TV credits include successful series Mom, Bull, Glee, and Hawaiian tracks for the American animated series SpongeBob SquarePants.

  - Crocodile Dundee (1986) "Crocodile" Dundee (1986) Samanthas theme
  - Neighbours (Grundy TV Australia), incidental music underscores
  - Incir Reçeli 2 (Major film) That Summertime, feature song
  - Sponge Bob Square Pants, Snowball Effect episode
  - SpongeBob Squarepants Hawaiian theme
  - Father of Invention Wonderful Christmas Time
  - Very Harald and Kumar 3d Wonderful Christmas Time
  - Rainmaker Chique Image
  - Message in a Bottle Song Without End (sung by Demis Roussos)
  - Everybody Wins (Karel Reisz), incidental music
  - A Country Practice (Australian TV), incidental music
  - House of Gristle (BBC 1 TV Series), theme and incidental music
  - Out of this World (1997 BBC 1 TV Documentary with Carol Vorderman), Mysteries, main theme and incidental music
  - Madmen (Netflix) Heavenly Girl, string orchestra arrangement published by Warner Chappell
  - Deep Impact (Spielberg/Dreamworks 1998) Grosvenor House (incidental music).
  - My Good Friend (Hartswood Films) Incidental music
  - Oprah Winfrey Show, Incidental piano music
  - Wedding Date (Film 2005) Incidental music
  - Victorian and Edwardian Drama (Universal Music 2005) Incidental film music

=== Advertising ===
Williams' compositions in advertising and commercials include Doritos Crisps (Fuego de passion, Soho Production Music, 2016), Dalani Home Living (Flipper Music), and Lil Pepsi Have Some Fun This Halloween. Additional credits include advertisements for:

  - Hewlett-Packard
  - ICI
  - Lunn Poly
  - Pan Am Airlines
  - Sephora Holidays Packaging
  - Sony
  - SonyEricsson
  - Suchard
  - Tetley Tea
  - TSB
  - Uncle Ben's Rice

=== Jazzy love songs ===
A selection of songs by Paul Williams published by CPM (formerly Carlin Music Recording Library).

  - That Summertime When We Were Young, sung by Tina May
  - Starlight Club, sung by Tina May
  - My Valentine, sung by Lance Ellington
  - Love Dance, jazz combo in wonderland, sung by Tina May
  - Cest Ma Chanson d'Amour, classic French love song sung by Joan Viskant
  - Lets Fly Away, sung by Frank Holder
  - Beautiful World, sung by Frank Holder
  - Cool Cat, sung by Frank Holder
  - London We Love You, sung by Peter Dinsley
  - Starlight Club, sung by Tina May and Peter Dinsley

== Awards ==
  - Library Music Award 2014: Best Track for Black Treacle, writing as Jason Mason, co-written with Chris Bemand
  - Buma/Stemra award for best Library Music, April 1994
