= The Whole Shootin' Match =

- Directed by: Eagle Pennell
- Written by: Eagle Pennell; Lin Sutherland
- Produced by: Lin Sutherland
- Starring: Lou Perryman; Sonny Carl Davis; Doris Hargrave
- Music by: Chuck Pinnell
- Distributed by: New Line Cinema
- Release date: March 19, 1978
- Running time: 109 min
- Country: United States
- Language: English

The Whole Shootin' Match is a 1978 American independent film directed and co-written by Eagle Pennell, and starring Sonny Carl Davis, Lou Perryman, and Doris Hargrave. The black-and-white film was originally shot in 16 mm. The film was restored and distributed on DVD by Watchmaker Films in 2006.

== Plot ==
Frank (Davis) and Loyd (Perryman) spend most of their time drinking, flirting with women (even though Frank is married to Paulette), and thinking of get-rich-quick schemes since they can't seem to hold down jobs. They tried frog farming and squirrel ranching, among other things, and now are in a failing roofing business. Finally, Loyd invents a gadget he calls the "Kitchen Wizard", and they each make a thousand dollars selling the rights to a patent attorney who gives them a contract worth much more. However, their idea is stolen and they soon run out of money. Frank contemplates suicide, but Loyd talks him out of it by reminding him of his family and their friendship.

== Production ==
Sutherland and Pennell raised $43,000 for production of the movie. Estimates for the actual cost of the movie are less than $30,000 as Pennell used part of the movie's budget for his living expenses. Rehearsals began in September 1977, and filming started in early October. The film was shot on location in Austin, Texas. Production wrapped in December 1977 and Pennell started entering the movie in film festivals in 1978.

== Release ==
The film was selected for the USA Film Festival in Dallas in March 1978. It was well received by the festival audience and the trade publication The Hollywood Reporter gave the film good coverage. Pennell made a deal with New Line Cinema for a limited release in the summer of 1978 in New York City and to art-house theaters and college campuses.

== Reception and legacy ==
After the film opened, it was selected for the U.S. Film Festival in Salt Lake City, Utah, in September. It received a special second prize from the jury. The film left a marked impression on festival attendee, Robert Redford, who remarked years later that the movie was an inspiration for starting the Sundance Institute. When he saw the film at Austin, Texas, director Richard Linklater (of Dazed and Confused fame) was also influenced by the film as well.

In April 1979, the film was shown as part of the New Directors/New Films series at the Museum of Modern Art in New York City. Based on more glowing reviews from the series, New Line re-released the movie into theaters that fall.

== See also ==
- Blue Collar – Paul Schrader's crime drama also released the same year
