= The Edge (1968 film) =

Film by Robert Kramer

- Film poster
- Directed by: Robert Kramer
- Written by: Robert Kramer
- Produced by: Robert Kramer; Robert Machover
- Starring: Jack Rader; Tom Griffin; Anne Waldman; Jeff Weiss; Paul Hultberg; Catherine Merrill; Sanford Cohen; Howard Loeb Babeuf
- Cinematography: Robert Machover
- Edited by: Robert Machover
- Production companies: Alpha 60; Blue Van
- Distributed by: Filmmakers Distribution Center
- Release date: March 27, 1968 (NYC)
- Running time: 100 minutes
- Country: United States
- Language: English

The Edge is a 1968 independent drama/thriller film written, directed, and co-produced by Robert Kramer. It stars Jack Rader in the lead role, with Tom Griffin, Paul Hultberg, Howard Loeb Babeuf, Anne Waldman, Jeff Weiss, Sanford Cohen, Catherine Merrill, and others in supporting roles. Robert Machover served as co-producer, cinematographer, and editor.

== Plot summary ==
A discontented anti-war activist contemplates assassinating the president of the United States. His machinations prompt his 16-member underground cell of disgruntled leftists to reassess their purpose.

== Cast ==
- Jack Rader as Daniel Rainier
- Tom Griffin as Tom Eliot
- Howard Loeb Babeuf as Bill Raskin
- Jeff Weiss as Max Laing
- Anne Waldman as Didi Stein
  (as Anne Waldman Warsch)
- Sanford Cohen as Peter Stein
- Paul Hultberg as Sinclair Davis
- Catherine Merrill as Sally Kolka
- Russell Parker as Michael Warren
- Gerald Long as Gerry Toller
- Theodora Bergery as Anne Davis
- Randall Conrad as Randall Kates
- Constance Ullman Long as Connie Barker
- Susan Reiner as girl in bed
- Robert Kramer as mental patient

== Release ==
The film was released on March 27, 1968, in New York City.

== Reception ==
Vincent Canby from The New York Times, in a generally positive review, stated the film "is noteworthy as one of the few examples of underground cinema totally committed to the social-political scene." Jack Seibert of Ultra Dogme lauded the film for its "attention to the specificity in his actors' choreography".
