= The Newsreel =

Formation, films and legacy of Newsreel

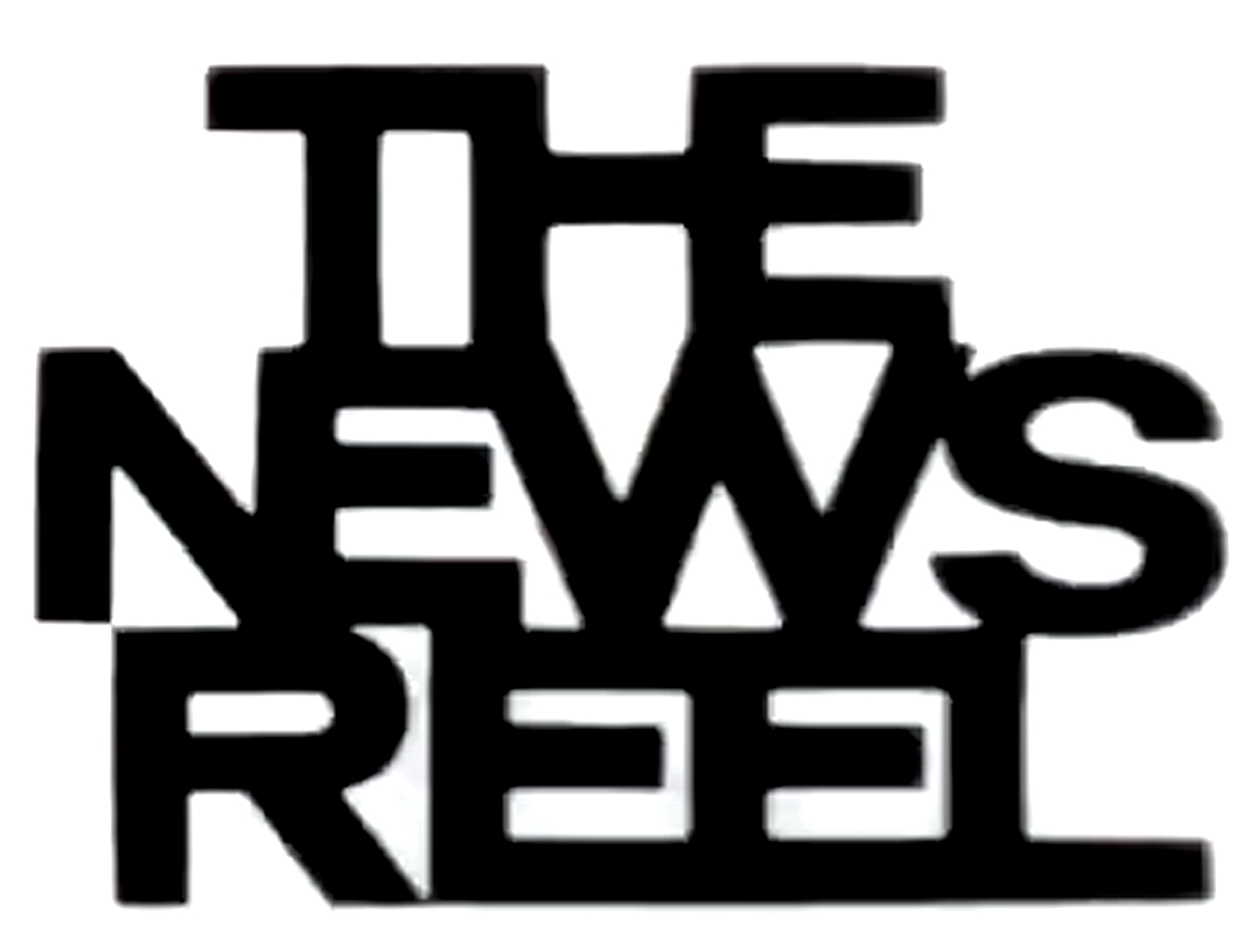
The Newsreel film collective logo

The Newsreel, most frequently called Newsreel, was an American filmmaking collective founded in New York City in late 1967. In keeping with the radical student/youth, antiwar and Black power movements of the time, the group explicitly described its purpose as using "films and other propaganda in aiding the revolutionary movement." The organization quickly established other chapters in San Francisco, Boston, Washington, DC, Atlanta, Detroit, Chicago, Los Angeles and Puerto Rico, and soon claimed "150 full time activists in its 9 regional offices." Co-founder Robert Kramer called for "films that unnerve, that shake people's assumptions…[that] explode like grenades in people’s faces, or open minds like a good can opener." Their film's production logo was a flashing graphic of The Newsreel moving in and out violently in cadence with the staccato sounds of a machine gun (see animated clip at right). A contemporary issue of Film Quarterly described it as "the cinematic equivalent of Leroi Jones's line 'I want poems that can shoot bullets.'" The films produced by Newsreel soon became regular viewing at leftwing political gatherings during the late 1960s and early 1970s; seen in "parks, church basements, on the walls of buildings, in union halls, even at Woodstock." This history has been largely ignored by film and academic historians causing the academic Nathan Rosenberger to remark: "it is curious that Newsreel only occasionally shows up in historical studies of the decade."

The Newsreel logo—animated clip with the staccato sounds of a machine gun

While the political left, Western intellectuals and cinephiles of those times often appreciated Newsreel's films, some critics also recognized their quality and the talent involved. An investigator for the House Committee on Internal Security observed during Congressional hearings: "although they are very peculiarly dressed and look rather peculiar...they do have some film-making talent because many of those films are quality films although they are extremely propagandistic and distorted. They are well put together."

== Founding ==
Several founding members of Newsreel have written that it was the October 21, 1967 antiwar march of 100,000 people on Washington, DC and the Pentagon that was the precipitating event leading to the formation of the organization. A number of them were at the demonstration and, as the film historian Bill Nichols described it, observed "that the police brutality (tear gas, beatings, etc.) which they witnessed as a widespread phenomenon was minimized by the television reports." They decided that new and improved news outlets were required. On December 22, 1967, after several smaller initial meetings, the first Newsreel filmmaking collective was officially formed in New York City at the Film-Makers’ Cinematheque, soon to become the Anthology Film Archives. Depending on the source, somewhere between 30 and 70 people were at the founding meeting. The new organization proclaimed itself "a radical news service whose purpose is to provide an alternative to the limited and biased coverage of television news." It defined its "primary audiences" as "people working for change, students, organizations in ghettos and other depressed areas". Early members ranged from the relatively famous to the unknown and from experienced filmmakers to novices. They included Norman Fruchter, Robert Kramer, Christine Choy, Jonas Mekas, Tami Gold, Allan Siegel, Deborah Shaffer, John Douglas, Roz Payne, Peter Gessner, Melvin Margolis and Robert Machover; with Kramer, Fruchter and Gessner already being established filmmakers. Another member, Barbara Stone, recalled years later that "No one was officially credited on any of the films.... It would have been against the anti-establishment ideals to take any form of credit." The group was officially incorporated in 1968 as Camera News, Inc., although it never used the corporation name.

It began to develop its own unique style, which Kramer called "an 'empirical' approach to filmmaking... Present[ing] actual material with minimum of scientific analysis." This was described by photojournalist Jake Sherman as "[j]erky camera angles, violent quick transitions, and searing classical scores...meant to be interpreted as 'battle footage'". Michael Renov, with the School of Cinematic Arts at the University of Southern California, called their films "guerrilla footage" and a "refuge from the seamless, ideologically complicit products of the culture industry." They were deeply influenced by radical filmmakers of what was then often called the Third World and the movements for decolonization and revolution that were occurring in those countries. For example, Kramer's thinking echoes the ideas of Julio Garcia Espinosa from Cuba who argued that what he called "[i]mperfect cinema is no longer interested in quality or technique...no longer interested in predetermined taste, and much less in 'good taste.'" The early Newsreel members were also influenced by Octavio Genito and Fernando Solanas of Argentina who argued for the "decolonization of culture" and a "cinema of liberation" in films that were to use the "camera as rifles". "There was no doubt", Nichols argues, "that these were agit-prop films...designed to foster political resistance to government actions and policies."

Rosenberger argues that "Newsreel was therefore part of an international movement that sought to use film to push back against the colonial and imperialistic powers." He also notes that Newsreel created "relationships and alliances" with other radical filmmaking groups around the world. Leonard M. Henny, a Dutch filmmaker, teacher and writer stated that "Newsreel served as a model for groups in England, Holland, Sweden, and Germany".

It also worked towards a distribution network which matched its radical and movement oriented goals. They called it "community distribution" and argued that films should not be commodities. An early article Newsreel submitted to the underground press explained, "If the films were not to be commodities they had to be distributed through non-theatrical channels where they could reach people in a community situation." This meant that films were to be distributed through leftwing channels already established and growing within and between the movements of the day. Films were to be put "into the hands of organizers and activists" who were expected to use it in their "daily political work. Payne put it this way, "We wanted people to work with our films as catalysts for political discussions about social change in America and to relate the questions in the films to issues in their own communities." She added, "We didn't like to just send our films out; we would go out and speak with our films. We saw them as weapons." Much of this did take place - as stated above, their films became regular, even popular, events at movement and counter-culture gatherings.

Like much of the New Left, Newsreel started as a mainly white, male-dominated organization, but soon became more diverse, by 1971 it "was not only predominantly non-white, it was also female-led. It worked with people of all races, ages, genders, and ethnicities." Newsreel continues today in the form of its two offspring, Third World Newsreel and California Newsreel.

== Films ==
Within its first three years of existence Newsreel produced around 60 films covering many of the movements for change swirling around them, with a major emphasis on the anti-Vietnam War movement. They dealt with subjects like resistance to the war, draft-card burnings, student and youth protests and rebellions, the Black Panther Party (BPP), the Women's Movement, as well as a number of other subjects.

=== Early films ===
==== Resist - With Noam Chomsky ====
Newsreel's first film was Resist - With Noam Chomsky, an interview with the well known linguist and professor about his views on the Vietnam War, draft resistance and more. This twelve minute film was produced by the New York City chapter and released in early 1968.

==== No Game ====
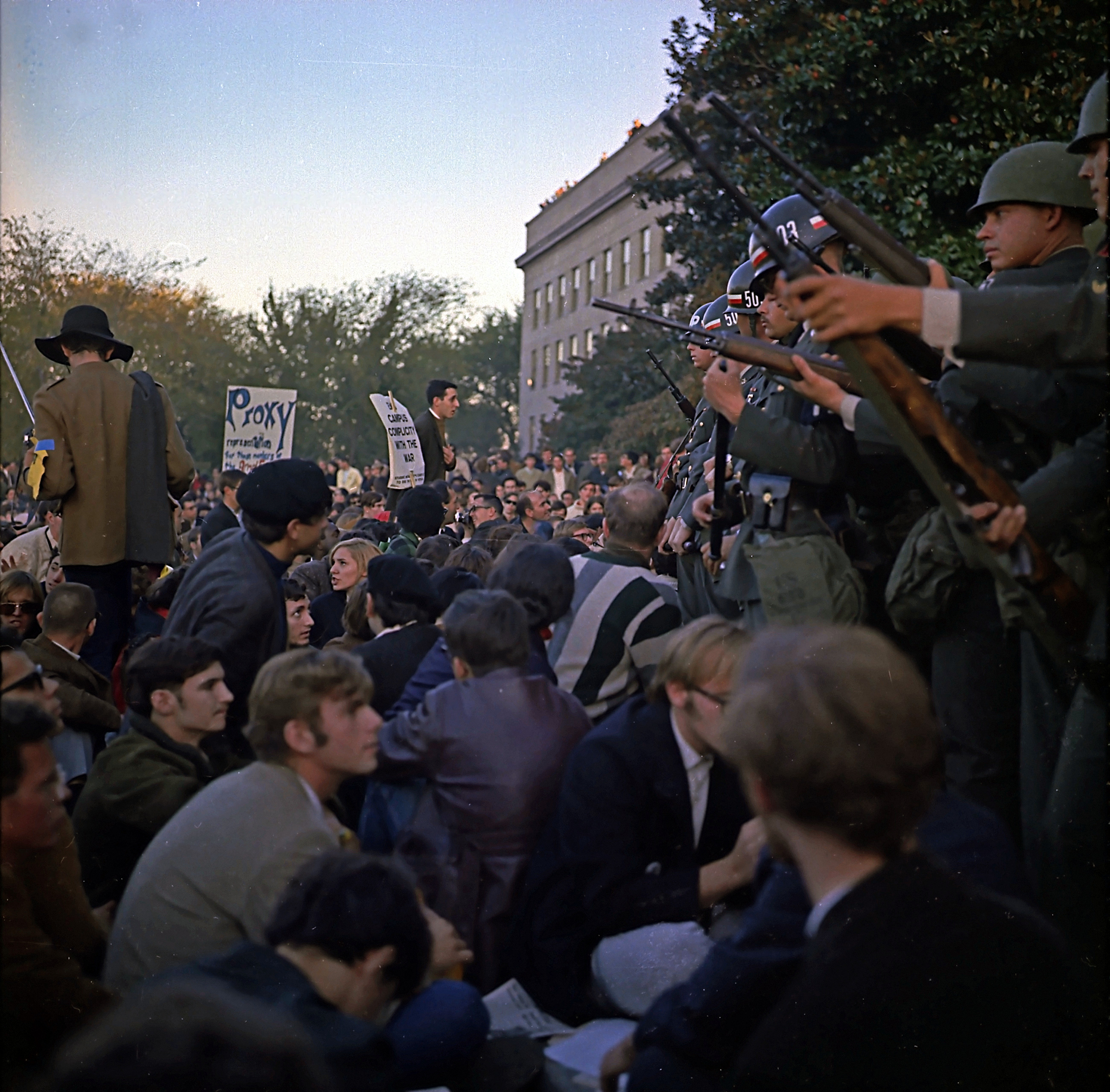
Demonstrators facing troops in front of the Pentagon, Oct. 21, 1967

With the October 21, 1967 October 1967 antiwar march of 100,000 people on Washington, DC and the Pentagon being a seminal event in the group's formation, their second film documented the episode. Several filmmakers who had taken footage during the demonstrations (Marvin Fishman, Masanori Oe and Jonathan Chernoble) were willing to give it to the newly formed Newsreel. This film became the seventeen minute No Game released in 1968. It shows the peaceful march that ended on the grounds of the Pentagon, as well as dramatic footage from "in the midst of the fixed bayonets and billy clubs as the military turned on the demonstrators".

==== American Sailors ====
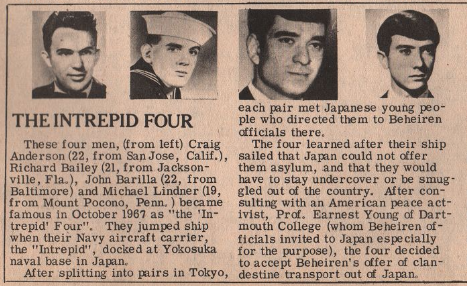
The Intrepid Four were the subject of Newsreel's third film

Newsreel's third film was Four American Sailors a.k.a. Four Americans. It documented an extended interview with the Intrepid Four, four U.S. Navy seamen who deserted from the USS Intrepid aircraft carrier in protest against the war in Vietnam. Their action in 1967 was one of the first public protests against the war by American troops and the first within the U.S. Navy. Recorded in Japan where the sailors had deserted, the 19 minute film was released in 1968.

==== Jeannette Rankin Brigade ====
Jeannette Rankin Brigade was Newsreel's fourth film and the first directed and edited by women. It covered an anti-Vietnam War demonstration in January 1968 led by Jeannette Rankin, who was a pacifist, suffragette, women's rights advocate, and the first woman to hold federal office in the U.S. An estimated 5,000 to 10,000 women marched, making it the largest march by women since the Woman Suffrage Parade of 1913.

==== Garbage ====
Garbage a.k.a. Garbage Demonstration a.k.a. Up Against the Wall MotherFucker: Garbage was Newsreel's fifth film. It followed young demonstrators from New York City's Lower East Side as they dumped a truck full of garbage at Lincoln Center in support of a New York City garbage collectors strike and expressing contempt for "the bourgeois establishment". Their leaflet proclaimed, "America turns the world into Garbage, It turns its ghettos into garbage, It turns Vietnam into Garbage...we of the Lower East Side have decided to bring this cultural revolution to Lincoln Center – in Bags, Is not Lincoln Center where it belongs?" The demonstrators were from Up Against the Wall Motherfucker, a Lower East Side affinity group considered a "street gang with analysis".

==== Columbia Revolt ====
One of Newsreel’s most widely viewed early films was Columbia Revolt from the New York City chapter about the Columbia University student protests and building takeovers in 1968. This was one of the first campus uprisings of the late 1960s with a number of buildings, including the president's office, being occupied by the students. Students had discovered links between the university and a think tank helping the U.S. Department of Defense wage the Vietnam War. They were also outraged by the planned demolition of a nearby Black working-class neighborhood for a new university gym, quickly named "Gym Crow" after the Jim Crow laws the Civil rights movement was protesting in the Southern U.S. After five days of student control, protesters were violently removed by the New York City Police Department. Much of this was documented by Newsreel film crew. Apparently the film was so incendiary that following a viewing students at the State University of New York at Buffalo campus attacked the campus ROTC building. According to the New York City underground newspaper RAT, "five hundred members of the audience arose and made their way to the University ROTC building [where they] proceeded to smash windows, tear up furniture and destroy machines until the office was a total wreck". Released late in 1968, Columbia Revolt was Newsreel's fourteenth film.

=== Anti-Vietnam War films ===
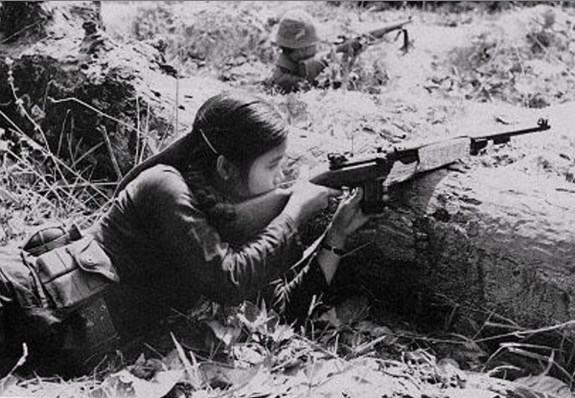
People's War is a rare look at the Vietnamese side of the war

The Vietnam War and the rapidly expanding antiwar efforts within U.S. society and worldwide, were a major focus for Newsreel in its early years. In addition to five of the films already mentioned, each of which had a significant antiwar emphasis—No Game, Resist–With Noam Chomsky, American Sailors, Jeannette Rankin Brigade, and Columbia Revolt—there were those in this section and in the next section on the 1968 Democratic Convention Demonstration Films.

==== People's War ====
People's War was Newsreel’s 43rd film and, at 40 minutes, one of their longer early films. It was released in late 1969, but only after a court battle with the U.S. Government. The film's original footage was seized by US Customs agents when the filmmakers, Fruchter, Kramer and Douglas, arrived at Kennedy International Airport on August 7, 1969. While the film was being examined by Army intelligence agents, the filmmakers sued in the U.S. District court accusing the Government of trying to "harass and intimidate" them for exercising their First Amendment right of free speech. Within three days the Government had backed down and returned the 12,000 feet of film. The film itself recorded the Vietnamese people as they waged their country's fight against the U.S. military. It is one of the few American made films to look at the war from the perspective of the Vietnamese. IMDb calls it "a vivid portrait of the countryside and ways of life during the war.".

==== Only the Beginning ====
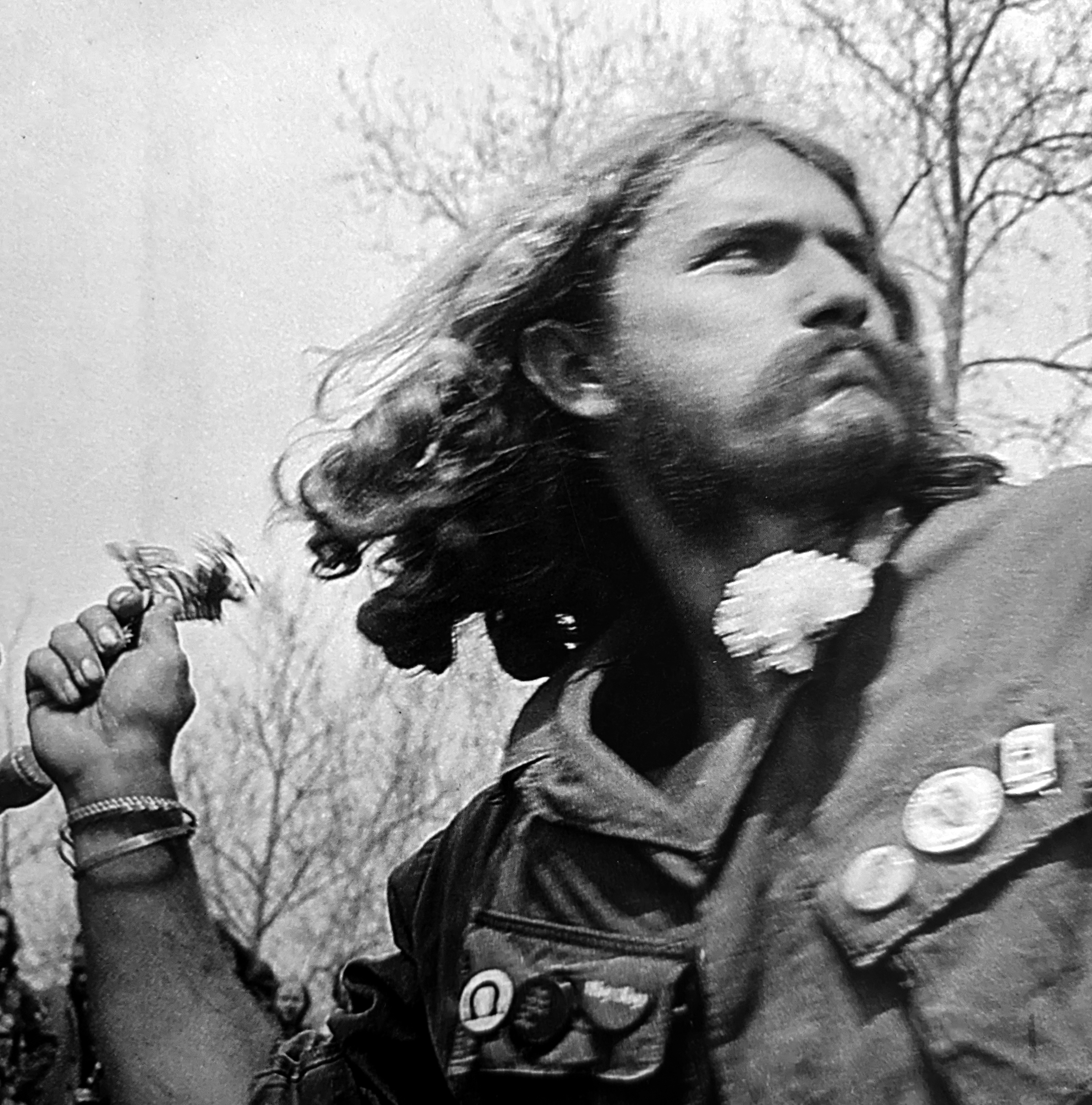
Only the Beginning documents Vietnam veterans throwing their medals at the US Capital April 23, 1971

Only the Beginning was 20 minutes long and released in 1971. It was Newsreel's 59th film and documented the Vietnam Veterans Against the War demonstrations in Washington, D.C. in April 1971. By this point in the war Vietnam veterans had become among the most active and effective antiwar protesters. Over one thousand gathered for several days, culminating as, one by one, they mounted a platform, spoke briefly about why they were there and then angrily threw their medals onto the steps of the US Capitol. Newsreel's footage is one of the few visual records available of this protest. The film is bookended by parts of this "reverse" medal ceremony. The rest of the film contains dramatic scenes from the war with veteran voiceovers explaining the devastation they witnessed as well as their ultimate disillusionment. They talk about the anti-Asian indoctrination they received in the military and several of them draw a parallel with their own experience with racism in the U.S. One veteran explains how he began to identify with "the enemy"—he realized "You're killing your own brothers." The film ends like a "grenade" as a vet hurls his medals towards the Capitol yelling, "If we have to fight again, it will be to take these steps", followed immediately by Newsreel's flashing logo and the sound of a machine gun. Excerpts from the film are used in David Zeiger's award-winning film Sir! No Sir! about the anti-war movement within the ranks of the United States Armed Forces during the Vietnam War.

==== America a.k.a. Amerika ====
America or Amerika was a 30-minute film released in 1969. It shows the development of the Vietnam War and the antiwar movement around the U.S. Interviews with Vietnam veterans, teenagers, and Black militants and shown with the growing protest movements and police repression.

==== Army ====
Newsreel's 36th film was called Army or the Army Film. It was released in 1969 and in 18 minutes documents the growing antiwar sentiment within the U.S. military. The filmmaker, Alan Jacobs, spent months at the Fort Dix antiwar coffeehouse talking to and interviewing soldiers. U.S. Army film excerpts are combined with interviews to show the difficult conditions and indoctrination in Army bootcamp. The film's message is that the military training made the atrocities of the Vietnamese War all too possible. The film was used during the war at GI Coffeehouses and other centers of soldier and sailor resistance to the war.

=== 1968 Democratic Convention Demonstration films ===
Chicago Police dragging protester during the 1968 Democratic National Convention. Sign behind reads 'Make Love Not War'.

Newsreel produced four films documenting events related to the protests and demonstrations at the 1968 Democratic National Convention in Chicago, Illinois. 10,000 demonstrators gathered to protest the Vietnam War, only to be met by 23,000 police and National Guardsmen. The police violently attacked demonstrators in what was later termed a "police riot" by the National Commission on the Causes and Prevention of Violence. On the evening of August 28, with the police riot in full swing, television networks broadcast live as the besieged anti-war protesters began the chant, "The whole world is watching".

==== Chicago Convention Challenge ====
Newsreel's seventeen minute film Chicago Convention Challenge was released later that same year using footage taken in the midst of demonstrations, meeting rooms, at rallies, and in the streets.

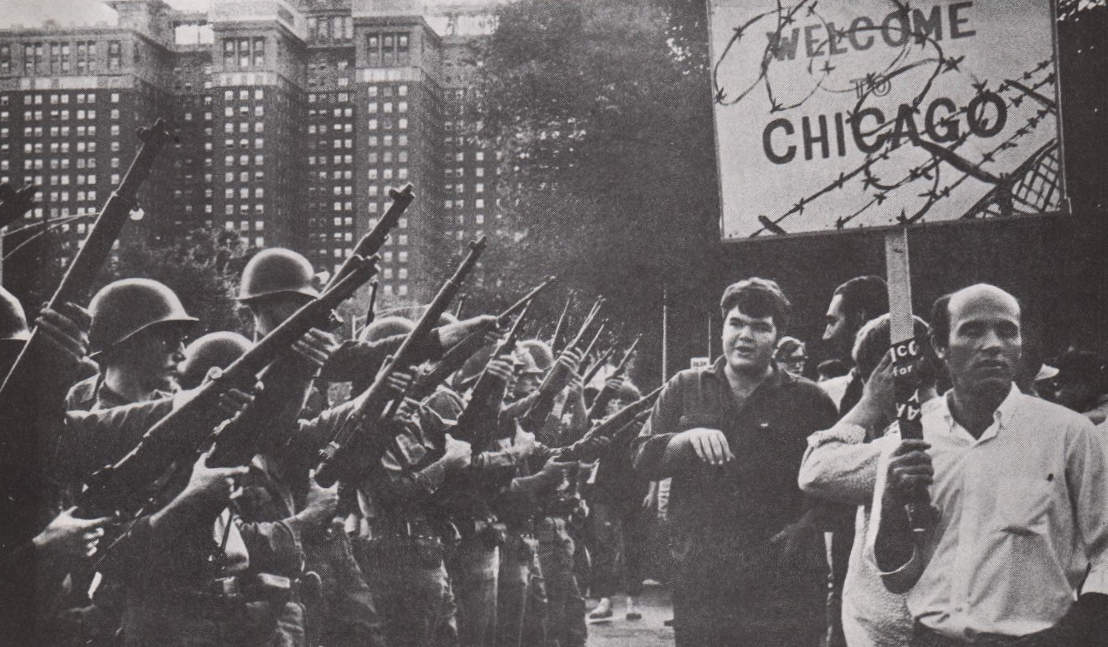
Chicago Democratic Convention 1968 - National Guard and Demonstrators

==== Chicago and April Film ====
In 1968 they also released two films documenting the preparations made by the two main opposing forces building towards the Convention clashes. The fifteen minute film called Chicago documented planning meetings of the demonstration organizers, while the April Film a.k.a. Chicago, April 27th showed the Chicago police force practicing their violent tactics against antiwar marchers five months before the convention.

==== Summer '68 ====
In 1969 they released Summer '68, created by Fruchter and Douglas, which looked at some of the organizing leading to the convention and culminated with scenes at the convention itself. It showed draft resistance organizing in Boston, a GI coffeehouse in Fort Hood, Texas, the growth of alternative underground media, and some of the early days of Newsreel itself, including their takeover of New York City's Channel 13 (WNET - PBS). Some leaders of the Chicago demonstrations are interviewed, including Rennie Davis, Tom Hayden and Dave Dellinger. At 60 minutes, this was early Newsreel's longest film.

=== Black Panther Party films ===
Most of Newsreel's films on the Black Panther Party were made by the San Francisco chapter, near where the Panthers were founded. Repression was made by the Los Angeles chapter.

==== Black Panther ====
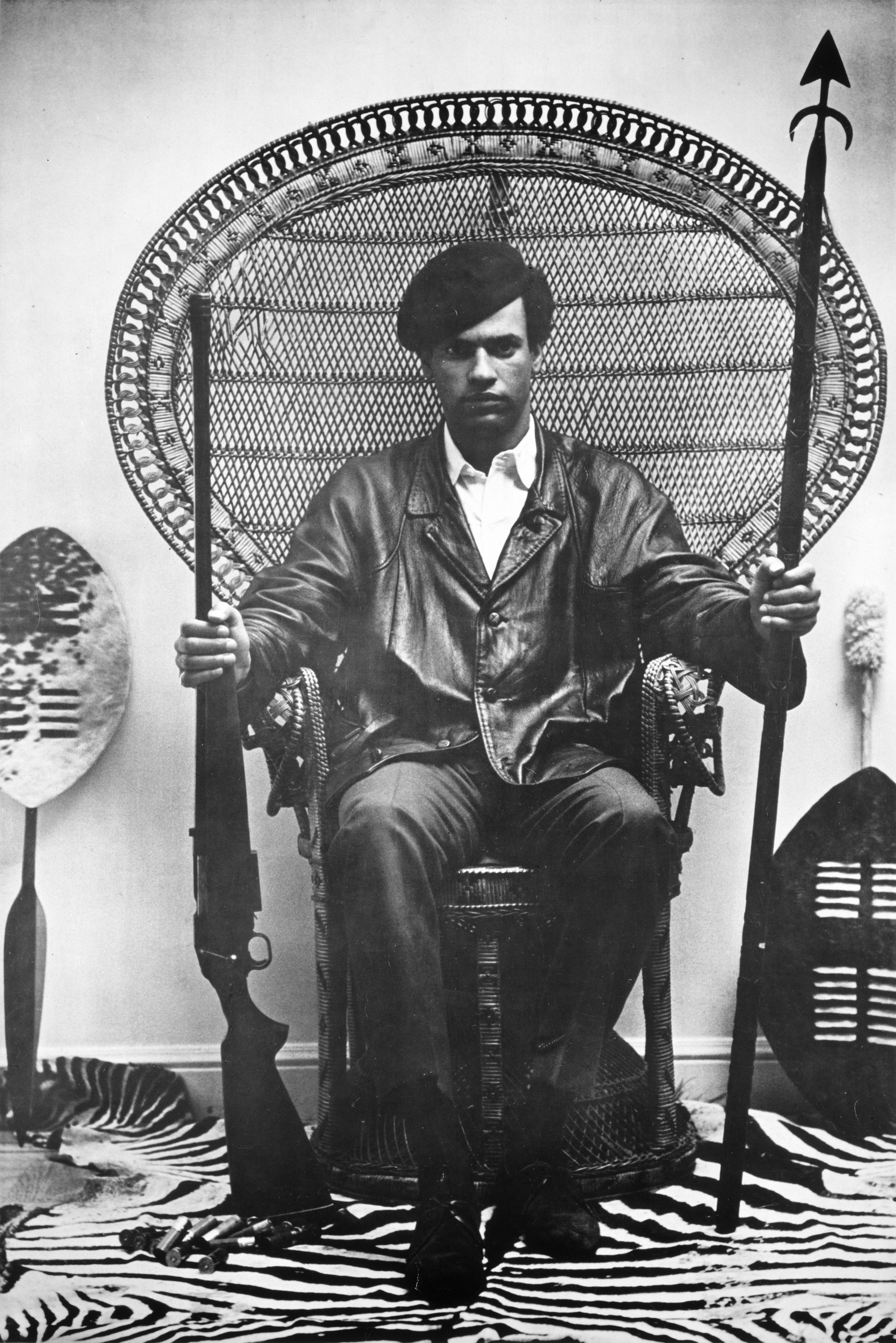
Black Panther contains an interview with Huey Newton

Black Panther also known as Off the Pig was one of Newsreel’s most distributed and well known early films. It was one of the first films made about the BPP, and documents their early leadership, as well as the group's philosophy and activities. It contains interviews with Huey P. Newton, the Party's Minister of Defense, from his prison cell, and with Eldridge Cleaver, the Minister of Information. It also shows scenes at rallies and demonstrations, and a reading of the Party's 10 Point Program by Bobby Seale, as well as footage of the results of the police attack on the Los Angeles Chapter's headquarters. The film ends in Newsreel's explosive style with Seale saying "We're gonna say to the whole damned government, 'Stick 'em up, motherfucker; this is a hold-up!'." This fifteen minute film was Newsreel's nineteenth and was released in late 1968.

==== May Day Panther ====
Also known as May Day 1969, this film was Newsreel's 29th. It was fifteen minutes long and released by the San Francisco chapter in 1969. It documents a large rally in San Francisco demanding more rights for Black Americans and calling for the release of Huey P. Newton. It contains footage of speeches by Panther members Kathleen Cleaver and Bobby Seale, as well as Newton's attorney Charles Garry, and student activist Bob Avakian speaking to the "white people" in the audience", and others. The film includes footage of the police raid on Panther headquarters in San Francisco a few days prior to the rally, the Panther's Breakfast for Children Program, and Panther members distributing copies of Mao's Little Red Red Book.

==== Bobby Seale ====
This 1969 film was also known as Interview with Bobby Seale. It was Newsreel's 44th film and was 15 minutes long. It consisted of a prison interview with the then Chairman of the BPP who had been imprisoned on charges of conspiracy and inciting a riot in the wake of the protests and demonstrations at the 1968 Democratic National Convention in Chicago. He talks about his treatment as a "political prisoner" and why he is involved in the Black Liberation and anti-Vietnam War movements. Seale was later cleared of all charges.

==== United Front Against Racism ====
This 1969 film is 20 minutes long and was Newsreel's 37th. It's a documentary report on a 3-day BPP conference in Oakland, California, in July 1969. It covers what was called "the nature of developing Fascism in the U.S." and records discussions on subjects like imperialism, capitalism, racism, workers, health, women, political prisoners, students and the military.

==== Repression ====
This film was created by the Los Angeles chapter of Newsreel in 1969 but never released. It was rediscovered in 1997 and then released. It intersperses footage of Black people working in chain gangs and on menial jobs with interviews with BPP members in Los Angeles. The Panthers interviewed talk about the history of exploitation of Black people in the U.S. and all over the world in colonies and semi-colonies, all to serve "capitalist imperialists." Rosenberger called it "one of the most direct callings of any Newsreel film for a worldwide working-class revolution.".

=== Women's liberation and feminist films ===
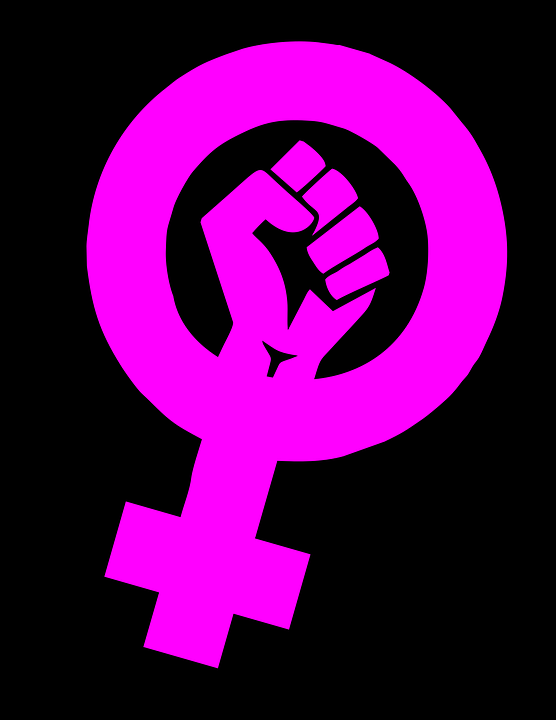
Newsreel produced some of the first films in feminism's second-wave

Newsreel produced numerous films related to women and feminism and some of the first in what has been called the second-wave of feminism.

==== Up Against the Wall Ms. America ====
Newsreel’s 22nd film, was Up Against the Wall Ms. America. This eight minute film came out in 1968 showing women's liberation activists protesting and carrying out guerilla theater outside the Miss America pageant on September 7, 1968. The protesters marched, passed out leaflets, and crowned a live sheep to compare the beauty pageant to livestock competitions at county fairs. To further illustrate the point, they produced a drawing of a woman's figure marked up like a side of beef.

==== She's Beautiful When She's Angry ====
She's Beautiful When She's Angry was Newsreel’s 48th film. At 17 min, it documents a feminist street theater skit at an abortion rights rally in 1969. In it a beauty pageant contestant is coached for the role she must fulfill to be crowned the winner. Each of the "coaches" wears an identifying sign: "mother", "boyfriend", "teacher", "ad man", and a "capitalist".

==== Make-Out ====
Make-Out, a brief five minute film, was Newsreel’s 49th. It shows a young couple making out in a car while in voice-over we hear the woman worrying about her reputation and what the man's intentions are. The voice-over script was created at a women's group discussion. Newsreel later pulled the film from distribution deciding it did not "go far enough in breaking down and analyzing" accepted norms of sexual behavior.

==== The Woman's Film ====
The Woman's Film was Newsreel's 55th film and is considered by some to be one of their "finest efforts." At 40 minutes long, it came out in 1971, produced collectively by women in the San Francisco chapter. It has been praised for elevating "real women beyond...sexual stereotypes." It interviews a diverse group of women in their homes doing their regular work: ironing, cooking and taking care of children. The script was developed after initial interviews with the women in the film and their input was sought as the film progressed. It was fairly widely viewed, including at the Museum of Modern Art, some movie theaters and the Los Angeles Film Festival.

==== Daycare ====
Daycare (a.k.a. Childcare: People's Liberation and Children’s Liberation) was Newsreel’s 56th film. Made by the New York City chapter in 1970, it ran for 20 minutes. The film examines how conventional mother oriented childcare ties mothers and children down, narrowing their experiences, while community run childcare centers can free parents and children to all be more involved in society. Filmed in NYC daycare centers, it documents what good parent-controlled daycare could mean for children and parents. The filmmakers Bonnie Friedman and Karen Mitnik explained their motivation, "Being activist filmmakers, we were interested in showing everyday people taking control of their situation by utilizing empty community space to set up their own daycare centers."

==== Herstory ====
Herstory, Newsreel's 61st film, was produced by the San Francisco chapter and released in 1970. It is 9 minutes long and documents a theatrical presentation which reinterprets women's history from a female perspective. It has been described as "an attempt to reinterpret history, to disrupt the way it has been coded to respect male dominance and ignore women's contributions." It includes women speaking directly to the camera, drawing the audience into their narrative.

==== Janie's Janie ====
Janie's Janie which came out in 1971 has been called "an extraordinary document of the early 1970's women's movement." It was made by Geri Ashur, Peter Barton, Marilyn Mulford and Stephanie Palewski. It focuses on Jane Giese, a working-class woman in Newark, NJ who is struggling "to take control of her own life after years of physical and mental abuse." As she describes it in the film, "First I was my father's Janie, then I was my Charlie's Janie, now I'm Janie's Janie."

=== Other films ===
Some of Newsreel's other notable films include:

==== The Case Against Lincoln Center ====
The Case Against Lincoln Center, released in 1968, was Newsreel 17th film. At 12 minutes long, it documented the displacement of 20,000 families in order to make way for the construction of Lincoln Center in New York City, the home of the New York Philharmonic, the Metropolitan Opera, the New York City Ballet, and the Juilliard School of Music. The film contrasts the wealthy atmosphere and patrons of the new center with "the vibrant street culture" of the displaced neighborhoods.

==== Richmond Oil Strike ====
Union a.k.a. Oil Strike a.k.a. Richmond Oil Strike was made by the San Francisco chapter and was Newsreel's 25th film and its first specifically about labor struggles. It documented the January 1969 strike of oil workers in Northern California, where, perhaps for the first time, the striking workers asked radical students at San Francisco State and the University of California to join the struggle. The academic Zachary Williams called it, "one of the only such alliances between industrial workers and revolutionary students" during those years. During the strike, local police and company security attacked the strikers, injuring several and killing one worker. The film contains interviews with striking workers and family members who describe police abuses and the growing worker-student unity that emerged. One worker describes how prior to his own experience with police brutality in the United States he would tell his children when seeing similar police-demonstrator clashes on TV that it was just "radical troublemakers out looking for publicity"—"Now", he says "I have changed my mind." The film includes voiceovers and footage of speeches by local radicals and activists like Bob Avakian, then a leader of the Revolutionary Union, a forerunner of the Revolutionary Communist Party.

==== Community Control ====
Community Control, Newsreel's 24th film, documents 1968 efforts of Black and Latino community members in three New York City school districts to establish community-run education. Black leaders from the community are interviewed demanding community control of the schools and other institutions in the neighborhoods, including firefighting and police. The police are shown as an oppressive force in the neighborhoods as community members are demanding the reassignment of several teachers seen as racists. The confrontations ultimately lead to a citywide teachers strike.

==== People's Park ====
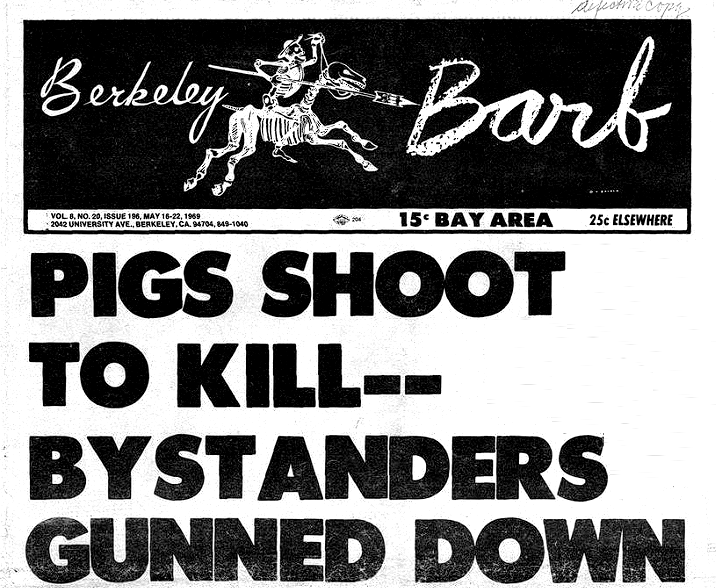
Berkeley Barb People's Park Cover May 16, 1969 - Police and National Guard attacked protesters

People's Park was Newsreel's 33rd film. At 25 minutes it came out in 1969. It documents a major series of confrontations over the future of a patch of land in Berkeley, CA which came to be called People's Park. In the late 1960s the University of California, Berkeley began purchasing the land and destroying a neighborhood populated by hippies, poor people, and others from what was then called the "counter culture". Over a series of months the land was occupied by radical students, residents, and others who opposed the university's plans. This all became a major issue in California with the then Governor Ronald Reagan calling in the police, and eventually, the National Guard. Well over a hundred students and local residents were injured by the police in the resulting confrontation, and one person was killed by multiple police shotgun wounds. The film documents "the youthful exuberance of the students and the grim authoritarianism of the police and soldiers."

==== San Francisco State: On Strike ====
San Francisco State: On Strike a.k.a. San Francisco State Sit In came out in 1969 and was Newsreel's 26th film. It was a 25-minute documentary about the San Francisco State strike of 1968-69, which lasted over five months and became the longest strike by students at an academic institution in the U.S. The central student demands were for more inclusivity for people of color. The police were often called in to restore order and reports of police brutality were common.

==== The Earth Belongs to the People ====
The Earth Belongs to the People was Newsreel's 57th film and one of the first to speak to the building climate crisis. It came out in 1971 and was seventeen minutes in length. It addressed the overpopulation concerns of the times arguing that what the world faced was not an overpopulation crisis, but severe unequal distribution of wealth and food caused by the drive for corporate profit. It made the point that it was not individual people who were endangering the environment but large scale industry. It posed the question of whether the earth is for people or for corporate profit.

== Congressional investigation ==
In both June and December 1969 Newsreel was investigated "rather closely" by the House Committee on Internal Security as part of a larger investigation of the Students for a Democratic Society (SDS) for possible "subversive activities affecting the internal security of the United States." The committee was looking into Newsreel's relationship with SDS, its association "with many of the other militant groups operating in the country", and the trip of Fruchter, Douglas and Kramer to Vietnam during the filming of People's War. The Committee investigated and conducted surveillance on Newsreel, including going so far as to subpoena their Federal income tax return for the fiscal year March 1968 through February 1969 from the Internal Revenue Service. Committee investigator Herbert Romerstein testified that Newsreel produced "popaganda films about the war in Vietnam" and used "their facilities as a propaganda medium rather than as a legitimate news-gathering medium." He concluded that Newsreel was "part of the propaganda arsenal of SDS." Williams observed that a showing of Newsreel's Black Panther by SDS at Georgetown University "was deemed sufficiently important to be the subject of multiple subpoenaed testimonies before the Committee".

== Transformation ==
As the original Newsreel moved into the 1970s it began to change significantly. Criticisms and debate surfaced about the mainly white male leadership and a newer more diverse leadership began to emerge, including more women. The radical movements of the 1960s were also going through significant changes and political turmoil, with some organizations declining while others grew. With this as the backdrop, Newsreel slowly gave birth to two new organizations, both of which still exist and continue "to work for social change and equality." See Third World Newsreel and California Newsreel.

== Legacy ==
During its existence, it was involved with and documenting many of the most well known and influential groups and trends on the political left at the time, including the Black Panther Party, the Young Lords, the League of Revolutionary Black Workers, the Yippies, Vietnam Veterans Against the War, GI coffeehouses, numerous feminist and women's liberation groups, as well as the Cuban and Vietnamese people and governments. They considered themselves a part of the left and were often accepted and welcomed as allies among the activists in demonstrations, meetings, etc. Newsreel's film footage was frequently taken in the midst of radical activity like the uprising at San Francisco State, the occupation of Columbia University, the police attacks during the 1968 Democratic National Convention in Chicago, and many more. All of which makes it even more striking that the organization has been mainly ignored in histories of the period.

== See also ==
- California Newsreel
- Third World Newsreel
