= Fronza Woods =

American filmmaker

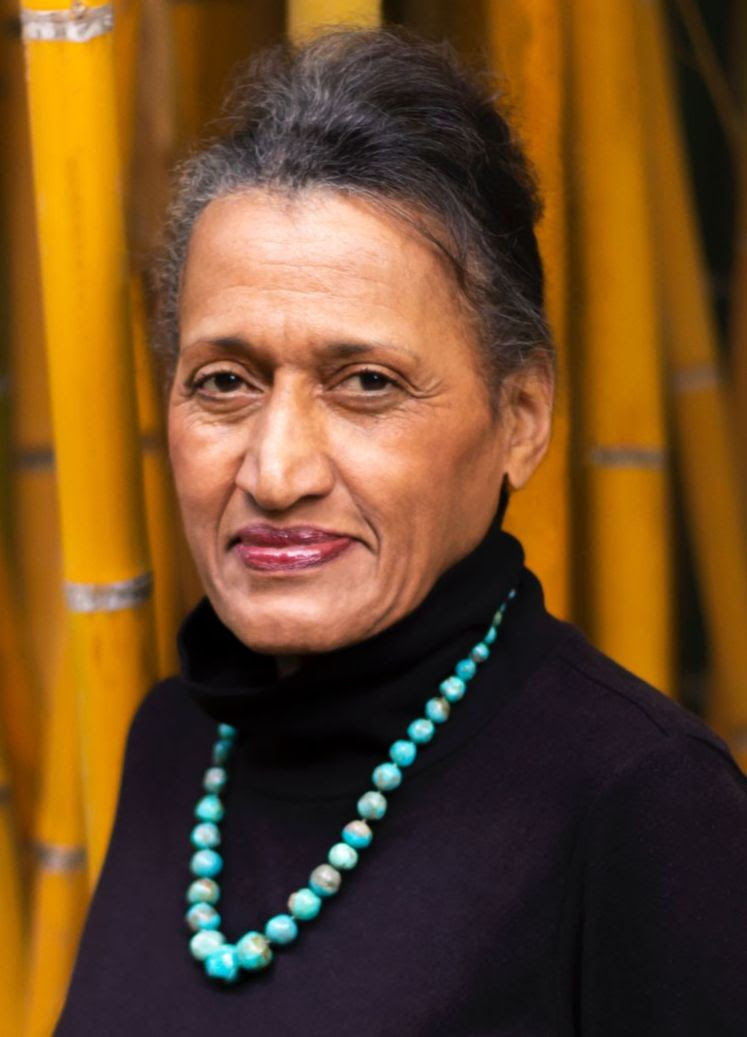
- Woods in October 2019
- Born: October 20, 1943 (age 82); Detroit, Michigan, U.S.
- Education: Wayne State University
- Occupations: Film director; professor

Fronza Woods is an American filmmaker best known for her short films including Killing Time (1979) and Fannie's Film (1982).

== Biography ==
Woods was born in Detroit. She attended Wayne State University in Detroit, and graduated with a BA in Mass Communications and Russian.

Woods began her career as a junior copywriter at a small Detroit advertising agency. In 1967, she relocated to New York City where she started working in television at ABC as a production assistant in the documentary unit. She also taught Pilates for a number of years at the Robert Fitzgerald Studio in Manhattan.

Before making her own films, Woods worked on shorts at the Women's Interart Center in Hell's Kitchen, with the support of Ellen Hovde and Muffie Meyer. She also worked as a guest filmmaker in the Film Society of Lincoln Center's "Artist in the Schools program." Woods reflected on the start of her film career: "Almost nothing I've done in my life has really been by choice. I went into advertising because I was offered a job, I went into television because I was offered a job. The first time I chose something, it was movies."

In addition to making her own films, Woods was an assistant sound engineer for the John Sayles-directed film The Brother from Another Planet. She was also involved as a cast member in the 1985 film, The Man Who Envied Women. Of her role in the film industry, Woods said "I think the male-female divisions are more defining". Woods said that she was influenced by people as diverse as Bill Moyers, Malcolm X, Georgia O'Keeffe and others.

Woods attended NYU film school until she left to become a teacher. She moved to Milwaukee where she taught filmmaking at the University of Wisconsin-Milwaukee. After meeting her husband she immigrated to France in 1987.

== Short films ==
=== Killing Time (1979) ===
Killing Time is a 1979 narrative short film written and directed by Woods. The film is a dark comedy that follows a woman (played by Woods but credited with the stage name "Sage Brush") as she prepares to commit suicide. The duration of the film is 9 minutes. Richard Brody called Killing Time "very simply, one of the best short films that I've ever seen." In response, Woods reflected: "The most beautiful, thoughtful, understanding and generous analysis being Richard Brody’s review of the series in his The Front Row column for The New Yorker. I was touched and stunned that he was able to empathize so deeply with the plight of black women filmmakers of that era." Hugues Perrot describes the film: "...a bitter and insolent ballad, shows the casual disarray of a woman, alone in her room, searching for the appropriate attire for her suicide. In a jaunty rather than joyful tone (her artificially cheerful whistling), the film ends up hypnotising us, humour acting less as a safety valve than as a corollary of despair." Woods says of the film: "I would have a protagonist whose inability to decide what to wear in order to kill herself would ultimately save her life. It was never a film about suicide. It's a film about what you think will happen if you kill yourself. I don't want to make light of suicide, it's not a light matter." Speaking on the film's origins, Woods recalls: "Killing Time was the best I could come up with, on the quick, for a subject for a student film. It was developed around this very simple truth a friend observed about me—that I would never be able to commit suicide because I wouldn't know what to wear." Meditating on vanity, ego, self-pity, and self-importance, Woods's film sought to use humor as a means of humanizing suicidal ideation.

=== Fannie's Film (1981) ===
Fannie's Film is a 1981 documentary short that follows 65-year old Fannie Drayton, a cleaning woman. The film is told from the perspective of Drayton and is 15 minutes in duration. Hugues Perrot writes: "In parallel with the hieratic figures that come and go on the sports machines, she is filmed alone cleaning the studio emptied of its ghosts. The film upends paradigms, plunging the visible world into a bare space and giving body to an inaudible voice – a voice that is especially moving as it recounts the joyfulness of the life it has led." Fannie's Film was selected for the 1985 Créteil International Women's Film Festival. Woods comments: "I like films about real people. I am inspired by almost everything but especially by struggle. I am interested in people who take on a challenge, no matter how great or small, and come to terms with it. What inspires me are people who don't sit on life's rump but have the courage, energy, and audacity not only to grab it by the horns, but to steer it as well." With Fannie's Film, Woods' saw the short as an opportunity to filmically express her own anger about inequality and "benign" racism. Woods, of the film, said "I really did want people to think about the "invisible" people who make their lives more livable. I wanted to make a film that showed that those people have rich lives and people that love them, too. They, too, dream. They, too, can be funny and insightful. But you'll never know it if you don't engage with them, if you pretend they don't exist. In hindsight, it sounds embarrassingly 'worthy!'"

== Legacy and impact ==
Woods is one of the first black woman directors that completed multiple short films. In 2017, BAM Cinematheque in New York City included both Killing Time and Fannie's Film in a new season. This proved to be the start of a contemporary "re-discovery" of Woods's work. Woods describes receiving the news in 2017 that her films were to be featured, nearly thirty-five years after they were produced: "It was very strange, not to say a bit destabilizing. Suddenly... I was catapulted forward, backward and sideways in time. I was an artist, and I use that word loosely, who had never really been discovered — I'm speaking solely of critics and the media, the people who have the power to make or break one's career — yet was now being re-discovered."

Richard Brody called Killing Time "very simply, one of the best short films that I've ever seen." Melissa Anderson of the Village Voice praised Woods's film Fannie's Film: "she makes the mundane facts of Drayton's life indelible." Hyperallergic writes that Woods gives otherwise invisible women like Drayton a platform and calls the documentary "extraordinary." The New York Times wrote that Woods "humorously yet movingly contemplates existence" in Killing Time.

In 2019, Killing Time and Fannie's Film were screened at a film festival of the Institut Jean Vigo at the Cinémathèque de Perpignan in France. That same year, both films were featured at the Courtisane Film Festival in Ghent, Belgium, as part of the series "Breaking Sacred Ground: African-American Independent Filmmaking on the US East Coast, 1967-1989. In November 2019, Woods' films were featured during the 41st edition of the Festival des 3 Continents in Nantes, France. In June, 2021, Killing Time and Fannie’s Film were screened by Royal Cine Cineclube in Lisbon.

In an essay published online in June 2021, Woods humorously reflects on her time as a filmmaker and the late recognition of her work: "When I was a confused, ambitious, younger woman embarking on my filmmaking career, I went to a psychic who I was hoping would tell me "one day you're going to be a famous filmmaker." Alas, there was no mention of filmmaking, let alone fame, I had to content myself with "yours will not be just any old name in the phone book." At the time I was disappointed, not to say terribly disappointed with his lackluster prediction. As it turns out, he was right, and now I'm thinking this late recognition is good enough for me. 19,979,520 feet from stardom is not such a bad place to be."
