= Killing Time (1979 film) =

Short film by Fronza Woods

- Title card
- Directed by: Fronza Woods
- Written by: Fronza Woods
- Starring: Fronza Woods
- Cinematography: Bruce McIntosh; Steven Wasserstein
- Production company: Women's Interart Center
- Release date: 1979
- Running time: 9 minutes
- Country: United States
- Language: English

Killing Time is a 1979 American short black comedy film written and directed by Fronza Woods, who also stars in the film under the pseudonym Sage Brush, and produced by the Women's Interart Center.

== Summary ==
The film follows a woman with suicidal ideation who struggles to attempt suicide because she is concerned about her appearance.

== Release ==
Killing Time was screened in Los Angeles, California, in June 1981, as part of a program titled "Nu Mooveez". In September 1983, the film screened at the 8th Street Playhouse in New York City, New York, as part of the Women's International Film Festival.

== Reception and legacy ==
In 2017, Richard Brody of The New Yorker called Killing Time "very simply, one of the best short films that I've ever seen", praising the voiceover narration as both "sharply comedic" and "deeply moving". In response to Brody's review, Woods stated: "The most beautiful, thoughtful, understanding and generous analysis being Richard Brody's review of the series in his The Front Row column for the New Yorker. I was touched and stunned that he was able to empathize so deeply with the plight of black women filmmakers of that era."

In 2017, BAM Cinématek in New York City included both Killing Time and another film by Woods, the short documentary Fannie's Film (1981), in an exhibition of works by black women filmmakers. In 2021, Woods described receiving the news in 2017 that her films were to be featured: "It was very strange, not to say a bit destabilizing. Suddenly [...] I was catapulted forward, backward and sideways in time. I was an artist, and I use that word loosely, who had never really been discovered—I'm speaking solely of critics and the media, the people who have the power to make or break one's career—yet was now being re-discovered."
