= Last Night at the Alamo =

- Directed by: Eagle Pennell
- Written by: Kim Henkel
- Produced by: Kim Henkel; Eagle Pennell
- Starring: Sonny Carl Davis; Lou Perryman
- Cinematography: Eric Alan Edwards; Brian Huberman
- Edited by: Kim Henkel; Eagle Pennell
- Music by: Chuck Pinnell; Wayne Bell
- Distributed by: Cinecom Pictures
- Release date: October 3, 1983
- Running time: 81 minutes
- Country: United States
- Language: English

Last Night at the Alamo is a 1983 American black-and-white independent film directed and co-produced by Eagle Pennell, written and co-produced by Kim Henkel and starring Sonny Carl Davis and Lou Perryman.

== Plot ==
"The Alamo" is a dive bar in Houston, Texas. On the eve of its demolition, the regular patrons gather to reminisce and discuss the future. In the opening scene, Ichabod (Steven Mattila), a cranky, young exterminator, arrives at the Alamo wanting to have a good time with his long-suffering girlfriend Mary to whom he is both physically and verbally abusive. Also arriving is Claude (Perryman), another blue-collared regular who is angry and distraught over being kicked out of his own house by his wife who is said to be unable to stand his crude lifestyle. Cowboy Regan (Davis) arrives after having not been seen for several days and, after reminiscing with his bar friends, tries a last-ditch effort to save the place by contacting his former college roommate who is now a powerful politician in the state capital of Austin.

As the afternoon wears on into the evening and night, several of the patrons leave one by one to either go home or to another bar a few miles away called the B&B which Cowboy loathes because it is regarded as a "Yankee bar" due to the upscale establishment and because the beer and other drinks are more expensive. Cowboy in the meantime commands the Alamo with his presence by telling anecdotes about his life which includes his recently quitting his job and wanting to go into the "movie business" as an actor. He partakes in a tequila drinking contest, gives Ichabod some money as he wants to take Mary to a nearby motel for the night, and even permits Claude to stay at his place for the night when Claude's attempts to reconcile with his estranged wife over the telephone fail.

Late in the evening, when Cowboy's friend finally manages to call him back only to inform him that he could not do enough to save the Alamo from closing for good, Cowboy is mocked by a few of the patrons, mostly a former high-school bully named Steve. Cowboy gets more drunk and starts a barroom brawl with Steve which leads to the barman kicking them both out of the bar and closing it up a half-hour early. Outside the bar, as Cowboy sorrowfully compares the end of his hangout place to the end of the redneck way of life, Claude offers to drive him home and Cowboy agrees as they watch the neon lights of the Alamo shut down for good.

Book ending the film is another appearance of Ichabod and Mary who arrive outside the now-closed Alamo bar arguing as they had been in the opening scene about both of them getting thrown out of the motel they were at due to Ichabod's drunken antics. The argument leads to Mary finally breaking up with Ichabod and driving away in his pickup truck with him angrily running after her on foot as a few of the Alamo patrons laugh and cheer him on.

== Production ==
Pennell received a $25,000 grant from the National Endowment for the Arts. The Southwest Alternate Media Project in Houston provided free office space and film equipment. Production began in May 1982 at an old bar, called the Old Barn, in East Houston and lasted for three and one-half weeks. The bar where the film was shot was still in business so daily shooting had to finish by 4 p.m. It is believed that Henkel finished the film as Pennell was having issues with alcohol and drugs and quit showing up.

== Release ==
The film was shown at the New York Film Festival in October 1983 and received mostly good reviews. The movie then played the USA Film Festival in 1984. It won the Special Jury Prize: Dramatic at the January 1984 Sundance Film Festival. Last Night at the Alamo started distribution in a limited commercial release in July 1984. It was released on VHS by the defunct home video company Continental Video in the mid-1980s. It as of yet has not received a DVD or Blu-ray release.

== Restoration ==
In March 2016, Last Night at the Alamo's official restoration premiered in Austin, TX at the annual South by Southwest (SXSW) film festival. This restoration, produced by Louis Black Productions, Watchmaker Films London, and IFC, premiered to sold-out audiences and rave reviews. In 2017, Louis Black Productions plans on releasing the film onto a comprehensive DVD/Blu-ray disc, distributed by the University of Texas Press.
