= Robert Kramer =

American film director (1939–1999)

- Born: June 22, 1939; New York City, United States
- Died: November 10, 1999 (aged 60); Haute-Normandie, France
- Occupations: Film director; screenwriter; actor
- Years active: 1965–1999

Robert Kramer (June 22, 1939 – November 10, 1999) was an American film director, screenwriter, and actor who directed 19 films between 1965 and 1999, most of them political cinema made from a left-wing point of view. Born in New York and educated at Swarthmore College and Stanford University, Kramer was a founding member of the filmmaking collective The Newsreel, established in New York City in 1968. Kramer wrote, directed and starred in the 1970 thriller film Ice, and co-directed the 1975 film Milestones with John Douglas. After relocating to Europe in 1979, Kramer directed the 1982 French film À toute allure, which was entered into the 1982 Cannes Film Festival.

In 1999, Kramer died of complications from meningitis in a hospital in Rouen, France. In a retrospective essay, academic David Fresko wrote that Kramer's "unwavering commitment to anti-imperialism, anti-capitalism, and anti-racism and antipathy for Hollywood (and corporate media more generally) dashed any hopes for his commercial integration into the culture industries", and noted that, in Europe, "he is considered second only to Jean-Luc Godard in the pantheon of political modernists."

== Filmography ==
- FALN (1965)
- In the Country (1967)
- The Edge (1968)
- The People's War (1970)
- Ice (1970)
- Milestones (1975)
- Scenes from the Class Struggle in Portugal (1977)
- Guns (1980)
- À toute allure (Full Speed, 1982)
- Notre nazi (Our Nazi, 1985)
- Diesel (1985)
- Doc's Kingdom (1987)
- X-Country (pronounced "cross-country") (1987)
- Route One USA (1989)
- Contre l'oubli (Against Oblivion, collective, 1991)
- Point de départ (Starting Place, 1994)
- Le manteau (The Coat, 1996)
- Walk the Walk (1996)
- The Ghosts of Electricity (1997)
- Cités de la plaine (Flat Land Cities, 2001)

== See also ==
- Guerrilla filmmaking
