= Ice (1970 film) =

American film by Robert Kramer

- Theatrical release poster
- Directed by: Robert Kramer
- Written by: Robert Kramer
- Produced by: Barbara Stone; David Stone
- Starring: Robert Kramer; Leo Braudy
- Cinematography: Robert Machover
- Release date: 1970
- Running time: 130 minutes
- Country: United States
- Language: English

Ice is a 1970 American thriller film written, directed by and starring Robert Kramer.

== Plot ==
The 16mm-shot film explores an underground revolutionary group that carries out urban guerrilla attacks against a fictionalized fascist regime in the United States, while struggling against internal strife. This is intermixed with sequences that explain the philosophy of radical action and play down the melodrama inherent in the thriller genre.

== Cast ==
- Robert Kramer as Robert
- Leo Braudy as Vladimir

== Style and themes ==
Author Andrew Nette wrote that, though Ice can be classified as belonging to the thriller genre, its "depiction of a simultaneously run-down and modern New York, governed by a largely unseen but powerful surveillance state, gives it a science-fiction tone and aesthetic." Nette draws comparisons between Ice and the Jean-Luc Godard-directed films Alphaville (1965) and La Chinoise (1967), as well as the 1928 Soviet film October: Ten Days That Shook the World.

According to English film critic George Melly, Ice presents such questions as, "[At what point] does the liberal decide that violent action is justified in fighting the State? How much oppression would be needed to turn us into Weathermen or enlist us in the Angry Brigade?"

== Reception ==
Vincent Canby of The New York Times called Ice "a very long (132 minutes), very intense, very self-satisfied movie that is also a curiously moving experience," concluding: "It is an awfully proud and humorless film, and although I can't say that I really like it, I do admire it, and I'd recommend it to anyone interested in politics or movies." Author Alan Rosenthal criticized Ice for what he characterized as "naive emotional reasoning", writing that the film "substitutes dogmatic assertion in place of hard political argument." Melly, in his review of the film for The Observer, wrote that, "although a thoughtful and indeed thought-provoking film, I couldn't really believe in it. The young revolutionaries were, as they say in the underground, 'beautiful,' but they offered little but slogans and gestures as an alternative to the status quo. The film showed up that terrible poverty of language which, in my view, is the flaw in current revolutionary practice. Ideas need words, more words than 'wow,' 'heavy' and 'too much.' There is the necessity to communicate if you are to convince. Idealism and violence are not in themselves enough."

Avant-garde filmmaker Jonas Mekas called it "the most original and significant American narrative film of the late sixties/early seventies".

== See also ==
- List of American films of 1970
- Counterculture of the 1960s
