= Eagle Pennell =

American independent filmmaker

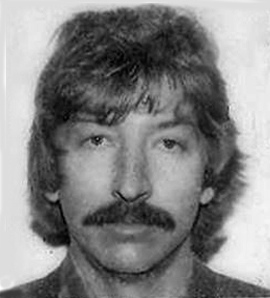
- Berlin International Film Festival, 1984
- Born: Glenn Irwin Pinnell; July 28, 1952; Andrews, Texas
- Died: 20 July 2002 (aged 49); Houston, Texas
- Occupation: Film director
- Years active: 1975 - 2002
- Notable work: The Whole Shootin' Match; Last Night at the Alamo

Eagle Pennell (28 July 1952 – 20 July 2002) was an American independent filmmaker. His film The Whole Shootin' Match (1978) is often credited with inspiring Robert Redford to start the Sundance Institute.

== Early life ==
Born Glenn Irwin Pinnell in Andrews, Texas, Pennell grew up in Lubbock and College Station, where his father Charles taught engineering at Texas A & M University. He became interested in film as a teenager and would use his father's Super 8 camera to shoot skits starring his brother and sisters. He graduated from A&M Consolidated High School. Pennell then attended the University of Texas at Austin majoring in Radio-Television-Film but dropped out in 1973 during his junior year to do film work. His first job was with a firm that produced highlight films of Southwest Conference football games. In his spare time, he used the company's equipment to work on his own projects.

He changed his name while in his early twenties. His first name is supposedly based on the story that Pennell was once told his large nose looked like the beak of an eagle. His last name comes from 2nd Lt. Ross Pennell, a character from John Ford's She Wore a Yellow Ribbon (1949). Ford was one of his father's favorite directors.

== Career ==
Pennell's first film, a short documentary titled Rodeo Cowboys, chronicled a rodeo school near Lake Travis outside of Austin. He co-organized Austin's first film festival in April 1975. He made his first narrative short, A Hell of a Note, in 1977. The short inspired his most notable film, The Whole Shootin' Match. He enlisted the help of Austin writer Lin Sutherland to get it written and produced. It is a tale of two lifelong friends, and would-be entrepreneurs, chasing one get-rich-quick scheme after another. The Whole Shootin' Match won seven awards and inspired Robert Redford to start Sundance.

In the early 1980s, Pennell moved to Houston, where he produced and directed his second feature film Last Night at the Alamo (1984). The story, co-written with screenwriter Kim Henkel, follows a group of friends gathering at a soon-to-be-demolished bar for the last time. The movie was well received, garnering praise at the New York Film Festival and the Telluride Film Festival in Colorado. Film critics Vincent Canby, Stanley Kauffmann and Roger Ebert also gave the movie rave reviews.

In 1989, Pennell directed Ice House, starring Melissa Gilbert, for Upfront Films. With grant money, Pennell completed two more independent projects during the 1990s, Heart Full of Soul and Doc's Full Service (his final film), which had its world première at the SXSW Film Festival in 1994. Both films are regarded as failures.

At the time of his death, Pennell had a grant from the Independent Television Service to develop a script based on his treatment My Dog Bit Elvis.

== Personal life ==
Pennell struggled with alcoholism and drug addiction for much of his adult life. For years before his death, he was intermittently homeless and often borrowed or begged for money. Pennell died in Houston, eight days short of his 50th birthday. He is buried in College Station Cemetery.

== Filmography ==
- Hell of a Note (Short) (1977)
- The Whole Shootin' Match (1978)
- Last Night at the Alamo (1983)
- Ice House (1989)
- Heart Full of Soul (1990)
- City Life (Documentary anthology) (1990)
- Doc's Full Service (1994)

Pennell is the subject of The King of Texas, a documentary that debuted at SXSW 2008. Directed by Claire Huie and René Pinnell (Pennell's nephew), the film was scored by Pennell's brother, Chuck. The documentary tells the story of Pennell's rise, fall, and tragic death, through interviews with family, friends, collaborators, and admirers.

The original King of Texas was a film Pennell wanted to make - a low-budget Western he planned to shoot near Brackettville on the set of John Wayne's version of The Alamo (1960).
