= Lynn Hershman Leeson filmography =

American new media artist Lynn Hershman Leeson has created a number of feature-length films, short films, and documentaries as part of her practice.

== Filmography ==
Short film

Year	Title	Notes	Ref.
1990	Desire Inc.	Also editor	
1991	Conspiracy of Silence		
1993	Cut Piece: A Video Homage to Yoko Ono	Recreates Yoko Ono's work Cut Piece 1964	
1994	Seduction of a Cyborg		
1995	Double Cross Click Click		
2017	VertiGhost	Also writer and editor	
2019	Shadow Stalker		
2019	30/30 Vision: 3 Decades of Strand Releasing	(segment "Lynn hershman Leeson")	

Feature film

Year	Title	Director	Writer	Producer	Notes	Ref.
1991	Seeing is Believing	Yes	No	No		
1992	Shooting Script: A Transatlantic Love Story	Yes	No	No	Co-directed with Knud Vesterskov and Ulrik Al Brask	
1993	Virtual Love	Yes	Yes	No	Also editor	
1994	Twists of the Cord (or)... Other Extensions of the Telephone	Yes	No	No		
1997	Conceiving Ada	Yes	Yes	Yes	Also production designer and actress	
2002	Teknolust	Yes	Yes	Yes		

Documentary film

Year	Title	Director	Producer	Editor	Notes	Ref.
1993	Changing Worlds: Women, Art and Revolution	Yes	No	No	Featuring footage and interviews with contemporary women artists	
2007	Strange Culture	Yes	Yes	Yes	Also writer	
2010	!Women Art Revolution	Yes	Yes	Yes		
2017	Tania Libre	Yes	Yes	Yes	About Tania Bruguera	
