= Hiro Narita =

Japanese-American cinematographer (born 1941)

Hiro Narita ASC
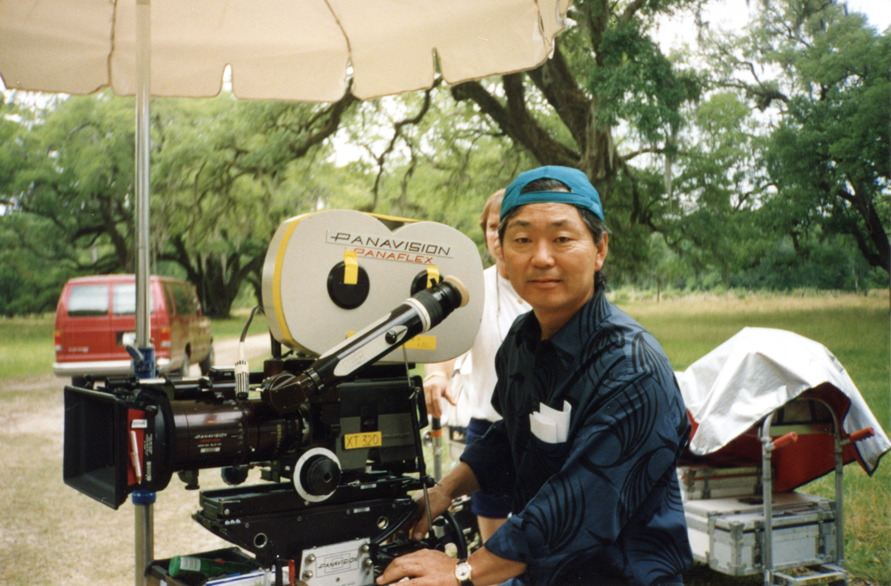
- Narita in 2008
- Born: Hiro Morikawa; June 26, 1941 (age 85); Keijō, Chōsen (now Seoul, South Korea)
- Citizenship: United States
- Education: San Francisco Art Institute (B.A., 1964)
- Years active: 1968–2020

Japanese name
- Kanji: 成田広
- Hiragana: なりた ひろ
- Katakana: ナリタ ヒロ
Transcriptions
- Romanization: Narita Hiro

Alternative Japanese name
- Kanji: 森川広
- Hiragana: もりかわ ひろ
- Katakana: モリカワ ヒロ
Transcriptions
- Romanization: Morikawa Hiro

Hiro Narita, ASC (成田広, Narita Hiro; né Morikawa; born June 26, 1941) is an American retired cinematographer. He is a three-time Primetime Emmy Award nominee.

== Early life and education ==
Narita was born to Japanese parents in 1941, in what is now Seoul, South Korea, then part of the Empire of Japan. In 1945, after the end of World War II, he and his family moved to Nara, Japan, and later to Tokyo. Following his father's early death and his mother's remarriage to a Japanese American, he immigrated in 1957 to Honolulu, Hawaii where he graduated from Kaimuki High School.

He went on to the San Francisco Art Institute where he received a BFA in Graphic Design in 1964. He quickly landed a position at a prominent local design firm, but the job lasted barely six months before he was drafted into the U.S. Army. For two years, he served as a designer and photographer at the Pentagon.

== Career ==
An avid movie fan since childhood, Narita decided to go into filmmaking rather than go back into graphic design upon his return to San Francisco in the mid-sixties. He was a still photographer on Michelangelo Antonioni's Zabriskie Point (1970). After an internship with John Korty and Victor J. Kemper on the Michael Ritchie movie The Candidate in 1971, he photographed the television movie Farewell to Manzanar in 1975, for which he received an Emmy Award nomination.

In 1976, he was one of the camera operators on Martin Scorsese's documentary The Last Waltz about the last concert of The Band. Later, he worked on projects like Apocalypse Now, More American Graffiti, and the Neil Young documentary Rust Never Sleeps. He shot additional photography for Return of the Jedi (1983), "the film was near completion and [Richard Marquand] needed some additional shots to thread the story. We went to Death Valley, not far from the Zabriskie Point location, to film a glass plate and other cutaways in which R2-D2 and C-3PO travel to Jabba Palace."

For his cinematography on the movie Never Cry Wolf he won the Boston Society of Film Critics Award and the National Society of Film Critics Award in 1983. In 1989, he photographed the Visual Effects in the Steven Spielberg film Always. In the following years, he was the Director of Photography on successful films like Honey, I Shrunk the Kids, Star Trek VI: The Undiscovered Country, Dirty Pictures, The Rocketeer, and James and the Giant Peach.

Narita served as director of photography on the 1997 Live Action Short Film Academy Award winning Visas and Virtue. He also directed the 1997 hour-long documentary film, Isamu Noguchi: Stones and Paper, for PBS' American Masters series.

He has taught at San Francisco Art Institute, lectured, and given master classes at many institutions including Golden Eye in the Republic of Georgia.

He is a member of American Society of Cinematographers (ASC) and Academy of Motion Picture Arts and Sciences.

== Filmography ==
=== Film ===
Feature films

Year	Title	Director	Notes
1983	Return of the Jedi	Richard Marquand	Additional photography
1983	Never Cry Wolf	Carroll Ballard	
1984	Indiana Jones and the Temple of Doom	Steven Spielberg	Additional photography
1984	Prince Jack	Bert Lovitt	
1985	Sylvester	Tim Hunter	
1986	Fire with Fire	Duncan Gibbins	
1986	Nutcracker: The Motion Picture	Carroll Ballard	Second unit photography
1987	No Man's Land	Peter Werner	
1989	Shuttlecock	Jerry Barrish	
1989	Always	Steven Spielberg	Visual effects photography
1989	Honey, I Shrunk the Kids	Joe Johnston	
1991	The Rocketeer	Joe Johnston	
1991	Star Trek VI: The Undiscovered Country	Nicholas Meyer	
1993	Gunmen	Deran Sarafian	
1993	Hocus Pocus	Kenny Ortega	
1994	White Fang 2: Myth of the White Wolf	Ken Olin	
1996	The Arrival	David Twohy	
1996	James and the Giant Peach	Henry Selick	Live-action scenes
1997	Conceiving Ada	Lynn Hershman Leeson	
1998	Shadrach	Susanna Styron	
1998	Simon Birch	Mark Steven Johnson	Second unit photography
1998	I'll Be Home for Christmas	Arlene Sanford	
2000	Fortress 2: Re-Entry	Geoff Murphy	
2002	The Time Machine	Simon Wells	Second unit photography
2002	The Scorpion King	Chuck Russell	Second unit photography
2002	Teknolust	Lynn Hershman Leeson	
2003	Anger Management	Peter Segal	Second unit photography
2005	Night of Henna	Hassan Zee	
2006	The Darwin Awards	Finn Taylor	
2006	Valley of the Heart's Delight	Tim Boxell	
2009	La Mission	Peter Bratt	
2015	Love & Taxes	Jacob Kornbluth	
2020	Love Is Love Is Love	Eleanor Coppola	Segment: "Late Lunch"

Short films

Year	Title	Director	Notes
1982	listen....	Andy Aaron	
1997	Visas and Virtue	Chris Tashima	
2008	A Perfect Place	Derrick Scocchera	

Documentary films

Year	Title	Director	Notes
1978	The Last Waltz	Martin Scorsese	Additional photography
1979	Rust Never Sleeps	Neil Young	with Jon H. Else, Paul Goldsmith, Robbie Greenberg, L.A. Johnson, David Myers and Richard Pearce
1991	The Inland Sea	Lucille Carra	
2000	Dvorak and America	Lucille Carra	with Antonín Chundela and Allen Moore
2007	Strange Culture	Lynn Hershman Leeson	
2015	Tania Libre	Lynn Hershman Leeson	with Shane King

=== Television ===
Year	Title	Notes
1984-88	American Playhouse	3 episodes: "Solomon Northup's Odyssey", "Go Tell It on the Mountain", "Pigeon Feathers"
1986	The Wonderful World of Disney	Episode: "Time Flyer"
1992	Tales from the Crypt	Episode: "Showdown"
1997	American Masters	Episode: "Isamu Noguchi: Stones and Paper"
1999	Independent Lens	Episode: "Visas and Virtue"
2000	Gilmore Girls	Pilot episode

TV movies, miniseries, and specials

Year	Title	Director	Notes
1976	Farewell to Manzanar	John Korty	
1977	Nanette: An Aside	Rik van Glintenkamp	
1983	The Haunting Passion	John Korty	
1985	The Blue Yonder	Mark Rosman	
1987	Amerika	Donald Wrye	
1989	Mothers, Daughters and Lovers	Matthew Robbins	
1991	Plymouth	Lee David Zlotoff	
1991	Two-Fisted Tales	Richard Donner	Segment "Showdown"
1993	They	John Korty	
1994	Long Shadows	Sheldon Larry	
1997	Sub Down	Gregg Champion	
2000	Dirty Pictures	Frank Pierson	
2000	Half Past Autumn: The Life and Works of Gordon Parks	Craig Rice	Documentary; Additional photography
2001	Other People	Michael W. Watkins	

== Awards and nominations ==
Institution	Year	Category	Work	Result
Boston International Film Festival	2006	Best Cinematography	Valley of the Heart's Delight	Won
Boston Society of Film Critics	1984	Best Cinematography	Never Cry Wolf	Won
CableACE Awards	1987	Direction of Photography for a Special, Movie or Miniseries	The Blue Yonder	Won
Hawaiʻi International Film Festival	1984	Excellence in Cinematography	—N/a	Won
Los Angeles Film Critics Association	1983	Best Cinematography	Never Cry Wolf	2nd place
National Society of Film Critics	1984	Best Cinematography	Never Cry Wolf	Won
New York Film Critics Circle	1983	Best Cinematographer	Never Cry Wolf	3rd place
Primetime Emmy Awards	1976	Outstanding Cinematography for a Limited Series, Movie, or a Special	Farewell to Manzanar	Nominated
Primetime Emmy Awards	2000	Outstanding Cinematography for a Limited Series, Movie, or a Special	Dirty Pictures	Nominated
Primetime Emmy Awards	2001	Outstanding Cinematography for a Nonfiction Program	Half Past Autumn: The Life and Works of Gordon Parks	Nominated
