= Agent Ruby =

Interactive work by Lynn Hershman Leeson

Agent Ruby (1998–2002) by Lynn Hershman Leeson is an interactive, multiuser work using artificial intelligence.

== Description ==
On Agent Ruby's website, "Agent Ruby's Edream Portal," a female face moves her eyes and lips. Ruby, named from Hershman Leeson's own film, Teknolust, answers questions and often responds that she needs a better algorithm to answer questions not within her database. The work, created with AI, explores relationships between real and virtual worlds. Hershman Leeson had created an earlier version of Ruby, CyberRoberta, which was a custom-made doll with webcam eyes that interacted with the internet.

The work in a gallery provides a screen and a sign inviting gallery-goers to "Chat with Ruby."

== Artificial intelligence ==
In 2015 when Agent Ruby was exhibited at the gallery Modern Art Oxford, a review in Aesthetica Magazine described it as an artificial intelligence agent. A review in New Scientist noted that "Ruby is a fast learner, but perhaps not a natural conversationalist." A 2024 list of "25 Essential AI Artworks" published by ARTnews wrote that while "Agent Ruby's capabilities seem limited by today's standards," it was extensive for its day.

== Publications and exhibitions ==
Agent Ruby was commissioned and displayed at the San Francisco Museum of Modern Art, Modern Art Oxford, and the ZKM Center for Art and Media in Karlsruhe, Germany. The San Francisco Museum of Modern Art (SFMOMA) presented Lynn Hershman Leeson: The Agent Ruby Files, March 30 through June 2, 2013 which presented the project server's archive of user conversations over the 12 years of exhibitions.
