= Cotnoir =

Cotnoir is a surname. Notable people with the surname include:

- Benoit Cotnoir (born 1975), Canadian ice hockey player
- Brian Cotnoir, alchemist, artist and film-maker
- Louise Cotnoir (1948–2024), Canadian writer
