= Francesca Faridany =

American actress

- Occupation: Actress
- Years active: 1997–present
- Spouse: Stephen Wadsworth (m. 2002)

Francesca Faridany is a British-American actress. She is best known for her role as Fiona Clarke in the NBC television drama series Manifest (2018–2023).

== Career ==
Her acting career began in 1999, when she appeared in Guiding Light.

Her television appearances include FBI, Law & Order: Special Victims Unit, ER, Bull and Homeland.

She appeared as the museum director in the critically acclaimed 2018 Marvel Cinematic Universe superhero film Black Panther.

Faridany appeared as Fiona Clarke in the NBC drama series Manifest.

She also works in theater productions. In 2019, she, along with Kate Mulgrew, appeared in the play The Half-Life of Marie Curie, which played off-Broadway's Minetta Lane Theatre in the fall.

== Personal life ==
Faridany married the American writer and director, Stephen Wadsworth, in Garda, Italy in 2002.

== Filmography ==
=== Film ===
Year	Title	Role	Notes
1997	Conceiving Ada	Emmy Coer	
2017	Love After Love	Karen	
2018	Black Panther	Museum Director	
2026	Hershey	Veronica "Fanny" Hershey	Post-production

=== Television ===
Year	Title	Role	Notes
2004	ER	Carol Shoup-Sanders	Episode: "Twas the Night"
2009	Law & Order: Criminal Intent	Gail	Episode: "Revolution"
2016	Law & Order: Special Victims Unit	Claire Gilbert	Episode: "Fashionable Crimes"
2018	Homeland	Olivia	Episode: "Clarity"
2018–2019, 2022-2023	Manifest	Fiona Clarke	6 episodes
2018	FBI	Jennifer Hilton	Episode: "The Armorer's Faith"
2019	Bull	Rachel Elliot	Episode: "Into the Mystic"
