= Desire Inc. =

- Directed by: Lynn Hershman
- Release date: 1990
- Country: United States
- Language: English

Desire Inc. (1990) is a video documentary piece created by the artist Lynn Hershman (now known as Lynn Hershman Leeson). Hershman created a series of seductive television ads in which a sexy woman asked for viewers to call her. The ads, interviews with the respondents to the ad, and commentary from Hershman are woven together to create the 26-minute video. This is one of Hershman's significant works, and it demonstrates the viewers' intense personal relationship to the public space. It is a rare piece of video art that makes television interactive, where the response from a viewer is as much the art as the ad itself.

Hershman uses the form of the TV commercial, which usually just directs desire toward consumer objects, to direct viewers toward actual interpersonal connection instead.

== Memorable quotes ==
- "Mass communication is like mask communication"
- "This is the medium of seduction"
- "TV claimed the female body"
- Hershman calls the ads "electric, nomadic boomerangs"
