= Donald Richie =

American writer and film historian (1924–2013)

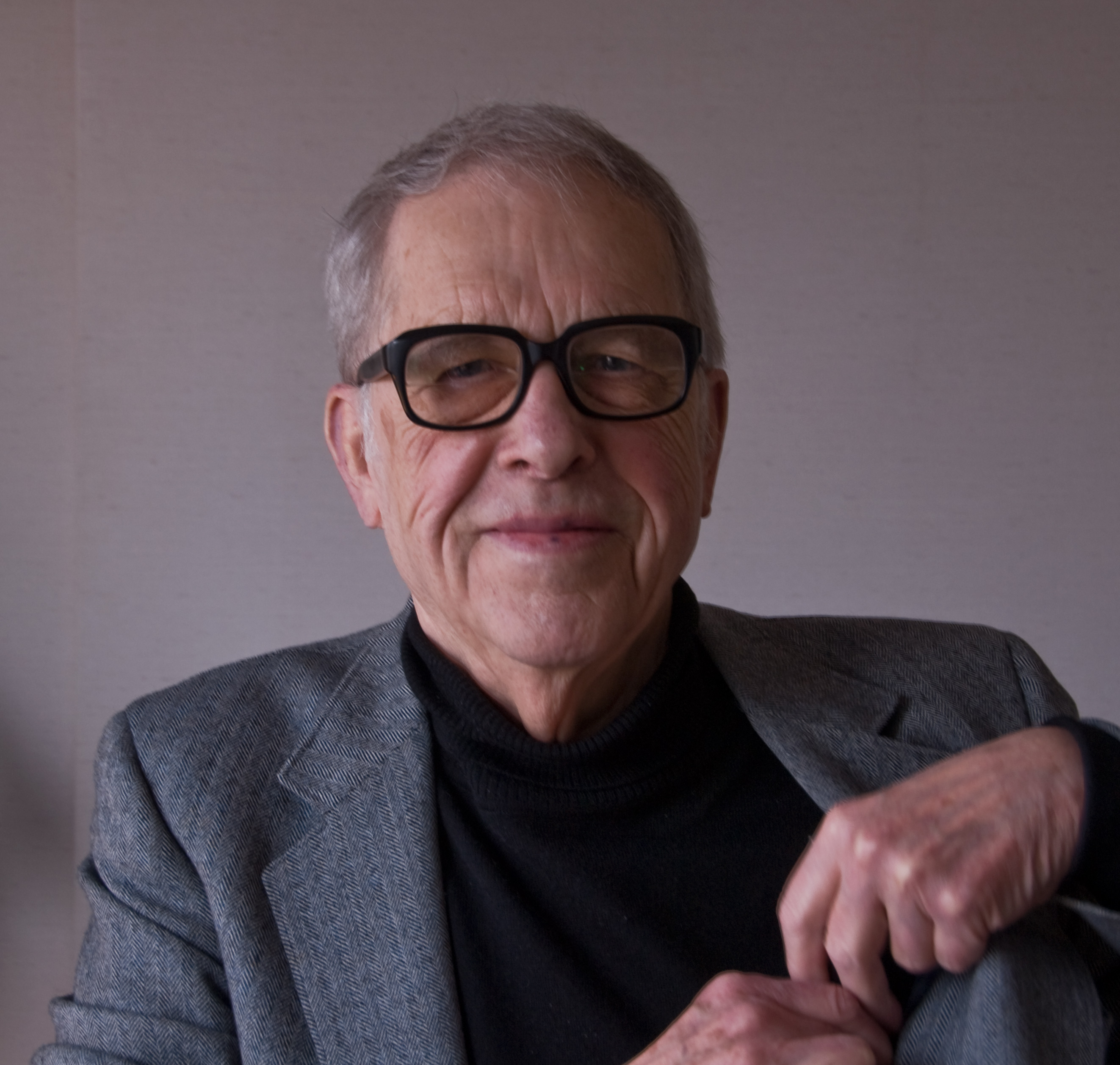
- Richie in February 2009
- Born: April 17, 1924; Lima, Ohio, U.S.
- Died: February 19, 2013 (aged 88); Tokyo, Japan
- Occupations: Author, journalist, film critic
- Known for: Writing on Japanese cinema

Donald Richie (April 17, 1924 – February 19, 2013) was an American author, journalist, and film critic. He was known for writing about the Japanese people, the culture of Japan, and especially Japanese cinema. Although he considered himself primarily a film historian, Richie also directed a number of experimental films, the first when he was 17. He was awarded the Japanese Order of the Rising Sun in 2005.

== Biography ==
Richie was born in Lima, Ohio. During World War II, he joined the United States Merchant Marine and served aboard Liberty ships as a purser and medical officer. By then he had already published his first work, "Tumblebugs" (1942), a short story.

In 1947, Richie first visited Japan with the American occupation force, a job he saw as an opportunity to escape from Lima, Ohio. He first worked as a typist, and then as a civilian staff writer for the Pacific Stars and Stripes. While in Tokyo, he became fascinated with Japanese culture. He was struck by the relative acceptance of gay men and women and by the beauty of Kabuki theater, in which a seventy-three year old man could transform himself into a nineteen year old woman. He was further attracted by Japanese cinema. He was soon writing movie reviews in the Stars and Stripes. In 1948 he met Kashiko Kawakita, who introduced him to Yasujirō Ozu. During their long friendship, Kawakita and Richie collaborated closely in promoting Japanese film in the West. He began composing contemporary music and released a title for ballet at that time.

After returning to the United States, he enrolled at Columbia University's School of General Studies in 1949 and received a B.S. degree in English in 1953. Richie then returned to Japan as film critic for The Japan Times and in 1959 published his first book, The Japanese Film: Art and Industry, coauthored with Joseph Anderson, which gave the first English language account of Japanese film. The greater tolerance in Japan for male homosexuality than in the United States was one reason he gave for returning to Japan, as he was openly bisexual. He spent much of the second half of the 20th century living and working alone in Tokyo, with the exception of a brief marriage to the American writer Mary Evans from 1961 to 1965. Richie served as Curator of Film at the New York Museum of Modern Art from 1969 to 1972.

He is credited with raising the awareness of several film festivals including the Hawaii International Film Festival, International Film Festival Rotterdam, San Francisco International Film Festival, Telluride Film Festival, and the Tokyo International Film Festival amongst others, serving as a juror and speaker. He served as a guest director at Telluride and has received awards from HIFF and SFIFF for his years of support.

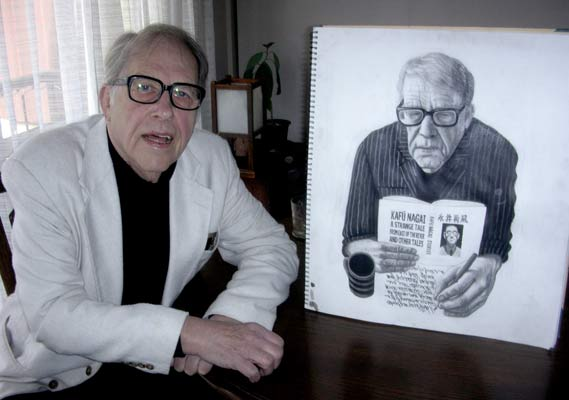
Donald Richie with portrait by Carl Randall, made at Richie's home in Ueno, Tokyo, 2006.

Richie was a prolific author. Among his most noted works on Japan are The Inland Sea, a travel classic, and Public People, Private People, a look at some of Japan's most significant and most mundane people. He has compiled two collections of essays on Japan: A Lateral View and Partial Views. A collection of his writings has been published to commemorate fifty years of writing about Japan: The Donald Richie Reader. The Japan Journals: 1947–2004 consists of extended excerpts from his diaries.

In 1991, film makers Lucille Carra and Brian Cotnoir produced a film version of The Inland Sea, which Richie narrated. Produced by Travelfilm Company, the film won numerous awards, including Best Documentary at the Hawaii International Film Festival (1991) and the Earthwatch Film Award. It screened at the Sundance Film Festival in 1992.

He was honored by his adopted home with a number of awards including being inducted as a member of the Order of the Rising Sun in 2005.

Author Tom Wolfe described Richie as "the Lafcadio Hearn of our time, a subtle, stylish, and deceptively lucid medium between two cultures that confuse one another: the Japanese and the American."

Although Richie spoke Japanese fluently, he could neither read nor write it proficiently.

Richie died, aged 88, on February 19, 2013, in Tokyo.

== Japanese cinema ==
Richie's most widely recognized accomplishments were his analyses of Japanese cinema. With each subsequent book, he focused less on film theory and more on the conditions in which the films were made. There was an emphasis on the "presentational" nature of Japan's cinema, in contrast to the "representational" films of the West. In the foreword to Richie's book A Hundred Years Of Japanese Film, Paul Schrader writes, "Whatever we in the West know about Japanese film, and how we know it, we most likely owe to Donald Richie." Richie also penned analyses of two of Japan's best known filmmakers: Yasujirō Ozu and Akira Kurosawa. Because Richie was a friend of Fumio Hayasaka, who composed music for the cinema, he first met Kurosawa on the set of Drunken Angel, the director's initial collaboration with Toshiro Mifune.

Richie wrote the English subtitles for Akira Kurosawa's films Throne of Blood (1957), Red Beard (1965), Kagemusha (1980) and Dreams (1990).

In the 21st century, Richie provided audio commentaries for The Criterion Collection on DVDs of various classic Japanese films, notably those of Ozu (A Story of Floating Weeds and Early Summer), Mikio Naruse (When a Woman Ascends the Stairs), and Kurosawa (Drunken Angel, Rashomon, The Lower Depths, and The Bad Sleep Well), among others.

An early supporter of the Hawaii International Film Festival, Richie has been recognized as introducing Roger Ebert to Japanese cinema through Richie's recommendation of Ebert to also serve with him on the festival jury.

== Books by Richie ==
- The Honorable Visitors. Charles E Tuttle; 1949; ISBN 0-8048-1941-6
- Essays in Contemporary American Literature, Drama and Cinema (in Japanese). Hayakawa Shobo. 1950.
- With Watanabe Miyoko. Six Kabuki Plays (paperback). Hokuseido Press; 1953; ISBN 1-299-15754-8
- This Scorching Earth. Charles E. Tuttle. 1956.
- Eight American Authors. Kenkyusha. 1956.
- Where Are the Victors? Tuttle Publishing. 1956. ISBN 978-0804815123.
- With Joseph L. Anderson. The Japanese Film: Art and Industry (paperback). Princeton University Press; 1959, revised 1983; ISBN 0-691-00792-6
- Japanese Movies. Japan Travel Bureau, 1961
- The Films of Akira Kurosawa. University of California Press, 1965. 3rd edition, expanded and updated, 1998. ISBN 978-0-520-22037-9
- The Japanese Movie. An Illustrated History (hardcover). Kodansha Ltd; 1965; ISBN 1-141-45003-8
- The masters' book of Ikebana: background and principles of Japanese flower arrangement, edited by Donald Richie & Meredith Weatherby; with lessons by the masters of Japan's three foremost schools: (hardcover). Bijutsu Shuppansha. 1966.
- Erotic Gods Phallicism in Japan (slipcase). Shufushinsha; 1966; ISBN 1-141-44743-6
- Companions of the Holiday (hardcover). Weatherhill; 1968; ISBN 1-299-58310-5
- George Stevens: An American Romantic. New York, The Museum of Modern Art, 1970.
- The Inland Sea (1st ed.). Weatherhill; 1971; ISBN 978-0834800632
- Words, Ideas, and Ambiguities: Four Perspectives on Translating from the Japanese (Chicago: Imprint Publications; Pacific Intercultural Studies 1, 2000 ISBN 187917636X).
- Ozu: His Life and Films (paperback). University of California Press. 1977. ISBN 978-0-520-03277-4.
- With Ian Buruma (photos) (1980). The Japanese Tattoo (hardcover). Weatherhill.
- Zen Inklings: Some Stories, Fables, Parables, and Sermons (Buddhism & Eastern Philosophy) (Paperback) with prints by the author. Weatherhill, 1982. Without prints: 1982. ISBN 9780834802308
- A Taste Of Japan (hardcover). 1985. Kodansha Intl. Ltd.
- Different People: Pictures of Some Japanese (hardcover). Kodansha Inc; 1987; ISBN 0-87011-820-X
- Focus on Rashomon (hardcover). Rutgers University Press; 1987; ISBN 0-13-752980-5
- Introducing Tokyo (hardcover). Kodansha Inc; 1987; ISBN 0-87011-806-4
- Introducing Japan (hardcover). Kodansha International; 1987; ISBN 0-87011-833-1
- Japanese Cinema: Film Style and National Character (paperback). Oxford University Press; 1990; ISBN 0-19-584950-7
- Japanese Cinema: An Introduction (hardcover). Oxford University Press; 1990; ISBN 0-19-584950-7
- A Lateral View: Essays on Culture and Style in Contemporary Japan (paperback). Stone Bridge Press. 1992. ISBN 978-0-9628137-4-0.
- The Temples of Kyoto (hardback). Tuttle Publishing; 1995; ISBN 0-8048-2032-5
- Partial Views: Essays on Contemporary Japan (paperback). Japan Times; 1995; ISBN 4-7890-0801-0
- Tokyo (paperback). Reaktion Books. 1999. ISBN 978-1-86189-034-4.
- Memoirs of the Warrior Kumagai: A Historical Novel (hardcover). Tuttle Publishing; 1999; ISBN 0-8048-2126-7
- Tokyo: A View of the City (paperback). Reaktion Books; 1999; ISBN 1-86189-034-6
- The Donald Richie Reader: 50 Years of Writing on Japan (paperback). Stone Bridge Press. 2001. ISBN 978-1-880656-61-7.
- The Inland Sea (paperback). Stone Bridge Press. 2002. ISBN 978-1-880656-69-3. and Stone Bridge Press; 2010; ISBN 1-880656-69-8
- With Roy Garner. The Image Factory: Fads and Fashions in Japan (paperback). Reaktion Books; 2003; ISBN 1-86189-153-9
- Japanese Literature Reviewed (hardcover). ICG Muse; 2003; ISBN 4-925080-78-4
- A View from the Chuo Line and Other Stories (paperback), Printed Matter Press, 2004, SBN 4900178276
- With Hillary Raphael, Meital Hershkovitz. Outcast Samurai Dancer, Creation Books, 2004, ISBN 978-1840680980
- The Japan Journals: 1947-2004 (paperback, Ed. Leza Lowitz). Stone Bridge Press. 2005. ISBN 978-1-880656-97-6.
- Paul Schrader (Introduction) (2005). A Hundred Years of Japanese Film: A Concise History, with a Selective Guide to DVDs and Videos. Kodansha International. ISBN 978-4-7700-2995-9. (paperback)
- Tokyo Nights (paperback). Printed Matter Press; 2005; ISBN 1-933606-00-2
- Japanese Portraits: Pictures of Different People (Tuttle Classics of Japanese Literature) (paperback). Tuttle Publishing. 2006. ISBN 978-0-8048-3772-9.
- A Tractate on Japanese Aesthetics (paperback). Stone Bridge Press. 2007. ISBN 978-1-933330-23-5.
- Stephen Mansfield (Introduction) (2007). Travels in the East (paperback). Stone Bridge Press. ISBN 978-1-933330-61-7.
- Botandoro: Stories, Fables, Parables and Allegories: A Miscellany (paperback), Printed Matter Press; 2008; ISBN 978-1-933606-16-3

== Films, books and papers on Richie ==
- Sneaking In. Donald Richie's Life in Film. Directed by Brigitte Prinzgau-Podgorschek, Navigator Film Produktion/Peter Stockhaus Filmproduktion, GmbH, Vienna, 2002
- Silva, Arturo, ed. (2001). The Donald Richie Reader. Berkeley: Stone Bridge Press. ISBN 978-1-880656-61-7 (cloth)
- Klaus Volkmer and Olaf Möller.Ricercar fuer Donald Richie. Taschenbuch (1997)

== Films by Richie ==
Richie was the author of about 30 experimental films, from five to 47 minutes long, six of which have been published on DVD as A Donald Richie Film Anthology (Japan, 2004). None were originally meant for public screening. The pieces on the DVD, all originally shot in 16 mm, are:

- Wargames (1962), 22 minutes
- Atami Blues (1962), 20 minutes, soundtrack by Tōru Takemitsu
- Boy With Cat (1967), 5 minutes
- Dead Youth (1967), 13 minutes
- Five Philosophical Fables (1967), 47 minutes
- Cybele (1968), 20 minutes

Among the short works not included in the collection are for example Small Town Sunday (1941, 8 mm), filmed when he was still resident in the United States, A Sentimental Education (1953), Aoyama Kaidan (1957), Shu-e (1958), and Life (1965).

Other films:

- The Inland Sea (1991), Screenplay, narration
- Akira Kurosawa (1975), 58 minutes, 35 mm in color and b/w. Produced by Atelier 41 for NTV, Tokyo
- A Doll (1968) 16 mm, 20 minutes, in color
- A Couple (1968), 35 mm, in b/w
- Nozoki Monogatari (1967), 16 mm, released by Brandon Films
- Khajuraho (1968), 16 mm, in color and b/w

== Honors ==
- National Society of Film Critics Awards, USA: Special Award (1971)
- Kawakita Award, first recipient in 1983
- Special Prize, Hawaii International Film Festival, 1986
- Presidential Citation, New York University, 1989
- Mel Novikoff Award, San Francisco International Film Festival, 1990
- Tokyo Metropolitan Government Cultural Award, 1993
- John D. Rockefeller 3rd Award (Asian Cultural Council) in 1993
- Japan Foundation Award, Japan Foundation, 1995.
- Japan Society Award, Japan Society New York, 2001
- Honorary Doctorate, University of Maryland, 1999
- Honorary Doctorate, Bard College, 2004
- Order of the Rising Sun, Japan, 2005
- Honorary Doctorate, Temple University, 2007

== Reference and further reading ==
- Prideaux, Eric (September 1, 2002). "Films, Zen, Japan/Close-up: Donald Richie".
- Silva, Arturo, ed. (2001). The Donald Richie Reader. Berkeley: Stone Bridge Press. ISBN 978-1-880656-61-7 (cloth)
- Carland-Echavarria, Patrick (2025), "'In Ohio, Men Do Not Turn into Young Girls': Queer Exiles and Utopian Imaginaries in Occupation Japan", Journal of American-East Asian Relations, 32 (1): 37–61, doi:10.1163/18765610-32010004
