= Dawn L. Hershman =

American oncologist

Dawn Hershman
- Spouse: Richard Hankin (m. 1991)
- Relatives: Lynn Hershman Leeson (mother)

Academic background
- Education: BA, psychology, 1987, University of California, Los Angeles; MD, 1994, Albert Einstein College of Medicine

Dawn Luryn Hershman is an American oncologist. Since 2020, she has served as the American Cancer Society Professor of Medicine and Epidemiology at Columbia University.

== Early life and education ==
Hershman was born to artists Lynn Hershman Leeson and George Leeson. She completed her undergraduate degree in psychology from the University of California, Los Angeles and earned her medical degree in 1994 from Albert Einstein College of Medicine. While completing her residency and fellowship at NewYork-Presbyterian Hospital, she was appointed chief resident from 1997 to 1998.

== Career ==
Following her post-doctoral work, Hershman joined the faculty at Columbia University Mailman School of Public Health in 2001. As an assistant professor of Epidemiology, Hershman co-developed a gene test to measure the activity and aggressiveness of over 70 genes found in tumor cells. She was also the recipient of the 2007 Advanced Clinical Research Award from the American Society of Clinical Oncology. Following this, Hershman was recognized by the Breast Cancer Research Foundation for her innovative clinical and translational breast cancer research. In 2015, Hershman was elected a member of the American Society for Clinical Investigation.

As a result of her "leading work in improving cancer care delivery and cancer health outcomes, particularly in breast cancer," Hershman was appointed the American Cancer Society Professor of Medicine and Epidemiology in 2020. She was also named the recipient of the 2020 Hologic, Inc. Endowed Women Who Conquer Cancer Mentorship Award. The following year, Hershman was recognized as a Giant of Cancer Care by Onclive as her work had a "demonstrable and lasting impact on improving quality of life for people with cancer and reducing barriers for patients to receive cancer care." She was also the co-recipient of the 2021 Real-World Data Impact Award from the American Cancer Society for her research investigating the toxicity and efficacy of oral antineoplastic drugs and identifying disparities in care.

== Personal life ==
Hershman married her fiancée Richard Hankin in a Jewish ceremony in 1991. Following their marriage, they had two children together.
