= Josh Kornbluth =

American dramatist (born 1959)

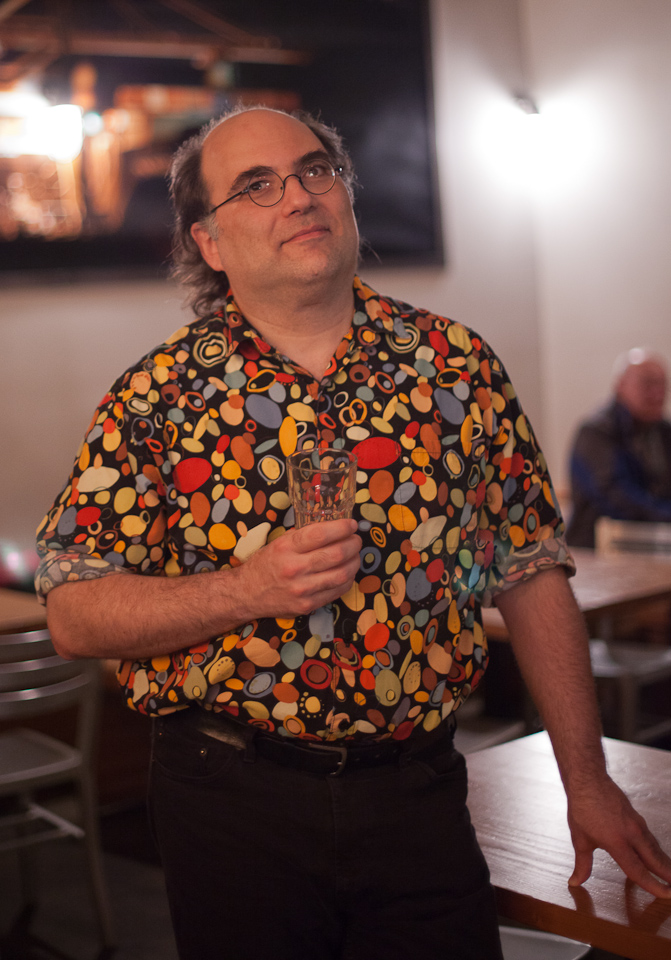
- Kornbluth at Starbucks in San Francisco
- Born: May 21, 1959 (age 67); Roslyn, New York
- Occupations: Monologist, actor
- Years active: 1989–present
- Spouse: Sara Sato
- Children: 1
- Website: http://joshkornbluth.com/

Josh Kornbluth (born May 21, 1959) is an American comedic autobiographical monologist based in the San Francisco Bay Area who has toured internationally, written and starred in several feature films, and starred in a television interview show.

== Early life and education ==
Kornbluth was born in 1959 to mother "Bunny" and father Paul, the oldest of four children. Raised in New York City, he briefly attended Princeton University but dropped out, never completing his undergraduate degree.

== Career ==
=== Overview ===
Kornbluth's live and filmed works are almost entirely solo monologues based closely on events and people his life, his upbringing, and his career. As such he is among a small group of artists that includes Eric Bogosian, Lily Tomlin, and Spalding Gray.

Most of Kornbluth's monologues relate to personal and societal ethics, self-fulfillment, and the role of the individual in society, drawing a connection between his own personal foibles and larger issues of citizenship. Playing a hapless, sincere, and sometimes buffoonish everyman caught up in world events, he demonstrates the relevance of these concepts to daily life. His live performances occasionally include a question-and-answer session with academic lawyers or other experts and scholars. Despite the serious messages and somewhat dry themes his works are all lighthearted and highly humorous.

=== Works ===
Major filmed work includes:

- Haiku Tunnel - his experience as an inept legal assistant
- Red Diaper Baby - an affectionate account of growing up Communist in America
- Strange Culture - a documentary on the bizarre case against Steve Kurtz

Live monologues and other staged works include:

- The Mathematics of Change - describes how despite a love for mathematics he "hit the wall" in his freshman classes at Princeton; draws parallels between calculus and life
- Mr. Smith Goes to Obscuristan - a San Francisco Mime Troupe show (co-author)
- Ben Franklin Unplugged - describes how in the course of researching the personal and public life of Ben Franklin, he realizes that his affinity with Franklin goes far beyond their obvious physical resemblance
- Love and Taxes - revisits the events of Haiku Tunnel, the royalties from which he did not report to the IRS for years despite working for a well-known tax lawyer; explores the meaning of the tax system and necessity to pay income tax, as well as events surrounding his marriage. In 2004 a judge at the United States Tax Court called Kornbluth to say he had cited a pivotal scene from the monologue in which a former Commissioner of Internal Revenue calls Kornbluth the Yiddish invective "pisher" for not paying his taxes, in a judicial opinion he had just completed, the first known instance of the word in American jurisprudence. Kornbluth and his brother released a film version of the monologue in 2015.
- Citizen Josh - in which he completes his final requirement for an undergraduate degree by writing a monologue about the role of civility in public debate
- Andy Warhol: Good for the Jews? - a monologue commissioned by the Contemporary Jewish Museum of San Francisco, about the exhibit Warhol’s Jews: A Retrospective.
- Sea of Reeds - a play with musical accompaniment about Kornbluth's preparations for having a bar mitzvah at the age of 52, and his learning to play the oboe.

=== The Josh Kornbluth Show ===
Kornbluth hosted a television talk show,The Josh Kornbluth Show, for two seasons (2005–2007) on KQED 9, San Francisco. Guests included Alan Alda, Rita Moreno, and Amy Sedaris. The show often included a "man on the street" segment, "Wandering Josh".

=== Citizen Brain ===
In 2017, Kornbluth served as an Atlantic Fellow with the Global Brain Health Institute at the UCSF Memory and Aging Center. For this fellowship, he created and hosted a video series, "Citizen Brain", in which he and neuroscientists discuss brain science in connection with topics including empathy, ageism, and social justice. In 2020, Kornbluth created a new solo show, also titled "Citizen Brain", based on these topics.

== Personal life ==
Kornbluth worked as a copyeditor in New York before moving to San Francisco in 1987. He is married to wife Sara Sato, with whom he has a son, Guthrie.

Since 2012, Kornbluth has participated in the annual Team in Training endurance bike ride, a fundraiser for the Leukemia & Lymphoma Society. In 2014, Kornbluth served as the inaugural artist in residence for the Zen Hospice Project in San Francisco.
