= The Inland Sea =

1991 American documentary film

- Blu-ray cover art for the Criterion Collection release
- Directed by: Lucille Carra
- Written by: Donald Richie
- Based on: The Inland Sea by Donald Richie
- Produced by: Brian Cotnoir; Lucille Carra
- Narrated by: Donald Richie
- Cinematography: Hiro Narita
- Edited by: Brian Cotnoir
- Music by: Toru Takemitsu
- Production company: Travelfilm Company
- Release date: November 1991
- Running time: 56 minutes
- Countries: United States; Japan
- Language: English

The Inland Sea is a 1991 American travel documentary directed by Lucille Carra. It is inspired by the 1971 travelogue of the same title written by Donald Richie. In the documentary, filmmaker Carra undertakes a similar trip across the islands of Japan's Inland Sea as Richie did twenty years prior. Donald Richie narrates the film.

The film won numerous awards, including Best Documentary at the Hawaii International Film Festival (1991) and the Earthwatch Film Award. It was screened at the Sundance Film Festival in 1992.

== Production ==
American-born author Donald Richie primarily researched and wrote about the Japanese people and their culture. In 1971 he published The Inland Sea, a memoir of his travels across the isolated islands of the Seto Inland Sea to observe the way of life of the region's inhabitants. Twenty years later, documentary film director Lucille Carra intended to retrace his trip. The region was researched for a three-year period before filming began.

== Reception ==
=== Critical reception ===
The film won the Best Documentary Award at the Hawaii International Film Festival and the Earthwatch Film Award. It screened at over forty film festivals, including the Sundance Film Festival. It is in the permanent film collections at the Museum of Modern Art and the UCLA/Sundance Collection.

== Home media ==
The Inland Sea was released on LaserDisc in the United States on November 17, 1993 by the Voyager Company. It was released on Blu-ray by The Criterion Collection in 2019.

== See also ==
- List of American films of 1991
