= Tokyo: A View of the City =

- Author: Donald Richie
- Language: English
- ISBN: 1-86189-034-6

Tokyo: A View of the City is a book by Donald Richie published in 1999. It is his description of Tokyo geographically and also describing his experiences over the decades of life he spent there.
