= Steve Kurtz =

American artist (1958–2025)

- Born: May 8, 1958
- Died: November 12, 2025 (aged 67)
- Education: University of North Texas, Florida State University (PhD)
- Known for: Critical Art Ensemble
- Movement: Tactical media
- Spouse: Hope Kurtz

Steve Kurtz (May 8, 1958 – November 12, 2025) was an American artist and co-founder of the art collective Critical Art Ensemble (CAE). His work with CAE is considered pioneering in the areas of politically engaged art, interventionist practices, and cultural research and action in the field of biotechnology and ecological struggle. He was also a writer and educator.

Kurtz's arrest in 2004 for suspected “bioterrorism” is the subject of a film, Strange Culture, by Lynn Hershman Leeson, and served as inspiration for the novel Orfeo by Richard Powers.

== Life and career ==
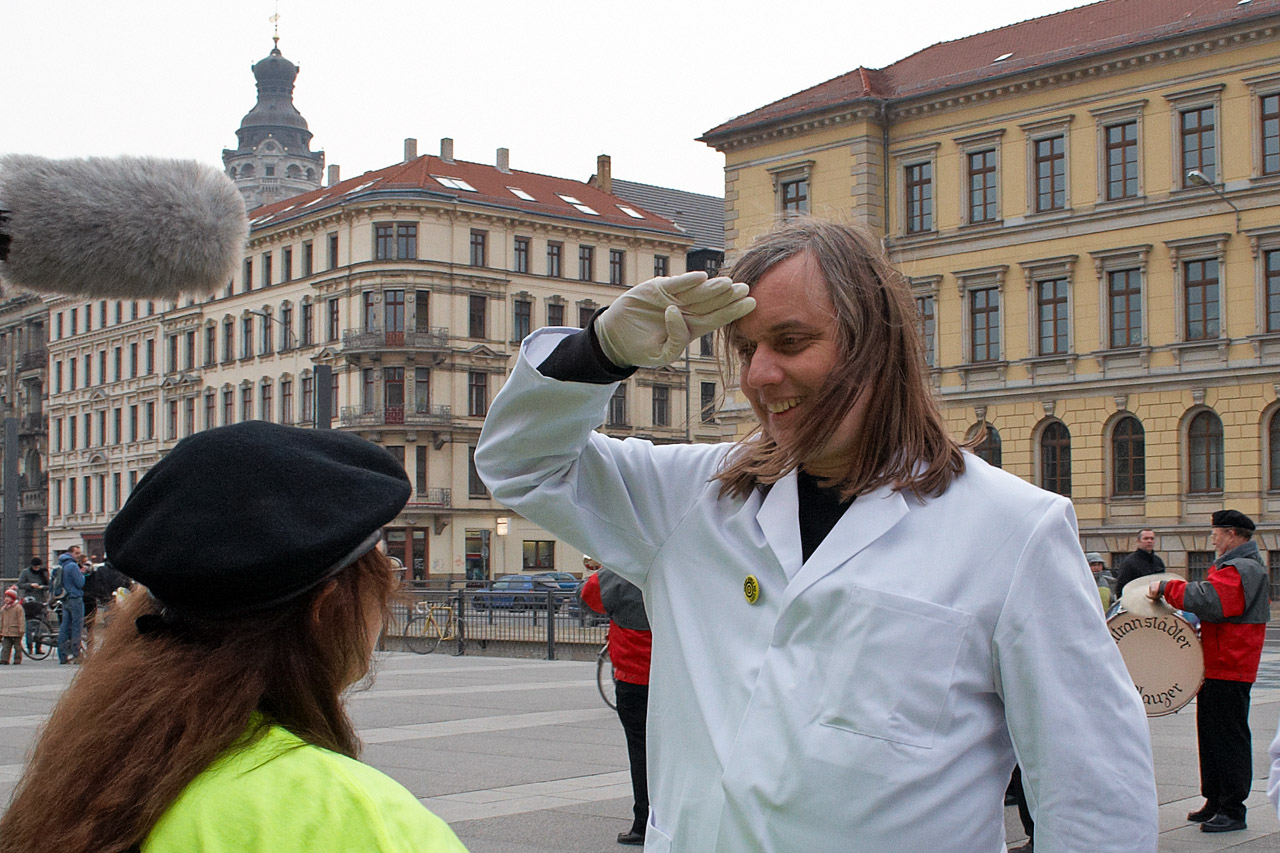
Steve Kurtz, Critical Art Ensemble performance Target Deception in Leipzig, Germany, February 24th 2007.

Kurtz was a founding member of the award-winning art and theater collective Critical Art Ensemble (CAE). Since its formation in 1987 in Tallahassee, Florida, CAE has been frequently invited to exhibit and perform projects examining issues surrounding information, communications and bio-technologies by museums and other cultural institutions. These include the Whitney Museum and the New Museum in NYC; the Corcoran Museum in Washington D.C.; the ICA, London; the MCA, Chicago; Schirn Kunsthalle, Frankfurt; Musée d’Art Moderne de la Ville de Paris; the London Museum of Natural History; the Kunsthalle Luzern; and Documenta(13).

The collective has written seven books, and its writings have been translated into eighteen languages. Its work has been covered by art journals including Artforum, Kunstforum, and the Drama Review. CAE is the recipient of awards, including the 2007 Andy Warhol Foundation Wynn Kramarsky Freedom of Artistic Expression Grant, the 2004 John Lansdown Award for Multimedia, and the 2004 Leonardo New Horizons Award for Innovation.

Kurtz studied sociology at University of North Texas and interdisciplinary humanities at Florida State University.

He was emeritus professor of art at the University at Buffalo, where he began teaching in 2002. From 1994 to 2002, he was a professor of art at Carnegie Mellon University, and he previously taught at Vermont College and Goddard College.

Kurtz died of cancer on November 12, 2025, at the age of 67. In his final year of life, he led the completion and publication of the Critical Art Ensemble book Unreality and Its Discontents: The Struggle Against Christian Nationalism.

== Controversy ==
=== Arrest ===
In May 2004, Kurtz called 911 to report the death of his wife, Hope Kurtz, of congenital heart failure. In order to create their art installations, the Kurtzes sometimes worked with biological equipment and had a small home lab and petri dishes containing biological specimens. At the time of Hope Kurtz's death they were working on an exhibit about genetically modified agriculture for the Massachusetts Museum of Contemporary Art. Buffalo police deemed these materials suspicious and notified the FBI, who detained Kurtz for 22 hours without charge on suspicion of "bioterrorism." Meanwhile, dozens of federal agents in hazardous material suits raided the Kurtz home, seizing books, computers, manuscripts, and art materials, and removing Hope Kurtz's body from the county coroner for further analysis.

Kurtz was allowed to return to his home one week later, after the Commissioner of Public Health for New York State had determined that nothing in the home posed any sort of public or environmental health or safety threat, and that Hope Kurtz had died of natural causes.

=== Charges ===
In July 2004, a grand jury refused to bring any bioterrorism charges, but did indict Kurtz on federal criminal mail fraud and wire fraud charges. Also indicted was Dr. Robert Ferrell, Professor of Genetics at the University of Pittsburgh Graduate School of Public Health, who served as a scientific consultant on Critical Art Ensemble's projects. The charges concern the way Kurtz and Ferrell allegedly ordered and mailed the non-pathogenic bacteria used in several museum installations. Under the USA PATRIOT Act the maximum possible sentence for these charges has increased from five to twenty years in prison. The charges related to how Ferrell allegedly helped Kurtz obtain $256 worth of harmless bacteria. "This is the first time in the history of the federal courts that the U.S. Department of Justice is intervening in the alleged breach of a Material Transfer Agreement (MTA) of nonhazardous materials in order to redefine it as a criminal offense[,]" reads a FAQ for a Kurtz defense fund website.

In October 2007, Ferrell pleaded guilty to misdemeanor charges. Ferrell's wife and daughter subsequently issued public statements saying the plea deal was due to the stress of the case and severe illness (Ferrell is a 27-year survivor of non-Hodgkin's lymphoma and suffered a series of strokes following his indictment in 2004). Ferrell was later sentenced to a year of unsupervised release and fined $500.

Kurtz received much of his legal representation from Paul Cambria, a Buffalo-based attorney who specializes in First Amendment issues.

=== 2008 Ruling ===
On April 21, 2008, the indictment for mail and wire fraud was ruled "insufficient on its face" by the presiding Judge Richard Arcara. This means that, even if the actions alleged in the indictment (which the judge must accept as fact) were true, they would not constitute a crime. The US Department of Justice (DoJ) had thirty days from the date of the ruling to appeal. No action was taken in this time period, thus stopping any appeal of the dismissal. The only option left for the DoJ would be to re-indict Kurtz.

=== Film ===
Filmmaker Lynn Hershman Leeson tells the story of Kurtz' arrest and prosecution in the 2007 film Strange Culture. The film was simultaneously screened and webcast in the Second Life game environment on January 22, 2007. It focuses on Kurtz' art, character, and interaction with law enforcement. Strange Culture premiered at the Sundance International Film Festival in 2007.

== See also ==
- Controversial invocations of the Patriot Act
