= Conceiving Ada =

- Directed by: Lynn Hershman Leeson
- Written by: Lynn Hershman Leeson; Eileen Jones; Sadie Plant; Betty A. Toole
- Produced by: Lynn Hershman Leeson; Henry S. Rosenthal
- Starring: Tilda Swinton; Francesca Faridany; Timothy Leary; Karen Black; John O'Keefe; John Perry Barlow; J.D. Wolfe
- Cinematography: Hiro Narita; Bill Zarchy (Virtual sets)
- Music by: The Residents
- Release date: September 10, 1997 (TIFF)
- Running time: 85 minutes
- Countries: United States; Germany
- Language: English

Conceiving Ada is a 1997 film produced, written, and directed by Lynn Hershman Leeson. Henry S. Rosenthal was co-producer of the film.

== Synopsis ==
Emmy Coer is a computer scientist obsessed with Countess Ada Lovelace, author of the first computer algorithm, written for Charles Babbage's "Analytical Engine". She is upset to discover that she is pregnant, believing that the pregnancy will interfere with her work. Afraid of losing her boyfriend, she decides to keep the baby. Emmy tries to work on a way of communicating with Lovelace in the past by way of "undying information waves".

Emmy eventually succeeds and is able to communicate with Ada and learn about her studies, her work and how she felt that in many ways her work was hampered by her children and by the time she lived in. Emmy wants to bring Ada into the present by allowing her to inhabit her body. A dying Ada refuses, insisting that Emmy needs to live her own life. However, by 2002 Emmy is raising a daughter who has been embedded with Ada's consciousness and who already shows a precociousness with computers despite the fact that Emmy is trying to raise her to have a normal childhood.

== Cast ==
- Tilda Swinton as Ada Augusta Byron King, Countess of Lovelace
- Francesca Faridany as Emmy Coer
- Timothy Leary as Sims
- Karen Black as Lady Byron/Mother Coer
- John O'Keefe as Charles Babbage
- John Perry Barlow as John Crosse
- J.D. Wolfe as Nicholas Clayton
- Owen Murphy as William Lovelace
- David Brooks as Children's Tutor (David)

== Reception ==
Upon its February 1999 premiere in New York City, Stephen Holden of The New York Times called its premise "intriguing" though he felt the film is "much better at throwing out ideas than at telling a story or at creating compelling characters"; and that it has a "overall air of woodenness and shrill didacticism".

That same month, Edward Guthmann of the San Francisco Chronicle called it a "film without category or precedent. A meditation on memory, feminism, immortality and the horizons of virtual reality, it's got enough ideas and intellectual fodder for a dozen films — which is its virtue and its defect at the same time. Directed by local video artist Lynn Hershman Leeson, Conceiving Ada is a fanciful, multilayered experiment about two women who connect through cyberspace across the divide of time and discover some remarkable parallels between their lives."

On Rotten Tomatoes it has an approval rating of 82% based on reviews from 11 critics.
