= !Women Art Revolution =

- Directed by: Lynn Hershman Leeson
- Written by: Lynn Hershman Leeson
- Produced by: Lynn Hershman Leeson; Sarah Peter; Kyle Stephan; Alexandra Chowaniec; Laura Blereau
- Edited by: Lynn Hershman Leeson
- Music by: Carrie Brownstein
- Distributed by: Zeitgeist Films
- Release dates: September 12, 2010 (TIFF); June 1, 2011 (United States)
- Running time: 83 minutes
- Country: United States
- Language: English

!Women Art Revolution is a 2010 American documentary film directed by Lynn Hershman Leeson and distributed by Zeitgeist Films. It tracks the feminist art movement over 40 years through interviews with artists, curators, critics, and historians.

== Synopsis ==
!Women Art Revolution is a documentary film, created by Lynn Hershman Leeson, to examine the under-recognized world of feminist art. Through interviews, documentary footage, and artworks, the film tracks the trajectory of feminist art. It begins at the start of the 1960s with antiwar and civil rights protests, it follows developments in feminist art through the 1970s.

Lynn Hershman Lesson interviewed artists, curators, critics, and historians for over 4 decades about their individual and group efforts to help women succeed in the art world and society by helping them overcome obstacles. There were over 40 individuals interviewed for the project. These interviews are done in a variety of places over time. The interviewees talk about their experiences in the art world facing obstacles because of their gender. Many of the artists discuss the works they made as a result. The movie begins with a scene at the Whitney Museum of American Art, where Hershman asks people to name 3 women artists; very few can name more than Frida Kahlo. Hershman calls the film the, "remains of an insistent history that refuses to wait any longer to be told." She says the events of the day led her to feel an, "urgency to capture that moment" and shoot whenever, wherever with a borrowed camera.

The film gets its name from Women Artists in Revolution (WAR), which formed in the 1960s as a coalition to raise awareness about the unique obstacles faced by female artists. Many of the issues started at a fundamental level, Rachel Rosenthal states in the movie, with the women artists not getting recognition in the study of art history and books. The interviewees all talk about how male-dominated the art world was, sharing their personal stories. The work these feminist artists were creating at the time were very different from works shown or talked about at the time.

The film overlays historical events with feminist art events, which were somewhat spurred on by these political events such as the Vietnam War, Black Panthers, Civil Rights Movement, Women's Liberation, and Free Speech Movement. She labels the 1968 Miss America Pageant as the moment when art and politics fused, culminating in a weeklong protest of art events.

The film mentions that minimalism was the popular art style of the time. Meant to be devoid of politics, this movement didn't match up with what was happening socially and politically. The feminist art movement worked to recognize contemporary political movements and social issues, creating a platform for awareness of these events.

== Cast ==
Interviewees
| Janine Antoni; Judith Baca; Judith Brodsky; Cornelia (Connie) Butler; Judy Chicago; Mary Beth Edelson; Howard Fox; Susan Grode; Guerrilla Girls; Harmony Hammond; Alanna Heiss; Lynn Hershman Leeson; Miranda July; Mike Kelley; Joyce Kozloff; Robert Kushner; Suzanne Lacy; Sheila Levrant de Bretteville; Lucy Lippard | Howardena Pindell; Yvonne Rainer; Maura Reilly; B. Ruby Rich; Faith Ringgold; Rachel Rosenthal; Martha Rosler; Moira Roth; Elizabeth Sackler; Miriam Schapiro; Carolee Schneeman; Lowery Sims; Sylvia Sleigh; Nancy Spero; Marcia Tucker; Camille Utterback; Cecilia Vicuña; Faith Wilding; Martha Wilson |

== Awards ==
- 2010: Official Selection at Toronto International Film Festival
- 2011: Official Selection at Sundance Film Festival, New Frontier
- 2011: Official Selection at Berlin International Film Festival

== Release ==
The film debuted at the Toronto International Film Festival (TIFF) 2010 as part of the Real to Reel category.

!Women Art Revolution played at New York's IFC Center beginning June 1, 2011, before opening around the country.

== Digital archive ==
In the film, Hershman states that the filming process, "has accumulated (roughly) 12,428 minutes of footage", and !W.A.R. shows only 83 minutes, leaving 12,343 minutes of footage out. A digital archive was created to contain the two decades of Hershmann Leeson's interviews that went into creating this film and is available through the Stanford University Libraries collection, !W.A.R. Voices of a Movement. According to the collection website, Hershmann Leeson desired this repository to "be shared with as wide an audience as possible".

== Reception ==
Barry Keith Grant praises the film in his Film International piece, "Leeson's film is a like a patchwork quilt of disparate footage, but in the end it all comes together to become an important feminist work. The film could well serve as required viewing for art and film students today."

Reviewer Ellen Druda says, "This powerful film will ignite even the tiniest spark of feminism in any woman's heart. Not only art lovers will come away with a deeper understanding of the movement and an appreciation for those who stood up and paved the way."

Richard Knight for the Windy City Times has a more critical view of the film, explaining, "Hershman Leeson succeeds in her goal to expose and pique the interest of the viewer to the radical feminist artists who used activist tactics to get their work shown, demanding parity with their male counterparts. However, by the time queer film historian B. Ruby Rich starts talking about how the lesbian artists didn't want to identify as artists because that label was considered bourgeois by their female counterparts, the movie has taken on an exclusionary air of its own – just like those 'womyn only' coffeehouses that existed 'back in the day'. So, while the film undercuts some of its own arguments by veering too strongly into the very separatist direction it decries – and annoyingly overlooks the artist's feminist forebears (like O'Keeffe, Nevelson and Kahlo, for example) – !Women Art Revolution does offer plenty of food for thought for everyone."

Elisabeth Subrin states that, "Fusing history with memoir, Lynn Hershman Leeson enlists multiple visual strategies to produce an elegantly layered visual and sonic web of politics and powerful emotion."
