= Critical Art Ensemble =

Artists' collective

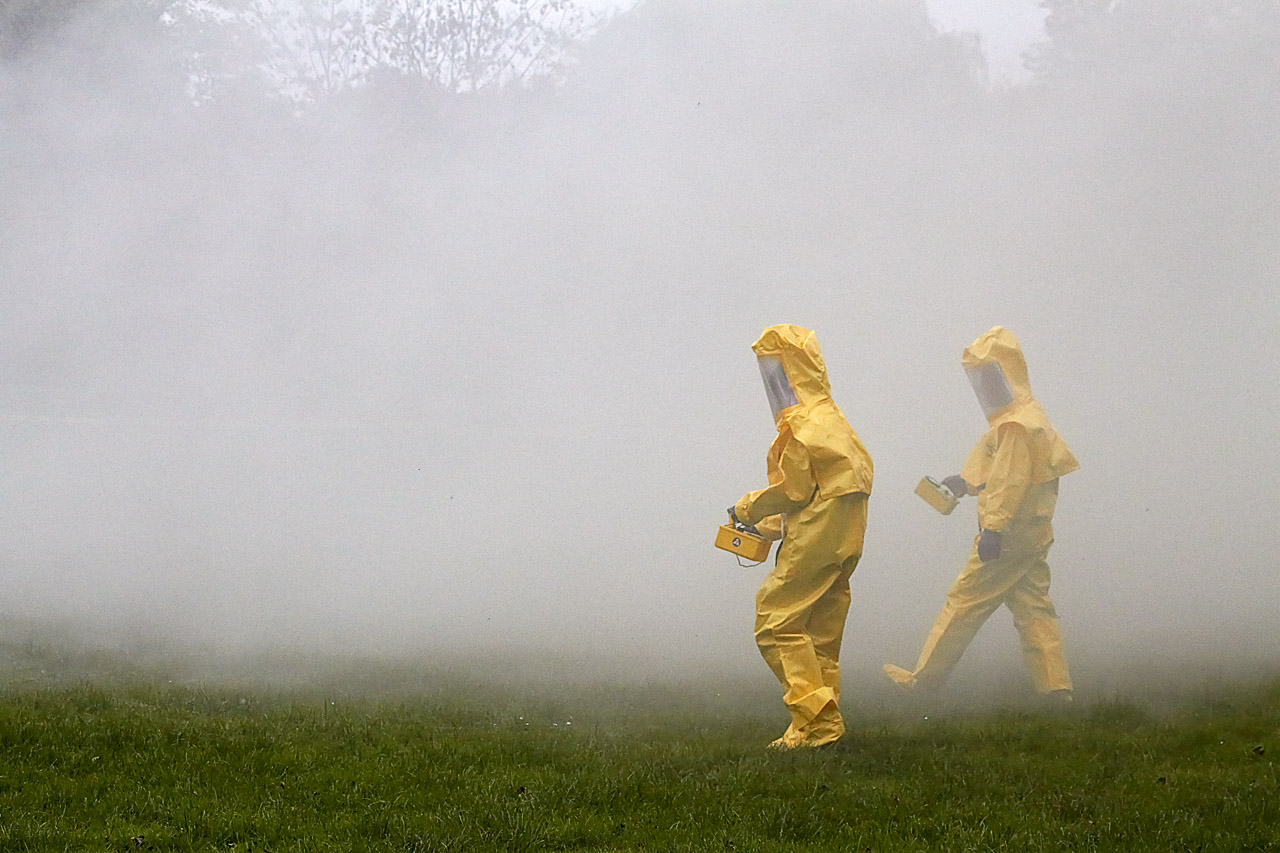
Critical Art Ensemble in Halle/Saale, Germany, performing Radiation Burn: A Temporary Monument to Public Safety, 15 October 2010.

Critical Art Ensemble (CAE) is a collective of tactical media practitioners working in fields including computer graphics and web design, film and video, photography, text art, book art, and performance. CAE describes tactical media as situational, ephemeral, and self-terminating, involving the use of media appropriate to a particular socio-political context.

CAE was formed in Tallahassee, Florida, in 1987. Since then, it has exhibited and performed projects examining issues surrounding information, communications, and biotechnology at museums and other cultural institutions. These have included the Whitney Museum of American Art, the New Museum, the Corcoran Gallery of Art, the Institute of Contemporary Arts, the Schirn Kunsthalle Frankfurt, the Musée d'Art Moderne de la Ville de Paris, the Natural History Museum, London, and Documenta 13.

CAE's website lists eight books published through 2018; a further book, Unreality and Its Discontents: The Struggle Against Christian Nationalism, was published in 2025. Its writings have been translated into 18 languages.

CAE's work has been discussed in art and performance publications including Artforum, Kunstforum International, and The Drama Review. CAE received the 2007 Andy Warhol Foundation Wynn Kramarsky Freedom of Artistic Expression Grant and a special 2004 Leonardo New Horizons Award for Innovation.

== History ==
=== 1986–1990 ===
Formed in 1986, CAE's focus has been on the exploration of the intersections between art, critical theory, technology, and political activism. In 1986, Steve Kurtz and Steve Barnes began a collaboration to make low-tech videos with students. They credited each person who contributed to the productions under the signature of Critical Art Ensemble. Original members also included Hope Kurtz, Dorian Burr, Claudia Bucher and George Barker. In 1987, the group's first multimedia exhibitions were held at Club Nu in Miami and Pappy's Lounge in Jackson, Mississippi. Buchner and Barker departed in 1988, and the group transformed into a broad-based artist and activist collective with six core members: Steve Kurtz, Barnes, Burr, Hope Kurtz, Beverly Schlee, and Ricardo Dominguez. The group's first events were produced in 1988: Political Art In Florida? in collaboration with Group Material, and Frontier Production in collaboration with Thomas Lawson. In 1988-89, CAE begin to release their books of plagiarist text poetry (of which there are six in all). In 1989, the group collaborated with Gran Fury to release Cultural Vaccines, a multimedia event in Tallahassee, Florida, which critiques U.S. policy on HIV. In 1990, the group collaborated with Prostitutes of New York to create Peep Show which premiered at Window on Gaines in Tallahassee, Florida.

=== 1991–1995 ===
In 1991, a body of work titled Fiesta Critica was developed in Indiantown, Florida, with local migrant workers; addressing Floridian agricultural labour relations. CAE produces an Easter fiesta platform to show the works. In 1992, the group produces Exit Culture as a series of works developed for Highway Culture. They also propose The Electronic Disturbance to Autonomedia publishers. In 1993, the group is invited to perform their first appearance in Europe at the Audio/Visual Experimental festival in the Netherlands. They complete the associational documentary series Apocalypse and Utopia. Also in 1993, Dominguez departed the group. In 1994, Autonomedia publishes The Electronic Disturbance and construction begins to create CAE's website Critical Art Ensemble. CAE projects begin to appear in both real and virtual forms as the Useless Technology project is performed as street action and launched online. The concept of electronic civil disobedience is introduced at the Terminal Futures conference in London. In 1995, the concept of the data body is introduced in lectures at the Ars Electronica. The group tours around Europe with the performance of Body Count.

=== 1996–2000 ===
In 1996, Autonomedia publishes Electronic Civil Disobedience (the companion text to The Electronic Disturbance), and research begins for the book Flesh Machine. In 1997, the group tours Flesh Frontiers and Shareholder's Briefing. Castelvecchi publishes the Italian translation of The Electronic Disturbance. The group goes to Documenta X in Kassel, Germany to begin the editing and conceptualizing process for the book README: Ascii Culture and the Revenge of Knowledge at Hybrid Workspace. The performance of Flesh Machine is toured, premiering in Vienna and closing in Helsinki at Kiasma Museum of Contemporary Art in summer 1998. L'Eclat publishes the French anthology of CAE's writings titled La Resistance Electronique. In 1998, Autonomedia publishes Flesh Machine and the German translation is published by Passagen. The group's street action occurs in Sheffield, UK, with the performance of The International Campaign for Free Alcohol and Tobacco for the Unemployed. Castelvecchi publishes the Italian translation of Electronic Civil Disobedience. In 1999, The Society for Reproductive Anachronisms is premiered at Rutgers University in the student cafeteria. Work begins on Cult of the New Eve (CoNE) and is premiered at St. Clara Hospital in Rotterdam, The Netherlands. A new book project is begun, entitled Digital Resistance: Explorations in Tactical Media. In 2000, Autonomedia publishes Digital Resistance: Explorations in Tactical Media and the German anthology of CAE's writings on electronic media is published by Passagen.

The group has exhibited and performed at diverse venues internationally, ranging from the street, to the museum, to the internet. Museum exhibitions include the Whitney Museum and The New Museum in NYC; The Corcoran Museum in Washington D.C.; The ICA, London; The MCA, Chicago; Schirn Kunsthalle, Frankfurt; Musée d'Art Moderne de la Ville de Paris; and The London Museum of Natural History. Critical Art Ensemble

Burr left CAE in 2002.

=== 2003–2004 ===
Free Range Grain was a performance-based project which tested foods to contest the global food trade system. The project used basic molecular biology techniques over a 72-hour period to test foods that others deemed suspicious of "contamination" even when the authorities were guarding against them. This performance sought to explore biotechnology and the science behind it, as the artists felt it was "one of the most misunderstood areas of production in the cultural landscape".

== Works and artistic approach ==
=== Performance style ===
In its performances, CAE creates various performative identities, such as that of a group of scientists or a corporation. Instead of using fancy, high-tech machinery they use 'high school lab equipment as well as common household supplies and groceries', which brings the scientific difficulty down to a level at which the public can understand and engage with because the worlds of science and technology in the modern world are 'increasingly privatised'. This playful style, however, contrasts with the groups numerous books and manifestos which have an analytical focus.

Nicola Triscott is the founder of The Arts Catalyst. In her writings about the CAE, she states that their participatory theatre 'aims to involve the public in the processes of biotechnology in order to contribute to the development of an informed and critical public discourse on contemporary bioscience'. This provides people with knowledge of how science can be interesting and that it can be misused if in the wrong hands. Their works have ranged from genetically modified food, the Human Genome Project (CoNE), reproductive technologies, genetic screening and transgenics. The way they approach this style is through directly engaging with the science and presenting techniques generally unknown to the public in a performative way.

The work of the CAE continues to entertain, inform and show the public how biotechnology can be demonstrated via performance.

As part of their critical objectives, they target their attention on private corporations unknown in the public sector who misuse biotechnology. This tactical response is what the CAE have termed 'Fuzzy Biological Sabotage' (or FBS if abbreviated).

Using harmless biological species including plants, insects and reptiles, they make sophisticated pranks 'to operate in the grey, in-between spaces as yet unregulated by institutional regimes'

=== Publications ===
The collective has written 7 books, and its writings have been translated into 18 languages. Its books include: The Electronic Disturbance (1994), Electronic Civil Disobedience & Other Unpopular Ideas (1996), Flesh Machine: Cyborgs, Designer Babies, & New Eugenic Consciousness (1998), Digital Resistance: Explorations in Tactical Media (2001), Molecular Invasion (2002), Marching Plague (2006), and the project book Disturbances (2012).

CAE is noted for having written the article Nomadic Power and Cultural Resistance, in which CAE argues that with the creation of the internet the power of the elite has become mobile to the extent that it is difficult for a dissident to directly confront the authority, comparing the untrackable, elusive mobility to that of the Scythians. They demolished the idea that power cannot corrupt and co-opt network and hypertext technologies, that such technologies have a predetermined and manifest destiny of freedom. CAE goes on to observe that occupation theory itself is challenged by cyberspace and the difficulties it presents in terms of focusing a group effort against one authority as opposed to a singular hacker, fiddling with code. An important distinction is made that when rebellious acts are carried out by an individual as opposed to a group in singularity, that the dissenter is seen as a vandal instead of a protester. The article mentions that resistance in the form posters, pamphleteering, street theater and public art have been useful in the past but now that the public is electronically engaged one must bring their resistance methods online.

=== Molecular Invasion ===
In correlation to CAE's work "Molecular Invasion (2002)," the collective hosted an exhibit about genetically modified crops. They planted Monsanto's genetically modified seeds that were designed to be immune to Monsanto's commercial pesticide roundup (Glyphosate). They successfully grew these crops in their exhibit however once the plants were fully grown they applied an enzyme inhibitor that was reverse engineered to the plants that eradicating the protection that these crops had against the pesticide. The plants quickly died. Though CAE has been showing visualized traces of criticalized artworks that shows paradox of modern agriculture systems, CAE's been tried to make stance that they do not have general position whether if CAE is for or against genetically modified organisms(GMOs).

=== Cult of the New Eve ===
In 1999, CAE began a new project to draw attention to the ways in which scientific discourses surrounding biotechnologies drew upon promissory religious rhetoric. This participatory performance was titled Cult of the New Eve (or CoNE when abbreviated) and included a "communion" using a random library of the entire genome of the first female donor to the Human Genome Project taken from a blood sample. CAE spliced the genome and inserted it into yeast, which was then placed into host wafers and beer given to audience members who were willing to participate. The genome from the donor is intended to represent a 'New Eve… a sacrosanct Messiah'. The project also offers public and online preaching, baptisms, communion, sacred theological and cosmological texts and prophecies.

=== GenTerra ===
CAE created a performance titled GenTerra which raised issues surrounding ethics and safety in performative science. This was done through an investigation into creating transgenic life forms and seeing the consequences of potentially releasing them into the environment. It was the audience members who had to decide whether the bacteria was harmful or not in a game of 'genetic Russian roulette'. Triscott states through her own experience of participating in the performance that members of the audience were given the opportunity to grow and store their own bacteria, with full instructions and guidance. With the aid of a spinning machine, bacteria were spun with only one of ten chambers holding active bacteria. The purpose of GenTerrra is to 'introduce bioproducts to the audience, and demonstrate the practical applications of such research, such as disease treatment and xenotransplantation'. As CAE wear lab-coats and appear as professional scientists, they simulate actual biotechnology corporations, emphasizing their intentions even further.

=== Collective structure ===
CAE attributes the collective's longevity to their structure which has contributed to positive attitudes throughout the group. The number of members, ranging from three to eight and known as a 'cellular structure' has managed to be sustained without members feeling alienated. As each member has the opportunity to show off their individual strengths and weaknesses, the risk of conflict and mistrust is reduced. They do not believe in equality; rather that every member has 'a voice in the production process [of a project]; however the member with the greatest expertise in the area has authority over the final product'.

=== Amateurism ===
CAE has also stated that amateurs have the ability to see through dominant paradigms, are more free to recombine elements of paradigms thought long dead, and can apply everyday life experience to their deliberations. Most important, however, amateurs are not invested in institutional systems of knowledge production and policy construction, and hence do not have irresistible forces guiding the outcome of their process…'.

=== Future projects ===
'Since 2006, CAE has changed the focus of its work towards a critique of US defense policy, and has moved away from its interrogation of biotechnology'.

== Controversy ==
=== Steve Kurtz case ===
In 2004, one of CAE's founders, Steve Kurtz, was arrested on suspicion of bioterrorism. On the morning of 11 May 2004, he awoke to find that his wife, Hope, had died in her sleep. He called 911. Police became suspicious after noticing the biology laboratory in his home. They contacted the FBI, and Kurtz was detained for 24 hours before being interrogated. His house was searched for biohazardous materials and subsequently cleared.

A week later, Kurtz's CAE collaborators were ordered to appear before a grand jury investigating possible violations of laws concerning biological weapons. The grand jury met in July 2004 and cleared Kurtz of all "bioterrorism" charges; however, the FBI continued to press charges against him, and the case continued for four years. The case was widely covered in the U.S. and international press and prompted protests among artists and scientists. A website was created to collect donations for Kurtz's legal expenses. The case was dismissed in 2008.

According to Nicola Triscott, the FBI "thought they had a situation out of which they could manufacture a terrorism case, which potentially brought great personal rewards", drawing a comparison with the "Lackawanna Six Sleeper Cell" case, in which six Yemeni Americans were convicted of supporting al-Qaeda.

== Awards ==
Critical Art Ensemble has received several awards, including the 2007 Andy Warhol Foundation Wynn Kramarsky Freedom of Artistic Expression Grant UB Art Professor "Strange Culture" Case Goes to Court | WBFO, the 2004 John Lansdown Award for Multimedia, and the 2004 Leonardo New Horizons Award for Innovation Rhizome | [Leonardo/ISAST Network] Leonardo/ISAST gives New Horizons Award for Innovation to Critical Art Ensemble (Leonardo/ISAST).

CAE's work has been covered by art journals including Artforum, Kunstforum, and The Drama Review. Calendar | The Humanities Project | University of Rochester

== See also ==
- Autonomedia
- BioArt
- Biopunk
- Electronic Disturbance Theatre
- Institute for Applied Autonomy
- Steve Kurtz
- Tactical media
- Internet activism
- Wayne Roberts
