= Brian Cotnoir =

Brian Cotnoir is an alchemist, multi-media artist and award-winning filmmaker.

In 1979, Cotnoir's article The Philosophical Mercury, written the previous year, was published in Parachemy, the journal of Frater Albertus' Paracelsus Research Society. In 2014, he published a collection of new translations of the Emerald Tablet, a brief alchemical work attributed to Hermes Trismegistus. His other books include Practical Alchemy: A Guide to the Great Work (2021) and, most recently, On Alchemy: Essential Practices and Making Art as Alchemy (2023). He is also the author of a series of zines on alchemy. In 2014, he launched Khepri Press as a platform for his work. He has presented seminars and workshops around the world based on his alchemical research and experiences.

As an editor, Cotnoir has worked on documentaries including: The Inland Sea (1991), Dvorak and America (2000) and The Execution Machine: Texas Death Row (1997), as well as the drama film Slam (1998). His film work has been screened at international venues including the Museum of Modern Art, Sundance Film Festival, HBO and PBS.

== Works ==
- The Philosophical Mercury, 1979
- The Weiser Concise Guide to Alchemy, 2006
- The Emerald Tablet, 2014
- Alchemy: The Poetry of Matter, 2017
- Empty Chair, 2018
- The Philosopher's Stone: A Modern Comparative Approach to Alchemy from the Psychological and Magical Points of View (foreword) (by Israel Regardie), 2019
- Visions, 2019
- Prelude to A Hymn to Hekate, 2019
- Practical Alchemy: A Guide to the Great Work, 2021
- On Alchemy: Essential Practices and Making Art as Alchemy, 2023
