= Lucille Carra =

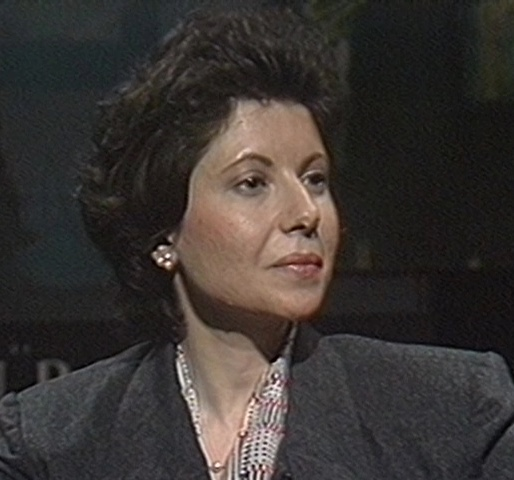
- Carra on CUNY TV's Cinema Then, Cinema Now (1988)
- Born: New York City, United States
- Education: New York University (BFA in Film Production; MA in Cinema Studies)
- Occupations: documentary film director, producer, writer
- Known for: The Inland Sea (1992); Dvořák and America (2000); The Last Wright (2008)

Lucille Carra (born New York City) is an American documentary film director, producer, and writer. She is of Sicilian descent. All of her films have been seen on PBS and international television. Carra has a BFA in Film Production and an MA in Cinema Studies from New York University's Tisch School of the Arts. At New York University, she was cited Outstanding Woman Student of the Year (School of the Arts) by the New York University Alumni Association. She formed Travelfilm Company for the production and distribution of documentary films after working in international film distribution.

== Films ==
Carra's films are classified as arts documentaries, noted for new research and scholarship, use of newly found music, and classically filmed landscapes. They are independently produced, and are funded through cultural agencies, government foundations and television and distribution companies. Carra works in 16mm film and restored archival film and video.

Carra's films focus on artists and the specific cultural and social contexts in which they worked. The Inland Sea (1992) is based on the travel memoir by Donald Richie and retraces the author's journey while documenting the fading regional culture of rural islands of the Seto Inland Sea. The isolated region was researched for a three-year period before filming began. The film won the Best Documentary Award at the Hawaii International Film Festival and the Earthwatch Film Award. It screened at over forty film festivals, including the Sundance Film Festival. It is in the permanent film collections at the Museum of Modern Art and the UCLA/Sundance Collection. In 2019, the restored version was produced and distributed by the Criterion Collection. Carra's 1991 interview with Donald Richie is presented in the edition. Dvořák and America (2000) was the first U.S./Czech Television documentary co-production. It is the first film about the years the composer Antonín Dvořák spent in the United States and his relationships with his African-American students, including his informal student, Harry T. Burleigh. It features new orchestrations by Maurice Peress. It premiered at Queen Elizabeth Hall at Southbank Centre, London. The Last Wright: Frank Lloyd Wright and the Park Inn Hotel (2008), produced and written with Garry McGee, is the only project in any media about the last standing hotel designed by Frank Lloyd Wright, The Park Inn, located in Iowa. The film won the Grand Prize as Best Documentary at the Iowa Motion Picture Association and was nominated for a Midwest EMMY Award for Best Writing for Documentary. The film compares the degraded condition of the Park Inn Hotel with many of Wright's important works, and travels to Japan to offer contrast Wright's Imperial Hotel, Tokyo, now partially restored at Meiji-Mura, Japan. In 2007, researching material for a film on pianist Glenn Gould, Glenn Gould, Recording Artist, Carra found the long-thought lost U.S. television program written and performed by the performer, The Return of the Wizard (1968). She presented screenings the Gasteig Cultural Center in Munich, the Paley Center for Media and the Montreal Festival of Film on Art and was awarded a Media grant from the National Endowment for the Arts and an award from the New York State Council on the Arts to restore the program and to continue the film's research.
