= Teknolust =

2002 film by Lynn Hershman Leeson

- Theatrical release poster
- Directed by: Lynn Hershman Leeson
- Written by: Lynn Hershman Leeson
- Produced by: Lynn Hershman Leeson
- Starring: Tilda Swinton; Jeremy Davies; James Urbaniak; Karen Black; Al Nazemian; Josh Kornbluth; Thomas Jay Ryan
- Edited by: Lisa Fruchtman
- Music by: Klaus Badelt; Ramin Djawadi; Mark Tschanz
- Distributed by: Velocity Entertainment
- Release date: January 2002
- Running time: 82 minutes
- Countries: United States; United Kingdom; Germany
- Language: English
- Box office: $28,811

Teknolust is a 2002 American film written, produced, and directed by Lynn Hershman Leeson who, at the time of production, was working in the art department at University of California, Davis. The film stars Tilda Swinton and Jeremy Davies.

Lynn Hershman Leeson's art project "Agent Ruby" was an expansion inspired by this film. "Agent Ruby" used artificial intelligence to hold conversations with online users. These conversations shaped Agent Ruby's memory, knowledge, and moods.

== Synopsis ==
The film is about the scientist Rosetta Stone (Swinton) who injects her DNA into three Self Replicating Automatons (S.R.A.s). These cyborg clones must habitually venture into the real world in order to obtain a supply of Y chromosome in the form of semen to keep them alive. Unfortunately, their periodic treks into the outside world seem to leave the males from whom they obtain the chromosome with a strange virus that overtakes both their bodies and their computers. The lust carries over into the technology, leaving the males' world aghast.

== Cast ==
Role	Actor	Notes
Rosetta Stone/Marinne/Olive/Ruby	Tilda Swinton	Named for the Rosetta Stone
Sandy	Jeremy Davies	
Agent Hopper	James Urbaniak	
Professor Crick	John O'Keefe	
Dirty Dick	Karen Black	
Dr. Bea	Al Nazemian	
Dr. Aye	S.U. Violet	
Tim	Josh Kornbluth	
Preacher	Thomas Jay Ryan	
Nelia	Sumalee Montano	Uncredited role

== Awards and nominations ==
- Fantasporto International Fantasy Film Award 2004 - Best Film (nominated)
- Hamptons International Film Festival 2002 - Feature Film Prize in Science and Technology (won)
