= Lynn Hershman Leeson =

American artist and filmmaker

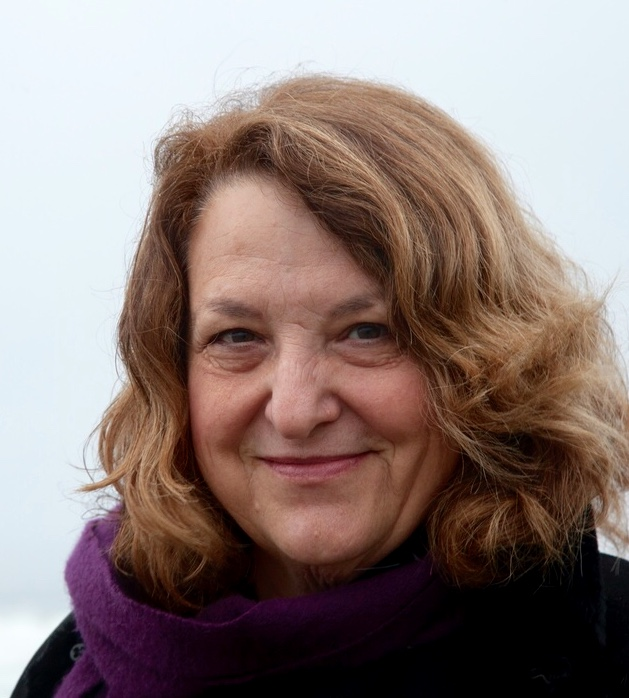
- Born: Lynn Lester Hershman; June 17, 1941 (age 85); Cleveland, Ohio, U.S.
- Education: Case Western Reserve University, San Francisco State University
- Occupations: Artist, filmmaker, new media art
- Known for: New media art; film
- Notable work: America's Finest; Synthia; CybeRoberta; Tillie; Agent Ruby; DiNA; Conceiving Ada; Teknolust; Strange Culture; !Women Art Revolution
- Awards: D.velop Digital Art Award; Sloan Prize for Writing and Directing; Siggraph Distinguished Artist Award; IFP Pixel Market Prize
- Website: lynnhershman.com

Lynn Hershman Leeson (née Lynn Lester Hershman; born June 17, 1941) is an American multimedia artist and filmmaker. Her work with technology and in media-based practices is credited with helping to legitimize digital art forms. Her interests include feminism, race, surveillance, and artificial intelligence and identity theft through algorithms and data tracking.

Hershman Leeson has been described as a "new media pioneer" for her integration of emerging technologies into her work and is one of five artists that art historian Patrick Frank examines in his 2024 book Art of the 1980s: As If the Digital Mattered.

== Early life and education ==
Lynn Hershman was born in 1941 in Cleveland, Ohio. Her father, who had immigrated to the United States from Montreal, was a pharmacist, and her mother was a biologist. She reports experiencing both physical abuse and sexual abuse during her childhood.

In 1963, Hershman graduated with a bachelor's degree in Education, Museum Administration and Fine Arts from Case Western Reserve University in Cleveland. After graduation, she moved to California intending to study painting and join the student activism at the University of California, Berkeley. She left Berkeley before registering for classes. She later completed a Master of Fine Arts degree from San Francisco State University in 1972. One aspect of Hershman's master's thesis involved writing art criticism under three pseudonyms: Prudence Juris, Herbert Goode and Gay Abandon. She received an honorary Ph.D degree from Pratt Institute in 2023.

== Career ==
Hershman Leeson's work concerns identity, consumerism, privacy in an era of surveillance, interfacing of humans and machines, feminism, violence, artificial intelligence and identity theft through algorithms and data tracking, and the relationship between real and virtual worlds. Her work grew out of an installation art and performance tradition, with an emphasis on interactivity.

Her projects explore technology in digital media and science. Hershman Leeson was the first artist to launch an interactive piece using Videodisc, a precursor to DVD (Lorna, 1983–84), as well the first artist to incorporate a touch screen interface into her artwork (Deep Contact, 1984–1989). Her networked robotic art installation (The Difference Engine #3, 1995–1998) is an example of her tendency to expand her artwork beyond the traditional realms of art.

Work by Hershman Leeson is featured in the public collections of the Museum of Modern Art, the William Lehmbruck Museum, the ZKM (Zentrum fur Kunst und Medientechnologie), the Los Angeles County Museum of Art, the National Gallery of Canada, di Rosa, the Walker Art Center and the University Art Museum, Berkeley, in addition to the private collections of Donald M. Hess and Arturo Schwarz, among many others. Commissions include projects for the Tate Modern, San Francisco Museum of Modern Art, de Young Museum, Daniel Langlois and Stanford University, and Charles Schwab.

From 1993 to 2004, Hershman Leeson taught in the Art Studio program at the University of California, Davis, where she is currently a professor emerita. She was named chair of the San Francisco Art Institute film department in 2007. She also served as an A. D. White Professor at Large at Cornell University and was the 2013–2014 Dorothy H. Hirshon "Director in Residence" at The New School.

== Work ==
=== Early works ===
Hershman Leeson's earlier works drew interest from themes within science fiction and assemblages of the human body and sexuality. After suffering from cardiomyopathy while pregnant in 1965, Leeson, created her piece Breathing Machine, composed of wax casts of her own face with dyes and assemblages as well as the recordings of her struggled breathing during her illness. The recording includes the voice asking the viewer a series of personal and uncomfortable questions.

Her 1968 piece Breathing Machine II is composed of a wax face with a wig and butterflies contained in a wood and plexiglass display, expressing the a dichotomy of life and entrapment within the female body. Shaped by her experiences, Leeson's early works were political in nature and characterized as being closer inspections of femininity and gender roles.

=== Alter egos ===
From 1974 until 1978, Hershman Leeson 'developed' a fictional persona and alter ego named "Roberta Breitmore." It consisted not only of a physical self-transformation through make-up, clothing, and wigs, but a fully-fledged personality existing over an extended period of time and whose existence could be proven in the world through physical evidence, such as a driver's license, credit card, and letters from her psychiatrist. Additional evidence of Roberta’s existence included a blood sample, personal newspaper ads, as well as a dental X-ray. Roberta also took part in trends popular for the time, participating in Erhard Seminars Training (EST) and enrolling in a Weight Watchers diet program. Through her documentation of Roberta's existence only through records, Hershman Leeson explored the boundaries between reality and constructed identity. Examples include Roberta’s Body Language Chart, in which Hershman Leeson captions Roberta’s body language as behavior similar to female hysteria. An additional example is Roberta’s Construction Chart 1, where Hershman Leeson based her construction of Roberta on instructional magazine ads that informed women on how to beautify themselves.

The performance was later taken to further lengths when Hershman Leeson introduced another three 'Robertas', by hiring other performers to enact her character. These 'clones' of Roberta adopted the same look and attire, engaged in some of Roberta's correspondence and also went on some of Roberta (Hershman Leeson's) dates. Hershman Leeson sought out these Roberta ‘clones’ to prove that her (both Hershman Leeson and Roberta) negative experiences as a woman were not exclusive to just her; the other actors playing Roberta ended up shared negative experiences as well, highlighting the misogyny women faced in their daily lives at the time. Towards the end, the 'original' Roberta withdrew from her character leaving the three 'clones' to continue her work, until they were retired in a performance at the Palazzo dei Diamanti in Ferrara, Italy in 1978, during an exorcism at the grave of Lucrezia Borgia. What remains are the physical artefacts of any life: documentation and personal effects such as legal and medical documents and a diary.

Between 1995 and 2000, Roberta transformed into the CybeRoberta, an interactive artificial intelligent sculpture on the web. CybeRoberta was the second of two telerobotic dolls from Hershman Leeson’s series The Dollie Clones, the first being Tillie, The Telerobotic Doll — named after actor Tilda Swinton, who starred in the feature film Conceiving Ada, a film that Hershman Leeson directed. CybeRoberta is a custom-made doll with cameras integrated into its eyes, with one eye streaming a live, in color video feed, while the other captures 320-by-200 pixel black and white photos that are uploaded online every 30 seconds. In-person visitors can also upload images, as well as click an “eyecon” on the doll’s website to turn the doll’s head 180 degrees, allowing it to survey the surrounding area. When both CybeRoberta and Tillie are exhibited together, they also pirate each other's video feeds. In 2006 Roberta Breitmore developed into a character in Second Life. After Stanford University acquired her archive, Leeson worked with Henry Lowood (Stanford Humanities Lab) to convert parts of the archive into something for a broader public. They worked to recreate and re-enact both Roberta Breitmore and The Dante Hotel in a virtual space.

=== Lorna (1983) ===
Described as the first interactive laser artdisk art project, Hershman Leeson's 1983 work Lorna tells the story of an agoraphobic woman who never left her one-room apartment. As Lorna watched the news and advertisements, watched the news and ads, she became fearful, afraid to leave her tiny room. Viewers were invited to liberate Lorna from her fears, using remote control units, and have the option of directing her life into several possible plots and endings.

The plot has multiple variations that can be seen backwards, forwards, at increased or decreased speeds, and from several points of view. There is no hierarchy in the ordering of decisions. And the icons were often made of cut-off and dislocated body parts such as a mouth, or an eye.

=== Room of One's Own (1990–1993) ===
From 1990 to 1993, Lynn Hershman Leeson produced a project called Room of One's Own. The project is said to be inspired by Thomas Edison's kinetograph, a device where a film is displayed on loop and an individual is allowed to view it through a peephole. The project, Room of One’s Own, allows the viewer to peer inside of a box through a small periscopic device and see a bed, telephone, chair, television, and some clothes on the floor. In the back of the small room, a woman appears on a screen and it is there where she asks the following: “What are you doing here? Please look somewhere else!”. There are about 17 segments and depending on where the viewer is focusing, a different video plays in the back wall. Throughout the experience, the viewer is positioned to be a voyeur, an individual who gains sexual gratification by watching an unsuspecting individual either partly undress, get naked or engage in sexual activities, but any pleasure that is gained, is quickly frustrated in many different ways. At the end, the viewer's reflection is shown in a small television in the back of the room.

=== Agent Ruby ===
Hershman Leeson created the "Agent Ruby" website as a companion to her 2002 film Teknolust. Agent Ruby used artificial intelligence to hold conversations with online users. These conversations shaped Agent Ruby's memory, knowledge, and moods. In 2013 the SFMOMA presented Lynn Hershman Leeson: The Agent Ruby Files, a digital and analog presentation which reinterpreted dialogues drawn from the decade-long archive of text files of Agent Ruby's conversations with online users to reflect on technologies, recurrent themes, and patterns of audience engagement.

== Films and documentaries ==
Lynn Hershman Leeson has directed 26 films, including six feature-length films. According to Leeson:

The films are all about loss and technology. Ada Lovelace invented computer language, but was never credited and was basically erased from history. Teknolust is about artificial intelligence clones: the bots that escape into reality and interact with human life, in effect a symbiosis between technological life and human life, and how the two can marry. Strange Culture again was about misidentity, where the media created a fictional character that they blame this crime on, rather than the actual person. All of these works are about erasure of identity and how technology adds to it and creates it. And how you can defeat that.

A 1990 documentary, Desire Inc. features a series of seductive television ads in which a sexy woman asked for viewers to call her.

Hershman Leeson's six feature films—Strange Culture, Teknolust, Conceiving Ada, !Women Art Revolution, Tania Libre, and The Electronic Diaries—have been part of the Sundance Film Festival, the Toronto International Film Festival and The Berlin International Film Festival, among others, and have won numerous awards. Hershman's ground-breaking 2011 release, !Women Art Revolution, was a feature-length documentary about the feminist art movement in the United States, distributed by Zeitgest Films. Artists interviewed for the film include Judy Chicago, Guerilla Girls, Miranda July, Mike Kelley, Joyce Kozloff, Howardena Pindell, Yvonne Rainer, Faith Ringgold, Martha Rosler, Carolee Schneemann, Cecilia Vicuña, and many others, including the artist herself. The film is currently held by Stanford University in their archives, and can be accessed through the university's website documenting the project.

As part of her 2014 exhibition "How To Disappear," she premiered her video The Ballad of JT LeRoy, which examined Laura Albert's use of the literary persona JT LeRoy. Reflecting on the parallels between JT LeRoy and Roberta Breitmore, Hershman Leeson has commented:

The concept of an alter ego is not new at all. Writers have been protecting themselves in that way for centuries. Mary Shelley did it. Of course Laura took this practice further and I think that was very smart and I do not think she deserves the kind of condemnation that she got. If I had done the Roberta thing ten years later, I would have faced the same problems.

In 2017, Leeson released Tania Libre, composed of the therapy sessions between Cuban-artist and activist Tanya Bruguera and Dr. Frank M. Ochberg revolving around the subjects of political surveillance, past trauma and the aftermath of imprisonment in Havana after her prior advocating for freedom of expression.

== Retrospectives ==
A 2007 retrospective at the Whitworth Art Gallery in Manchester, Autonomous Agents, featured a comprehensive range of the artist's work—from the Roberta Breitmore series (1974–78) to videos from the 1980s and interactive installations that use the Internet and artificial intelligence software. Her influential early ventures into performance and photography are also featured in the current touring exhibition WACK! Art and the Feminist Revolution, organized by the Los Angeles Museum of Contemporary Art. The Art and Films of Lynn Hershman Leeson: Secret Agents, Private I, was published by The University of California Press in 2005 on the occasion of another retrospective at the Henry Gallery in Seattle.

In 2014 The ZKM Museum of Contemporary Art in Karlsruhe, Germany held "Lynn Hershman Leeson: Civic Radar", a retrospective of work. The ZKM Museum described the retrospective as having "realized the first retrospective which not only ensures an overview of all creative phases in Leeson's oeuvre but also the most recent productions of this innovative artist." While encompassing a wide body of Hershman's work throughout the years, as an exhibition, "Civic Radar" highlights Hershman's interest in technology, looking closely at artificial intelligence and genetic modification. In 2017, "Lynn Hershman Leeson: Civic Radar," Hershman's retrospective from ZKM was hosted at the Yerba Buena Center for the Arts in San Francisco, California.

In 2021, the New Museum in New York City hosted the first solo museum exhibition in New York of Hershman Leeson's work, entitled Twisted. The New Museum described the exhibition as bringing "together a selection of Hershman Leeson’s work in drawing, sculpture, video, and photography, along with interactive and net-based works, focusing on themes of transmutation, identity construction, and the evolution of the cyborg. Filling the New Museum’s Second Floor galleries, this presentation [included] some of the artist’s most important projects, including wax-cast Breathing Machine sculptures (1965–68) and selections from hundreds of early drawings from the 1960s, many of which [were never] exhibited before." The exhibition also included works from the Roberta Breitmore series (1973–78), her video Seduction of a Cyborg (1994) and selections from the series Water Women (1976–present), Phantom Limb (1985–88), Cyborg (1996–2006), Infinity Engine (2014–present), and other works. The exhibition was curated by Margot Norton, Allen and Lola Goldring Curator, and was accompanied by a fully illustrated catalogue with contributions by Karen Archey and Martine Syms, and an interview with Lynn Hershman Leeson conducted by Margot Norton.

== Exhibitions ==
=== Solo exhibitions ===
- 2001, Media & Identity, Sweeney Art Gallery, University of California, Riverside, Riverside, California
- 2005, Hershmanlandia, Henry Art Gallery, University of Washington, Seattle, Washington
- 2008, No Body Special, De Young Museum, San Francisco, California
- 2008, The Floating Museum (1975–1978): Lynn Hershman Leeson, New Langton Arts, San Francisco, California
- 2012, Me as Roberta, Museum of Contemporary Art in Kraków, Krakow, Poland
- 2012, Seducing Time, Retrospective, Kunsthalle Bremen, Bremen, Germany
- 2012, W.A.R. Documentary screening, Reina Sofia, Madrid, Spain
- 2012, W.A.R. Documentary screening, Moderna Museet, Stockholm, Sweden
- 2013, Lynn Hershman Leeson: The Agent Ruby Files, San Francisco Museum of Modern Art (SFMoMa), San Francisco, California
- 2014, Pop Departures, Seattle Art Museum, Seattle, Washington
- 2014, Taking a Stand Against War, Lehmbruck Museum, Duisburg, Germany
- 2014, Vertigo of Reality, Akademie der Künste, Berlin, Germany
- 2014, How to Disappear, Aanant & Zoo, Berlin, Germany
- 2014–2015, Civic Radar. Lynn Hershman Leeson - The Retrospective, ZKM Center for Art and Media Karlsruhe, Karlsruhe, Germany
- 2015, Lynn Hershman Leeson: Origins of the Species (Part 2), Modern Art Oxford, Oxford, England, United Kingdom
- 2016, Liquid Identities - Lynn Hershman Leeson, Identities of the 21st Century, Lehmbruck Museum, Duisburg, Germany
- 2016, Cyborgs and Self-Promotion, Cleveland Museum of Art, Cleveland, Ohio
- 2016, Lynn Hershman Leeson: Body Collage, Armory Gallery, Virginia Tech, Blacksburg, Virginia
- 2016, Lynn Hershman Leeson, Ruth C. Horton Gallery, Moss Arts Center, Virginia Tech, Blacksburg, Virginia
- 2017, Lynn Hershman Leeson: Civic Radar, Yerba Buena Center for the Arts, San Francisco, California
- 2017–2018, VertiGhost, Legion of Honor museum, Fine Arts Museums of San Francisco, San Francisco, California
- 2018, Lynn Hershman Leeson: A Manual for Automatons, Bionic Beings and Cyborgs, 1962-1982, Anglim Gilbert Gallery, San Francisco, California
- 2019, First Person Plural, Centro de Arte Dos de Mayo Comunidad de Madrid, Madrid, Spain
- 2019, Lorna, Thoma Foundation, Santa Fe, New Mexico
- 2021, Lynn Hershman Leeson: Twisted, New Museum, New York City, New York
- 2024, Anti-Aging, Bridget Donahue, New York City, New York

=== Group exhibitions ===
- 2013–2014, New Acquisitions in Photography, Museum of Modern Art (MoMa), New York City, New York
- 2013–2014, Dissident Futures, Yerba Buena Center for the Arts, San Francisco, California
- 2014, Post Speculation, P! gallery, New York City, New York
- 2014, Women: Seeing and Being Seen, Scott Nichols Gallery, San Francisco, California.
- 2019–2020, Manual Override, The Shed, New York City, New York

== Grants and awards ==
In 2023, Leeson received honorary awards from Creative Capital The Mill Valley Film Festival, The Contemporary Jewish Museum (San Francisco).

Leeson has been honored with grants from Creative Capital, The National Endowment for the Arts, Nathan Cummings Foundation, Siemens International Media Arts Award, Prix Ars Electronica, and Alfred P Sloan Foundation Prize for Writing and Directing. In 2009 she was the recipient of a John Simon Guggenheim Memorial Foundation Fellowship. Also in 2009, she received the SIGGRAPH Distinguished Artist Award. The Digital Art Museum in Berlin recognized her work with the d.velop digital award (ddaa) for Lifetime Achievement in the field of New Media in 2010. Her work was recently included in Arthur and Marilouise Kroker's Top Ten for the January 2013 issue of Artforum.

In 2014, IFP Pixel Market Prize went to The Infinity Engine starring Tilda Swinton, directed by Leeson in collaboration with producer Lisa Cortes, whose credits include the Academy Award and Sundance Film Festival winning film Precious. The Infinity Engine is an installation, film and online interactive website. The prize comprises a six-month fellowship at the Media Center and an invitation to participate in next year's No Borders programme.

Leeson was also featured in the Women's eNews "21 Leaders for the 21st Century" special in 2014 for her role in empowering young female artists to strengthen their artistic voices. Her documentary !W.A.R. raises awareness for the fact that the art world is a male-dominated realm and explores the many influential works of female artists over the decades.

In 2004, Stanford University Libraries acquired Hershman Leeson's working archive. Stanford also acquired a collection of the interviews compiled for Hershman Leeson's 2010 documentary !Women Art Revolution.

In 2018, The Women's Caucus for Art awarded Hershman Leeson with the Lifetime Achievement Award, in Los Angeles.

Lynn Hershman Leeson has been awarded a special mention from the Jury for her participation in the 59th International Art Exhibition of La Biennale di Venezia – The Milk of Dreams. The award was presented with the following motivation: “for indexing the cybernetic concerns that run through the exhibitions in an illuminating and powerful way that also includes visionary moments of her early practice that foresaw the influence of technology in our everyday lives.”

== Personal life ==
Hershman Leeson is based in San Francisco, California. In 1991, she married George Leeson, adding his last name to her own; some of her earlier work is still presented under the name Lynn Hershman.

Hershman Leeson's daughter, Dawn L. Hershman, is an oncologist who researches breast cancer at Columbia University. Hershman Leeson has two grandchildren, Noa and Eli.

== Sources ==
- Anon (2018). "Artist, Curator & Critic Interviews". !Women Art Revolution - Spotlight at Stanford. Archived from the original on March 26, 2018.
