= The Life and Times of Rosie the Riveter =

1980 film by Connie Field

- Directed by: Connie Field
- Produced by: Connie Field
- Starring: Wanita Allen; Gladys Belcher; Lyn Childs; Lola Weixel; Margaret Wright
- Cinematography: Cathy Zheutlin; Bonnie Friedman; Robert Handley; Emiko Omori
- Edited by: Lucy Massie Phenix; Connie Field
- Production company: Clarity Films
- Distributed by: First Run Features
- Release date: September 27, 1980 (re-released February 24, 2014)
- Running time: 65 min
- Language: English

The Life and Times of Rosie the Riveter is a 1980 documentary film and the first movie made by Connie Field, about the American women who went to work during World War II to do "men's jobs." In 1996, it was selected for preservation in the United States National Film Registry by the Library of Congress as being "culturally, historically, or aesthetically significant."

== Production ==
Connie Field got the idea for the film from a California Rosie the Riveter reunion, and, with grants from the National Endowment for the Humanities and other charitable sources, conducted interviews with many hundreds of women who had gone into war work. Out of these she chose five representatives—three black, two white—all marvelously lively, intelligent, and articulate women who recall their experiences with a mixture of pleasant nostalgia and detached bitterness.

The reminiscences are intercut with the realities of the period—old news, films, recruiting trailers, The March of Time clips, and pop songs such as "Rosie the Riveter." These often serve to highlight the disparities between how women were portrayed in wartime media and the actual experiences of these five women.

The film's title refers to "Rosie the Riveter", the cultural icon that represented women who worked the manufacturing plants which produced munitions and material during World War II.

== Reception and legacy ==
The Life and Times of Rosie the Riveter premiered at the New York Film Festival in 1980, which at that time was one of the most important film festivals in America, and went on to be screened at over 50 film festivals around the world. The film was released in movie theaters in the United States, England and Australia to rave reviews. The Los Angeles Times called it "warm, engaging and poignant" and went on to say "the film has that Studs Terkel-like ability to discover the extraordinary in seemingly ordinary people. Terrific." Of the Rosies themselves The London Times said "the resilience, spirit and humour of Connie Field's indomitable heroines sends you out elated and loving them."

The film earned fifteen international awards for Best Documentary, was named "One of the Ten Best Films of the Year" by a number of publications, including the Village Voice and Film Comment, and was voted "Best Independent Feature of the Year" in American Film magazine. It was originally broadcast on PBS's American Experience and numerous international TV stations such as Channel 4 in England and the South African Broadcasting Corporation. The film has been in active distribution for over 30 years.

The Life and Times of Rosie the Riveter was preserved by the Academy Film Archive, in conjunction with the Library of Congress in 2013.

== Awards and nominations ==
- Best Documentary nomination, British Academy of Film and Television Arts, 1981
- winner, Gold Hugo, Chicago International Film Festival, 1980
- winner, Golden Marazzo, Festival dei Popoli, 1980
- winner, Gold Award, Houston International Film Festival, 1980
- winner, CINE Golden Eagle, 1981
- winner, Golden Athena, Athens Festival
- winner, Finalist Award, National Educational Film Festival, 1982
- winner, Blue Ribbon Award, American Film Festival, 1981
- winner, John Grierson Award, American Film Festival, Educational Film Library Association

== See also ==
- Rosies of the North (1999)
- The Atomic Cafe (1982)
- Freedom on My Mind (1994)
