= 39th British Academy Film Awards =

1986 film awards ceremony

- Date: 16 March 1986
- Site: Grosvenor House Hotel
- Hosted by: Michael Aspel

Highlights
- Best Film: The Purple Rose of Cairo
- Best Actor: William Hurt; Kiss of the Spider Woman
- Best Actress: Peggy Ashcroft; A Passage to India
- Most awards: Amadeus (4)
- Most nominations: Amadeus and A Passage to India (9)

The 39th British Academy Film Awards, more commonly known as the BAFTAs, took place on 16 March 1986 at the Grosvenor House Hotel in London, honouring the best national and foreign films of 1985. Presented by the British Academy of Film and Television Arts, accolades were handed out for the best feature-length film and documentaries of any nationality that were screened at British cinemas in 1985.

There are no records showing any nominations, or a winner, for the BAFTA Award for Best Direction at this ceremony.

Robert Greenhut and Woody Allen's The Purple Rose of Cairo won awards for Best Film and Original Screenplay. William Hurt and Peggy Ashcroft took home Best Actor and Actress, whilst Denholm Elliott and Rosanna Arquette won in the supporting categories.

The ceremony was hosted by Michael Aspel for the second time.

== Winners and nominees ==
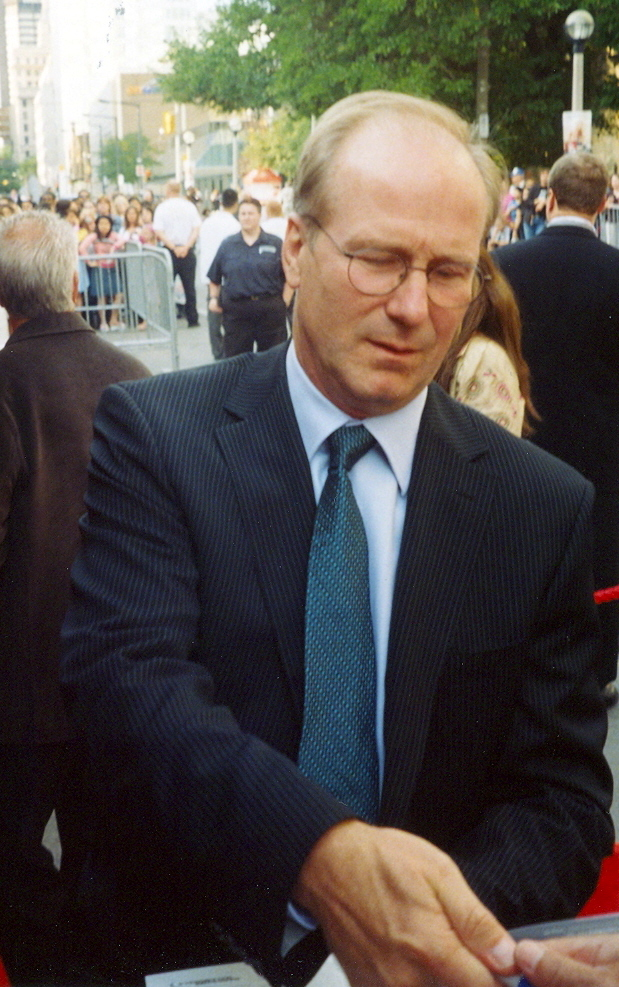
William Hurt, Best Actor winner

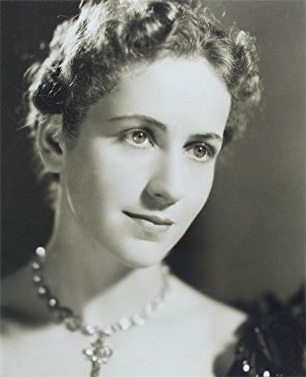
Peggy Ashcroft, Best Actress winner

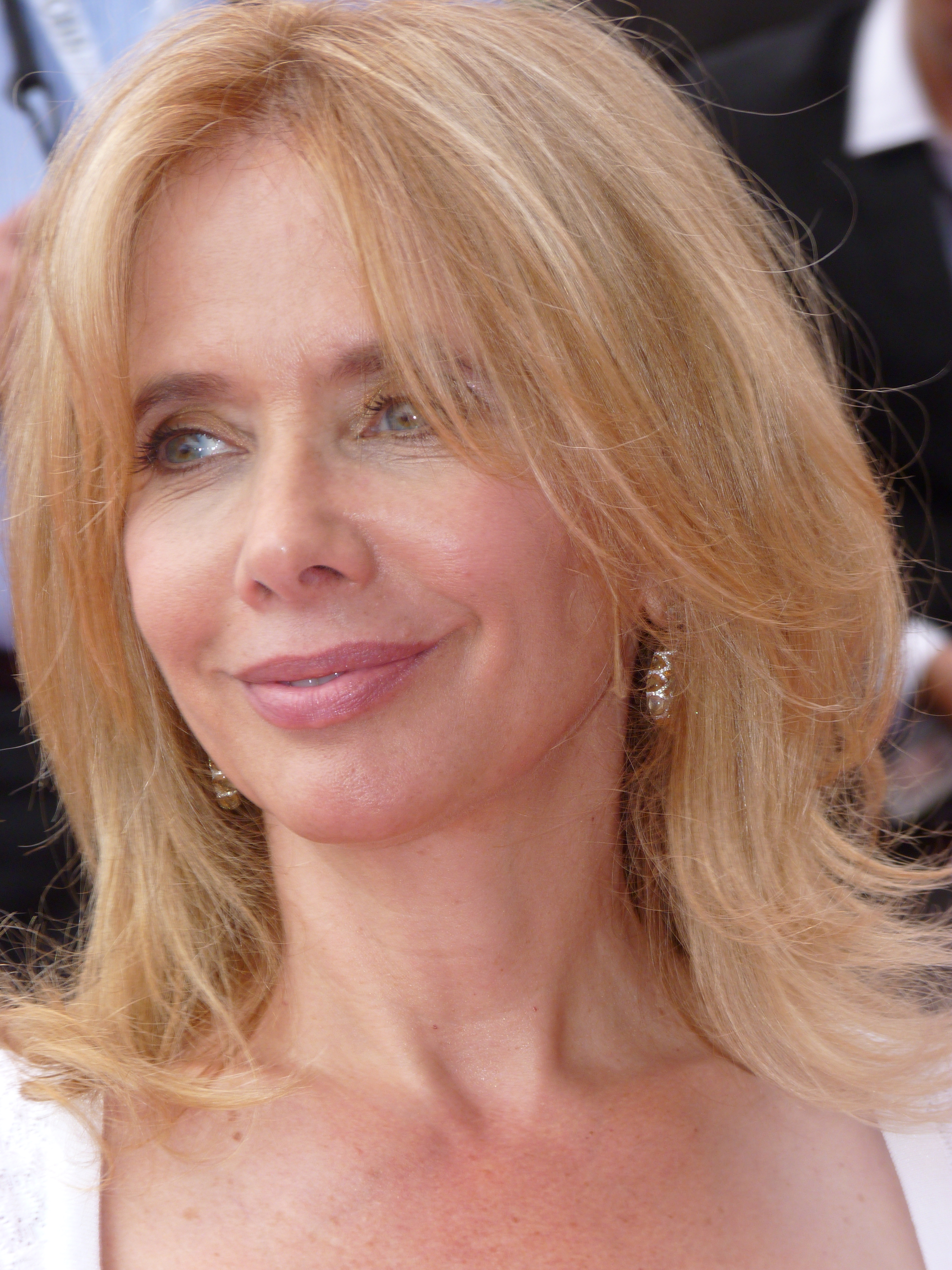
Rosanna Arquette, Best Supporting Actress winner

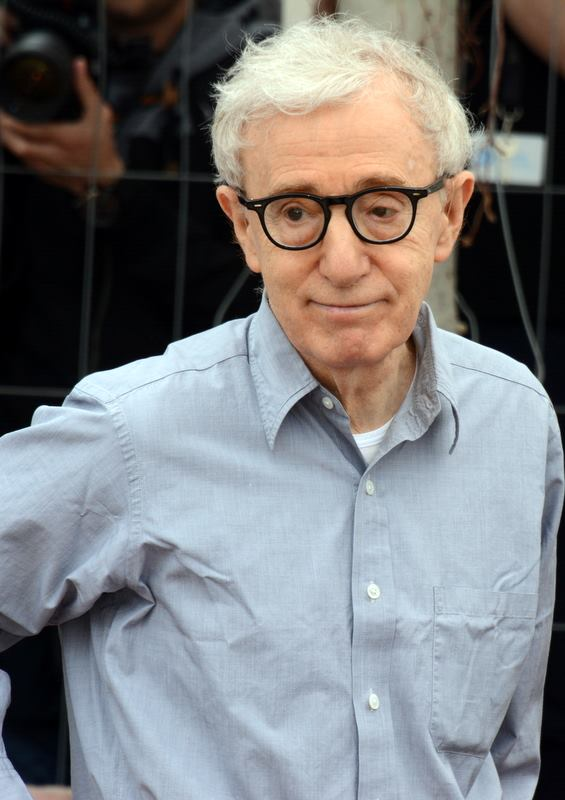
Woody Allen, Best Original Screenplay winner

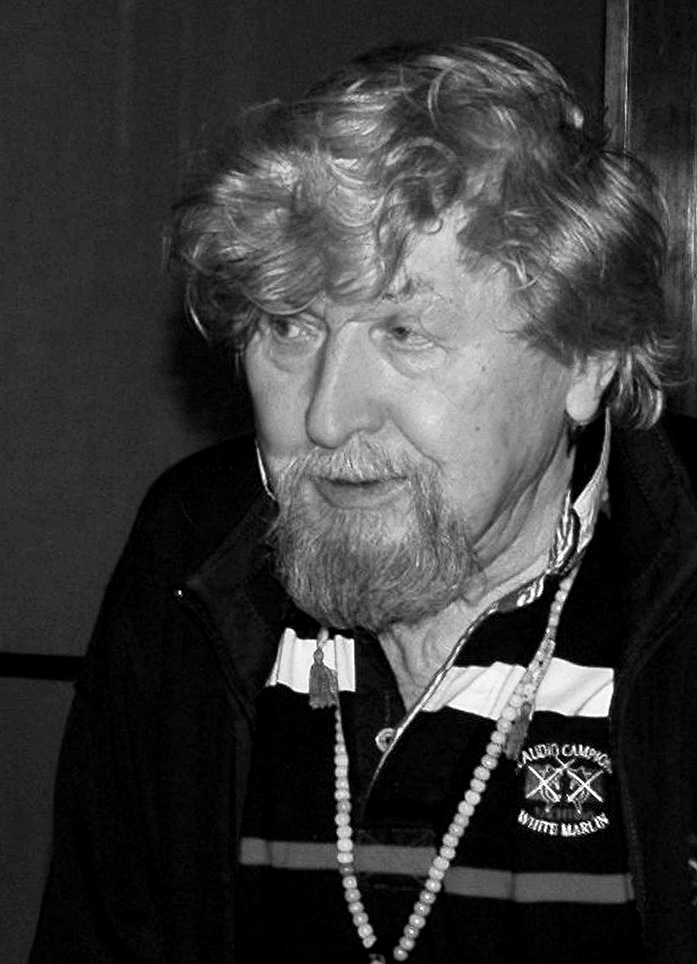
Miroslav Ondříček, Best Cinematography winner

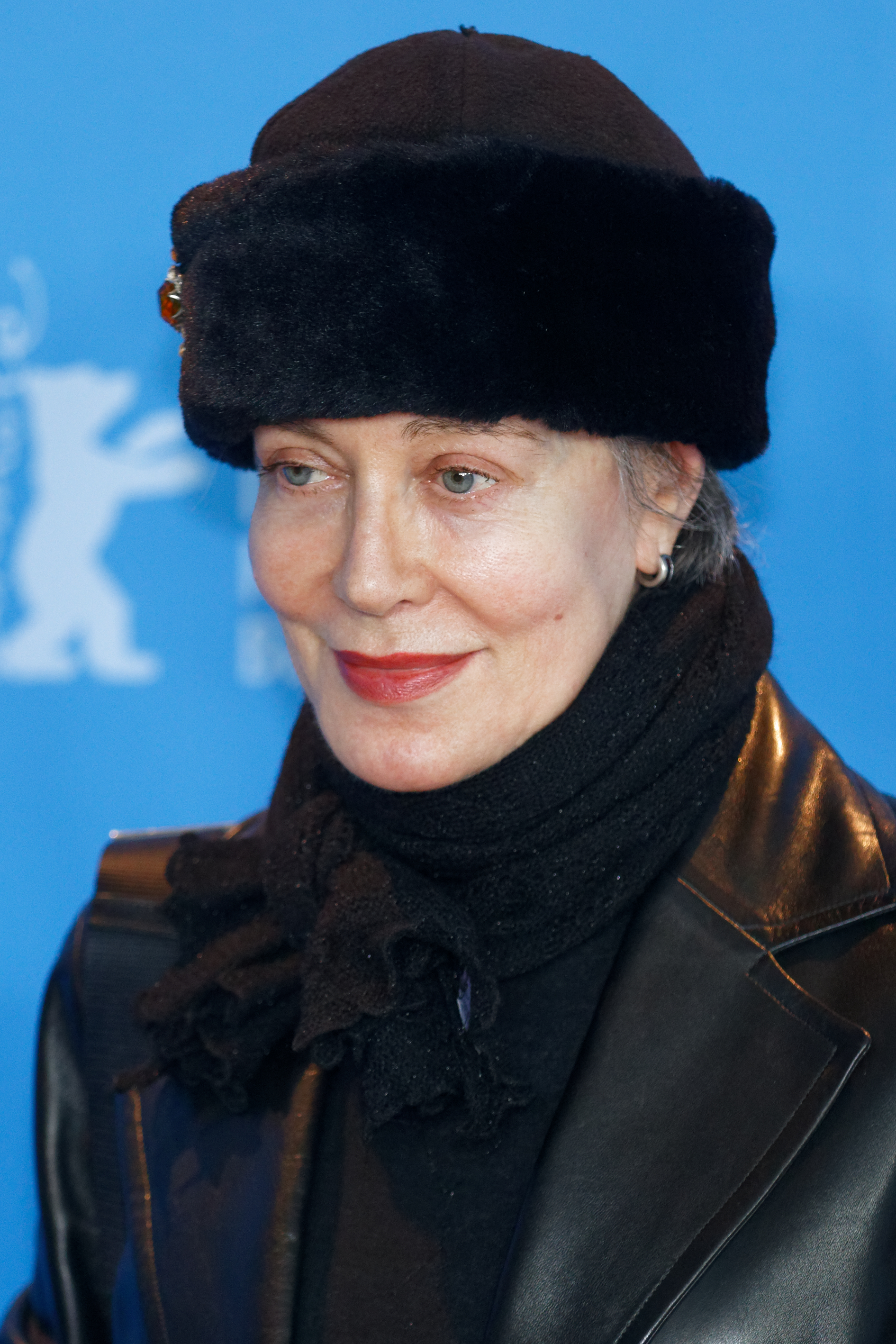
Milena Canonero, Best Costume Design winner

=== BAFTA Fellowship ===
- **Steven Spielberg**

=== Outstanding British Contribution to Cinema ===
- **Sydney Samuelson**

=== Awards ===
Winners are listed first and highlighted in boldface.

**Best Film**: **The Purple Rose of Cairo – Robert Greenhut and Woody Allen**; Amadeus – Saul Zaentz and Miloš Forman; Back to the Future – Bob Gale, Neil Canton and Robert Zemeckis; A Passage to India – John Knatchbull, Richard Goodwin and David Lean; Witness – Edward S. Feldman and Peter Weir
**Best Actor in a Leading Role**: **William Hurt – Kiss of the Spider Woman as Luis Molina**; F. Murray Abraham – Amadeus as Antonio Salieri; Harrison Ford – Witness as Detective John Book; Victor Banerjee – A Passage to India as Doctor Aziz Ahmed	**Best Actress in a Leading Role**: **Peggy Ashcroft – A Passage to India as Mrs. Moore**; Alexandra Pigg – Letter to Brezhnev as Elaine; Kelly McGillis – Witness as Rachel Lapp; Mia Farrow – The Purple Rose of Cairo as Cecilia
**Best Actor in a Supporting Role**: **Denholm Elliott – Defence of the Realm as Vernon Bayliss**; James Fox – A Passage to India as Richard Fielding; John Gielgud – Plenty as Sir Leonard Darwin; Saeed Jaffrey – My Beautiful Laundrette as Nasser Ali	**Best Actress in a Supporting Role**: **Rosanna Arquette – Desperately Seeking Susan as Roberta Glass**; Anjelica Huston – Prizzi's Honor as Maerose Prizzi; Judi Dench – Wetherby as Marcia Pilborough; Tracey Ullman – Plenty as Alice Park
**Best Original Screenplay**: **The Purple Rose of Cairo – Woody Allen**; Back to the Future – Robert Zemeckis and Bob Gale; My Beautiful Laundrette – Hanif Kureishi; Witness – Earl W. Wallace and William Kelley	**Best Adapted Screenplay**: **Prizzi's Honor – Richard Condon and Janet Roach**; Amadeus – Peter Shaffer; A Passage to India – David Lean; The Shooting Party – Julian Bond
**Best Cinematography**: **Amadeus – Miroslav Ondříček**; The Emerald Forest – Philippe Rousselot; A Passage to India – Ernest Day; Witness – John Seale	**Best Costume Design**: **The Cotton Club – Milena Canonero**; Amadeus – Theodor Pištěk; Legend – Charles Knode; A Passage to India – Judy Moorcroft
**Best Editing**: **Amadeus – Nena Danevic and Michael Chandler**; Back to the Future – Arthur Schmidt and Harry Keramidas; A Chorus Line – John Bloom; Witness – Thom Noble	**Best Makeup and Hair**: **Amadeus – Paul LeBlanc and Dick Smith**; The Emerald Forest – Peter Frampton, Paul Engelen, Anna Dryhurst, Luis Michelotti and Beth Presares; Legend – Peter Robb-King and Rob Bottin; Mask – Michael Westmore
**Best Original Music**: **Witness – Maurice Jarre**; Beverly Hills Cop – Harold Faltermeyer; The Emerald Forest – Junior Homrich and Brian Gascoigne; A Passage to India – Maurice Jarre	**Best Production Design**: **Brazil – Norman Garwood**; Amadeus – Patrizia von Brandenstein; Back to the Future – Lawrence G. Paull; A Passage to India – John Box
**Best Sound**: **Amadeus – John Nutt, Chris Newman and Mark Berger**; Carmen – Hugues Darmois, Harald Maury, Dominique Hennequin and Bernard Le Roux; A Chorus Line – Jonathan Bates, Chris Newman and Gerry Humphreys; The Cotton Club – Edward Beyer, Jack Jacobsen and David Carroll	**Best Special Visual Effects**: **Brazil – George Gibbs and Richard Conway**; Back to the Future – Kevin Pike and Ken Ralston; Legend – Nick Allder and Peter Voysey; The Purple Rose of Cairo – Greenberg Associates
**Best Documentary**: **Omnibus: Leonard Berstein's West Side Story – Christopher Swann**; Marilyn Monroe: Say Goodbye to the President – Christopher Olgiati; David Lean: A Life in Film – Nigel Wattis; The Frozen Ocean: Part 1 – Kingdom of the Ice Bear – Mike Salisbury and Hugh Miles	**Best Film Not in the English Language**: **Colonel Redl – Manfred Durniok and István Szabó**; Carmen – Patrice Ledoux and Francesco Rosi; Dim Sum: A Little Bit of Heart – Tom Sternberg, Wayne Wang and Danny Yung; Subway – Luc Besson and Francois Ruggieri
**Best Short Animation**: **Alias the Jester – Brian Cosgrove and Mark Hall**; Danger Mouse – Brian Cosgrove and Mark Hall; SuperTed – David Edward and Mike Young; The Wind in the Willows – Mark Hall and Brian Cosgrove	**Best Short Film**: **Careless Talk – Noella Smith**; One for My Baby – Chris Fallon; The Woman Who Married Clark Gable – Thaddeus O'Sullivan

== Statistics ==
Films that received multiple nominations
Nominations	Film
9	Amadeus
9	A Passage to India
7	Witness
5	Back to the Future
4	The Purple Rose of Cairo
3	The Emerald Forest
3	Legend
2	Brazil
2	Carmen
2	A Chorus Line
2	The Cotton Club
2	My Beautiful Laundrette
2	Plenty
2	Prizzi's Honor

Films that received multiple awards
Awards	Film
4	Amadeus
2	Brazil
2	The Purple Rose of Cairo

== See also ==
- 58th Academy Awards
- 11th César Awards
- 38th Directors Guild of America Awards
- 43rd Golden Globe Awards
- 6th Golden Raspberry Awards
- 1st Independent Spirit Awards
- 12th Saturn Awards
- 38th Writers Guild of America Awards
