= The Most Dangerous Man in America =

2009 documentary film by Judith Ehrlich and Rick Goldsmith

The Most Dangerous Man in America: Daniel Ellsberg and the Pentagon Papers
- Directed by: Judith Ehrlich; Rick Goldsmith
- Written by: Michael Chandler; Judith Ehrlich; Rick Goldsmith; Lawrence Lerew
- Produced by: Judith Ehrlich; Rick Goldsmith
- Starring: Daniel Ellsberg
- Cinematography: Vicente Franco; Dan Krauss
- Edited by: Michael Chandler; Rick Goldsmith; Lawrence Lerew
- Music by: Blake Leyh
- Distributed by: First Run Features
- Release dates: 11 September 2009 (Toronto); 5 February 2010 (United States)
- Running time: 92 minutes
- Country: United States
- Language: English

The Most Dangerous Man in America: Daniel Ellsberg and the Pentagon Papers is a 2009 American documentary film directed by Judith Ehrlich and Rick Goldsmith. The film follows Daniel Ellsberg and explores the events leading up to the 1971 publication of the Pentagon Papers, which exposed the top-secret military history of the United States' involvement in Vietnam.

The film was shown on the PBS series POV in 2010, for which it earned a Peabody Award.

== Reception ==
=== Critical response ===
In a review for The New York Times, Mike Hale writes that the film "conscientiously notes the viewpoints of those who believe that Mr. Ellsberg betrayed his country or his former colleagues at the Defense Department" and the filmmakers "concentrate on their portrait of Mr. Ellsberg, who emerges as a complex and difficult man whose principles, whether you agree with them or not, can’t be denied." Roger Ebert writes, "It is a skillful, well-made film, although, since Ellsberg is the narrator, it doesn't probe him very deeply. We see his version of himself."

Mick LaSalle writes in a review for The San Francisco Chronicle, "The film is packed with stories, from numerous talking heads, including Ellsberg. A wealth of information is conveyed with complete clarity." In a review for The Journal of American History, Stephen J. Whitfield notes "the most dangerous man in America" was a moniker "bestowed by Henry Kissinger, who had admired his Harvard University colleague's pioneering work in decision theory. But the film commits the unpardonable sin of leaving the title unexplained."

In a review for NPR, Mark Jenkins writes that the filmmakers "sometimes rely on Errol Morris-style reconstructions of events, which are less deft than Morris'. Distractingly, they also use sketchy animation for a few sequences." In a review for Variety, Ronnie Scheib writes, "While a present-day Ellsberg complains that the massive number of bombs dropped on Vietnam, which he repeatedly mentioned in press conferences back then, was never duly reported, Ehrlich and Goldsmith redress that silence with a bombardment of newsreel images of aerial destruction."

The Most Dangerous Man in America has an approval rating of 96% on review aggregator website Rotten Tomatoes, based on 56 reviews, and an average rating of 7.84/10. Metacritic assigned the film a weighted average score of 75 out of 100, based on 18 critics, indicating "generally favorable reviews".

=== Awards and nominations ===
==== Nominated ====
- Academy Award 2010 – Best Documentary Feature

==== Won ====
International Documentary Film Festival Amsterdam

- Special Jury Award

Palm Springs International Film Festival

- Audience Award Best Documentary

National Board of Review, USA

- Freedom of Expression Award

Mill Valley Film Festival, USA

- Audience Award Best Documentary

San Luis Obispo International Film Festival, USA

- Best In Fest

Boulder International Film Festival, USA

- Best Feature Documentary

It's All True Film Festival, Brazil

- Audience Award Best Documentary

Fresno Film Festival, USA

- Audience Award Best Documentary

Sydney Film Festival, Australia

- Best Documentary

Mendocino Film Festival, USA

- Audience Choice Award Co-Winner

Docaviv Film Festival, Israel

- Special Jury Mention

Traverse City Film Festival, USA

- Audience Award Best Documentary

American Historical Association, USA

- John O'Connor Film Award

History Makers Award, USA

- Best History Production

Organization of American Historians, USA

- Erik Barnouw Award

== See also ==
- The Pentagon Papers (2003 film)
- The Post (2017 film)
