= Miroslav Sekera =

Czech pianist

Miroslav Sekera is a Czech pianist who has won numerous awards, including first prize awards in the Chopin Competition at Marianske Lazne and The Johannes Brahms International Competition at Portschach, Austria, and from the Prague Academy of Music.

Mirek was a child actor who played the part of the young Wolfgang Amadeus Mozart in the 1984 film Amadeus. He is seen in only one short but important scene in which he is playing the harpsichord and violin for the Pope in the Vatican.

== Competitions ==
Chopin Competition at Mariánské Láznĕ - First Prize (1991)
National Competition of Czech Conservatories - First Prize
Baden Competition - Best Performance of a work by Leoš Janáček
Prague Academy of Music Arts - First Prize (1999)
Johannes Brahms International Competition - First Prize (2002)

== Recordings ==
Augury of Amadeus - unknown
Composer: Various

What A Piece Of Work Is Man - Albany Records 2005 Discography
Composer: Joseph Summer

Shall I Compare Thee to a Summer's Day? - Albany Records 2006 Discography
Composer: Joseph Summer

So Many Journeys - Albany Records 2009 Discography
Composer: Joseph Summer

== See also ==
- Mark Hamill
- Tom Hulce
- Matt Kjar
