= Nena Danevic =

American film editor

- Occupation: Film editor
- Years active: 1981–1989

Nena Danevic (born c. 1955) is a film editor who was nominated at the 57th Academy Awards for Best Film Editing. She was nominated for Amadeus. She shared her nomination with Michael Chandler. She did win at the 39th British Academy Film Awards for Best Editing. Also for Amadeus with Michael Chandler. She also won at the American Cinema Editors awards.

Danevic was born in Navesink, New Jersey. She is married to American film distributor Tom Bernard.
