= Forever Activists =

- Directed by: Connie Field; Judith Montell
- Written by: Yasha Aginsky; Phil Cousineau; Judith Montell
- Produced by: Judith Montell
- Narrated by: Ronnie Gilbert
- Edited by: Yasha Aginsky
- Distributed by: Tara Releasing
- Release date: 1990
- Running time: 60 minutes
- Country: United States
- Language: English

Forever Activists: Stories from the Veterans of the Abraham Lincoln Brigade is a 1990 documentary film by Connie Field and Judith Montell that shares interviews with seven American veterans of the Spanish Civil War who fought for the Loyalist cause during the war and went on to live lives of activism.

== Accolades ==
It was nominated for an Academy Award for Best Documentary Feature.

== Production ==
It was narrated by Ronnie Gilbert.

The film makes the point that for many of the men and women who fought in the Spanish Civil War it was just one of a series of continuing social struggles that they believed in. The film's highlight is a reunion of the veterans in Spain in 1986, on the 50th anniversary of the war's outbreak.

== See also ==
- Abraham Lincoln Brigade
- Jewish volunteers in the Spanish Civil War
- Spanish Civil War
- List of American films of 1990

Other documentaries about Jewish activism

- Professional Revolutionary
