= Endesha Ida Mae Holland =

American activist, and playwright

- Born: August 29, 1944; Greenwood, Mississippi, US
- Died: January 25, 2006 (aged 61); Santa Monica, California, US
- Education: PhD. in American studies, University of Minnesota 1986
- Occupations: Activist, playwright, scholar
- Notable work: From the Mississippi Delta

Endesha Ida Mae Holland (August 29, 1944 – January 25, 2006) was an American scholar, playwright, and civil rights activist.

== Early life ==
Born in Greenwood, Mississippi, Holland never knew her father and was raped at the age of 11. Later she was expelled from school and became a prostitute.

== SNCC ==
Upon hearing that members of the Student Nonviolent Coordinating Committee (SNCC) had come to Greenwood, Holland sought out one of the male members in hopes of soliciting him for prostitution. The man, however, led her directly to the committee's office hoping to convince her to become involved. On witnessing the office operations, Holland found herself deeply impressed by the sight of African-Americans conducting themselves in such a businesslike manner and she began volunteering there.

Holland's mother adamantly opposed her involvement with the SNCC, fearing reprisals from members of Greenwood's white community. In 1965 a fire broke out in the family's home, killing Holland's mother; Holland said afterward that she believed the Ku Klux Klan had indeed firebombed the house in retaliation for her civil rights work. In all, she was jailed thirteen times for her civil rights work. She got a high school equivalency diploma, encouraged by her colleagues in the civil rights movement. She studied at the University of Minnesota beginning that year, where she helped start an African-American studies department, and initiated Women Helping Offenders (WHO), a prison-aid program.

== Education ==
In 1979 Holland earned a bachelor's degree in African-American studies from the University of Minnesota, followed by a master's degree in American Studies in 1984 and a PhD. in American studies in 1986.

In 1981 she was awarded the $1,000 National Lorraine Hansberry Award for the second-best play of 1981. In 1983, she took Endesha as her first name in order to honor her African heritage. She taught at the State University of New York, Buffalo from 1985 to 1993. She was a professor of theater at the University of Southern California, retiring in 2003. She died at a nursing home in Santa Monica, California, from complications of ataxia.

== Arts ==
She was the author of six plays, and was most famous for writing From the Mississippi Delta, which was performed by the Negro Ensemble Company at the Goodman Theater in Chicago and at the Young Vic in London. She also wrote a memoir of the same name, published by Simon & Schuster in 1997.

A 1998 short documentary, Dr. Endesha Ida Mae Holland, was made about her. She was interviewed as part of the 1994 feature documentary film Freedom on My Mind.

== Family life ==
Holland was married three times; each union ended in divorce. Holland has one child, Cedric Holland.
