= Connie Field =

American documentary filmmaker

Connie Field is an American film director known for her work in documentaries.

Her works include The Life and Times of Rosie the Riveter (1980), Forever Activists (1990), Freedom on My Mind (1994) and Have You Heard from Johannesburg (2010).

Field's works have received numerous awards and nominations. Among other recognitions, Freedom on My Mind won the Grand Jury Prize for Best Documentary at the 1994 Sundance Film Festival, and was nominated for an Academy Award for Best Documentary Feature at the 67th Academy Awards; Have You Heard from Johannesburg won the Primetime Emmy Award for Exceptional Merit in Documentary Filmmaking at the 64th Primetime Emmy Awards.

== Early life ==
Field was born to a Jewish family in Washington, D.C. in 1941and was a full-time organizer for social causes in the late 1960s and 1970s in Boston and New York City. She was a journalist for The Old Mole, a radical New Left-oriented underground newspaper and a member of Boston Newsreel, one of a group of independent filmmaking and distribution organizations around the country, which made over 60 documentaries in conjunction with grass-roots organizers to serve as catalysts for social change. Upon moving to New York City, she worked for The People's Coalition for Peace and Justice and the Indochina Peace Campaign, both national organizations working for a just end to the Vietnam War. During this time, she discovered a history never taught her generation of the many struggles for social equality achieved by previous generations. Both the importance of this discovery and her commitment to social justice would shape the rest of her life and work.

== Film career ==
Field's first film, The Life and Times of Rosie the Riveter, told the story of American women who went to work during World War II to do "men's jobs." It has been selected by the United States National Film Registry of the Library of Congress for preservation as a significant component of America's film heritage.

She was co-director of the documentary Forever Activists (1990), an Oscar-nominated film produced and directed by Judy Montell about the lifelong activism of seven members of the Abraham Lincoln Brigade, the American contingent who fought on the Loyalist side in the Spanish Civil War.

Freedom on My Mind (1994) premiered at the Sundance Film Festival and is a history of the Mississippi Voter Registration Project during the Civil Rights Movement which culminated in Freedom Summer in 1964. It was nominated for an Academy Award and won the Grand Jury Prize for Best Documentary at the Sundance Film Festival. Variety called it "a landmark documentary that chronicles the most tumultuous and significant years in the history of the civil rights movement. A must see". while The Chicago Tribune gave similar praise. It was also broadcast on PBS's American Experience.

Have You Heard from Johannesburg (2010) is a seven-film series covering the struggle of the global anti-apartheid movement to end apartheid in South Africa. It has been called "a monumental chronicle not just of one nation and its hideous regime, but of the second half of the 20th century." The series won a Primetime Emmy Award for its broadcast on PBS's Independent Lens in 2012, and was awarded Best Limited Series by the International Documentary Association, and named Best Documentary of 2010 by The Village Voice and Time Out New York.

Other work includes ¡Salud! (2007), a documentary on Cuba's role in the struggle for global health equity and the complex realities confronting the movement to make healthcare everyone’s birthright.

== Selected filmography ==
- The Life and Times of Rosie the Riveter (1980)
- Forever Activists: Stories from the Veterans of the Abraham Lincoln Brigade (1990)
- Freedom on My Mind (1994)
- ¡Salud! (2007)
- Have You Heard from Johannesburg (2010)
- Al Helm: Martin Luther King in Palestine (2013)
- Oliver Tambo: Have You Heard from Johannesburg (2018)
- The Whistleblower of My Lai (2018)

== Awards and nominations ==
The Life and Times of Rosie the Riveter

- Best Documentary nomination, British Academy of Film and Television Arts, 1981
- winner, Gold Hugo, Chicago International Film Festival, 1980
- winner, Golden Marazzo, Festival dei Popoli, 1980
- winner, Gold Award, Houston International Film Festival, 1980
- winner, CINE Golden Eagle, 1981
- winner, Golden Athena, Athens Festival
- winner, Finalist Award, National Educational Film Festival, 1982
- winner, Blue Ribbon Award, American Film Festival, 1981
- winner, John Grierson Award, American Film Festival, Educational Film Library Association

Freedom on My Mind

- Best Documentary Feature nomination, The 67th Academy Awards, 1994
- winner, Documentary Feature Grand Jury Prize, Sundance Film Festival, 1994
- winner, Best of Northern California, National Educational Film Festival, 1994
- winner, Erik Barnouw Award, Organization of American Historians, 1995
- winner, John O’Connor Award, American Historical Association
- winner, Bronze Award, WorldFest Houston, 1994
- winner, Distinguished Documentary Award, International Documentary Association, 1994
- winner, National Educational Association Award for Excellence in the Advancement of Learning through Broadcasting, 1996
- winner, CINE Golden Eagle, 1996

¡Salud!

- winner, Audience Award, Pan African Film Festival, 2007
- winner, Henry Hampton Award for Excellence in Film & Media, Council on Foundations, 2008
- winner, Film Award, American Medical Students Association, 2007

Have You Heard from Johannesburg

- winner, Primetime Emmy Award for Exceptional Merit in Documentary Filmmaking, The Academy of Television Arts and Sciences, 2012
- winner, Best Limited Series, International Documentary Association, 2010
- winner, Gold Hugo for Best Documentary Series, Chicago International Film Festival Hugo Television Awards, 2012
- Best Documentary Feature nomination, BFI London Film Festival, 2009
- winner, Best Documentary Feature, Vancouver International Film Festival, 2006
- winner, Best Documentary Feature, Pan African Film Festival, 2007

Al Helm: Martin Luther King in Palestine

- winner, CrossCurrents Foundation Justice Matters Award, Washington DC International Film Festival, 2014
- winner, Audience Favorite – Active Cinema, Mill Valley Film Festival, 2013
- winner, CINE Golden Eagle, 2012
