= Amadeus (film) =

1984 film directed by Miloš Forman

- Theatrical release poster by Peter Sís
- Directed by: Miloš Forman
- Screenplay by: Peter Shaffer
- Based on: Amadeus by Peter Shaffer
- Produced by: Saul Zaentz
- Starring: F. Murray Abraham; Tom Hulce; Elizabeth Berridge; Simon Callow; Roy Dotrice; Christine Ebersole; Jeffrey Jones; Charles Kay
- Cinematography: Miroslav Ondříček
- Edited by: Nena Danevic; Michael Chandler
- Production company: The Saul Zaentz Company
- Distributed by: Orion Pictures (United States); Thorn EMI Screen Entertainment (International)
- Release dates: September 6, 1984 (Los Angeles); September 19, 1984 (United States)
- Running time: 161 minutes
- Country: United States
- Language: English
- Budget: $18 million
- Box office: $90 million

Amadeus is a 1984 American epic drama film directed by Miloš Forman. Peter Shaffer adapted it from his 1979 stage play, inspired by Alexander Pushkin's 1830 play Mozart and Salieri. Shaffer described it as a "fantasia on [a real-life] theme", as it imagines an orchestral rivalry between two 18th-century Vienna composers, Wolfgang Amadeus Mozart (Tom Hulce) and Antonio Salieri (F. Murray Abraham). Salieri struggles to reconcile his professional admiration for Mozart with his jealous hatred, and resolves to ruin Mozart's career as his form of vengeance against God.

Amadeus received its world premiere in Los Angeles on September 6, 1984. It was released by Orion Pictures thirteen days later to widespread critical acclaim and box office success, grossing over $90 million. It was nominated for 53 awards and won 40, including 8 Academy Awards (including Best Picture), four BAFTA Awards, and four Golden Globe Awards (including Best Motion Picture – Drama). Abraham and Hulce were both nominated for the Academy Award for Best Actor, with Abraham winning. In 1998, the American Film Institute ranked it 53rd on its 100 Years... 100 Movies list. In 2019, the film was selected for preservation in the United States National Film Registry by the Library of Congress as being "culturally, historically, or aesthetically significant".

== Plot ==
In 1823, aged composer Antonio Salieri attempts suicide and is committed to a psychiatric hospital. He claims that he murdered Wolfgang Amadeus Mozart. Father Vogler, a young Catholic priest, encourages Salieri to confess his sins before God. After Vogler fails to recognize him, Salieri plays three old melodies to jog his memory. Vogler cannot recognize the first two (which Salieri wrote) but is relieved to recognize the third (Eine kleine Nachtmusik) at once. Salieri peevishly reveals that Mozart wrote it.

Salieri begins his confession by saying he grew up hearing stories about the child prodigy Mozart. In his youth, Salieri was in love with music but was forbidden by his father to study the craft. Salieri proposed that if God made him a famous musician like Mozart, he would give God his faithfulness, chastity, and diligence. Salieri's father soon dies, which he interprets as a sign that God has accepted his vow. By 1774, Salieri became court composer to Holy Roman Emperor Joseph II in Vienna. However, he has enough taste to know that Emperor Joseph has no ear for music, though Salieri prides himself on the popularity of his work.

Salieri understands that Mozart is the better composer but is shocked to discover, upon their first meeting, that Mozart is obscene, immature, and dissolute. He also learns that Mozart never needs to pen a second draft of his music, implying divine inspiration. (Note: The director's cut adds that Mozart slept with one of Salieri's favorite singers, enraging the emotionally possessive Salieri.) Salieri cannot fathom why God would choose a reprobate like Mozart as his earthly instrument. Salieri renounces God and vows to take revenge on him by destroying Mozart.

Mozart's work is ahead of its time, and he struggles to find employment in Vienna. He spends himself into debt, alarming his wife Constanze. (Note: In a deleted scene from the director's cut, Mozart quits his side job tutoring the daughter of a wealthy man after realizing that the man is primarily interested in training his rowdy dogs to be quiet when listening to music. It is implied that Salieri got Mozart the job, knowing that Mozart would hate it.) Salieri and Mozart bond over their shared contempt for Emperor Joseph's lack of taste, but Mozart is unimpressed by Salieri's populist work, which causes Salieri great pain.

Mozart boldly adapts the subversive play The Marriage of Figaro into a comedic opera. Salieri rejoices, thinking Mozart's career is ruined, but Mozart stuns Salieri by convincing the Emperor to approve the project. The Emperor, however, finds the opera boring, and it is soon canceled. Eventually, Mozart's father, Leopold, dies. In response to criticisms and his grief, Mozart composes Don Giovanni, a dark, serious opera. Salieri is entranced but vindictively gets that opera canceled, too. Renouncing Vienna's artistic establishment, Mozart agrees to write The Magic Flute for a commoners' theater against Constanze's wishes.

After watching Don Giovanni five times, Salieri realizes that the dead commander who accuses Giovanni of sin represents Mozart's inferiority complex towards his father. Posing as an anonymous patron, in a costume Leopold had worn to a masquerade ball, Salieri persuades the unstable and debt-ridden Mozart to accept a commission for a Requiem Mass. Salieri plans to kill Mozart, claim the Requiem as his own, and premiere it at Mozart's funeral, forcing God to listen as Salieri is acclaimed. Mozart overworks himself, juggling The Magic Flute and the Requiem. Constanze, who wants him to focus on the Requiem but fears his erratic behavior, leaves with their son Karl. Although The Magic Flute is a success, Mozart collapses from exhaustion before he can finish conducting the opera.

Desperate to complete his plan but also desperate for more of Mozart's heavenly music, Salieri begs the bedridden Mozart to keep writing the Requiem. He takes dictation from Mozart throughout the night, during which he comes to terms with Mozart's superior talent. Mozart thanks Salieri for his friendship, and Salieri admits that Mozart is the greatest composer he knows.

Constanze returns around dawn and attempts to kick Salieri out of the apartment, locking the Requiem away before he can steal it. (Note: This refers to a subplot from the director's cut concerning Salieri's bad relationship with Constanze. Salieri had previously encouraged Constanze to offer him sexual favors in exchange for helping Mozart's career. He ultimately decided against it, but nonetheless humiliated Constanze by calling in his attendant to show the partially nude Constanze out. This moment causes Constanze to hate Salieri. When she kicks Salieri out of the apartment at the end of the film, she bitterly remarks that she does not have a servant to evict him.) As Salieri protests, they are shocked to discover that Mozart has died. Due to his debts, Mozart is buried in a pauper's grave.

Back in 1823, Vogler is too shaken to absolve Salieri, who surmises that God would rather destroy his beloved Mozart than allow Salieri to share in Mozart's glory. As Salieri is wheeled down a hallway, he proclaims himself the patron saint of mediocrities. He absolves the asylum's other patients of their inadequacies as Mozart's laughter rings in the air.

== Cast ==
- F. Murray Abraham as Antonio Salieri
  - Martin Cavani as young Salieri
- Tom Hulce as Wolfgang Amadeus Mozart
  - Miroslav Sekera as young Mozart
- Elizabeth Berridge as Constanze Mozart
- Roy Dotrice as Leopold Mozart
- Simon Callow as Emanuel Schikaneder
- Christine Ebersole as Caterina Cavalieri
- Jeffrey Jones as Emperor Joseph II
- Charles Kay as Count Orsini-Rosenberg
- Kenneth McMillan as Michael Schlumberg (Director's Cut)
- Kenny Baker as Parody Commendatore
- Lisabeth Bartlett as Papagena
- Barbara Bryne as Frau Weber – Mozart's scandalous landlady and later mother-in-law.
- Roderick Cook as Count von Strack
- Milan Demjanenko as Karl Mozart
- Peter DiGesu as Francesco Salieri
- Marta Jarolímková as Archduchess Elisabeth, the niece of Emperor Joseph II of Austria and an archduchess of the Austrian Empire.
- Michele Esposito as Salieri's student (Director's Cut)
- Richard Frank as Father Vogler
- Patrick Hines as Kapellmeister Giuseppe Bonno
- Nicholas Kepros as Count Hieronymus von Colloredo, Prince-Archbishop of Salzburg
- Philip Lenkowsky as Salieri's Servant
- Herman Meckler as Priest
- Jonathan Moore as Baron van Swieten
- Cynthia Nixon as Lorl, Mozart's maid
- Brian Pettifer as Hospital Attendant
- Vincent Schiavelli as Salieri's Valet
- Douglas Seale as Count Arco – Colloredo's counselor
- Cassie Stuart as Gertrude Schlumberg (Director's Cut)
- John Strauss as Conductor
- Karl-Heinz Teuber as Wig Salesman
- Rita Zohar as Frau Schlumberg (Director's Cut)

== Production ==
Kenneth Branagh wrote in his autobiography Beginning that he was one of the early finalists for the role of Mozart, but was dropped from consideration when Forman decided to make the film with an American cast. Forman declined to have Tim Curry, who originated the role of Mozart on Broadway, reprise his role; however, he allowed Curry to screen-test for Salieri instead at Shaffer's suggestion. Mark Hamill, who replaced Curry as Mozart towards the end of the stage play's original Broadway run, was rejected by Forman because of his association with the character Luke Skywalker, believing audiences would not accept him as the composer.

Forman invited Hulce to a "get-acquainted session" in late 1982. However, Hulce was instructed not to study conducting, as the modern discipline is different than in Mozart's time, when conductors primarily kept time and often played along at the keyboard. Meg Tilly was cast as Mozart's wife Constanze, but she tore a ligament in her leg the day before shooting started. She was replaced by Elizabeth Berridge. Simon Callow, who played Mozart in the original London stage production of Amadeus, was cast as Emanuel Schikaneder, the librettist of The Magic Flute.

The film was shot on location in Prague for seven months, with primary filming ending in July 1983. and in Kroměříž at Kroměříž Castle. Forman was able to shoot scenes in the Estates Theatre in Prague, where Don Giovanni and La clemenza di Tito debuted two centuries before. Several other scenes were shot at the Barrandov Studios and Invalidovna building, a former hôtel des invalides, built in 1731–1737.

Forman collaborated with American choreographer Twyla Tharp for scenes that featured recreations of Mozart and Salieri operas.

The movie presented high realism by using candlelight inside the Estates Theater in Prague and filming full-length, authentic opera scenes.

Tom Hulce reportedly used John McEnroe's mood swings as a source of inspiration for his portrayal of Mozart's unpredictable genius. He claimed he did not find Mozart's signature laugh until he downed a bottle of whiskey.

== Reception ==
=== Critical reception ===
Amadeus holds a score of 90% on review aggregator Rotten Tomatoes based on 160 reviews, with an average rating of 9.1/10. The site's consensus states: "Amadeus' liberties with history may rankle some, but the creative marriage of Miloš Forman and Peter Shaffer yields a divinely diabolical myth of genius and mediocrity, buoyed by inspired casting and Mozart's rapturous music." Metacritic, which uses a weighted average, assigned the film a score of 87 out of 100, based on 28 critics, indicating "universal acclaim".

Giving the film four-out-of-four stars, Roger Ebert acknowledged that it was one of the "riskiest gambles a filmmaker has taken in a long time", but added that "there is nothing cheap or unworthy about the approach", and ultimately concluded that it was a "magnificent film, full and tender and funny and charming". Ebert later added the film to his Great Movies list. Peter Travers of People magazine said that "Hulce and Abraham share a dual triumph in a film that stands as a provocative and prodigious achievement." Stanley Kauffmann of The New Republic put it on his list of films worth seeing.

In one negative review, Todd McCarthy of Variety said that despite "great material and themes to work with, and such top talent involved," the "stature and power the work possessed onstage have been noticeably diminished" in the film adaptation. The film's many historical inaccuracies have attracted criticism from music historians.

=== Box office ===
The film grossed $52 million in the United States and Canada and by November 1985, while still in theatres overseas, had grossed over $90 million worldwide to date.

=== Accolades ===
The film was nominated for eleven Academy Awards and won eight, including Best Picture. At the end of the Oscar ceremony, Laurence Olivier came on stage to present the Oscar for Best Picture. As Olivier thanked the academy for inviting him, he was already opening the envelope. Instead of announcing the nominees, he simply read, "The winner for this is Amadeus." An AMPAS official quickly went onstage to confirm the winner and signaled that all was well before Olivier then presented the award to producer Saul Zaentz. Olivier (in his 78th year) had been ill for many years, and it was because of mild dementia that he forgot to read the nominees. Zaentz then thanked Olivier, saying it was an honor to receive the award from him, before mentioning the other nominees in his acceptance speech: The Killing Fields, A Passage to India, Places in the Heart and A Soldier's Story. Maurice Jarre won Best Original Music Score for his scoring of A Passage to India. In his acceptance speech for the award, Jarre remarked "I was lucky Mozart was not eligible this year". While accepting his first Oscar for Best Actor, F. Murray Abraham drew loud cheers when he said: "There is only one thing missing for me tonight—and that is to have Tom Hulce standing by my side."

The film is one of the few Best Picture winners never to enter the weekend box office top 5 after rankings began being recorded in 1982. (Note: Attributed to multiple references:) The film peaked at No. 6 during its 8th weekend in theaters. Saul Zaentz produced both Amadeus and The English Patient. In 2006, Writers Guild of America West ranked its screenplay 73rd in WGA's list of 101 Greatest Screenplays. In 2016, the Directors Guild of America included the film in its list of The 80 Best-Directed Films since the Guild’s founding in 1936.

Award	Category	Nominee(s)	Result	Ref.
Academy Awards	Best Picture	Saul Zaentz	Won	
Academy Awards	Best Director	Miloš Forman	Won	
Academy Awards	Best Actor	F. Murray Abraham	Won	
Academy Awards	Best Actor	Tom Hulce	Nominated	
Academy Awards	Best Screenplay – Based on Material from Another Medium	Peter Shaffer	Won	
Academy Awards	Best Art Direction	Art Direction: Patrizia von Brandenstein; Set Decoration: Karel Černý	Won	
Academy Awards	Best Cinematography	Miroslav Ondříček	Nominated	
Academy Awards	Best Costume Design	Theodor Pištěk	Won	
Academy Awards	Best Film Editing	Nena Danevic and Michael Chandler	Nominated	
Academy Awards	Best Makeup	Dick Smith and Paul LeBlanc	Won	
Academy Awards	Best Sound	Mark Berger, Tom Scott, Todd Boekelheide, and Christopher Newman	Won	
Amanda Awards	Best Foreign Feature Film	Miloš Forman	Won	
American Cinema Editors Awards	Best Edited Feature Film	Nena Danevic and Michael Chandley	Won	
American Film Institute	AFI's 100 Years...100 Movies		53rd Place	
Artios Awards	Outstanding Achievement in Feature Film Casting	Mary Goldberg	Won	
British Academy Film Awards	Best Film	Saul Zaentz and Miloš Forman	Nominated	
British Academy Film Awards	Best Actor in a Leading Role	F Murray Abraham	Nominated	
British Academy Film Awards	Best Adapted Screenplay	Peter Shaffer	Nominated	
British Academy Film Awards	Best Cinematography	Miroslav Ondříček	Won	
British Academy Film Awards	Best Costume Design	Theodor Pištěk	Nominated	
British Academy Film Awards	Best Editing	Nena Danevic and Michael Chandler	Won	
British Academy Film Awards	Best Make-Up Artist	Paul LeBlanc and Dick Smith	Won	
British Academy Film Awards	Best Production Design	Patrizia von Brandstein	Nominated	
British Academy Film Awards	Best Sound	John Nutt, Christopher Newman, and Mark Berger	Won	
British Society of Cinematographers Awards	Best Cinematography in a Theatrical Feature Film	Miroslav Ondrícek	Nominated	
César Awards	Best Foreign Film		Won	
David di Donatello Awards	Best Foreign Film	Miloš Forman	Won	
David di Donatello Awards	Best Foreign Director	Miloš Forman	Won	
David di Donatello Awards	Best Foreign Actor	Tom Hulce	Won	
Directors Guild of America Awards	Outstanding Directorial Achievement in Motion Pictures	Miloš Forman	Won	
DVD Exclusive Awards	Original Retrospective Documentary, Library Release	Paul Hemstreet, Bill Jersey, and Charles Kiselyak	Nominated	
DVD Exclusive Awards	Best Audio Commentary, Library Release	Miloš Forman and Peter Shaffer	Nominated	
Golden Globe Awards	Best Motion Picture – Drama		Won	
Golden Globe Awards	Best Actor in a Motion Picture – Drama	F. Murray Abraham	Won	
Golden Globe Awards	Best Actor in a Motion Picture – Drama	Tom Hulce	Nominated	
Golden Globe Awards	Best Supporting Actor – Motion Picture	Jeffrey Jones	Nominated	
Golden Globe Awards	Best Director – Motion Picture	Miloš Forman	Won	
Golden Globe Awards	Best Screenplay – Motion Picture	Peter Shaffer	Won	
Golden Screen Awards			Won	
Japan Academy Film Prize	Best Foreign Language Film		Won	
Joseph Plateau Awards	Best Film		Won	
Joseph Plateau Awards	Best Director	Miloš Forman	Won	
Joseph Plateau Awards	Best Artistic Contribution		Won	
Jussi Awards	Best Foreign Filmmaker	Miloš Forman	Won	
Kansas City Film Critics Circle Awards	Best Actor	F. Murray Abraham	Won	
Kinema Junpo Awards	Best Foreign Language Film	Miloš Forman	Won	
Los Angeles Film Critics Association Awards	Best Picture		Won	
Los Angeles Film Critics Association Awards	Best Director	Miloš Forman	Won	
Los Angeles Film Critics Association Awards	Best Actor	F. Murray Abraham	Won (Note: Tied with Albert Finney for Under the Volcano.)	
Los Angeles Film Critics Association Awards	Best Screenplay	Peter Shaffer	Won	
Los Angeles Film Critics Association Awards	Best Music Score	Wolfgang Amadeus Mozart (Note: Posthumous nomination.)	Runner-up	
Nastro d'Argento	Best Foreign Director	Miloš Forman	Won	
Nastro d'Argento	Best Foreign Actor	Tom Hulce	Won	
National Film Preservation Board	National Film Registry		Inducted	
Online Film & Television Association Awards	Film Hall of Fame: Productions		Won	
Robert Awards	Best Foreign Film	Miloš Forman	Won	
Turkish Film Critics Association Awards	Best Foreign Film		Won	

== Historicity ==
From the beginning, writer Peter Shaffer and director Miloš Forman both were open about their desire to create entertaining drama only loosely based on reality. Forman admitted that neither the play nor the film was ever "intended to be a documentary", calling the film a "fantasia on the theme of Mozart and Salieri". The idea of animosity between Mozart and Salieri was popularized by Alexander Pushkin in his 1830 play Mozart and Salieri, where Salieri murders Mozart on stage. The play was made into the 1897 opera Mozart and Salieri by Nikolai Rimsky-Korsakov, which in turn had its first screen adaptation by silent-film director Victor Tourjansky in 1914.

In real life, Salieri and Mozart "were in constant contact" during their years in the Vienna music scene and may even have been friends, although they were also professional rivals. The claim that Salieri killed Mozart has been generally debunked; in 1981, Harold C. Schonberg wrote that "medical men who have studied the reports of Mozart's final illness [were] almost unanimous in saying that Mozart died of kidney failure." In 1785, Mozart and Salieri co-wrote the cantata Per la ricuperata salute di Ofelia, which was rediscovered many years after the film's release; Mozart scholar Ulrich Leisinger admitted that the piece was "not great". Salieri "frequently conducted Mozart's work" and gave Mozart's son music lessons after Mozart's death. In addition, Alex Ross wrote that Mozart and Salieri's relationship improved after the death of Emperor Joseph II, a supporter of Salieri. Schonberg said that "we will never know ... the exact nature of the relationship between the two men."

However, the film's narrative was indirectly inspired by real-life rumors about Salieri killing Mozart. These rumors were prevalent enough that Rossini joked about them to Salieri's face when meeting the man in 1822. It was said that Salieri confessed to the murder in 1823, shortly before his death and the same year he attempted suicide, although the claim is generally dismissed as either pure rumor or "the ramblings of a man suffering from dementia", and Ignaz Moscheles wrote that Salieri personally denied the rumor to him on his hospital deathbed. In 1824, an anonymous detractor passed out leaflets at a Beethoven performance repeating this claim.

The claim that Salieri saw Mozart as a competitor has more historical support. In a biography published shortly after Salieri's death, which was purportedly based on Salieri's now-lost draft autobiography, Ignaz von Mosel wrote that Salieri respected Mozart, but was jealous of him. Salieri also did, in fact, criticize Mozart's dissipated lifestyle. Harold Schonberg noted that although Salieri had a reputation for being generous to composers who were down on their luck, he never helped Mozart.

Several members of the Mozart family thought that Salieri used his political clout to minimize his professional rival, including Leopold Mozart (who wrote that "Salieri and all his supporters" would "move heaven and earth to ruin [The Marriage of Figaro]"), Constanze Mozart (who claimed that her husband sometimes doubted Salieri's intentions towards him), and possibly even Mozart himself (he privately complained to his father about the Italians' excessive influence on the Austrian music industry). Constanze also boasted that Salieri rejected da Ponte's libretto for Così fan tutte, only for Mozart to turn it into a well-regarded opera. Moscheles agreed that his friend Salieri's "intrigues" had hampered Mozart's career. However, Alex Ross cautioned that "evidence for Salieri's supposed machinations against Mozart is scant" and that Mozart had a "tendency to see plots arrayed against him".

Another significant departure in the film is the portrayal of Salieri as a pious loner trapped in a vow of chastity, when in reality he was a married family man with eight children and at least one mistress.

Mozart was indeed commissioned to compose a Requiem Mass by an anonymous benefactor. In reality, the patron turned out to be Count Franz von Walsegg, who was grieving after the death of his wife.

== Director's cut ==
Amadeus premiered in 1984 with an MPAA rating of PG and a running time of 161 minutes. In 2002, director Miloš Forman assembled an R-rated version (marketed as the "Director's Cut") with nearly 20 minutes of restored footage. From 2002 to 2025, this was the only widely available release. A restoration of the version released in theaters (marketed as the "Theatrical Cut") was released in 2025.

It is not clear whether Forman's Director's Cut represents his actual artistic vision. Forman defended the 20 minutes of cuts in his 1993 autobiography Turnaround, and repeated his defense in the 1995 supplemental material for Pioneer's deluxe LaserDisc. The Director's Cut has come under severe criticism, in part because it displaced the original theatrical edition, instead of complementing it. Rian Johnson argued that the Director's Cut "is bizarrely a sort of inverse master class in editing: It shows exactly why the cuts were made in the first place & how they made the film work." Roger Ebert noted that the cut was part of a broader wave of directors' cuts on home video, which he characterized as a "mixed blessing". The A.V. Club's Tasha Robinson noted that most of the additional sequences were either redundant or unnecessary, and broke up the "lively flow between scenes" that marked the theatrical edition's superb editing.

On the other hand, critics have recognized the merits of some of the additional scenes. Ebert and Robinson agreed that the added scenes better explained Constanze's hatred for Salieri, although Robinson questioned whether that subplot actually required a scene with the character topless. Jordan Hoffmann (Foreign Policy) added that the subplot featuring Christine Ebersole as a Salieri-obsessed singer who has sex with Mozart, was "splendid."

More broadly, while promoting the Director's Cut, Forman argued that the unlimited running time of home video provided a better environment for the deleted scenes:

When you finish a film, before the first paying audience sees it, you don't have any idea. You don't know if you made a success or a flop when it comes to the box office. And in the '80s, with MTV on the scene, we are having a three-hour film about classical music, with long names and wigs and costumes. Don't forget that no major studio wanted to finance the film, for these reasons. So we said, "Well, we don't want to be pushing the audience's patience too far". Whatever was not directly connected to the plot, I just cut it out. But it was a mutual decision [to limit the running time]. I wanted the best life for the film myself... Well, once we are re-releasing it on DVD, it doesn't matter if it is two hours and 40 minutes long, or three hours long. So why don't we do the version as it was written in the script?

In 2024, Saul Zaentz Co. announced that in conjunction with the Academy Film Archive and Teatro Della Pace Film, it had completed a 4K restoration of the theatrical version of Amadeus, to celebrate the film's 40th anniversary. Restorers noted that Paul Zaentz, Saul's nephew and successor, personally preferred the Theatrical Cut to the Director's Cut. The distributors issued an Ultra-HD Blu-ray of the restored Theatrical Cut on February 25, 2025.

== Music ==
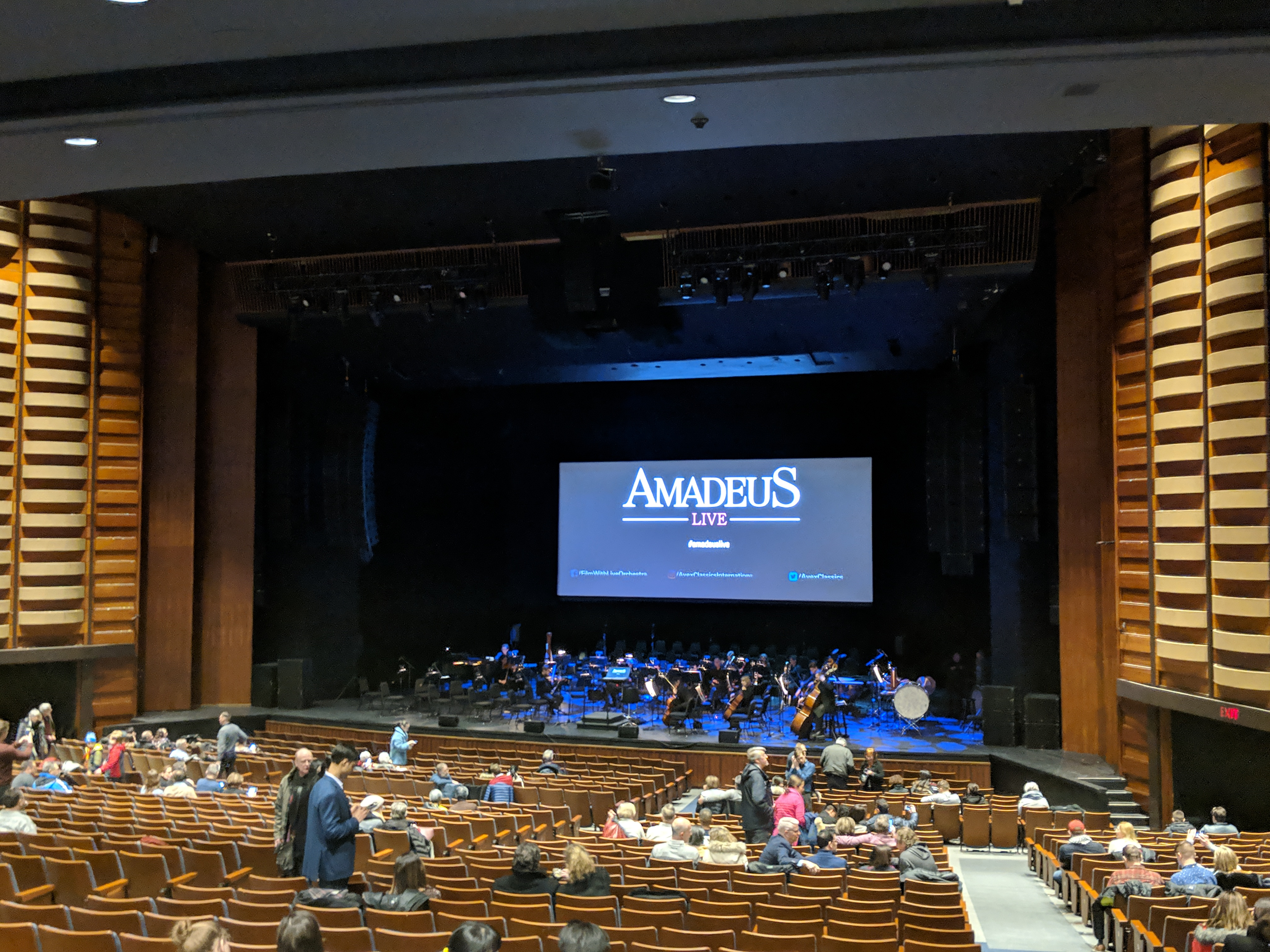
Amadeus music performed live in-sync with the movie by an orchestra and choir at Meridian Hall in Toronto

=== Film credits ===
- Music conducted and supervised by Neville Marriner
- Music coordinator: John Strauss
- Orchestra: Academy of St Martin in the Fields, conducted by Neville Marriner
- Choruses
  - Academy Chorus of St Martin in the Fields, conducted by László Heltay
  - Ambrosian Opera Chorus, conducted by John McCarthy
  - The Choristers of Westminster Abbey, conducted by Simon Preston
- Instrumental soloists
  - Piano Concerto No. 22 in E♭ major, K. 482: Ivan Moravec
  - Piano Concerto No. 20 in D minor, K. 466: Imogen Cooper
  - Adagio in C minor for Glass Harmonica, K. 617: Thomas Bloch with The Brussels Virtuosi, conducted by Marc Grauwels
- Parody backgrounds: San Francisco Symphony Chorus
- "Caro mio ben" by Giuseppe Giordani: Michele Esposito, soprano

=== Original soundtrack recording ===
The soundtrack album reached No. 1 in the Billboard Classical Albums Chart, No. 56 in the Billboard Popular Albums Chart, has sold over 6.5 million copies and received thirteen gold discs, making it one of the most popular classical music recordings of all time. It won the Grammy Award for Best Classical Album in 1984.

- Disc 1
1. Mozart: Symphony No. 25 in G minor, K. 183, 1st movement
2. Giovanni Battista Pergolesi: Stabat Mater: "Quando corpus morietur" and "Amen"
3. Early 18th Century Gypsy Music: Bubak and Hungaricus
4. Mozart: Serenade for Winds in B♭ major, K. 361, 3rd movement
5. Mozart: The Abduction from the Seraglio, K. 384, Turkish Finale
6. Mozart: Symphony No. 29 in A major, K. 201, 1st movement
7. Mozart: Concerto for Two Pianos in E♭ major, K. 365, 3rd movement
8. Mozart: Great Mass in C minor, K. 427, Kyrie
9. Mozart: Sinfonia Concertante in E♭ major, K. 364, 1st movement
- Disc 2
1. Mozart: Piano Concerto No. 22 in E♭ major, K. 482, 3rd movement
2. Mozart: The Marriage of Figaro, K. 492, Act III, "Ecco la Marcia"
3. Mozart: The Marriage of Figaro, K. 492, Act IV, "Ah, tutti contenti"
4. Mozart: Don Giovanni, K. 527, Act II, Commendatore scene
5. Mozart: Zaide, K. 344, Aria, "Ruhe sanft"
6. Mozart: Requiem, K. 626, Introitus (orchestral introduction)
7. Mozart: Requiem, K. 626, Dies irae
8. Mozart: Requiem, K. 626, Rex tremendae majestatis
9. Mozart: Requiem, K. 626, Confutatis
10. Mozart: Requiem, K. 626, Lacrimosa
11. Mozart: Piano Concerto No. 20 in D minor, K. 466, 2nd movement

All tracks on the album were performed specifically for the film. According to the film commentary by Forman and Shaffer, Marriner agreed to score the film if Mozart's music was completely unchanged from the original scores. However, this was not strictly observed – the Adagio of the Serenade for Winds in B♭ major, K. 361, featured in Salieri's famous monologue extolling the divine beauty of Mozart's music, is truncated abruptly in the film performance. In addition, Marriner added some notes to Salieri's music that are noticeable at the beginning of the film, as Salieri begins his confession.

The aria "Ruhe sanft" from the opera Zaide does not appear in the film.

=== Charts ===
==== Weekly charts ====
Chart (1985–2006)	Peak position
Australian Albums (Kent Music Report)	10
Belgian Albums (Ultratop Flanders)	97
Canada Top Albums/CDs (RPM)	36
Dutch Albums (Album Top 100)	10
European Albums (Eurotipsheet)	21
Finnish Albums (Suomen virallinen lista)	30
French Albums (SNEP)	42
New Zealand Albums (RMNZ)	9
Swedish Albums (Sverigetopplistan)	10
Swiss Albums (Schweizer Hitparade)	7
UK Albums (Official Charts)	64
US Billboard 200	56

==== Year-end charts ====
Chart (1985)	Position
New Zealand Albums (RMNZ)	39

=== More Music from the Original Soundtrack ===
In 1985, an additional album with the title More Music from the Original Soundtrack of the Film Amadeus was issued containing further selections of music that were not included in the original soundtrack release.

1. Mozart: The Magic Flute, K. 620, Overture
2. Mozart: The Magic Flute, K. 620, act 2, Queen of the Night aria
3. Mozart: Masonic Funeral Music, K. 477
4. Mozart: Piano Concerto No. 20 in D minor, K. 466, 1st movement
5. Antonio Salieri: Axur, re d'Ormus, Finale
6. Mozart: Eine kleine Nachtmusik (Serenade No. 13 for Strings in G major), K. 525, 1st movement, arranged for woodwind octet by Graham Sheen
7. Mozart: Concerto for Flute and Harp in C major, K. 299, 2nd movement
8. Mozart: Six German Dances (Nos. 1–3), K. 509
9. Giuseppe Giordani: "Caro mio ben"
10. Mozart: The Abduction from the Seraglio, K. 384, Chorus of the Janissaries (arr.) and "Ich möchte wohl der Kaiser sein" ("Ein deutsches Kriegslied"), K. 539 (arr.)

The Masonic Funeral Music was originally intended to play over the closing credits, but was replaced in the film by the second movement of the Piano Concerto No. 20 in D minor (included on the Original Soundtrack Recording).

=== Director's Cut soundtrack ===
In 2002, to coincide with the release of the Director's Cut of the film, the soundtrack was remastered with 24-bit encoding and reissued with the title Special Edition: The Director's Cut – Newly Remastered Original Soundtrack Recording on two 24-karat gold CDs. It contains most of the music from the previous two releases, but with the following differences.

The following pieces were added for this release:

- Salieri's March of Welcome turned into "Non più andrai" from The Marriage of Figaro (includes dialogue from the film)
- Adagio in C minor for Glass Harmonica, K. 617 (from a new 2001 recording)

The following pieces, previously released on More Music from the Original Soundtrack of the Film Amadeus, were not included:

- Masonic Funeral Music, K. 477
- Six German Dances (Nos. 1–3), K. 509

== Legacy ==
A TV series adaptation of the original Shaffer play, called Amadeus, starring Will Sharpe and Paul Bettany was filmed in 2024 and was aired on Sky TV in December of 2025.

The pink wig worn by Mozart is in the permanent exhibition of the Acadian Museum at the University of Moncton. The wig was created by Paul LeBlanc, who won an Oscar for Best Makeup and Hairstyling for this movie in 1985.

The theatre release poster for the movie inspired the cover art of the Swedish band's Ghost 2013 album Infestissumam.
