= Freedom on My Mind =

1994 documentary film by Connie Field and Marilyn Mulford

- Directed by: Connie Field; Marilyn Mulford
- Written by: Michael Chandler
- Produced by: Connie Field; Marilyn Mulford
- Starring: Ronnie Washington; Steve Most; Victoria Gray
- Cinematography: Michael Chinn; Steve Devita; Vicente Franco
- Edited by: Michael A. Chandler
- Music by: Mary Watkins
- Distributed by: Tara Releasing
- Release dates: January 1994 (Sundance); June 22, 1994 (U.S.)
- Running time: 105 minutes
- Country: United States
- Language: English

Freedom on My Mind is a 1994 feature documentary film that tells the story of the Mississippi voter registration movement of 1961 to 1964, which was characterized by violence against the people involved, including multiple instances of murder.

The film was produced and directed by Connie Field and Marilyn Mulford. Participants interviewed include Bob Moses, Victoria Gray Adams, Endesha Ida Mae Holland, and Freedom Summer volunteers Marshall Ganz, Heather Booth, and Pam Allen.

Freedom on My Mind premiered at the Sundance Film Festival, won that year's Grand Jury Prize for Best Documentary, and was nominated for an Academy Award for Best Documentary Feature.

== Synopsis ==
In 1961, Mississippi was rigidly segregated. There were virtually no black voters even though African-Americans comprised a large percentage of the population, the majority in some localities. Bob Moses entered the state and the Mississippi Voter Registration Project began. The first black farmer who attempted to register was fatally shot by a Mississippi State Representative, E.H. Hurst. Due to intimidation of witnesses, one of whom, Louis Allen, was slain, Hurst was never prosecuted.

Among the events depicted in the film is the Freedom Summer of 1964, in which three civil rights workers were slain.

Freedom on My Mind combines personal interviews, rare archival film and television footage, authentic Mississippi Delta blues, and Movement gospel songs. It emphasizes the strategic brilliance of Mississippi's young, black organizers. Barred from political participation, they created their own integrated party the Mississippi Freedom Democratic Party. They recruited a thousand mostly white students from around the country to come to Mississippi, bringing the eyes and conscience of the nation with them. The students and the Mississippi Freedom Democratic Party organizers put together a delegation of sharecroppers, maids, and day-laborers that challenged the all-white delegates in the 1964 Democratic National Convention. The film describes how their effort to replace the state's delegation was not accepted by the Democratic Party leadership, embittering the activists.

Ultimately their efforts succeeded. In 1965 Congress passed the Voting Rights Act, and by 1990, Mississippi had more elected black officials than any other state in the country.

== Cast ==
- Victoria Gray Adams as Self
- Chude Pamela Allen as Self
- Heather Booth as Self
- L.C. Dorsey as Self
- Len Edwards as Self
- Marshall Ganz as Self
- Malva and Red Heffner as Selves
- Endesha Ida Mae Holland as Self
- Bob Moses as Self
- Curtis Muhammad as Self (credited as Curtis Hayes)
- Cleveland Sellers as Self (credited as Cleve Sellars)

== Reception ==
Variety called it "a landmark documentary that chronicles the most tumultuous and significant years in the history of the civil rights movement. A must see." It was broadcast on PBS's American Experience and internationally, and has been used educationally in colleges and universities around the world.

The Washington Post said that the film "conveys the human dimensions of the fight with such a powerful combination of sensitivity and intelligence and pure emotional insight that it seems as if the facts were being set down for the very first time. As political history this is superlative stuff."

Critic John Petrakis of The Chicago Tribune called the film "superbly produced and "must-viewing for anyone with an interest in the civil rights movement or American history."

On review aggregator website Rotten Tomatoes, the film holds an approval rating of 100% based on 5 reviews, with an average rating of 8.0/10.

== Honors ==
- Sundance Film Festival: Grand Jury Prize for Best Documentary (1994)
- Academy Awards: Nominated as Best Feature Documentary (1994)
- winner, Erik Barnouw Award, Organization of American Historians (1995)
- winner, John O'Connor Award, American Historical Association
- winner, Distinguished Documentary Award, International Documentary Association (1994)
- winner, CINE Golden Eagle (1996)

== See also ==
- Civil rights movement in popular culture
- Louis Allen
- Voting Rights Act of 1965

Awards
Preceded by Children of Fate	Sundance Grand Jury Prize: Documentary; 1994	Succeeded by Crumb
