= Have You Heard from Johannesburg =

- Directed by: Connie Field
- Produced by: Connie Field
- Cinematography: Tom Hurwitz (principal cinematography)
- Edited by: Gregory Scharpen (series editor)
- Production company: Clarity Films
- Release date: 2010
- Running time: 8 hours and 30 minutes, in 7 episodes
- Country: United States
- Language: English

Have You Heard from Johannesburg is a 2010 series of seven documentary films, covering the 45-year struggle of the global anti-apartheid movement against South Africa's apartheid system and its international supporters who considered them an ally in the Cold War.

The combined films have an epic scope, spanning most of the globe over half a century. Beginning with the very first session of the United Nations, and ending in 1990, when, after 27 years in prison, Nelson Mandela, the best known leader of the African National Congress toured the world as a free man. Produced and directed by Connie Field, it includes other events such as the Sharpeville massacre, the Soweto uprising and the murder of Steve Biko.

The series' title is derived from the lyrics of the Gil Scott-Heron song "Johannesburg".

With a combined running time of 8 hours and 30 minutes, Have You Heard from Johannesburg premiered at Film Forum in Manhattan, New York City, on 14 April 2010. Film Forum screened the films in three separate programs, with each program running up to 3 hours in length.

== Synopsis ==
In the 1950s many black South Africans realized that the struggle against apartheid had to be built in four arenas of action: mass action, underground organization, armed struggle, and international mobilization. Have You Heard From Johannesburg takes viewers inside that last arena, the movement to mobilise worldwide citizen action to isolate the apartheid regime. Inspired by the courage and suffering of South Africa's people as they fought back against the violence and oppression of racism, foreign solidarity groups, in cooperation with exiled South Africans, took up the anti-apartheid cause. Working against heavy odds, in a climate of apathy or even support for the governments of Hendrik Verwoerd, John Vorster and P.W. Botha, campaigners challenged their governments and powerful corporations in the West to face up to the immorality of their collaboration with apartheid.

This was not just a political battle; it was economic, cultural, moral, and spiritual. The struggle came to many surprising venues: it was waged in sports arenas and cathedrals, in embassies and corporate boardrooms, at fruit stands and beaches, at rock concerts and gas stations. Thousands died, but in the end, nonviolent pressures played a major part in the collapse of apartheid and thus in the stunning victory of democracy in South Africa.

== Episodes ==
1. Have You Heard from Johannesburg: Road to Resistance

The first film begins in 1948 when the United Nations adopted the Universal Declaration of Human Rights. That same year South Africa implemented a system of laws called apartheid to racially segregate its people in every aspect of life. The black majority in South Africa, led by the African National Congress, mounted the Defiance Campaign, attracting the attention of activists in places like England, Sweden, and the United States - and sowed the seeds of an international anti-apartheid movement. The world reacted with horror when peaceful protesters were shot in the South African township of Sharpeville and the entire African National Congress leadership was forced underground or imprisoned. Nelson Mandela is jailed for life and the movement in South Africa is effectively shut down as hundreds escape into exile.

2. Have You Heard from Johannesburg: Hell of a Job

The second film begins when African National Congress Deputy President Oliver Tambo escaped from South Africa into exile and embarked on what became a 30-year journey to engage the world in the struggle to bring democracy to South Africa. With resistance inside South Africa effectively crushed by the apartheid regime, the fate of the liberation struggle was in Tambo's hands. He first found allies in the newly independent countries of Africa, and with their collective strength behind him, he approached the United Nations for support, insisting that the apartheid government could be forced to the negotiating table if the Security Council would sanction and isolate the regime. But the Western powers refused to act, forcing Tambo to search for new support. He successfully petitioned the Soviet Union for help in building a guerrilla army, a decision that landed Tambo and the African National Congress in the vice of the Cold War and haunted his global efforts for years to come.

But two individuals helped to open crucial doors in the West: Olof Palme, Prime Minister of Sweden, and Archbishop Trevor Huddleston, whose early support inspired Oliver Tambo to seek out strategic partnerships with faith leaders worldwide. At the beginning of the 1970s, Tambo and the ANC had gained financing from Sweden and support from the World Council of Churches, whose members in congregations around the world joined the fight against apartheid. With these new allies on his side, Tambo had the beginnings of a worldwide movement.

3. Have You Heard from Johannesburg: The New Generation

In the third film it is youth, both inside and outside South Africa, who next joined the growing movement against apartheid. Buoyed by new support in Western countries, Tambo returned to the United Nations to try to convince the world body to sanction South Africa. His efforts gained new public support as the brutal suppression of a youth uprising in the South African township of Soweto and the controversial death of Steve Biko turned South Africa from a country into a cause, a worldwide emblem of injustice. In 1977 a significant victory was won when the United Nations issued a mandatory arms embargo: the first in history. But South Africa's strongest trading partners in the West still would not sanction it economically, and as Tambo headed to Zambia to minister to the African National Congress' growing guerrilla army, a bloodbath seemed inevitable. But even as the most powerful western governments refused to heed Tambo's calls for cultural and economic boycotts, the citizens of those western nations would help turn the tide.

4. Have You Heard from Johannesburg: Fair Play

In the fourth film athletes and activists around the world, faced with governments reluctant to take meaningful action against the apartheid regime, hit white South Africa where it hurts: on the playing field. International boycotts against apartheid sports teams help bring the human rights crisis in South Africa to the forefront of global attention and sever white South Africans' cultural ties to the West. Knowing that fellow blacks in South Africa were denied even the most basic human rights - let alone the right to participate in international sports competitions - African nations refused to compete with all-white South African teams, boycotted the Olympics and created a worldwide media spectacle that forced the International Olympic Committee to ban apartheid teams from future games. The Africa-led coalition led the fight to exclude South Africa from soccer, boxing, track, cycling, judo, fencing, gymnastics, volleyball and numerous other competitions, and barred South African teams from nearly all sports events by the 1970s. Only South Africa's world champion rugby team remained, and citizens in key western countries where rugby is played took to the fields to close the last door on apartheid sports. The sports campaign became the anti-apartheid movement's first victory and succeeded in culturally isolating the white minority in an arena of passionate importance.

5. Have You Heard from Johannesburg: From Selma to Soweto

The fifth film focuses on one of South Africa's most important and powerful allies, the United States. It became a key battleground in the anti-apartheid movement as African-Americans led the charge to change the government's policy toward the apartheid regime. A grassroots movement to get colleges, city councils, and states to divest their holdings in companies doing business in South Africa spread across the entire nation pressuring the U.S. Congress to finally sanction South Africa. This stunning victory is won against the formidable opposition of President Ronald Reagan. African-Americans significantly altered U.S. foreign policy for the first time in history. European sanctions followed, and with them, the political isolation of the apartheid regime.

6. Have You Heard from Johannesburg: The Bottom Line

The six film is the story of the first-ever international grassroots campaign to successfully use economic pressure to help bring down a government. Recognizing the apartheid regime's dependence on its financial connections to the West, citizens all over the world, from employees of Polaroid to a General Motors director, from student account-holders in Barclays Bank to consumers who boycott Shell gas, all refused to let business with South Africa go on as usual. Boycotts and divestment campaigns brought the anti-apartheid movement into the lives and communities of people around the world, helping everyday people understand and challenge Western economic support for apartheid. Faced with attacks at home and growing chaos in South Africa, international companies pulled out in a mass exodus, causing a financial crisis in South Africa and making it clear that the days of the apartheid regime were numbered.

7. Have You Heard from Johannesburg: Free at Last

The seventh, and final, film dives into the heart of the conflict, South Africans tell the story of the most important effort in the anti-apartheid campaign of the 80's: the alliance that brought together anti-apartheid forces in South Africa as never before. A mass movement gained unprecedented momentum when three generations of resistance fighters band together as the United Democratic Front. Faced with growing international isolation, the apartheid government tried to win allies and convince the world of the merit of its piecemeal reforms even as it struggled to suppress open revolt, at times using savage secret tactics. The United Democratic Front protests climaxed in a new Defiance Campaign, and internationally, Nelson Mandela became a household name as the campaign to free him ignited a worldwide crusade. Caught between an unstoppable internal mass movement and ongoing international pressure, the apartheid regime was finally forced to the negotiating table and at last lifts the decades-long bans on the African National Congress. After twenty-seven years in prison, Nelson Mandela was released, sparking a global celebration as he toured the world to thank all. After 30 years in exile, Oliver Tambo was finally able to return to South Africa. But the struggle had taken a heavy toll on him and he would die one year before his comrade, Nelson Mandela, is elected the first black president of a democratic South Africa.

== Broadcast ==
The seven films were shortened to five episodes for television and shown on Independent Lens on PBS in 2012.

== Reception ==
Keith Uhlich of Time Out New York named Have You Heard from Johannesburg the tenth-best film of 2010, calling it a "sprawling, multifaceted portrait."

On review aggregator website Rotten Tomatoes, the film holds an approval rating of 100% based on 8 reviews, with an average rating of 8.9/10.

== Awards ==
The series won a Primetime Emmy Award for Exceptional Merit in Documentary Filmmaking in 2012, for its broadcast on PBS.

== Home media ==
Have You Heard from Johannesburg was released on a seven-disc DVD set in 2011 by Clarity Films, with each film on a separate disc. Each disc contains extra material.
