= Michael A. Chandler =

American film editor, screenwriter and film director

- Born: United States
- Occupations: producer/director, writer, film editor

Michael Chandler is an American producer, director, writer and editor of feature and documentary films. He produced and directed, with Sheila Canavan, the feature documentary Compared to What? The Improbable Journey of Barney Frank, a Showtime Networks Broadcast Premier and official selection of the Tribeca Film Festival; the PBS Independent Lens feature documentary Knee Deep which one reviewer called, “one of the year's best 'believe it or not' documentaries, a rural Rashomon and a compelling cinematic experience;” and produced & directed Forgotten Fires, a PBS documentary which investigated the burning by Ku Klux Klansmen of Black churches. Bill Moyers said about it: "If we wanted a real dialog about race in America, we'd start with this film." Chandler also produced & directed investigative documentaries for the PBS series Frontline, including Blackout, a collaboration with The New York Times, The Future of War, and Secrets of the SAT.

He was nominated for an Academy Award for Best Film Editing for the film Amadeus. He also won the BAFTA Award for Best Editing for the same film, which he shared with Nena Danevic. He is a two-time winner of the American Cinema Editors (ACE) Eddie Award, for Best Edited Feature for Amadeus and for Best Edited Documentary for the ABC production Can’t It Be Anyone Else?

He was film editor on Mishima: A Life in Four Chapters, Never Cry Wolf and Empire Records. He was writer and editor of Freedom on My Mind (Academy Award Nomination, Sundance Grand Jury Prize), co-writer and consulting editor on The Most Dangerous Man in America: Daniel Ellsberg and the Pentagon Papers (Academy Award Nomination), editor of Waldo Salt: A Screenwriter's Journey (Academy Award Nomination) and Squires of San Quentin (Academy Award Nomination), and co-writer and editor of Yosemite: The Fate of Heaven (Emmy Award). As writer and editor of the ABC television special Can't It Be Anyone Else? he was awarded the Christopher Award, presented for works that "affirm the highest values of the human spirit."

Chandler is a member of the Academy of Motion Picture Arts and Sciences, the American Cinema Editors, and the Writer's Guild.
