= L.C. Dorsey =

- Born: Lula Dorsey; December 17, 1938; Tribbett, Mississippi
- Died: August 21, 2013 (aged 74); Jackson, Mississippi
- Education: Howard University
- Known for: Civil rights activism and prison reform advocacy

L.C. Dorsey (also known as Dr. Lula C. Dorsey; December 17, 1938 – August 21, 2013) was a civil rights activist and prison reform advocate. She is known for her social justice advocacy work centered in Mississippi, specifically her efforts to address racial inequality.

== Early life and education ==
L.C. Dorsey was born on December 17, 1938, and grew up in Tribbett, Mississippi, in Sunflower and Washington Counties. She received her elementary education in plantation schools in those counties. She later attended Drew Colored School. However, Dorsey’s education was interrupted when she dropped out during 11th grade to care for her six children.

Dorsey’s early life was influenced by her mother, who read her stories from the Chicago Defender, which piqued her interest in social justice and activism. At a young age, Dorsey began exploring this interest, beginning by studying the Southern Christian Leadership Conference’s techniques for organizing volunteers. As a result, she was exposed to information that allowed her to mobilize people for civil rights advocacy.

In 1968, Dorsey graduated from Tufts University with a GED from its STAR (Systematic Training and Redevelopment) Program. In 1973, Dorsey graduated from Stony Brook University in New York with a degree in social work. Dorsey later went on to receive a Certificate in Health Management from Johns Hopkins University. She also received her doctorate from Howard University in Washington, D.C., as a Doctor of Philosophy in social work.

== Career ==
Dorsey began her professional career in 1964 when she became a community specialist for Head Start, a program that focused on health initiatives and prisoner rights for communities of color. Two years later, in 1966, Dorsey began working with Operation Help, a program that sought jobs and resources for disadvantaged populations. This role connected her with Fannie Lau Hamer, who inspired Dorsey to involve herself with the Mississippi Freedom Democratic Party. Consequently, Dorsey began organizing boycotts and demonstrations for the civil rights movement.

From 1974 to 1983, Dorsey expanded her activism to incorporate prison reform, and she began doing so by serving as associate director of the Southern Coalition on Jails and Prison. There she advocated for humane treatment for incarcerated individuals. During this time, Dorsey wrote articles on prison reform for the Jackson Advocate, and in 1983, she self-published Cold Steel, a 36-page book describing life in Mississippi’s Parchman Prison. Dorsey’s advocacy for prison reform resulted in her being appointed to Jimmy Carter’s National Council for Economic Opportunity from 1978 to 1979. In 1984, Dorsey continued her work with prison reform by partaking in public forums like "Not In Our Names: Uniting Against the Death Penalty", which was sponsored by the D.C. Coalition Against the Death Penalty. From 1988 to 1995, Dorsey worked at the Delta Health Center in Mound Bayou as the executive director, focusing her work on community activism. Dorsey died on Wednesday, August 21, 2013 at the age of 74 in her home in Jackson, Mississippi.

== Awards and recognition ==
L.C. Dorsey’s dedication to social justice and civil rights has earned her recognition during and after her lifetime. Her work is honored by the Jackson-based Dr. Mary S. Nelums Foundation with the annual Dr. L. C. Dorsey Social Activist Award, which celebrates individuals who demonstrate exemplary commitment to activism. She was also honored by The Women's Fund of Mississippi for her work in gender equality on October 24, 2013. Additionally, Dorsey received the MSW of the Year Award through Rosemont Human Services for her community advocacy in May 2024. She was inducted into her alma mater’s HU Social Work Hall of Fame for recognition of her many achievements in social work and justice reform. After Dorsey's death, the Mississippi Civil Rights Museum honored her legacy by including her contributions to the civil rights movement in exhibitions.
