= Susana Silvestre =

Argentine writer

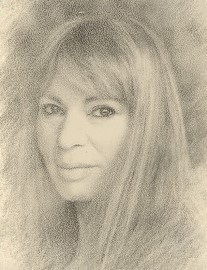
Susana Silvestre

Susana Sivestre (11 November 1950, Buenos Aires - March 2, 2008) was an Argentine writer. She wrote the stories "El Espectáculo del mundo" (“The show of the world”- 1983), which was awarded the Roberto Arlt Prize by the Municipality of Comodoro Rivadavia (province of Chubut) in 1982.

== Works ==
Her book “Los humos de Clitemnestra” (The fumes of Clytemnestra) was awarded a mention by the Argentine National Fund of the Arts in 1994. In the Biennium 1990-1991 she received the(Buenos Aires) Municipal Prize.

She was screenwriter for the film “La vida según Muriel” (“Life according to Muriel”) in 1997 together with Eduardo Milewicz; and of “ Río escondido” (Hidden River) in 1999 with Mercedes García Guevara and Paul Allen.

She wrote the theater play "Donde no crecen las rosas" (Where roses do not grow) whiche premiered in 1989 at the Centro Cultural San Martin, Buenos Aires. She won the 2007 Casa de las Américas novel award with her novel "A thousand and One" ”.

"A thousand and One" (an Argentine and contemporary recreation of the saga of Sherezade, Bocaccio’s Decameron and the Canterbury Tales) was chosen among the 115 works presented to the Casa de las Américas contest, and received the prize "for its fluid, clean, graceful prose, Its intelligent, complex and playful structure; and because it constitutes a challenge to the tendencies shown today by the great publishing consortiums. "”.

Her work has been analyzed by Karina Elizabeth Vazquez (Missouri Western State University) and has been referenced in the international Women Screenwriters’ guide.

She died on March 2, 2008, due to a terminal illness, in the city of Buenos Aires.
